= List of elections, 1701–1800 =

The following elections occurred in the 18th century, between the years 1701 and 1800.

== 1700s ==
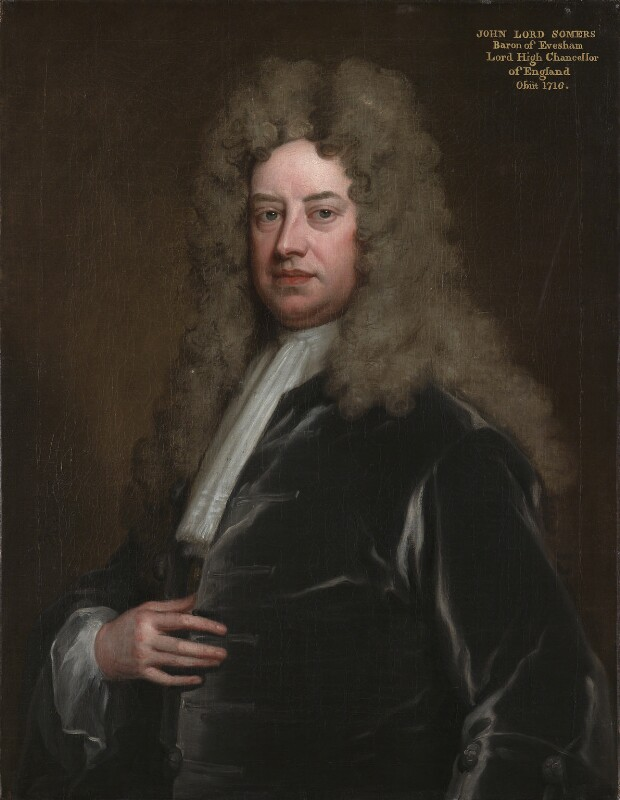
John Somers, 1st Baron Somers, leader of the Whig party which won the 1708 British general election

- January 1701 English general election
- November 1701 English general election
- 1702 English general election
- 1702 Scottish general election
- 1705 English general election
- 1707 British general election
- 1708 British general election

== 1710s ==
- 1710 British general election
- 1711 imperial election
- 1713 British general election
- 1713 Irish general election
- 1715 British general election

== 1720s ==
- 1721 conclave
- 1722 British general election
- 1724 conclave
- 1727 British general election

== 1730s ==
- 1730 conclave
- 1733 Polish–Lithuanian royal election
- 1734 British general election
- 1735 British Virgin Islands Assembly elections

== 1740s ==
- 1740 conclave
- 1741 British general election
- 1742 imperial election
- 1745 imperial election
- 1747 British general election

== 1750s ==
- 1754 British general election
- 1754 Oxfordshire election
- 1758 conclave

== 1760s ==
- 1761 British general election
- 1761 Irish general election
- 1764 imperial election
- 1764 Polish–Lithuanian royal election
- 1768 British general election
- 1769 conclave

== 1770s ==
- 1773 British Virgin Islands general election
- 1774 British general election
- 1774–1775 conclave
- 1776 Connecticut gubernatorial election
- 1776 New Jersey gubernatorial election
- 1776 Rhode Island gubernatorial election
- 1776 South Carolina gubernatorial election
- 1776 Virginia gubernatorial election
- 1777 Connecticut gubernatorial election
- 1777 Delaware gubernatorial election
- 1777 Maryland gubernatorial election
- 1777 New Jersey gubernatorial election
- 1777 New York gubernatorial election
- 1777 North Carolina gubernatorial election
- 1777 Rhode Island gubernatorial election
- 1777 Virginia gubernatorial election
- 1778 Connecticut gubernatorial election
- 1778 Delaware gubernatorial election
- 1778 Maryland gubernatorial election
- 1778 New Jersey gubernatorial election
- 1778 North Carolina gubernatorial election
- 1778 Rhode Island gubernatorial election
- 1778 South Carolina gubernatorial election
- 1778 Vermont Republic gubernatorial election
- 1778 Virginia gubernatorial election
- 1779 Connecticut gubernatorial election
- 1779 Maryland gubernatorial election
- 1779 New Jersey gubernatorial election
- 1779 North Carolina gubernatorial election
- 1779 Rhode Island gubernatorial election
- 1779 South Carolina gubernatorial election
- 1779 Vermont Republic gubernatorial election
- 1779 Virginia gubernatorial election

== 1780s ==
Great Britain by-elections

=== 1780 ===
- 1780 Connecticut gubernatorial election
- 1780 Maryland gubernatorial election
- 1780 Massachusetts gubernatorial election
- 1780 New Jersey gubernatorial election
- 1780 New York gubernatorial election
- 1780 North Carolina gubernatorial election
- 1780 Rhode Island gubernatorial election
- 1780 Virginia gubernatorial election
- 1780 British general election
- 1780 Vermont Republic gubernatorial election

=== 1781 ===
- 1781 Connecticut gubernatorial election
- 1781 Delaware gubernatorial election
- 1781 Maryland gubernatorial election
- 1781 Massachusetts gubernatorial election
- 1781 New Jersey gubernatorial election
- 1781 North Carolina gubernatorial election
- 1781 Rhode Island gubernatorial election
- 1781 Vermont Republic gubernatorial election
- 1781 Virginia gubernatorial election
- 1781 Virginia gubernatorial special election

=== 1782 ===
- 1782 Connecticut gubernatorial election
- 1782 Maryland gubernatorial election
- 1782 New Jersey gubernatorial election
- 1782 North Carolina gubernatorial election
- 1782 Rhode Island gubernatorial election
- 1782 South Carolina gubernatorial election
- 1782 Vermont Republic gubernatorial election
- 1782 Virginia gubernatorial election

=== 1783 ===
- 1783 Irish general election
- 1783 Connecticut gubernatorial election
- 1783 Delaware gubernatorial election
- 1783 Maryland gubernatorial election
- 1783 Massachusetts gubernatorial election
- 1783 New Jersey gubernatorial election
- 1783 New York gubernatorial election
- 1783 North Carolina gubernatorial election
- 1783 Rhode Island gubernatorial election
- 1783 South Carolina gubernatorial election
- 1783 Vermont Republic gubernatorial election
- 1783 Virginia gubernatorial election

=== 1784 ===
- 1784 British general election
- 1784 Connecticut gubernatorial election
- 1784 Maryland gubernatorial election
- 1784 Massachusetts gubernatorial election
- 1784 New Hampshire gubernatorial election
- 1784 New Jersey gubernatorial election
- 1784 North Carolina gubernatorial election
- 1784 Rhode Island gubernatorial election
- 1784 Vermont Republic gubernatorial election
- 1784 Virginia gubernatorial election

=== 1785 ===
- 1785 Connecticut gubernatorial election
- 1785 Maryland gubernatorial election
- 1785 Massachusetts gubernatorial election
- 1785 New Hampshire gubernatorial election
- 1785 New Jersey gubernatorial election
- 1785 North Carolina gubernatorial election
- 1785 Rhode Island gubernatorial election
- 1785 South Carolina gubernatorial election
- 1785 Virginia gubernatorial election

=== 1786 ===
- 1786 Connecticut gubernatorial election
- 1786 Delaware gubernatorial election
- 1786 Maryland gubernatorial election
- 1786 Massachusetts gubernatorial election
- 1786 New Hampshire gubernatorial election
- 1786 New Jersey gubernatorial election
- 1786 New York gubernatorial election
- 1786 North Carolina gubernatorial election
- 1786 Rhode Island gubernatorial election
- 1786 Virginia gubernatorial election
- 1786 Polish-Lithuanian legislative election

=== 1787 ===
- 1787 Massachusetts Senate election
- 1787 Connecticut gubernatorial election
- 1787 Maryland gubernatorial election
- 1787 Massachusetts gubernatorial election
- 1787 New Hampshire gubernatorial election
- 1787 New Jersey gubernatorial election
- 1787 North Carolina gubernatorial election
- 1787 Rhode Island gubernatorial election
- 1787 South Carolina gubernatorial election
- 1787 Virginia gubernatorial election

=== 1788 ===
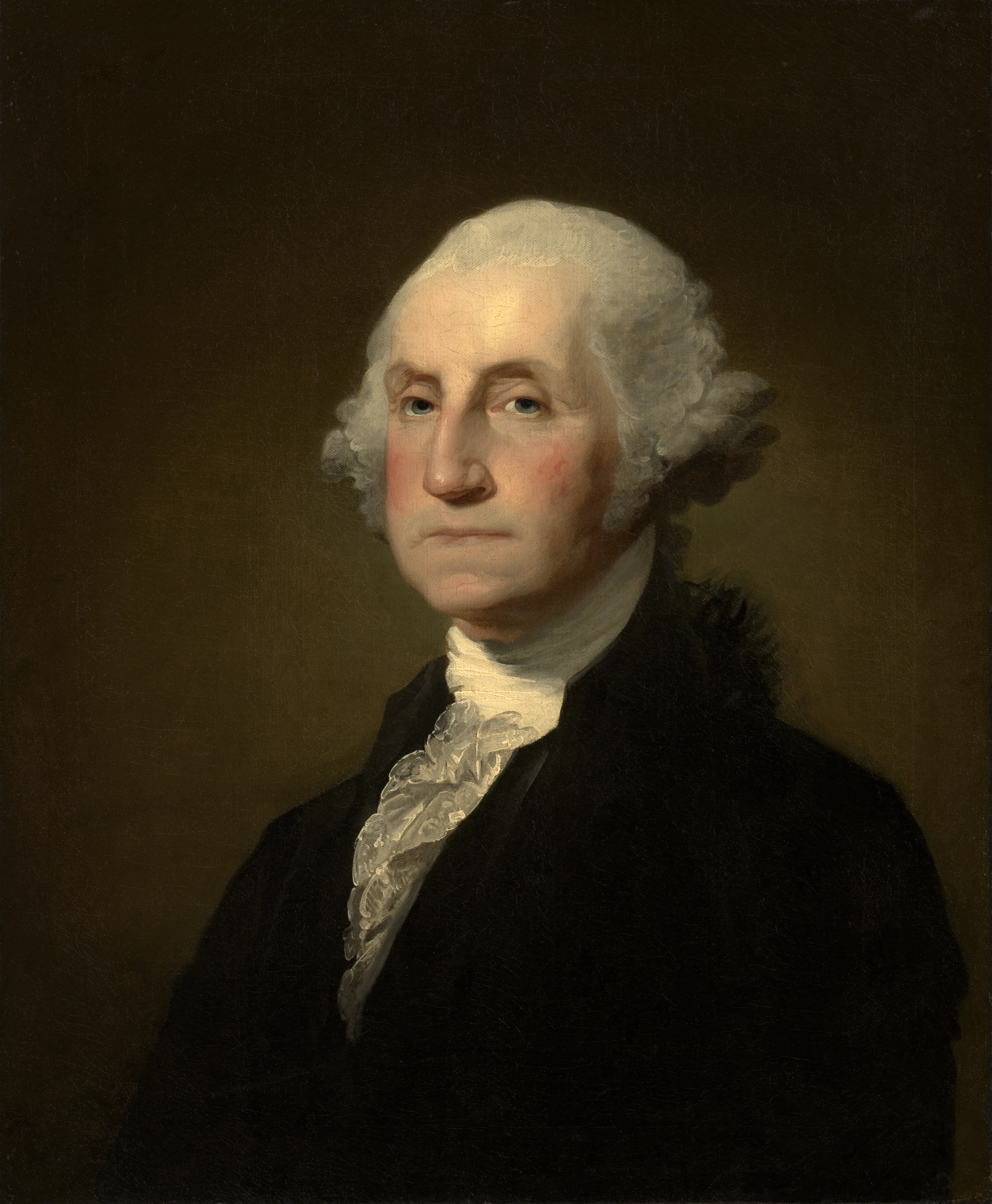
George Washington, winner of the 1788–89 United States presidential election

- 1788 Massachusetts Senate election
- 1788 Connecticut gubernatorial election
- 1788 Maryland gubernatorial election
- 1788 Massachusetts gubernatorial election
- 1788 New Hampshire gubernatorial election
- 1788 New Jersey gubernatorial election
- 1788 North Carolina gubernatorial election
- 1788 Rhode Island gubernatorial election
- 1788 Virginia gubernatorial election
- 1788 Polish-Lithuanian legislative election
- 1788–89 United States Senate elections
  - 1788 United States Senate elections in Pennsylvania
- 1788–89 United States House of Representatives elections
  - 1788 United States House of Representatives election in Connecticut
  - 1788 United States House of Representatives elections in South Carolina
  - 1788 United States House of Representatives election in Pennsylvania
  - 1788–1789 United States House of Representatives election in New Hampshire
  - 1789 United States House of Representatives elections in Maryland
  - 1788–1789 United States House of Representatives elections in Massachusetts
- 1788–89 United States presidential election

=== 1789 ===
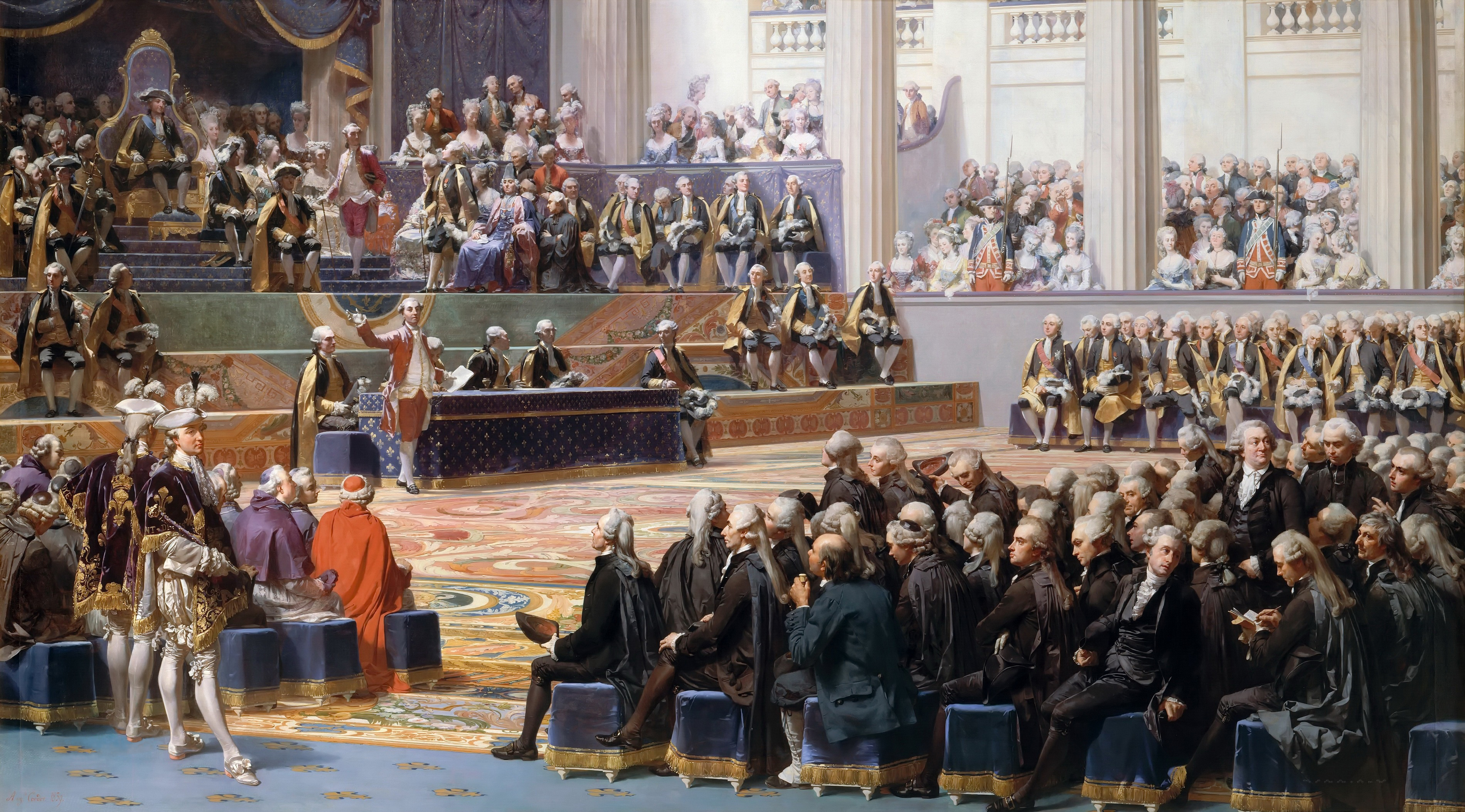
Opening session of the assembly of the Estates General, May 5, 1789

- Estates General of 1789
- 1788–89 United States presidential election
  - 1788–89 United States presidential election in Connecticut
  - 1788–89 United States presidential election in Delaware
  - 1788–89 United States presidential election in Georgia
  - 1788–89 United States presidential election in Maryland
  - 1788–89 United States presidential election in Massachusetts
  - 1788–89 United States presidential election in New Hampshire
  - 1788–89 United States presidential election in New Jersey
  - 1788–89 United States presidential election in Pennsylvania
  - 1788–89 United States presidential election in South Carolina
  - 1788–89 United States presidential election in Virginia
- 1788–89 United States House of Representatives elections
  - 1789 United States House of Representatives election in Delaware
  - 1789 United States House of Representatives elections in Georgia
  - 1789 United States House of Representatives election in New Jersey
  - 1789 United States House of Representatives elections in Virginia
    - 1789 Virginia's 5th congressional district election
  - 1789 United States House of Representatives elections in New York
  - 1789 New Hampshire's at-large congressional district special election
- 1789 Connecticut gubernatorial election
- 1789 Delaware gubernatorial election
- November 1789 Georgia gubernatorial election
- 1789 Maryland gubernatorial election
- 1789 Massachusetts gubernatorial election
- 1789 New Hampshire gubernatorial election
- 1789 New Jersey gubernatorial election
- 1789 New York gubernatorial election
- 1789 North Carolina gubernatorial special election
- 1789 North Carolina gubernatorial election
- 1789 South Carolina gubernatorial election
- 1789 Rhode Island gubernatorial election
- 1789 Virginia gubernatorial election
- 1788–89 United States Senate elections
  - 1789 United States Senate elections in New York
- 1789 Vermont Republic gubernatorial election

== 1790s ==
=== 1790 ===
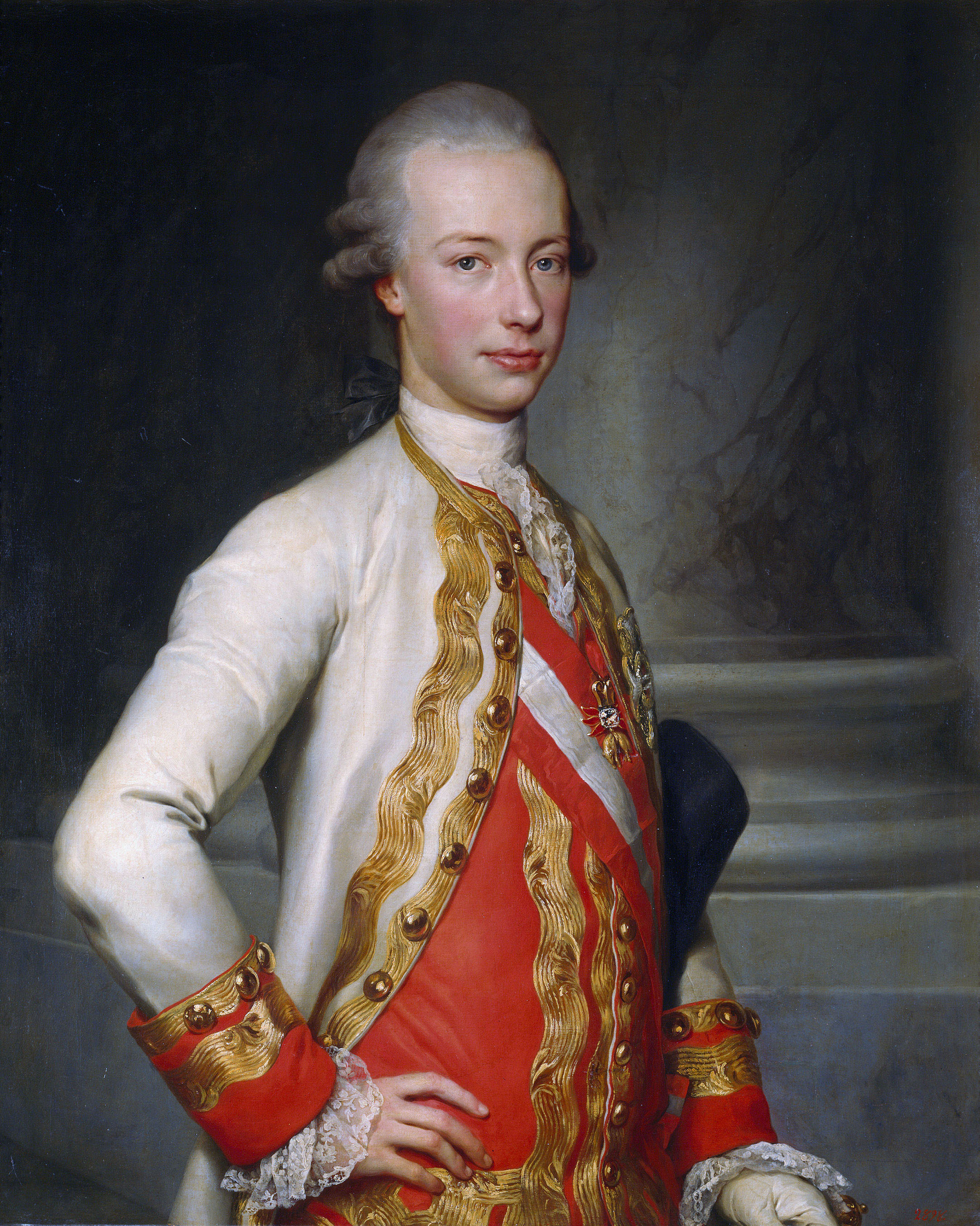
Leopold II, Holy Roman Emperor

- 1790–91 United States House of Representatives elections
  - 1790 United States House of Representatives elections in North Carolina
  - 1790 United States House of Representatives elections in New York
  - 1790 Virginia's 9th congressional district special election
  - 1790 United States House of Representatives election in New Hampshire
  - August 1790 United States House of Representatives election in Rhode Island
  - 1790 United States House of Representatives election in Connecticut
  - 1790–1792 United States House of Representatives elections in Massachusetts
  - 1790 United States House of Representatives elections in Maryland
  - 1790 United States House of Representatives elections in South Carolina
  - October 1790 United States House of Representatives election in Rhode Island
  - 1790 Connecticut's at-large congressional district special election
- 1790–91 United States Senate elections
  - 1790 United States Senate election in Delaware
- 1790 British general election
- 1790 imperial election
- 1790 Connecticut gubernatorial election
  - 1790 Connecticut lieutenant gubernatorial election
- 1790 Maryland gubernatorial election
- 1790 Massachusetts gubernatorial election
- 1790 New Hampshire gubernatorial election
- 1790 New Jersey gubernatorial election
- 1790 North Carolina gubernatorial election
- 1790 Pennsylvania gubernatorial election
- 1790 Rhode Island gubernatorial election
- 1790 Vermont Republic gubernatorial election
- 1790 Virginia gubernatorial election
- 1790 Polish-Lithuanian legislative election

=== 1791 ===
- 1790–91 United States Senate elections
  - 1791 United States Senate election in New York
- 1790–91 United States House of Representatives elections
  - 1791 United States House of Representatives elections in Georgia
  - 1791 Maryland's 3rd congressional district special election
  - 1791 United States House of Representatives election in New Jersey
  - 1791 United States House of Representatives elections in North Carolina
  - 1791 New York's 1st congressional district special election
  - 1791 United States House of Representatives elections in Vermont
  - 1791 Connecticut's at-large congressional district special election
  - 1791 United States House of Representatives elections in Pennsylvania
- 1791 Connecticut gubernatorial election
  - 1791 Connecticut lieutenant gubernatorial election
- 1791 Maryland gubernatorial election
- 1791 Massachusetts gubernatorial election
- 1791 French legislative election
- 1791 New Hampshire gubernatorial election
- 1791 New Jersey gubernatorial election
- 1791 North Carolina gubernatorial election
- 1791 Rhode Island gubernatorial election
- 1791 South Carolina gubernatorial election
- 1791 Vermont gubernatorial election
- 1791 Georgia gubernatorial election
- 1791 Virginia gubernatorial election

=== 1792 ===
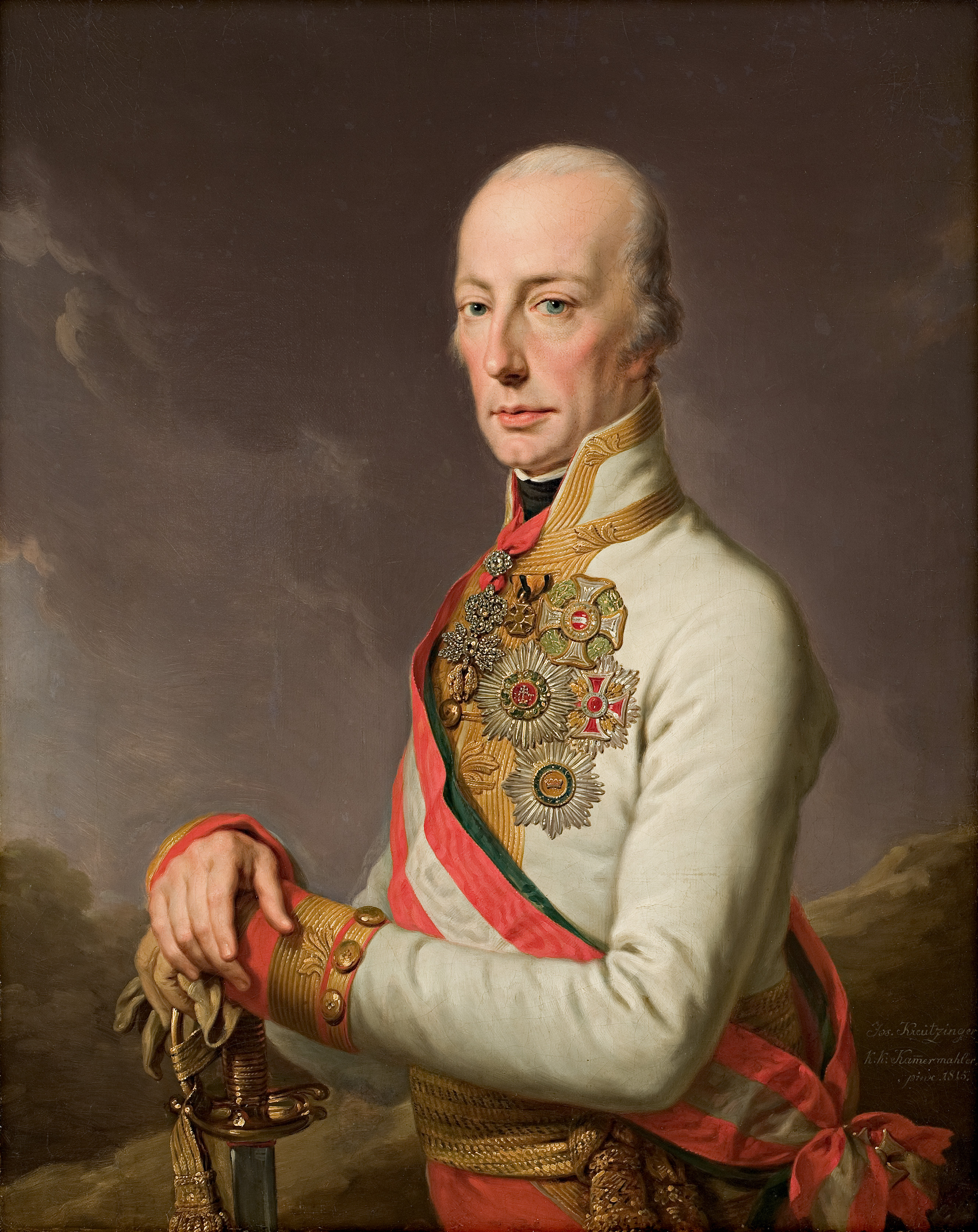
Francis II, last Holy Roman Emperor

- 1792 Connecticut gubernatorial election
  - 1792 Connecticut lieutenant gubernatorial election
- 1792 Delaware gubernatorial election
- 1792 Kentucky gubernatorial election
- 1792 Maryland gubernatorial election
- 1792 Massachusetts gubernatorial election
- 1792 New Hampshire gubernatorial election
- 1792 New Jersey gubernatorial election
- 1792 New York gubernatorial election
- 1792 North Carolina gubernatorial election
- 1792 Rhode Island gubernatorial election
- 1792 South Carolina gubernatorial election
- 1792 Vermont gubernatorial election
- 1792 Virginia gubernatorial election
- 1792 imperial election
- 1792–93 United States House of Representatives elections
- 1792–93 United States Senate elections
- 1792 French National Convention election
- 1792 United States presidential election

=== 1793 ===
- 1793 Connecticut gubernatorial election
  - 1793 Connecticut lieutenant gubernatorial election
- 1793 Maryland gubernatorial election
- 1793 Massachusetts gubernatorial election
- 1793 New Hampshire gubernatorial election
- 1793 New Jersey gubernatorial election
- 1793 North Carolina gubernatorial election
- 1793 Pennsylvania gubernatorial election
- 1793 Rhode Island gubernatorial election
- 1793 Vermont gubernatorial election
- 1793 Virginia gubernatorial election
- 1793 United States House of Representatives elections in New York
- 1793 Rauracian Republic annexation referendum
- 1793 French constitutional referendum
- 1793 Polish-Lithuanian legislative election

=== 1794 ===
- 1794 Connecticut gubernatorial election
  - 1794 Connecticut lieutenant gubernatorial election
- 1794 Maryland gubernatorial election
- 1794 New Hampshire gubernatorial election
- 1794 New Jersey gubernatorial election
- 1794 North Carolina gubernatorial election
- 1794 Rhode Island gubernatorial election
- 1794 South Carolina gubernatorial election
- 1794 Vermont gubernatorial election
- 1794 Virginia gubernatorial election
- 1794–95 United States Senate elections
- 1794–95 United States House of Representatives elections
- 1794 United States House of Representatives elections in New York

=== 1795 ===
- 1795 United States Senate election in New York
- 1795 Connecticut gubernatorial election
  - 1795 Connecticut lieutenant gubernatorial election
- 1795 Delaware gubernatorial election
- 1795 Georgia gubernatorial election
- 1795 Maryland gubernatorial election
- 1795 New Hampshire gubernatorial election
- 1795 New Jersey gubernatorial election
- 1795 New York gubernatorial election
- 1795 North Carolina gubernatorial election
- 1795 Rhode Island gubernatorial election
- 1795 Vermont gubernatorial election
- 1795 Virginia gubernatorial election
- 1795 French referendums
- 1795 French legislative election

=== 1796 ===
- 1796 Connecticut gubernatorial election
  - 1796 Connecticut lieutenant gubernatorial election
- 1796 Kentucky gubernatorial election
- 1796 Maryland gubernatorial election
- 1796 Massachusetts gubernatorial election
- 1796 New Hampshire gubernatorial election
- 1796 New Jersey gubernatorial election
- 1796 North Carolina gubernatorial election
- 1796 Pennsylvania gubernatorial election
- 1796 Rhode Island gubernatorial election
- 1796 South Carolina gubernatorial election
- 1796 Tennessee gubernatorial election
- 1796 Vermont gubernatorial election
- 1796 Virginia gubernatorial election
- 1796–97 United States Senate elections
  - 1796 United States Senate special election in New York
- 1796 British general election
- 1796–97 United States House of Representatives elections
  - 1796 United States House of Representatives elections in New York
- 1796 United States presidential election

=== 1797 ===
- 1796–97 United States Senate elections
  - 1797 United States Senate election in New York
- 1797 Connecticut gubernatorial election
- 1797 Georgia gubernatorial election
- 1797 Maryland gubernatorial election
- 1797 Massachusetts gubernatorial election
- 1797 New Hampshire gubernatorial election
- 1797 New Jersey gubernatorial election
- 1797 North Carolina gubernatorial election
- 1797 Rhode Island gubernatorial election
- 1797 Tennessee gubernatorial election
- 1797 Vermont gubernatorial election
- 1797 Virginia gubernatorial election
- 1797 Batavian Republic constitutional referendum
- 1797 Irish general election

=== 1798 ===
- 1798–99 United States Senate elections
  - January 1798 United States Senate special election in New York
  - August 1798 United States Senate special election in New York
- 1798 Helvetic Republic constitutional referendum
- 1798 French legislative election
- 1798 Connecticut gubernatorial election
  - 1798 Connecticut lieutenant gubernatorial election
- 1798 Delaware gubernatorial election
- 1798 Maryland gubernatorial election
- 1798 New Hampshire gubernatorial election
- 1798 New Jersey gubernatorial election
- 1798 New York gubernatorial election
- 1798 North Carolina gubernatorial election
- 1798 Rhode Island gubernatorial election
- 1798 South Carolina gubernatorial election
- 1798 Vermont gubernatorial election
- 1798 Virginia gubernatorial election
- 1798 Batavian Republic constitutional referendum
- 1798–99 United States House of Representatives elections
  - 1798 United States House of Representatives elections in New York
  - 1798–1799 United States House of Representatives elections in Massachusetts

=== 1799 ===
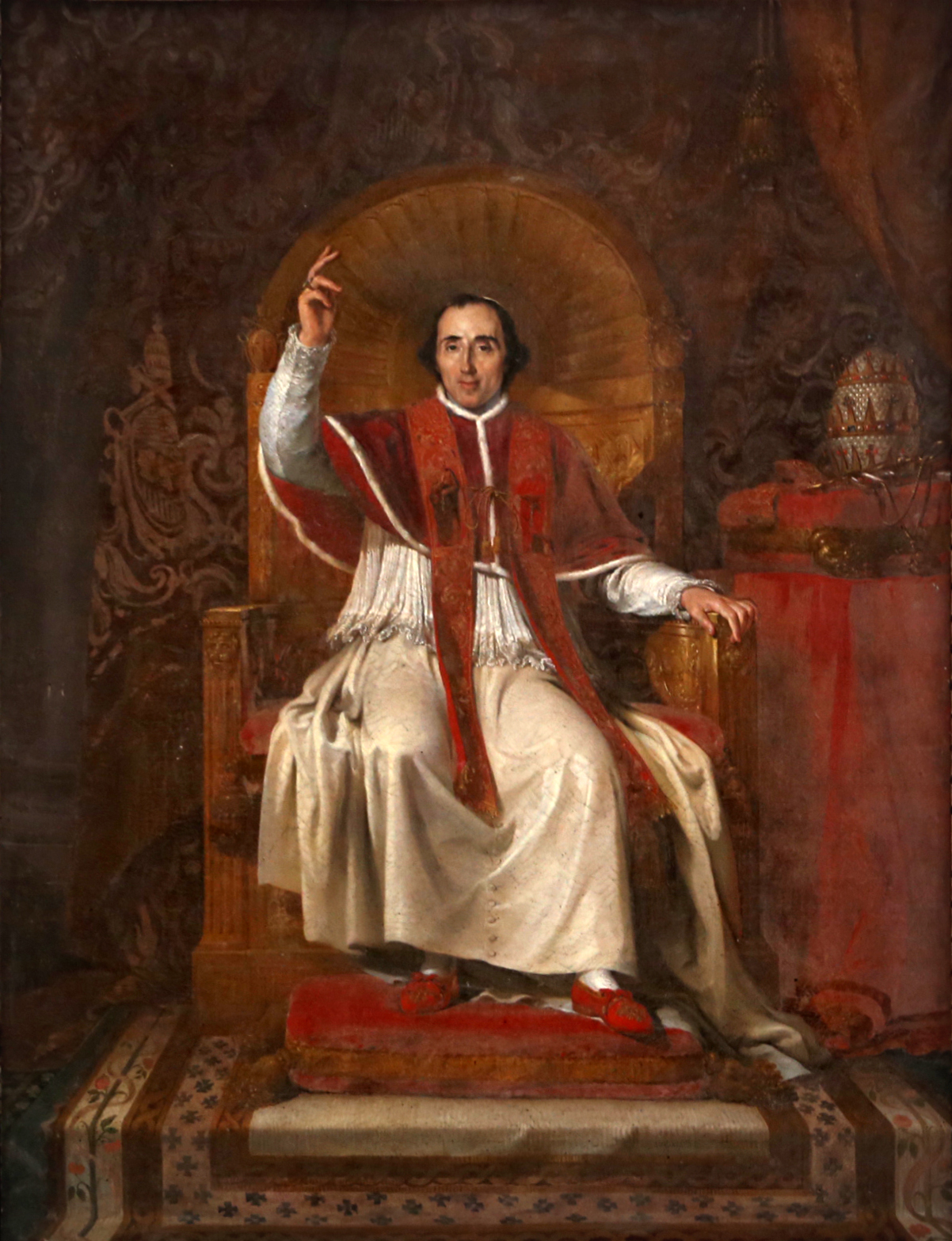
Pope Pius VII

- 1799 French legislative election
- 1798–99 United States House of Representatives elections
  - 1799 United States House of Representatives elections in Virginia
  - 1799 New Hampshire's at-large congressional district special election
  - 1799 New York's 1st congressional district special election
- 1799 Connecticut gubernatorial election
  - 1799 Connecticut lieutenant gubernatorial election
- 1799 Georgia gubernatorial election
- 1799 Maryland gubernatorial election
- 1799 New Jersey gubernatorial election
- 1799 New Hampshire gubernatorial election
- 1799 North Carolina gubernatorial election
- 1799 Pennsylvania gubernatorial election
- 1799 Tennessee gubernatorial election
- 1799 Vermont gubernatorial election
- 1799 Virginia gubernatorial election
- 1799–1800 conclave

== 1800 ==
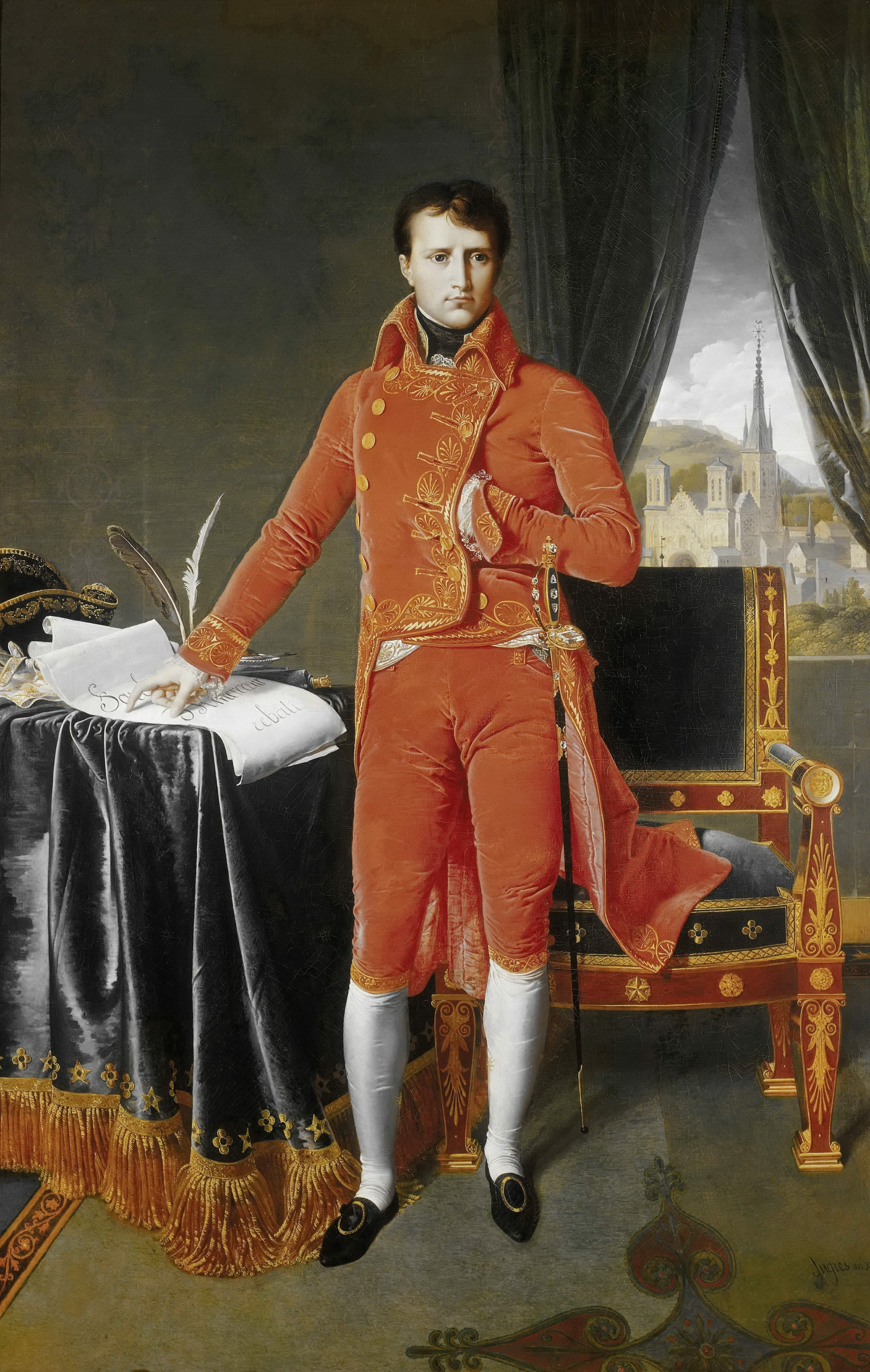
Bonaparte, First Consul

- 1800 French constitutional referendum
- 1800 Connecticut gubernatorial election
  - 1800 Connecticut lieutenant gubernatorial election
- 1800 Kentucky gubernatorial election
- 1800 Maryland gubernatorial election
- 1800 Massachusetts gubernatorial election
- 1800 New Hampshire gubernatorial election
- 1800 New Jersey gubernatorial election
- 1800 North Carolina gubernatorial election
- 1800 Rhode Island gubernatorial election
- 1800 South Carolina gubernatorial election
- 1800 United States gubernatorial elections
- 1800 Vermont gubernatorial election
- 1800 Virginia gubernatorial election
- 1800–01 United States Senate elections
  - April 1800 United States Senate special election in New York
  - November 1800 United States Senate special election in New York
- 1800–01 United States House of Representatives elections
  - 1800 United States House of Representatives elections in New York
- 1800 United States presidential election
