= 1783 Massachusetts gubernatorial election =

- April 7, 1783
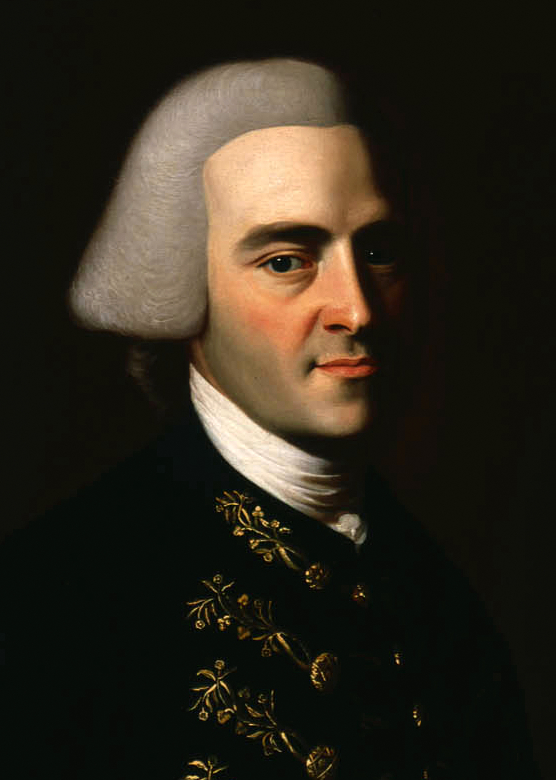
Nominee	John Hancock
Party	Nonpartisan
Popular vote	6,693
Percentage	73.49%
Governor before election
John Hancock
Nonpartisan
Elected Governor
John Hancock
Nonpartisan

A gubernatorial election was held in Massachusetts on April 7, 1783. John Hancock, the incumbent governor, was re-elected, with only token opposition.

== Results ==
Massachusetts gubernatorial election, 1783
Party	Candidate	Votes	%	±%
Nonpartisan	John Hancock (incumbent)	6,693	73.49%	−10.34
Write-in	Scattering	2,415	26.51%	+26.51
Total votes		9,108	100.00%	
Nonpartisan hold				
