= 1792 Connecticut gubernatorial election =

- December 1, 1792
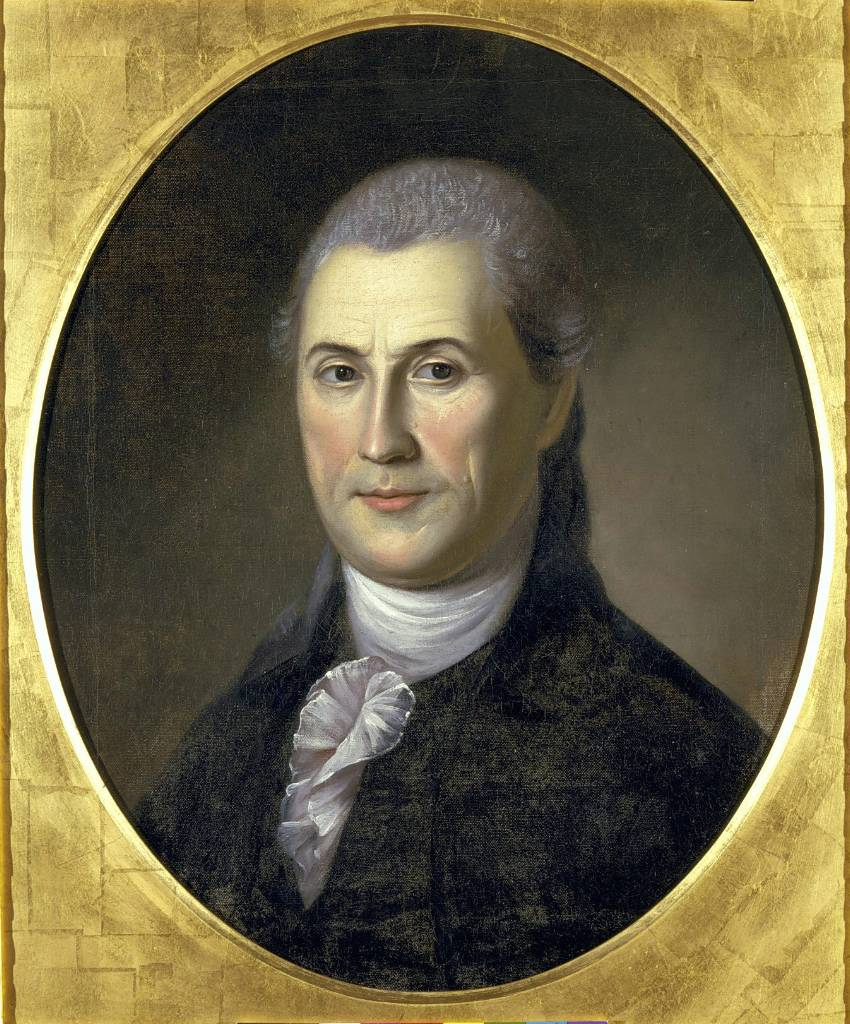
Nominee	Samuel Huntington
Party	Federalist
Popular vote	4,924
Percentage	100.00%
Governor before election
Samuel Huntington
Federalist
Elected Governor
Samuel Huntington
Federalist

The 1792 Connecticut gubernatorial election was held on December 1, 1792, in order to elect the Governor of Connecticut. Incumbent Federalist Governor of Connecticut Samuel Huntington won re-election as he ran unopposed.

== General election ==
On election day, December 1, 1792, Federalist nominee Samuel Huntington easily won re-election as he ran unopposed. Huntington was sworn in for his seventh term on December 2, 1792.

=== Results ===
Connecticut gubernatorial election, 1792
Party	Candidate	Votes	%
Federalist	Samuel Huntington (incumbent)	4,924	100.00
Total votes		4,924	100.00
Federalist hold			
