= 1800 Connecticut lieutenant gubernatorial election =

- April 7, 1800
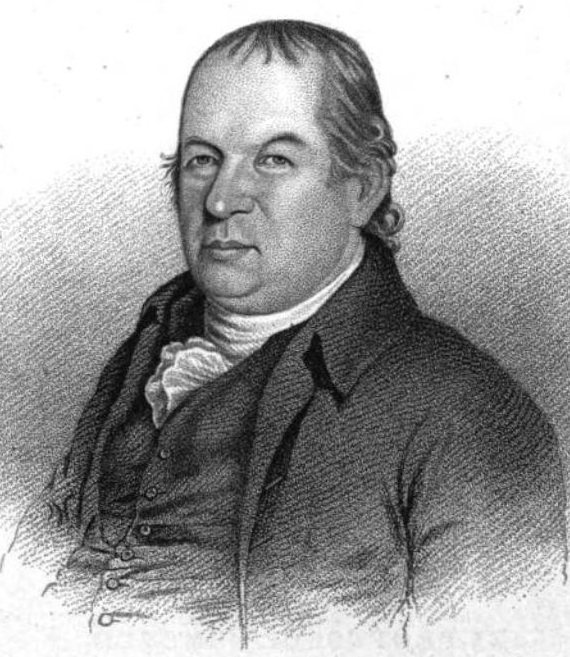
Nominee	John Treadwell
Party	Federalist
Popular vote	-
Percentage	100.00%
Lieutenant Governor before election
John Treadwell
Federalist
Elected Lieutenant Governor
John Treadwell
Federalist

The 1800 Connecticut lieutenant gubernatorial election was held on April 7, 1800, in order to elect the lieutenant governor of Connecticut. Incumbent Federalist lieutenant governor John Treadwell was re-elected unopposed by the Connecticut legislature.

== General election ==
On election day, April 7, 1800, incumbent Federalist lieutenant governor John Treadwell was re-elected unopposed by the Connecticut legislature. Treadwell was sworn in for his third term on May 8, 1800.

=== Results ===
Connecticut lieutenant gubernatorial election, 1800
Party	Candidate	Votes	%
Federalist	John Treadwell (incumbent)	-	100.00
Total votes		-	100.00
Federalist hold			
