= 1784 Virginia gubernatorial election =

- November 17, 1784
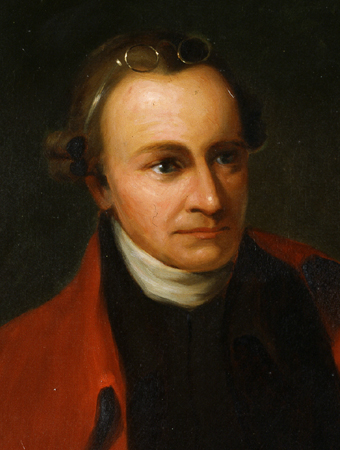
Nominee	Patrick Henry
Governor before election
Benjamin Harrison V
Elected Governor
Patrick Henry

A gubernatorial election was held in Virginia on November 17, 1784. The delegate from Henry County Patrick Henry, who had served as the 1st governor of Virginia from 1776 to 1779, was elected to a fourth non-consecutive term.

The incumbent governor Benjamin Harrison V was ineligible for re-election due to term limits established by the Constitution of Virginia. The election was conducted by the Virginia General Assembly in joint session. Henry was selected by a majority of members on the first ballot; the official record of the proceedings does not include the names or tallied votes for any other candidates.

== General election ==
1784 Virginia gubernatorial election
Candidate	First ballot	
Candidate	Count	Percent
Patrick Henry	**	
Total	**	100.00

== Bibliography ==
- State of Virginia (1828). Journal of the House of Delegates [...]. Richmond.
