= 1785 Connecticut gubernatorial election =

- April 14, 1785
| Nominee | Matthew Griswold |
| Party | Nonpartisan |
| Popular vote | 1 |
| Percentage | 100.00% |
Governor before election
Matthew Griswold
Nonpartisan
Elected Governor
Matthew Griswold
Nonpartisan

The 1785 Connecticut gubernatorial election was held on April 14, 1785, in order to elect the Governor of Connecticut. Incumbent Nonpartisan Governor Matthew Griswold won re-election as he ran unopposed. The exact number of votes cast in this election is unknown.

== General election ==
On election day, April 14, 1785, incumbent Nonpartisan Governor Matthew Griswold easily won re-election as he ran unopposed. Griswold was sworn in for his second term on May 10, 1785.

=== Results ===
Connecticut gubernatorial election, 1785
| Party | Candidate | Votes | % |
|---|---|---|---|
| Nonpartisan | Matthew Griswold (incumbent) | 1 | 100.00 |
| Total votes | | 1 | 100.00 |
| Nonpartisan hold | | | |
