= 1790 Virginia gubernatorial election =

- November 26, 1790
Nominee	Beverley Randolph
Governor before election
Beverley Randolph
Elected Governor
Beverley Randolph

A gubernatorial election was held in Virginia on November 26, 1790. The incumbent governor of Virginia Beverley Randolph was re-elected.

The election was conducted by the Virginia General Assembly in joint session. Randolph was selected by a majority of members on the first ballot; the official record of the proceedings does not include the names or tallied votes for any other candidates.

== General election ==
1789 Virginia gubernatorial election
Candidate	First ballot	
Candidate	Count	Percent
Beverley Randolph (incumbent)	**	
Total	**	100.00

== Bibliography ==
- Sobel, Robert; Raimo, John (1978). Biographical Directory of the Governors of the United States 1789–1978. Vol. 4. Westport, CT: Meckler Books.
- Virginia (1828). Journal of the House of Delegates [...]. Richmond.
