= 1796 Connecticut gubernatorial election =

- April 14, 1796
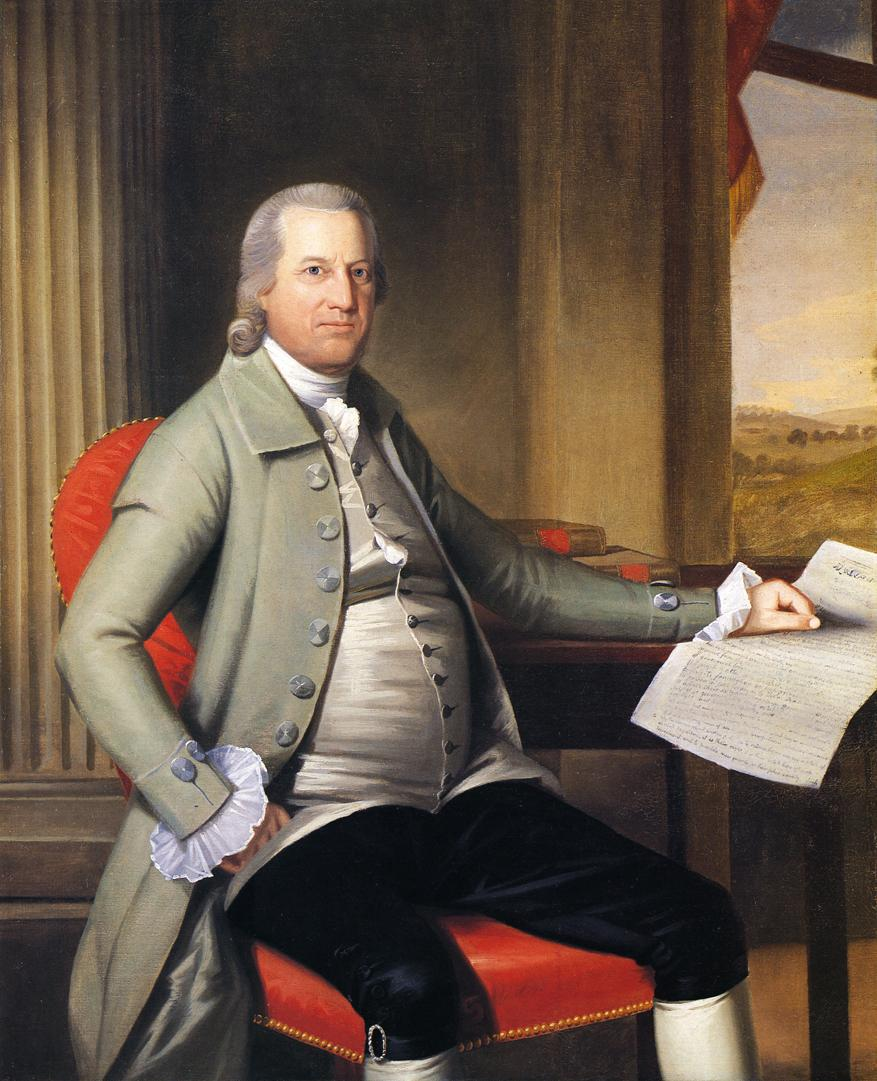
Nominee	Oliver Wolcott
Party	Federalist
Popular vote	3,805
Percentage	48.95%
Governor before election
Oliver Wolcott (Acting)
Federalist
Elected Governor
Oliver Wolcott
Federalist

The 1796 Connecticut gubernatorial election was held on April 14, 1796, in order to elect the Governor of Connecticut. Incumbent Federalist Acting Governor Oliver Wolcott won a plurality of the vote in his election bid against other candidates. However, as no candidate received a majority of the total votes cast as was required by Connecticut law, the election was forwarded to the Connecticut legislature, who chose Wolcott as governor.

== General election ==
On election day, April 14, 1796, incumbent Federalist Acting Governor Oliver Wolcott won the election after having been chosen by the Connecticut legislature. Wolcott was sworn in for his first full term on May 2, 1796.

=== Results ===
Connecticut gubernatorial election, 1796
Party	Candidate	Votes	%
Federalist	Oliver Wolcott (incumbent)	3,805	48.95
	Scattering	3,968	51.05
Total votes		7,773	100.00
Federalist hold			
