= 1798 Virginia gubernatorial election =

- December 7, 1798
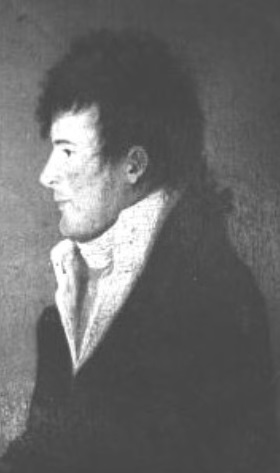
Nominee	James Wood
Governor before election
James Wood
Democratic-Republican
Elected Governor
James Wood
Democratic-Republican (Note: The Journal of the Senate does not list parties for this election. Sobel and Raimo list Wood as a Democratic-Republican during his tenure, while Kallenbach and Kallenbach list him as a Federalist.)

A gubernatorial election was held in Virginia on December 7, 1798. The incumbent governor of Virginia James Wood was re-elected.

The election was conducted by the Virginia General Assembly in joint session.

== General election ==
1798 Virginia gubernatorial election
Candidate	First ballot	
Candidate	Count	Percent
James Wood (incumbent)	**	
Total	**	100.00

== Bibliography ==
- Kallenbach, Joseph E.; Kallenbach, Jessamine S. (1977). American State Governors, 1776–1976. Vol. 1. Dobbs Ferry, NY: Oceana Publications.
- Miller, Cynthia A., ed. (1977). Journal of the Senate of Virginia: Session of 1798/99. Richmond: Virginia State Library.
- Sobel, Robert; Raimo, John (1978). Biographical Directory of the Governors of the United States 1789–1978. Vol. 4. Westport, CT: Meckler Books.
