= 1793 Massachusetts gubernatorial election =

- April 1, 1793
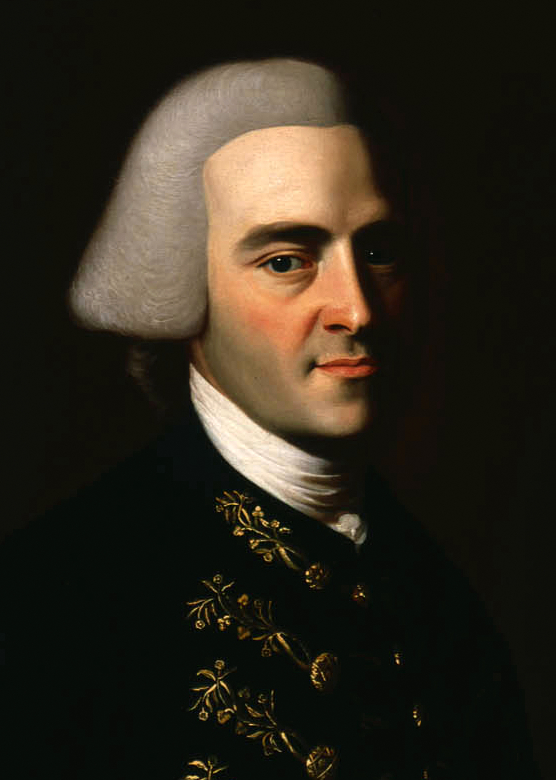
Nominee	John Hancock
Party	Nonpartisan
Popular vote	16,428
Percentage	89.94%
- County results Hancock: 60–70% 80–90% 90–100%
Governor before election
John Hancock
Nonpartisan
Elected Governor
John Hancock
Nonpartisan

The 1793 Massachusetts gubernatorial election was held on April 1, 1793, in order to elect the Governor of Massachusetts. Incumbent Governor John Hancock won re-election as he ran unopposed.

== General election ==
On election day, April 1, 1793, incumbent Governor John Hancock won re-election as he ran unopposed. Hancock was sworn in for his twelfth overall term on May 30, 1793.

=== Results ===
Massachusetts gubernatorial election, 1793
Party	Candidate	Votes	%
Nonpartisan	John Hancock (incumbent)	16,428	89.94%
	Scattering	1,838	10.06%
Total votes		18,266	100.00%
Nonpartisan hold			
