= 1790 Connecticut gubernatorial election =

- April 8, 1790
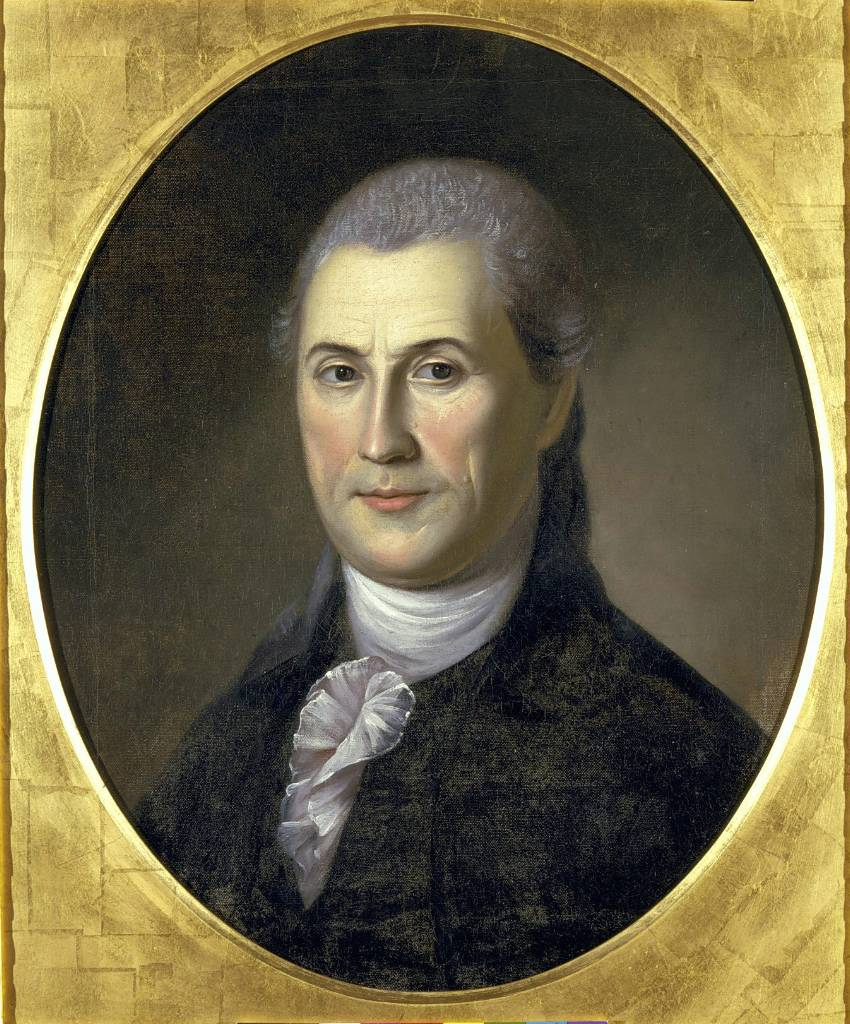
Nominee	Samuel Huntington
Party	Federalist
Popular vote	3,290
Percentage	100.00%
- Municipal results Huntington : 100%
Governor before election
Samuel Huntington
Federalist
Elected Governor
Samuel Huntington
Federalist

The 1790 Connecticut gubernatorial election was held on April 8, 1790, in order to elect the Governor of Connecticut. Incumbent Federalist Governor of Connecticut Samuel Huntington won re-election as he ran unopposed.

== General election ==
On election day, April 8, 1790, Federalist nominee Samuel Huntington easily won re-election as he ran unopposed. Huntington was sworn in for his fifth term on May 11, 1790.

=== Results ===
Connecticut gubernatorial election, 1790
Party	Candidate	Votes	%
Federalist	Samuel Huntington (incumbent)	3,290	100.00
Total votes		3,290	100.00
Federalist hold			
