= 1789 Rhode Island gubernatorial election =

- April 1, 1789
Nominee	John Collins
Percentage	100.00%
Governor before election
John Collins
Elected Governor
John Collins

The 1789 Rhode Island gubernatorial election was an uncontested election held on April 1, 1789, to elect the governor of Rhode Island. John Collins, the incumbent governor, was the sole candidate and so won with 100% of the vote.
