= 1785 Virginia gubernatorial election =

- November 25, 1785
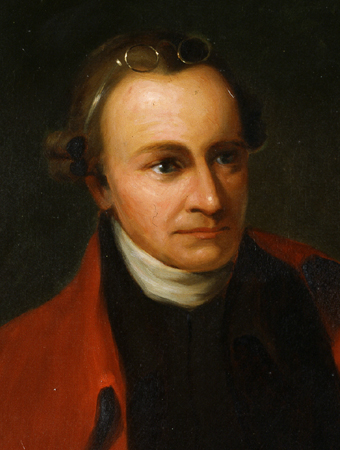
Nominee	Patrick Henry
Governor before election
Patrick Henry
Elected Governor
Patrick Henry

A gubernatorial election was held in Virginia on November 25, 1785. The incumbent governor of Virginia Patrick Henry was re-elected.

The election was conducted by the Virginia General Assembly in joint session. Henry was selected by a majority of members on the first ballot; the official record of the proceedings does not include the names or tallied votes for any other candidates.

== General election ==
1785 Virginia gubernatorial election
Candidate	First ballot	
Candidate	Count	Percent
Patrick Henry (incumbent)	**	
Total	**	100.00

== Bibliography ==
- State of Virginia (1828). Journal of the House of Delegates [...]. Richmond.
