= 1784 Massachusetts gubernatorial election =

- April 5, 1784
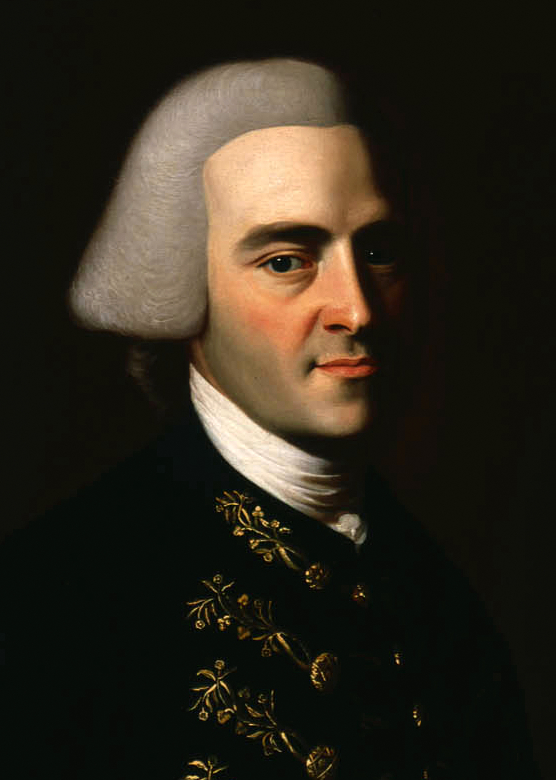
Nominee	John Hancock
Party	Nonpartisan
Popular vote	5,160
Percentage	67.62%
Governor before election
John Hancock
Nonpartisan
Elected Governor
John Hancock
Nonpartisan

A gubernatorial election was held in Massachusetts on April 5, 1784. John Hancock, the incumbent governor, was re-elected, with only token opposition.

== Results ==
Massachusetts gubernatorial election, 1784
Party	Candidate	Votes	%	±%
Nonpartisan	John Hancock (incumbent)	5,160	67.62%	−5.87
Write-in	Scattering	2,471	32.38%	+5.87
Total votes		7,631	100.00%	
Nonpartisan hold				
