= 1792 Massachusetts gubernatorial election =

- April 2, 1792
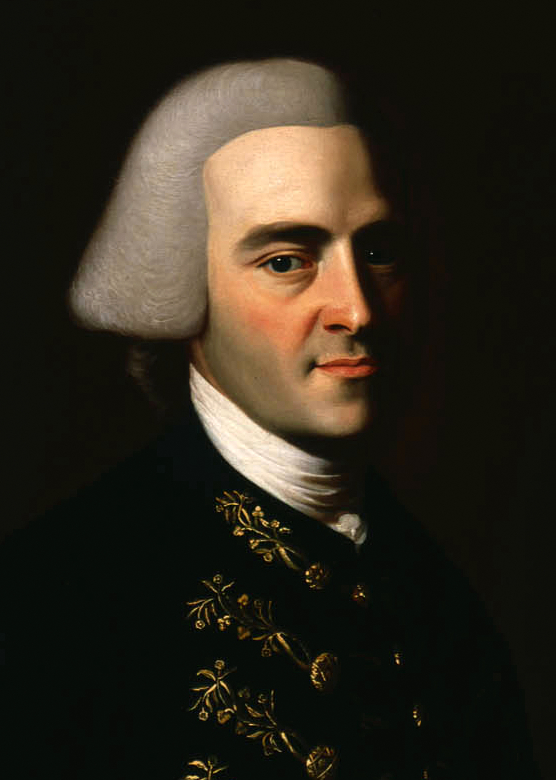
Nominee	John Hancock
Party	Nonpartisan
Popular vote	14,628
Percentage	86.59%
- County results Hancock: 50–60% 60–70% 80–90% 90–100%
Governor before election
John Hancock
Nonpartisan
Elected Governor
John Hancock
Nonpartisan

The 1792 Massachusetts gubernatorial election was held on April 2, 1792, in order to elect the Governor of Massachusetts. Incumbent Governor John Hancock won re-election as he ran unopposed.

== General election ==
On election day, April 2, 1792, incumbent Governor John Hancock won re-election as he ran unopposed. Hancock was sworn in for his eleventh overall term on May 30, 1792.

=== Results ===
Massachusetts gubernatorial election, 1792
Party	Candidate	Votes	%
Nonpartisan	John Hancock (incumbent)	14,628	86.59%
	Scattering	2,266	13.41%
Total votes		16,894	100.00%
Nonpartisan hold			
