= 1779 Connecticut gubernatorial election =

- April 8, 1779
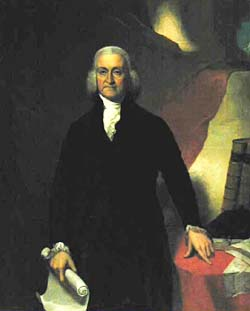
Nominee	Jonathan Trumbull
Party	Nonpartisan
Popular vote	2,108
Percentage	100.00%
Governor before election
Jonathan Trumbull
Nonpartisan
Elected Governor
Jonathan Trumbull
Nonpartisan

The 1779 Connecticut gubernatorial election was held on April 8, 1779, in order to elect the Governor of Connecticut. Incumbent Nonpartisan Governor Jonathan Trumbull won re-election as he ran unopposed.

== General election ==
On election day, April 8, 1779, incumbent Nonpartisan Governor Jonathan Trumbull easily won re-election as he ran unopposed. Trumbull was sworn in for his fourth term on May 10, 1779.

=== Results ===
Connecticut gubernatorial election, 1779
Party	Candidate	Votes	%
Nonpartisan	Jonathan Trumbull (incumbent)	2,108	100.00
Total votes		2,108	100.00
Nonpartisan hold			
