= 1788 Connecticut gubernatorial election =

- April 10, 1788
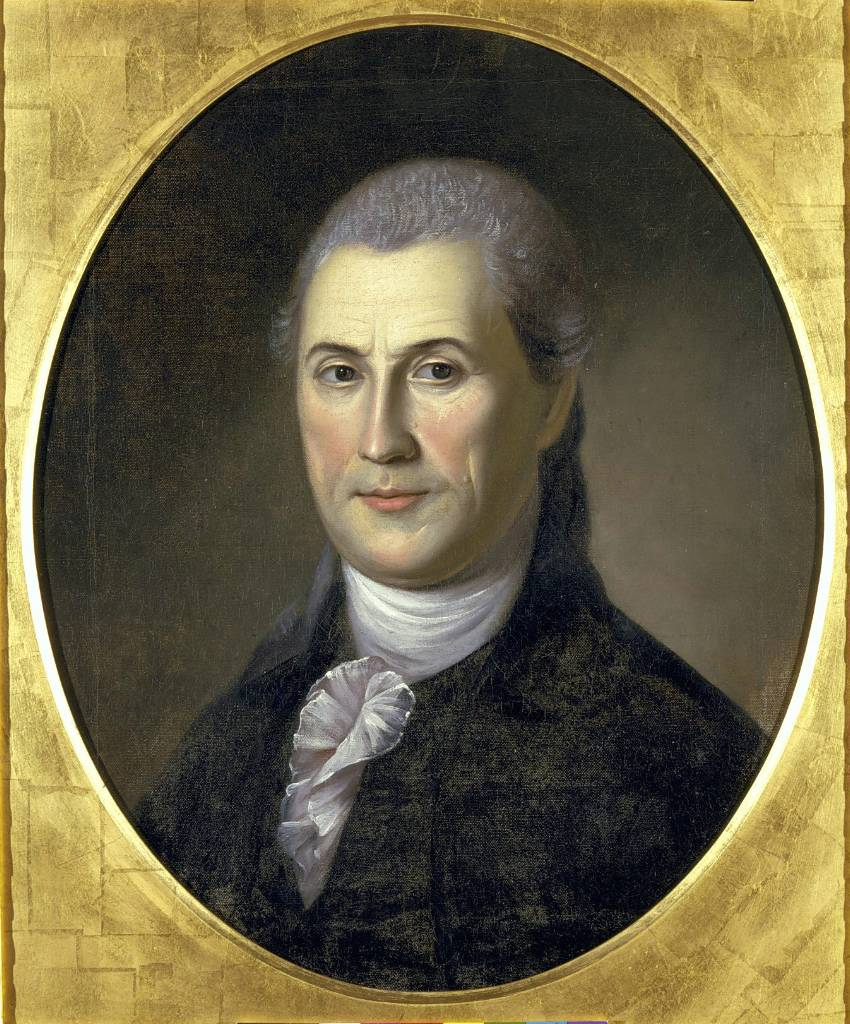
Nominee	Samuel Huntington
Party	Federalist
Popular vote	1
Percentage	100.00%
Governor before election
Samuel Huntington
Federalist
Elected Governor
Samuel Huntington
Federalist

The 1788 Connecticut gubernatorial election was held on April 10, 1788, in order to elect the Governor of Connecticut. Incumbent Federalist Governor of Connecticut Samuel Huntington won re-election as he ran unopposed.

== General election ==
On election day, April 10, 1788, Federalist nominee Samuel Huntington easily won re-election as he ran unopposed. Huntington was sworn in for his third term on May 11, 1788.

=== Results ===
Connecticut gubernatorial election, 1788
Party	Candidate	Votes	%
Federalist	Samuel Huntington (incumbent)	1	100.00
Total votes		1	100.00
Federalist hold			
