= 1776 New Jersey gubernatorial election =

- August 31, 1776
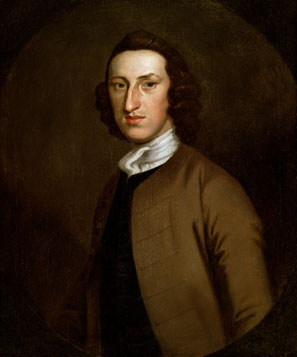

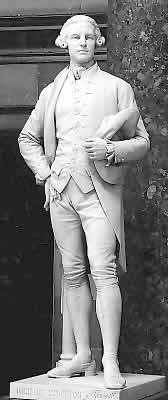
Nominee	William Livingston	Richard Stockton
Party	Nonpartisan	Nonpartisan
Popular vote	19	18
Percentage	51.35%	48.65%
Governor before election
William Franklin (as Royal Governor)
Nonpartisan
Elected Governor
William Livingston
Nonpartisan

The 1776 New Jersey gubernatorial election was held on August 31, 1776, in order to elect the first Governor of New Jersey. Candidate and former Member of the New York General Assembly William Livingston was elected by the New Jersey General Assembly against his opponent candidate Richard Stockton.

== General election ==
On election day, August 31, 1776, candidates William Livingston and Richard Stockton each received the same number of votes on the first ballot. On the second ballot, Livingston was elected by the New Jersey General Assembly by a margin of one vote. Livingston was sworn in as the first Governor of New Jersey that same day.

=== Results ===
New Jersey gubernatorial election, 1776
Party	Candidate	Votes	%
Nonpartisan	William Livingston	19	51.35%
Nonpartisan	Richard Stockton	18	48.65%
Total votes		37	100.00%
Nonpartisan hold			
