= 1791 Connecticut gubernatorial election =

- April 14, 1791
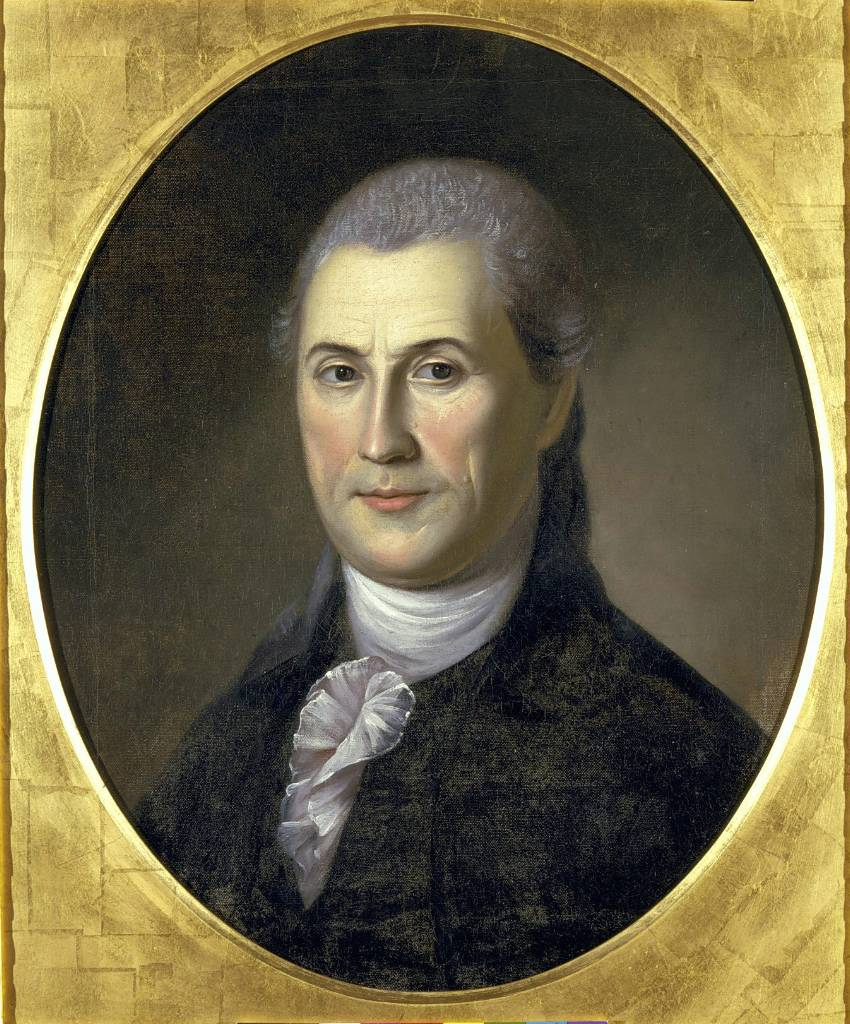
Nominee	Samuel Huntington
Party	Federalist
Popular vote	1
Percentage	100.00%
Governor before election
Samuel Huntington
Federalist
Elected Governor
Samuel Huntington
Federalist

The 1791 Connecticut gubernatorial election was held on April 14, 1791, in order to elect the Governor of Connecticut. Incumbent Federalist Governor of Connecticut Samuel Huntington won re-election as he ran unopposed.

== General election ==
On election day, April 14, 1791, Federalist nominee Samuel Huntington easily won re-election as he ran unopposed. Huntington was sworn in for his sixth term on May 10, 1791.

=== Results ===
Connecticut gubernatorial election, 1791
Party	Candidate	Votes	%
Federalist	Samuel Huntington (incumbent)	1	100.00
Total votes		1	100.00
Federalist hold			
