= 1797 Connecticut gubernatorial election =

- April 13, 1797
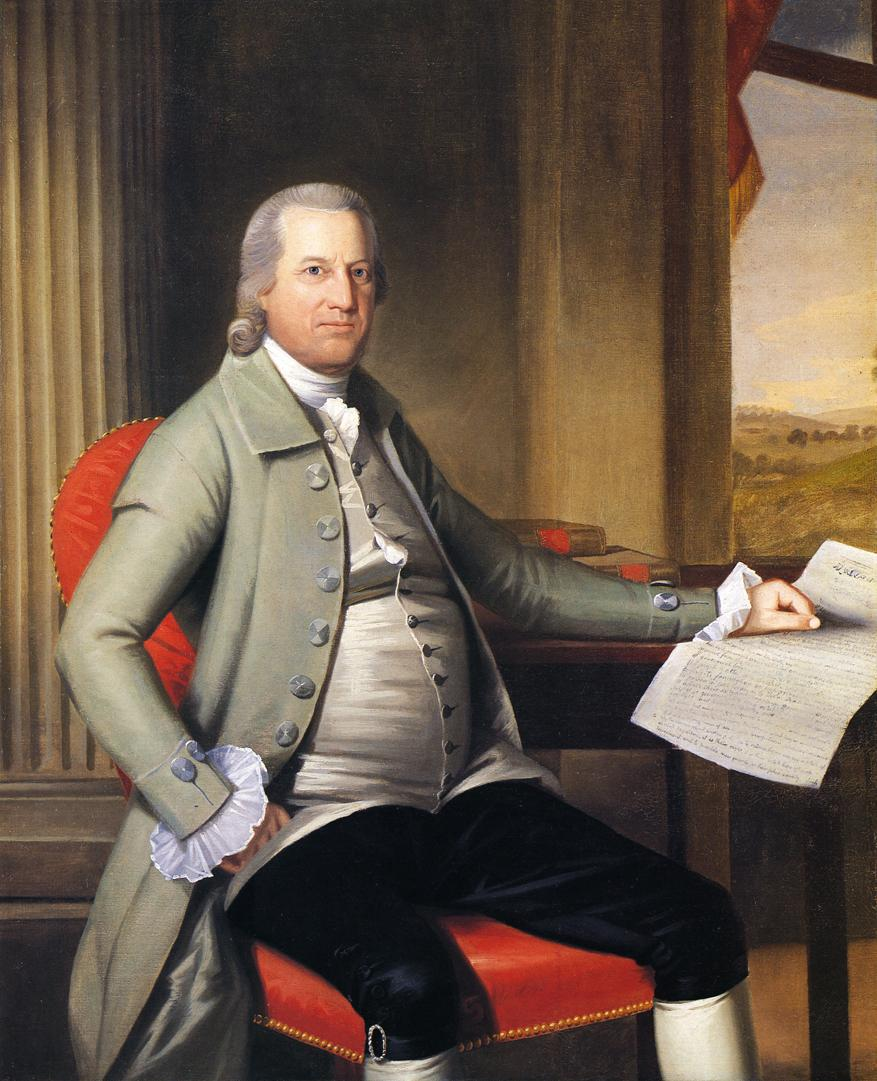
Nominee	Oliver Wolcott
Party	Federalist
Popular vote	1
Percentage	100.00%
Governor before election
Oliver Wolcott
Federalist
Elected Governor
Oliver Wolcott
Federalist

The 1797 Connecticut gubernatorial election was held on April 13, 1797, in order to elect the Governor of Connecticut. Incumbent Federalist Governor of Connecticut Oliver Wolcott won re-election as he ran unopposed.

== General election ==
On election day, April 13, 1797, Federalist nominee Oliver Wolcott easily won re-election as he ran unopposed. Wolcott was sworn in for his second term on May 2, 1797.

=== Results ===
Connecticut gubernatorial election, 1797
Party	Candidate	Votes	%
Federalist	Oliver Wolcott (incumbent)	1	100.00
Total votes		1	100.00
Federalist hold			
