= 1780 Connecticut gubernatorial election =

- April 13, 1780
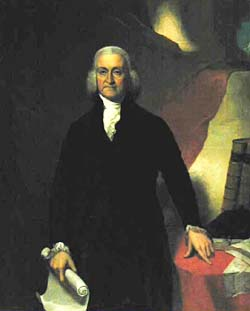
Nominee	Jonathan Trumbull
Party	Nonpartisan
Popular vote	3,598
Percentage	49.52%
Governor before election
Jonathan Trumbull
Nonpartisan
Elected Governor
Jonathan Trumbull
Nonpartisan

The 1780 Connecticut gubernatorial election was held on April 13, 1780, in order to elect the Governor of Connecticut. Incumbent Nonpartisan Governor Jonathan Trumbull won a plurality of the vote in his re-election bid against other candidates. However, as no candidate received a majority of the total votes cast as was required by Connecticut law, the election was forwarded to the Connecticut legislature, who chose Trumbull as governor.

== General election ==
On election day, April 13, 1780, incumbent Nonpartisan Governor Jonathan Trumbull won re-election after having been chosen by the Connecticut legislature. Trumbull was sworn in for his fifth term on May 10, 1780.

=== Results ===
Connecticut gubernatorial election, 1780
Party	Candidate	Votes	%
Nonpartisan	Jonathan Trumbull (incumbent)	3,598	49.52
	Scattering	3,668	50.48
Total votes		7,266	100.00
Nonpartisan hold			
