= 1795 Virginia gubernatorial election =

- November 26, 1795
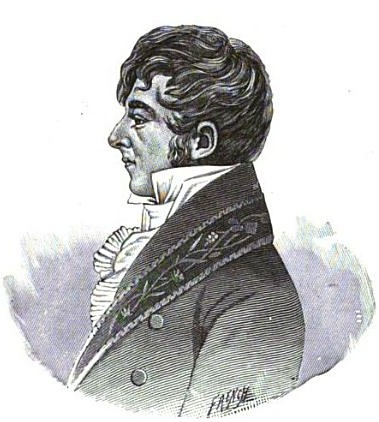
Nominee	Robert Brooke
Governor before election
Robert Brooke
Democratic-Republican
Elected Governor
Robert Brooke
Democratic-Republican (Note: The Journal of the Senate does not list parties for this election. Sobel and Raimo list Brooke as a Democratic-Republican during his tenure.)

A gubernatorial election was held in Virginia on November 26, 1795. The Democratic-Republican incumbent governor of Virginia Robert Brooke was re-elected.

The election was conducted by the Virginia General Assembly in joint session. Brooke was elected with a majority on the first ballot.

== General election ==
1795 Virginia gubernatorial election
Candidate	First ballot	
Candidate	Count	Percent
Robert Brooke (incumbent)	**	
Total	**	100.00

== Bibliography ==
- Headlee, Thomas J. Jr., ed. (1976). Journal of the Senate of Virginia: November Session, 1795. Richmond: Virginia State Library.
- Moore, Craig S. (2003). "A Guide to the Governor Robert Brooke Executive Papers, 1794–1796". Archival Resources of the Virginias. Library of Virginia.
- Sobel, Robert; Raimo, John (1978). Biographical Directory of the Governors of the United States 1789–1978. Vol. 4. Westport, CT: Meckler Books.
