= 1783 Connecticut gubernatorial election =

- April 10, 1783
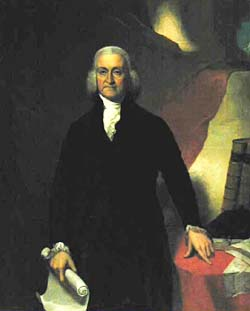
Nominee	Jonathan Trumbull
Party	Nonpartisan
Popular vote	2,209
Percentage	31.30%
Governor before election
Jonathan Trumbull
Nonpartisan
Elected Governor
Jonathan Trumbull
Nonpartisan

The 1783 Connecticut gubernatorial election was held on April 10, 1783, in order to elect the Governor of Connecticut. Incumbent Nonpartisan Governor Jonathan Trumbull won a plurality of the vote in his re-election bid against other candidates. However, as no candidate received a majority of the total votes cast as was required by Connecticut law, the election was forwarded to the Connecticut legislature, who chose Trumbull as governor.

== General election ==
On election day, April 10, 1783, incumbent Nonpartisan Governor Jonathan Trumbull won re-election after having been chosen by the Connecticut legislature. Trumbull was sworn in for his eighth term on May 10, 1783.

=== Results ===
Connecticut gubernatorial election, 1783
Party	Candidate	Votes	%
Nonpartisan	Jonathan Trumbull (incumbent)	2,209	31.30
	Scattering	4,848	68.70
Total votes		7,057	100.00
Nonpartisan hold			
