= 1784 Connecticut gubernatorial election =

- April 8, 1784
| Nominee | Matthew Griswold |
| Party | Nonpartisan |
| Popular vote | 2,192 |
| Percentage | 31.99% |
Governor before election
Jonathan Trumbull
Nonpartisan
Elected Governor
Matthew Griswold
Nonpartisan

The 1784 Connecticut gubernatorial election was held on April 8, 1784, in order to elect the Governor of Connecticut. Incumbent Nonpartisan Lieutenant Governor Matthew Griswold won a plurality of the vote in his gubernatorial election bid against other candidates. However, as no candidate received a majority of the total votes cast as was required by Connecticut law, the election was forwarded to the Connecticut legislature, who chose Griswold as governor.

== General election ==
On election day, April 8, 1784, incumbent Nonpartisan Lieutenant Governor Matthew Griswold won the election after having been chosen by the Connecticut legislature. Griswold was sworn in as the 17th Governor of Connecticut on May 13, 1784.

=== Results ===
Connecticut gubernatorial election, 1784
| Party | Candidate | Votes | % |
|---|---|---|---|
| Nonpartisan | Matthew Griswold | 2,192 | 31.99 |
| | Scattering | 4,661 | 68.01 |
| Total votes | | 6,853 | 100.00 |
| Nonpartisan hold | | | |
