= 1791 Connecticut lieutenant gubernatorial election =

- April 11, 1791
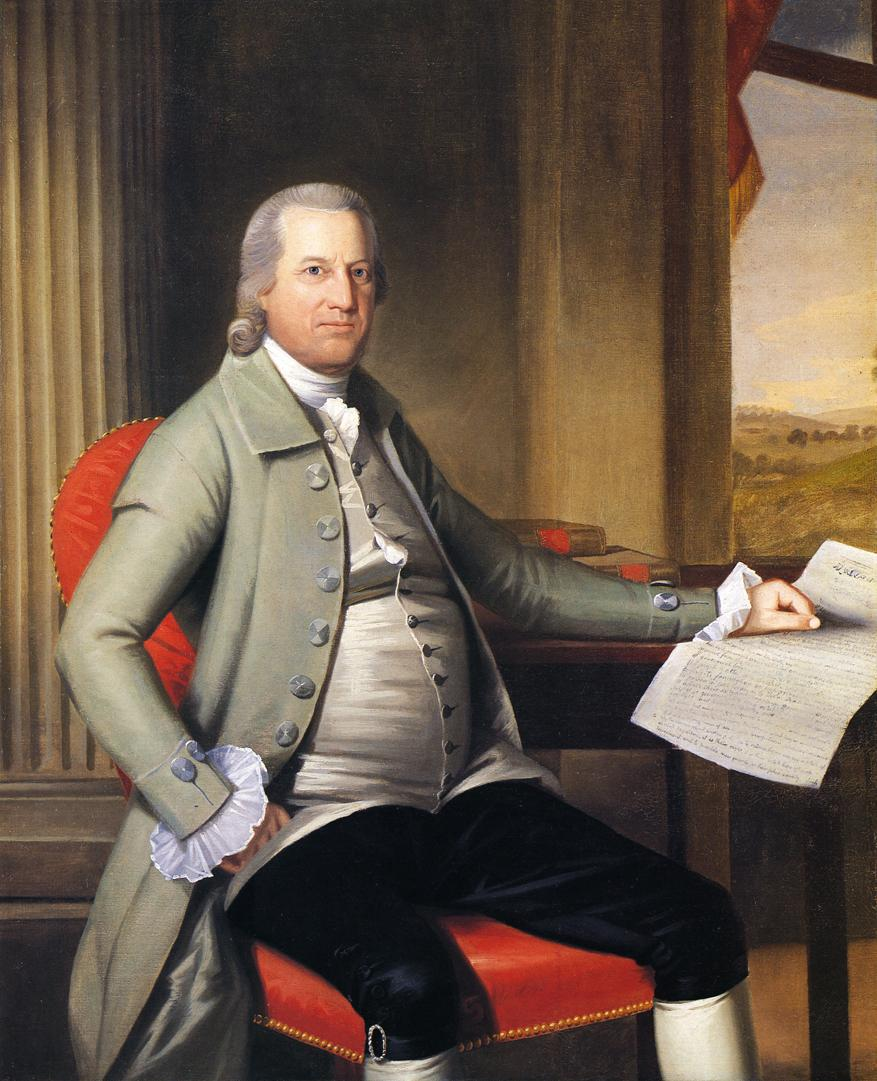
Nominee	Oliver Wolcott
Party	Federalist
Popular vote	-
Percentage	100.00%
Lieutenant Governor before election
Oliver Wolcott
Federalist
Elected Lieutenant Governor
Oliver Wolcott
Federalist

The 1791 Connecticut lieutenant gubernatorial election was held on April 11, 1791, in order to elect the lieutenant governor of Connecticut. Incumbent Federalist lieutenant governor Oliver Wolcott was re-elected unopposed by the Connecticut legislature.

== General election ==
On election day, April 11, 1791, incumbent Federalist lieutenant governor Oliver Wolcott was re-elected unopposed by the Connecticut legislature. Wolcott was sworn in for his sixth term on May 12, 1791.

=== Results ===
Connecticut lieutenant gubernatorial election, 1791
Party	Candidate	Votes	%
Federalist	Oliver Wolcott (incumbent)	-	100.00
Total votes		-	100.00
Federalist hold			
