= 1794 Connecticut lieutenant gubernatorial election =

- April 7, 1794
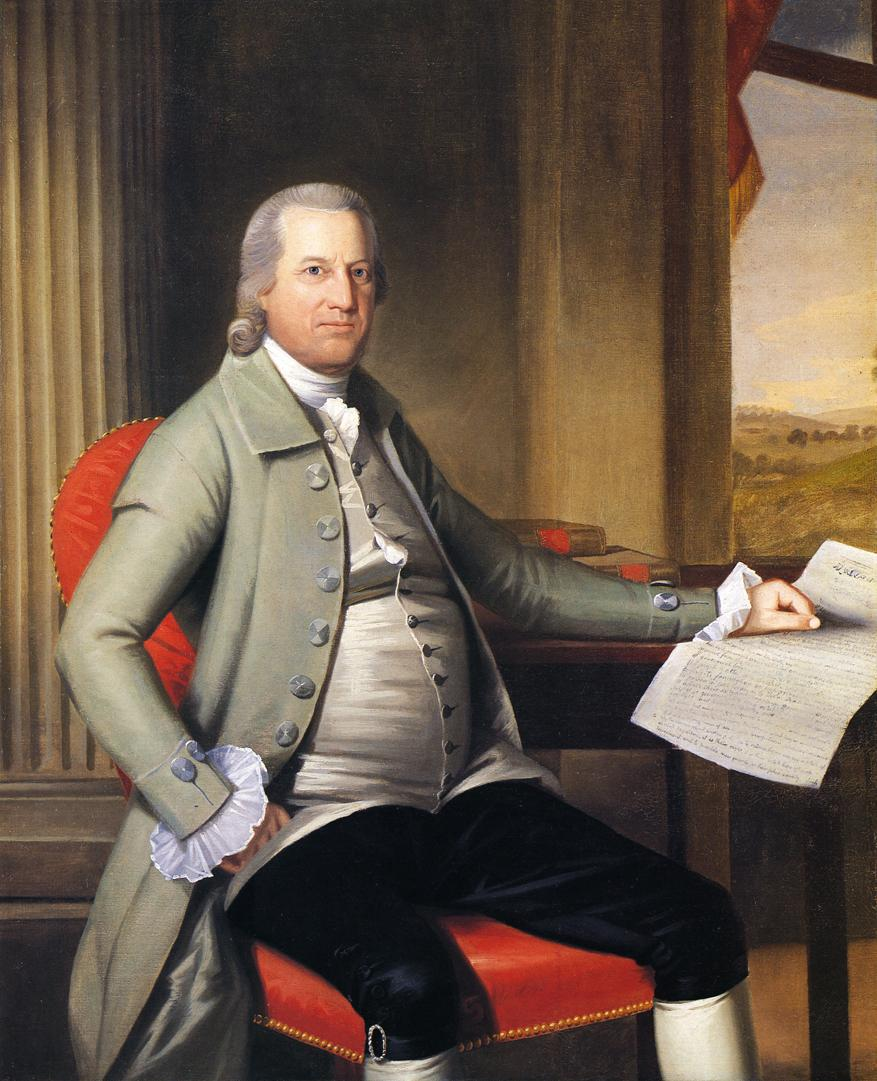
Nominee	Oliver Wolcott
Party	Federalist
Popular vote	-
Percentage	100.00%
Lieutenant Governor before election
Oliver Wolcott
Federalist
Elected Lieutenant Governor
Oliver Wolcott
Federalist

The 1794 Connecticut lieutenant gubernatorial election was held on April 7, 1794, in order to elect the lieutenant governor of Connecticut. Incumbent Federalist lieutenant governor Oliver Wolcott was re-elected unopposed by the Connecticut legislature.

== General election ==
On election day, April 7, 1794, incumbent Federalist lieutenant governor Oliver Wolcott was re-elected unopposed by the Connecticut legislature. Wolcott was sworn in for his ninth term on May 8, 1794.

=== Results ===
Connecticut lieutenant gubernatorial election, 1794
Party	Candidate	Votes	%
Federalist	Oliver Wolcott (incumbent)	-	100.00
Total votes		-	100.00
Federalist hold			
