= 1792 Maryland gubernatorial election =

- April 3, 1792
Nominee	Thomas Sim Lee
Party	Federalist
Popular vote	1
Percentage	100.00%
Governor before election
James Brice (Acting)
Federalist
Elected Governor
Thomas Sim Lee
Federalist

The 1792 Maryland gubernatorial election was held on April 3, 1792, in order to elect the Governor of Maryland, following the death of Governor George Plater in office. Federalist candidate and former Governor Thomas Sim Lee was elected by the Maryland General Assembly against other candidates to complete the term of late Governor Plater, before winning a full term in his own right on November 12, 1792. The exact results of these elections are unknown.

== General election ==
On election day, April 3, 1792, Federalist candidate and former Governor Thomas Sim Lee was elected by the Maryland General Assembly, thereby retaining Federalist control over the office of governor. Lee was sworn in for his fourth term overall on April 3, 1792, and for his fifth on November 12, 1792.

=== Results ===
Maryland gubernatorial election, 1792
Party	Candidate	Votes	%
Federalist	Thomas Sim Lee	1	100.00
Federalist	Benjamin Ogle	0	0.00
Federalist	Nicholas Carroll	0	0.00
Total votes		1	100.00
Federalist hold			
