= 1787 Connecticut gubernatorial election =

- April 12, 1787
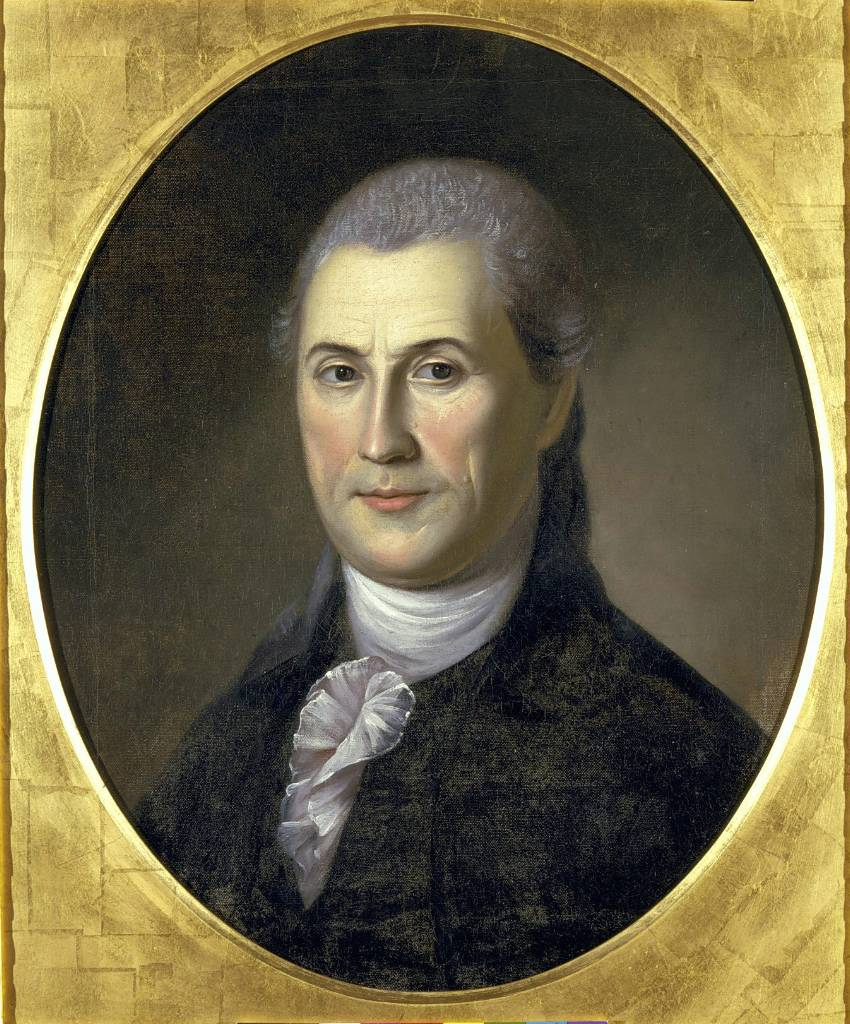
Nominee	Samuel Huntington
Party	Federalist
Popular vote	1
Percentage	100.00%
Governor before election
Samuel Huntington
Federalist
Elected Governor
Samuel Huntington
Federalist

The 1787 Connecticut gubernatorial election was held on April 12, 1787, in order to elect the Governor of Connecticut. Incumbent Federalist Governor of Connecticut Samuel Huntington unanimously won re-election as he ran unopposed.

== General election ==
On election day, April 12, 1787, Federalist nominee Samuel Huntington easily won re-election as he ran unopposed. Huntington was sworn in for his second term on May 11, 1787.

=== Results ===
Connecticut gubernatorial election, 1787
Party	Candidate	Votes	%
Federalist	Samuel Huntington (incumbent)	1	100.00
Total votes		1	100.00
Federalist hold			
