= 1791 Georgia gubernatorial election =

- November 8, 1791
| Nominee | Edward Telfair |
| Party | Democratic-Republican |
| Percentage | 100.00% |
Governor before election
Edward Telfair
Democratic-Republican
Elected Governor
Edward Telfair
Democratic-Republican

The 1791 Georgia gubernatorial election was held on November 8, 1791, in order to elect the Governor of Georgia. Democratic-Republican nominee and incumbent Governor Edward Telfair won re-election in a Georgia General Assembly vote as he ran unopposed.

== General election ==
On election day, November 8, 1791, incumbent Governor Edward Telfair won re-election as he ran unopposed. Telfair was sworn in for his third term on November 9, 1791.

=== Results ===
Georgia gubernatorial election, 1791
| Party | Candidate | Votes | % |
|---|---|---|---|
| Democratic-Republican | Edward Telfair (incumbent) | 180 | 100.00 |
| Total votes | | 180 | 100.00 |
| Democratic-Republican hold | | | |
