= 1792 Virginia gubernatorial election =

- October 25, 1792
Nominee	Henry Lee III
Party	Federalist
Governor before election
Henry Lee III
Nonpartisan
Elected Governor
Henry Lee III
Federalist

A gubernatorial election was held in Virginia on October 25, 1792. The Federalist incumbent governor of Virginia Henry Lee III was re-elected.

The election was conducted by the Virginia General Assembly in joint session. Lee was elected with a majority on the first ballot.

== General election ==
1792 Virginia gubernatorial election
Party	Candidate	First ballot	
Party	Candidate	Count	Percent
Federalist	Henry Lee III (incumbent)	**	
Total		**	100.00

== Bibliography ==
- Abernethy, Thomas P. (1961). The South in the New Nation: 1789–1819. n.p.: Louisiana State University Press.
- Hall, Wilmer L., ed. (1949). Journal of the Senate of Virginia: October Session, 1792. Richmond: Virginia State Library.
- Sobel, Robert; Raimo, John (1978). Biographical Directory of the Governors of the United States 1789–1978. Vol. 4. Westport, CT: Meckler Books.
