= 1781 Massachusetts gubernatorial election =

- April 2, 1781
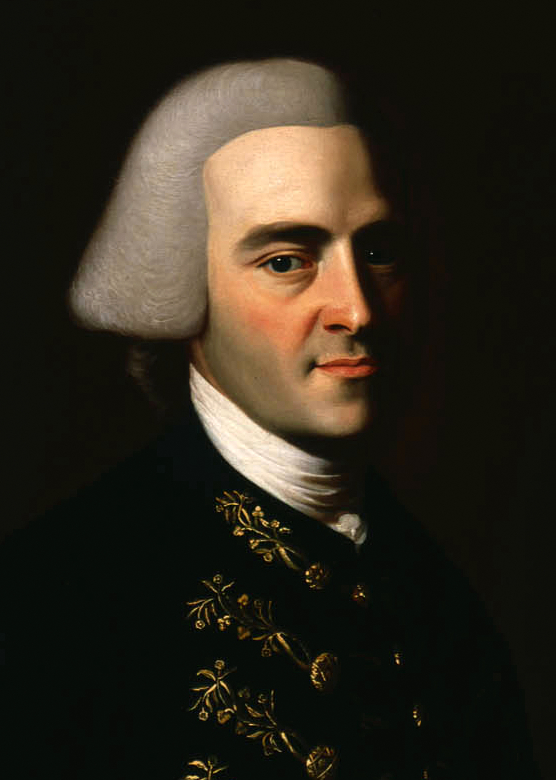

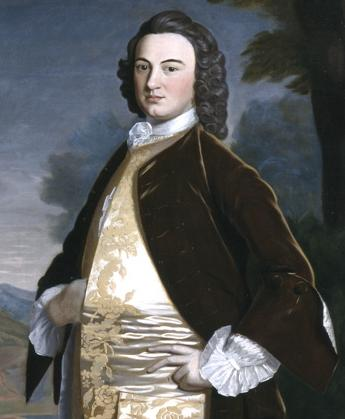
Nominee	John Hancock	James Bowdoin
Party	Nonpartisan	Nonpartisan
Popular vote	7,996	339
Percentage	93.14%	3.95%
- County results Hancock: 80–90% 90–100%
Governor before election
John Hancock
Nonpartisan
Elected Governor
John Hancock
Nonpartisan

A gubernatorial election was held in Massachusetts on April 2, 1781. John Hancock, the incumbent governor, defeated James Bowdoin, the former president of the Massachusetts Constitutional Convention.

== Results ==
1781 Massachusetts gubernatorial election
Party	Candidate	Votes	%	±%
Nonpartisan	John Hancock	7,996	93.14	+1.58
Nonpartisan	James Bowdoin	339	3.95	−4.49
Others	Scattering	250	2.91	New
