= 1786 New York gubernatorial election =

- April 25–27, 1786
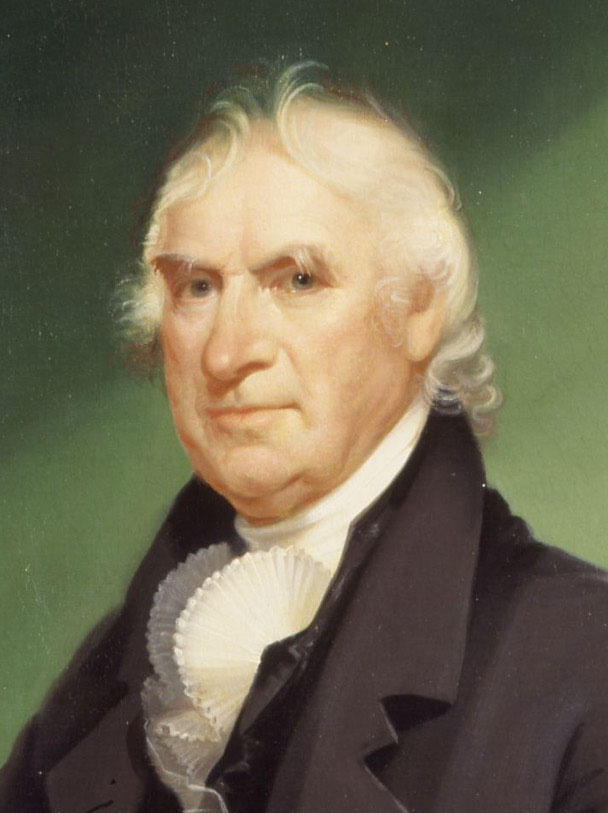
Nominee	George Clinton
Party	Nonpartisan
Governor before election
George Clinton
Nonpartisan
Elected Governor
George Clinton
Nonpartisan

A gubernatorial election was held in New York from April 25 to 27, 1786. George Clinton, the incumbent governor, was re-elected. The returns from this election have been lost.
