= 1793 Connecticut gubernatorial election =

- November 1, 1793
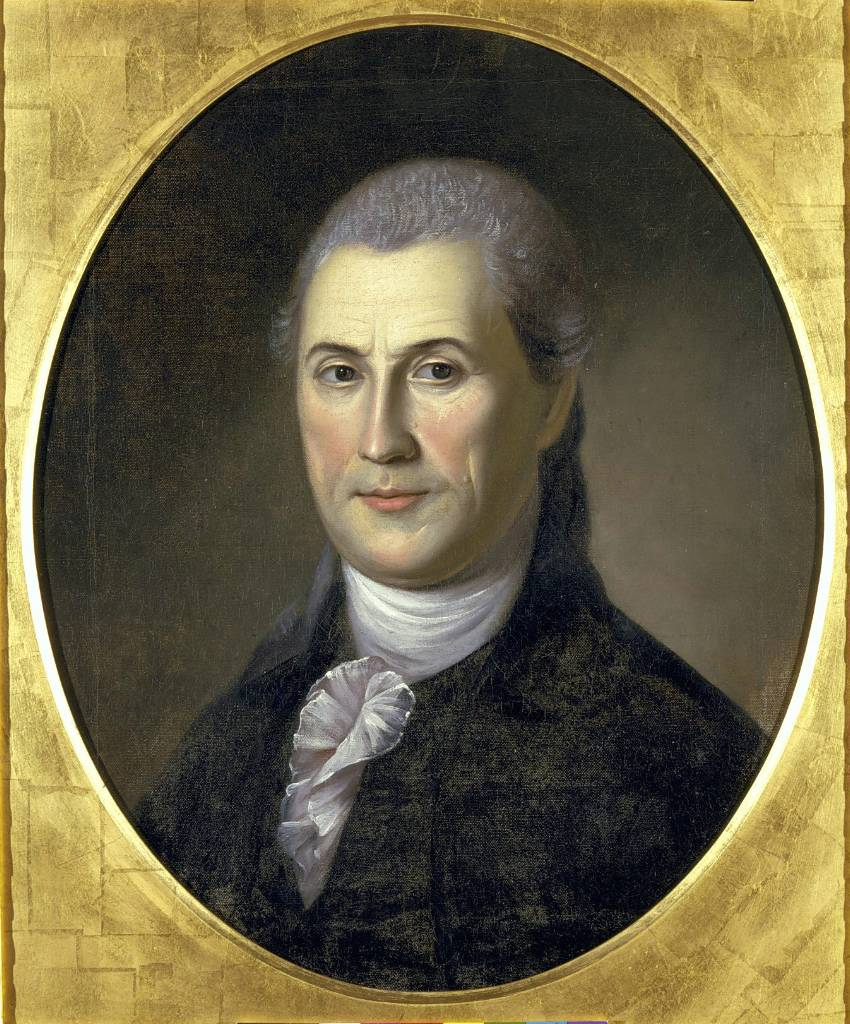
Nominee	Samuel Huntington
Party	Federalist
Popular vote	3,772
Percentage	100.00%
Governor before election
Samuel Huntington
Federalist
Elected Governor
Samuel Huntington
Federalist

The 1793 Connecticut gubernatorial election was held on November 1, 1793, in order to elect the Governor of Connecticut. Incumbent Federalist Governor of Connecticut Samuel Huntington won re-election as he ran unopposed.

== General election ==
On election day, November 1, 1793, Federalist nominee Samuel Huntington easily won re-election as he ran unopposed. Huntington was sworn in for his eighth term on December 2, 1793.

=== Results ===
Connecticut gubernatorial election, 1793
Party	Candidate	Votes	%
Federalist	Samuel Huntington (incumbent)	3,772	100.00
Total votes		3,772	100.00
Federalist hold			
