= 1795 Connecticut lieutenant gubernatorial election =

- April 13, 1795
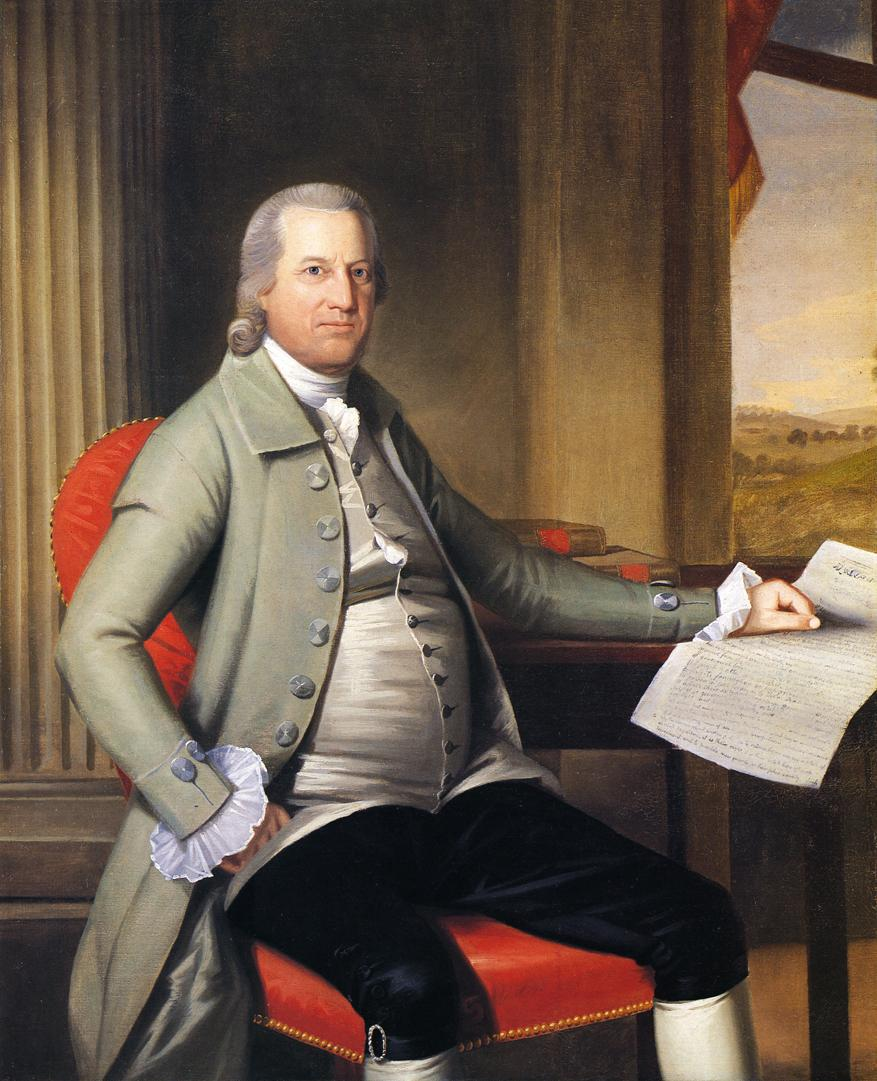
Nominee	Oliver Wolcott
Party	Federalist
Popular vote	-
Percentage	100.00%
Lieutenant Governor before election
Oliver Wolcott
Federalist
Elected Lieutenant Governor
Oliver Wolcott
Federalist

The 1795 Connecticut lieutenant gubernatorial election was held on April 13, 1795, in order to elect the lieutenant governor of Connecticut. Incumbent Federalist lieutenant governor Oliver Wolcott was re-elected unopposed by the Connecticut legislature.

== General election ==
On election day, April 13, 1795, incumbent Federalist lieutenant governor Oliver Wolcott was re-elected unopposed by the Connecticut legislature. Wolcott was sworn in for his tenth term on May 14, 1795.

=== Results ===
Connecticut lieutenant gubernatorial election, 1795
Party	Candidate	Votes	%
Federalist	Oliver Wolcott (incumbent)	-	100.00
Total votes		-	100.00
Federalist hold			
