= 1778 North Carolina gubernatorial election =

- April 18, 1778

Members of the General Assembly Majority of votes needed to win
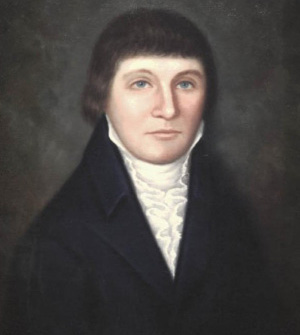
Nominee	Richard Caswell
Party	Moderate
Governor before election
Richard Caswell
Moderate
Elected Governor
Richard Caswell
Moderate

A gubernatorial election was held in North Carolina on April 18, 1778. The incumbent governor of North Carolina Richard Caswell was re-elected.

Caswell led a coalition of Western radicals and Cape Fear River moderates that dominated North Carolina politics during the late 1770s. Caswell remained personally popular in 1778 despite rising factionalism that pitted the governor's allies against the conservative minority in the legislature.

The election was conducted by the North Carolina General Assembly in joint session. Caswell was elected unanimously on the first ballot.

== Bibliography ==
- Clark, Walter, ed. (1895). The State Records of North Carolina. Vol. 12, 1777–78. Winston, NC.
- Smith, Penelope Sue (1980). Creation of an American State: Politics in North Carolina, 1765–1789 (PhD thesis). Houston: Rice University.
