= 1791 North Carolina gubernatorial election =

- December 29, 1791
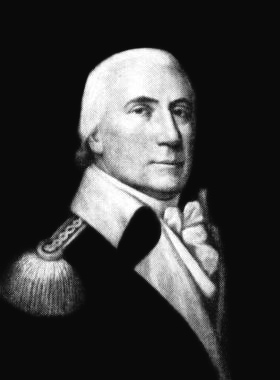

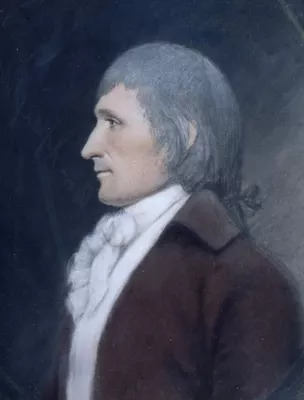
Nominee	Alexander Martin	Richard Dobbs Spaight
Party	Federalist	Federalist
Popular vote	97	60
Percentage	58.79%	36.36%
Governor before election
Alexander Martin
Federalist
Elected Governor
Alexander Martin
Federalist

The 1791 North Carolina gubernatorial election was held on December 29, 1791, in order to elect the Governor of North Carolina. Incumbent Federalist Governor Alexander Martin was re-elected by the North Carolina General Assembly against Federalist candidate Richard Dobbs Spaight, Federalist candidate and incumbent Speaker of the North Carolina Senate William Lenoir and candidate James Coor.

== General election ==
On election day, December 29, 1791, incumbent Federalist Governor Alexander Martin was re-elected by the North Carolina General Assembly by a margin of 37 votes against his foremost opponent Federalist candidate Richard Dobbs Spaight, thereby retaining Federalist control over the office of Governor. Martin was sworn in for his sixth overall term on January 2, 1792.

=== Results ===
North Carolina gubernatorial election, 1791
Party	Candidate	Votes	%
Federalist	Alexander Martin (incumbent)	97	58.79
Federalist	Richard Dobbs Spaight	60	36.36
Federalist	William Lenoir	7	4.24
	James Coor	1	0.61
Total votes		165	100.00
Federalist hold			
