= 1793 Virginia gubernatorial election =

- November 9, 1793
Nominee	Henry Lee III
Governor before election
Henry Lee III
Federalist
Elected Governor
Henry Lee III
Federalist (Note: Contemporary sources do not list parties for this election. Sobel and Raimo list Lee as a Federalist during his tenure.)

A gubernatorial election was held in Virginia on November 9, 1793. The incumbent governor of Virginia Henry Lee III was re-elected.

The election was conducted by the Virginia General Assembly. Lee was elected with a majority on the first ballot.

== General election ==
1793 Virginia gubernatorial election
Candidate	First ballot	
Candidate	Count	Percent
Henry Lee III (incumbent)	**	
Total	**	100.00

== Bibliography ==
- Reese, George H.; Hickin, Patricia, eds. (1972). Journal of the Senate of Virginia: November Session, 1793. Richmond: Virginia State Library.
- Sobel, Robert; Raimo, John (1978). Biographical Directory of the Governors of the United States 1789–1978. Vol. 4. Westport, CT: Meckler Books.
