= 1787 Virginia gubernatorial election =

- October 12, 1787
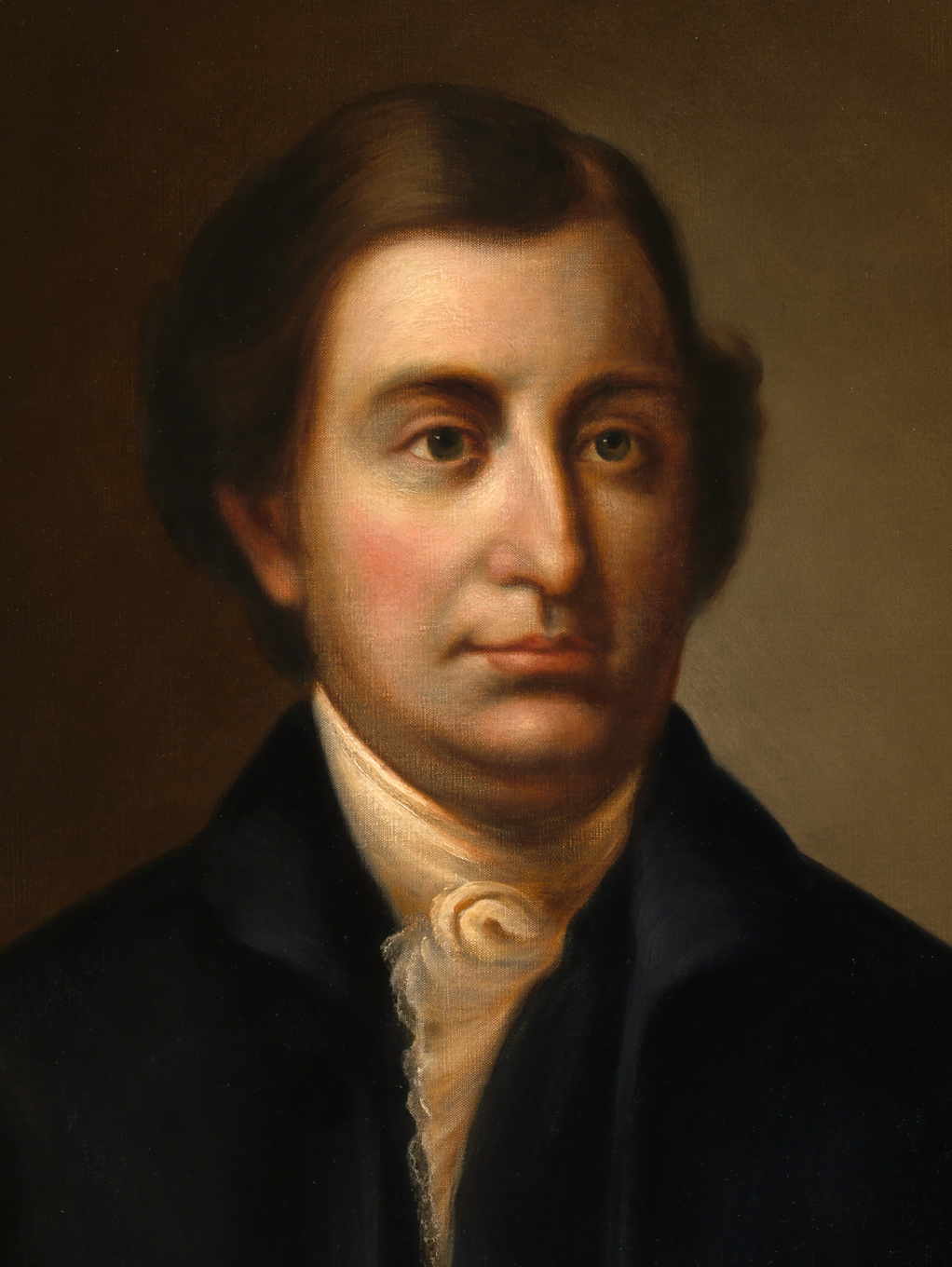
Nominee	Edmund Randolph
Governor before election
Edmund Randolph
Elected Governor
Edmund Randolph

A gubernatorial election was held in Virginia on October 12, 1787. The incumbent governor of Virginia Edmund Randolph was re-elected.

The election was conducted by the Virginia General Assembly in joint session. Randolph was selected by a majority of members on the first ballot; the official record of the proceedings does not include the names or tallied votes for any other candidates.

== General election ==
1787 Virginia gubernatorial election
Candidate	First ballot	
Candidate	Count	Percent
Edmund Randolph (incumbent)	**	
Total	**	100.00

== Bibliography ==
- Reardon, John J. (1975). Edmund Randolph: A Biography. New York: Macmillan Publishing Company.
- Virginia (1828). Journal of the House of Delegates [...]. Richmond.
