= 1782 Connecticut gubernatorial election =

- April 11, 1782
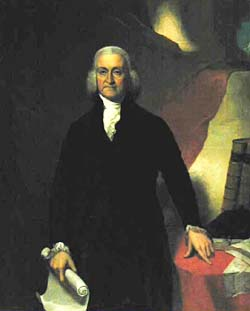
Nominee	Jonathan Trumbull
Party	Nonpartisan
Popular vote	3,025
Percentage	50.16%
Governor before election
Jonathan Trumbull
Nonpartisan
Elected Governor
Jonathan Trumbull
Nonpartisan

The 1782 Connecticut gubernatorial election was held on April 11, 1782, in order to elect the Governor of Connecticut. Incumbent Nonpartisan Governor Jonathan Trumbull won a majority of the vote in his re-election bid against other candidates.

== General election ==
On election day, April 11, 1782, incumbent Nonpartisan Governor Jonathan Trumbull won re-election against other candidates. Trumbull was sworn in for his seventh term on May 10, 1782.

=== Results ===
Connecticut gubernatorial election, 1782
Party	Candidate	Votes	%
Nonpartisan	Jonathan Trumbull (incumbent)	3,025	50.16
	Scattering	3,006	49.84
Total votes		6,031	100.00
Nonpartisan hold			
