= 1777 Connecticut gubernatorial election =

- April 10, 1777
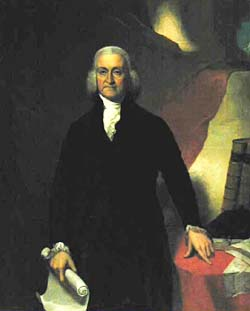
Nominee	Jonathan Trumbull
Party	Nonpartisan
Percentage	100.00%
Governor before election
Jonathan Trumbull
Nonpartisan
Elected Governor
Jonathan Trumbull
Nonpartisan

The 1777 Connecticut gubernatorial election was held on April 10, 1777, in order to elect the Governor of Connecticut. Incumbent Nonpartisan Governor Jonathan Trumbull won re-election as he ran unopposed. The exact number of votes cast in this election is unknown.

== General election ==
On election day, April 10, 1777, incumbent Nonpartisan Governor Jonathan Trumbull easily won re-election as he ran unopposed. Trumbull was sworn in for his second term on May 10, 1777.

=== Results ===
Connecticut gubernatorial election, 1777
Party	Candidate	Votes	%
Nonpartisan	Jonathan Trumbull (incumbent)	Unknown	100.00
Total votes		Unknown	100.00
Nonpartisan hold			
