= List of governors of North Carolina =

List of heads of government in the state of North Carolina

The governor of North Carolina is the head of government of the U.S. state of North Carolina and commander-in-chief of the state's military forces.

There have been 70 governors of North Carolina, with six serving non-consecutive terms, totaling 76 terms. The current governor is Democrat Josh Stein, who took office on January 1, 2025.

== Governors ==
=== Presidents of the Council ===
Prior to declaring its independence, North Carolina was a colony of the Kingdom of Great Britain. The 13-member Provincial Council, renamed the Council of Safety in April 1776, was essentially the executive authority during the second year of the revolution, and was appointed by the Provincial Congress. The Presidency of the Council and the Presidency of the Congress could each be considered the highest offices in the state during this time, but the council was supreme when the congress was not in session.

Cornelius Harnett served as the first president from October 18, 1775, to August 21, 1776. Samuel Ashe then served until September 27, 1776, and Willie Jones until October 25, 1776, at which time a state government had been formed.

=== State governors ===
North Carolina was one of the original Thirteen Colonies, and was admitted as a state on November 21, 1789. It seceded from the Union on May 20, 1861, and joined the Confederate States of America on May 21, 1861. Following the end of the American Civil War, North Carolina during Reconstruction was part of the Second Military District, which exerted some control over governor appointments and elections. North Carolina was readmitted to the Union on July 4, 1868.

The first constitution of 1776 created the office of governor, to be chosen by the legislature annually, and whom may only serve up to three out of every six years. An amendment in 1835 changed this to popular election for a term of two years, allowing them to succeed themselves once. The 1868 constitution lengthened terms to four years, to commence on the first day of January after the election, but they could not succeed themselves, a limit that was changed in 1977 to allow them to succeed themselves once.

The office of lieutenant governor was created in 1868, to act as governor when that office is vacant; in 1971 this was changed so that the lieutenant governor becomes governor. Before the office was created, the speaker of the senate would act as governor should it be vacant. The governor and the lieutenant governor are not officially elected on the same ticket.

Governors of the State of North Carolina
No.	Governor	Term in office	Party	Election	Lt. Governor (Note: The office of lieutenant governor was created in 1868.) (Note: Lieutenant governors represented the same party as their governor unless noted.)
1	Richard Caswell (1729–1789)	December 23, 1776 (Note: The journal of the Fifth North Carolina Provincial Congress indicates the ordinance appointing Caswell passed on December 20; Caswell's term was to begin immediately following the dissolution of the Congress, which occurred on December 23. Sources disagree on when Caswell actually took office. The 1913 state manual says Caswell's governorship began on December 19, the 1981 state manual says December 21, while a biography from 1905 says it was December 24. Contemporaneous press accounts stated that Caswell took the oath of office at New Bern, North Carolina, on January 10, 1777.) – April 21, 1780 (1216 days; term-limited) (Note: Under the 1776 constitution, governors were ineligible to hold the office more than three years in six successive years.)	No parties	Appointed by the Provincial; Congress	Office did not exist
1	Richard Caswell (1729–1789)	December 23, 1776 – April 21, 1780 (1216 days; term-limited)	No parties	1777	Office did not exist
1	Richard Caswell (1729–1789)	December 23, 1776 – April 21, 1780 (1216 days; term-limited)	No parties	1778	Office did not exist
1	Richard Caswell (1729–1789)	December 23, 1776 – April 21, 1780 (1216 days; term-limited)	No parties	1779	Office did not exist
2	Abner Nash (1740–1786)	April 21, 1780 – June 26, 1781 (432 days; retired)	No parties	1780	Office did not exist
3	Thomas Burke (Note: Burke was captured by Loyalists led by David Fanning on September 13, 1781, and escaped on January 16, 1782; during this time, Speaker of the Senate Alexander Martin acted as governor.) (1747–1783)	June 26, 1781 – April 22, 1782 (301 days; retired)	No parties	1781	Office did not exist
4	Alexander Martin (1740–1807)	April 22, 1782 – May 13, 1785 (1118 days; retired)	No parties	1782	Office did not exist
4	Alexander Martin (1740–1807)	April 22, 1782 – May 13, 1785 (1118 days; retired)	No parties	1783	Office did not exist
4	Alexander Martin (1740–1807)	April 22, 1782 – May 13, 1785 (1118 days; retired)	No parties	1784	Office did not exist
5	Richard Caswell (1729–1789)	May 13, 1785 – December 20, 1787 (952 days; retired)	No parties	1785	Office did not exist
5	Richard Caswell (1729–1789)	May 13, 1785 – December 20, 1787 (952 days; retired)	No parties	1786	Office did not exist
6	Samuel Johnston (1733–1816)	December 20, 1787 – December 17, 1789 (729 days; resigned) (Note: Johnston resigned, having been elected to the United States Senate.)	Federalist	1787	Office did not exist
6	Samuel Johnston (1733–1816)	December 20, 1787 – December 17, 1789 (729 days; resigned)	Federalist	1788	Office did not exist
6	Samuel Johnston (1733–1816)	December 20, 1787 – December 17, 1789 (729 days; resigned)	Federalist	^{Nov.}1789	Office did not exist
7	Alexander Martin (1740–1807)	December 17, 1789 – December 14, 1792 (1094 days; term-limited)	Federalist	^{Dec.}1789 (special)	Office did not exist
7	Alexander Martin (1740–1807)	December 17, 1789 – December 14, 1792 (1094 days; term-limited)	Federalist	1790	Office did not exist
7	Alexander Martin (1740–1807)	December 17, 1789 – December 14, 1792 (1094 days; term-limited)	Federalist	1791	Office did not exist
8	Richard Dobbs Spaight (1758–1802)	December 14, 1792 – November 19, 1795 (1071 days; term-limited)	Federalist (Note: Spaight is labeled a Federalist by Kallenbach, and a Democratic-Republican by Glashan.)	1792	Office did not exist
8	Richard Dobbs Spaight (1758–1802)	December 14, 1792 – November 19, 1795 (1071 days; term-limited)	Federalist	1793	Office did not exist
8	Richard Dobbs Spaight (1758–1802)	December 14, 1792 – November 19, 1795 (1071 days; term-limited)	Federalist	1794	Office did not exist
9	Samuel Ashe (1725–1813)	November 19, 1795 – December 7, 1798 (1115 days; term-limited)	Democratic- Republican (Note: Ashe is labeled an Anti-Federalist by Kallenbach, and a Democratic-Republican by Dubin and Glashan.)	1795	Office did not exist
9	Samuel Ashe (1725–1813)	November 19, 1795 – December 7, 1798 (1115 days; term-limited)	Democratic- Republican	1796	Office did not exist
9	Samuel Ashe (1725–1813)	November 19, 1795 – December 7, 1798 (1115 days; term-limited)	Democratic- Republican	1797	Office did not exist
10	William Richardson Davie (1756–1820)	December 7, 1798 – November 23, 1799 (352 days; retired) (Note: Some sources say Davie resigned on September 10, 1799, to be a peace envoy to France; however, the state manual does not mention a resignation, and other sources say that, while he left the state, he arranged to formally remain governor.)	Federalist	1798	Office did not exist
11	Benjamin Williams (1751–1814)	November 23, 1799 – December 6, 1802 (1109 days; term-limited)	Federalist (Note: Kallenbach labels Williams a Democratic-Republican, but Glashan and Lampi label him a Federalist.)	1799	Office did not exist
11	Benjamin Williams (1751–1814)	November 23, 1799 – December 6, 1802 (1109 days; term-limited)	Federalist	1800	Office did not exist
11	Benjamin Williams (1751–1814)	November 23, 1799 – December 6, 1802 (1109 days; term-limited)	Federalist	1801	Office did not exist
—	John Baptist Ashe (1748–1802)	Died before taking office	Democratic- Republican	^{Nov.}1802	Office did not exist
12	James Turner (1766–1824)	December 6, 1802 – December 10, 1805 (1101 days; term-limited) (Note: Turner, being term-limited, had already won election to the United States Senate when his term ended.)	Democratic- Republican	^{Dec.}1802 (special)	Office did not exist
12	James Turner (1766–1824)	December 6, 1802 – December 10, 1805 (1101 days; term-limited)	Democratic- Republican	1803	Office did not exist
12	James Turner (1766–1824)	December 6, 1802 – December 10, 1805 (1101 days; term-limited)	Democratic- Republican	1804	Office did not exist
13	Nathaniel Alexander (1756–1808)	December 10, 1805 – December 1, 1807 (722 days; retired)	Democratic- Republican	1805	Office did not exist
13	Nathaniel Alexander (1756–1808)	December 10, 1805 – December 1, 1807 (722 days; retired)	Democratic- Republican	1806	Office did not exist
14	Benjamin Williams (1751–1814)	December 1, 1807 – December 12, 1808 (378 days; lost election)	Federalist	1807	Office did not exist
15	David Stone (1770–1818)	December 12, 1808 – December 5, 1810 (724 days; lost election)	Democratic- Republican	1808	Office did not exist
15	David Stone (1770–1818)	December 12, 1808 – December 5, 1810 (724 days; lost election)	Democratic- Republican	1809	Office did not exist
16	Benjamin Smith (1756–1826)	December 5, 1810 – December 9, 1811 (370 days; retired) (Note: Smith was nominated and received votes in the first round of balloting, but he had not authorized this and was not interested, so his name was withdrawn.)	Democratic- Republican	1810	Office did not exist
17	William Hawkins (1777–1819)	December 9, 1811 – December 7, 1814 (1095 days; term-limited)	Democratic- Republican	1811	Office did not exist
17	William Hawkins (1777–1819)	December 9, 1811 – December 7, 1814 (1095 days; term-limited)	Democratic- Republican	1812	Office did not exist
17	William Hawkins (1777–1819)	December 9, 1811 – December 7, 1814 (1095 days; term-limited)	Democratic- Republican	1813	Office did not exist
18	William Miller (1783–1825)	December 7, 1814 – December 6, 1817 (1096 days; term-limited)	Democratic- Republican	1814	Office did not exist
18	William Miller (1783–1825)	December 7, 1814 – December 6, 1817 (1096 days; term-limited)	Democratic- Republican	1815	Office did not exist
18	William Miller (1783–1825)	December 7, 1814 – December 6, 1817 (1096 days; term-limited)	Democratic- Republican	1816	Office did not exist
19	John Branch (1782–1863)	December 6, 1817 – December 7, 1820 (1098 days; term-limited)	Democratic- Republican	1817	Office did not exist
19	John Branch (1782–1863)	December 6, 1817 – December 7, 1820 (1098 days; term-limited)	Democratic- Republican	1818	Office did not exist
19	John Branch (1782–1863)	December 6, 1817 – December 7, 1820 (1098 days; term-limited)	Democratic- Republican	1819	Office did not exist
20	Jesse Franklin (1760–1823)	December 7, 1820 – December 7, 1821 (366 days; retired)	Democratic- Republican	1820	Office did not exist
21	Gabriel Holmes (1769–1829)	December 7, 1821 – December 7, 1824 (1097 days; term-limited)	Democratic- Republican	1821	Office did not exist
21	Gabriel Holmes (1769–1829)	December 7, 1821 – December 7, 1824 (1097 days; term-limited)	Democratic- Republican	1822	Office did not exist
21	Gabriel Holmes (1769–1829)	December 7, 1821 – December 7, 1824 (1097 days; term-limited)	Democratic- Republican	1823	Office did not exist
22	Hutchins Gordon Burton (1774–1836)	December 7, 1824 – December 8, 1827 (1097 days; term-limited)	Democratic- Republican (Note: Glashan and Kallenbach label Burton a Democratic-Republican, but Sobel & Raimo label him a Federalist.)	1824	Office did not exist
22	Hutchins Gordon Burton (1774–1836)	December 7, 1824 – December 8, 1827 (1097 days; term-limited)	Democratic- Republican	1825	Office did not exist
22	Hutchins Gordon Burton (1774–1836)	December 7, 1824 – December 8, 1827 (1097 days; term-limited)	Democratic- Republican	1826	Office did not exist
23	James Iredell Jr. (1788–1853)	December 8, 1827 – December 12, 1828 (371 days; retired) (Note: Iredell was instead elected to the United States Senate on December 1; while Sobel & Raimo say he resigned to take his new office, contemporary sources mention no such resignation.)	Democratic- Republican	1827	Office did not exist
24	John Owen (1787–1841)	December 12, 1828 – December 18, 1830 (737 days; retired) (Note: Sobel & Raimo say Owen had been nominated and withdrew, but contemporary sources say only that he requested not to be nominated.)	Democratic- Republican (Note: Glashan and Kallenbach label Owen a Democratic-Republican, while Sobel & Raimo say he was a "National Republican with Federalist sympathies.")	1828	Office did not exist
24	John Owen (1787–1841)	December 12, 1828 – December 18, 1830 (737 days; retired)	Democratic- Republican	1829	Office did not exist
25	Montfort Stokes (1762–1842)	December 18, 1830 – December 6, 1832 (720 days; retired) (Note: Stokes was appointed to be a commissioner to treat with Indians, and sent a farewell message to the general assembly on November 19. Some sources, both modern and older, interpret this as him resigning; however, the 1927 manual says he left office normally on December 6, and contemporary news does not use any term of resignation.)	Democratic- Republican (Note: Glashan and Kallenbach label Stokes a Democratic-Republican, while Dubin labels him a Democrat.)	1830	Office did not exist
25	Montfort Stokes (1762–1842)	December 18, 1830 – December 6, 1832 (720 days; retired)	Democratic- Republican	1831	Office did not exist
26	David L. Swain (1801–1868)	December 6, 1832 – December 10, 1835 (1100 days; term-limited)	National; Republican (Note: Swain is labeled a Democrat by Dubin, a National Republican by Glashan, a Democratic-Republican by Kallenbach, and a Whig by Sobel & Raimo.)	1832	Office did not exist
26	David L. Swain (1801–1868)	December 6, 1832 – December 10, 1835 (1100 days; term-limited)	National; Republican	1833	Office did not exist
26	David L. Swain (1801–1868)	December 6, 1832 – December 10, 1835 (1100 days; term-limited)	National; Republican	1834	Office did not exist
27	Richard Dobbs Spaight Jr. (1796–1850)	December 10, 1835 – December 31, 1836 (388 days; lost election)	Democratic	1835	Office did not exist
28	Edward Bishop Dudley (1789–1855)	December 31, 1836 – January 1, 1841 (1463 days; term-limited) (Note: Under an 1835 amendment to the constitution, governors were ineligible to hold the office more than four years in six successive years.)	Whig	1836	Office did not exist
28	Edward Bishop Dudley (1789–1855)	December 31, 1836 – January 1, 1841 (1463 days; term-limited)	Whig	1838	Office did not exist
29	John Motley Morehead (1796–1866)	January 1, 1841 – January 1, 1845 (1462 days; term-limited)	Whig	1840	Office did not exist
29	John Motley Morehead (1796–1866)	January 1, 1841 – January 1, 1845 (1462 days; term-limited)	Whig	1842	Office did not exist
30	William Alexander Graham (1804–1875)	January 1, 1845 – January 1, 1849 (1462 days; term-limited)	Whig	1844	Office did not exist
30	William Alexander Graham (1804–1875)	January 1, 1845 – January 1, 1849 (1462 days; term-limited)	Whig	1846	Office did not exist
31	Charles Manly (1795–1871)	January 1, 1849 – January 1, 1851 (731 days; lost election)	Whig	1848	Office did not exist
32	David Settle Reid (1813–1891)	January 1, 1851 – December 6, 1854 (1436 days; resigned) (Note: Reid resigned, having been elected to the United States Senate.)	Democratic	1850	Office did not exist
32	David Settle Reid (1813–1891)	January 1, 1851 – December 6, 1854 (1436 days; resigned)	Democratic	1852	Office did not exist
33	Warren Winslow (1810–1862)	December 6, 1854 – January 1, 1855 (27 days; retired)	Democratic	Speaker of the Senate acting	Office did not exist
34	Thomas Bragg (1810–1872)	January 1, 1855 – January 1, 1859 (1462 days; term-limited)	Democratic	1854	Office did not exist
34	Thomas Bragg (1810–1872)	January 1, 1855 – January 1, 1859 (1462 days; term-limited)	Democratic	1856	Office did not exist
35	John Willis Ellis (1820–1861)	January 1, 1859 – July 7, 1861 (919 days; died in office)	Democratic	1858	Office did not exist
35	John Willis Ellis (1820–1861)	January 1, 1859 – July 7, 1861 (919 days; died in office)	Democratic	1860	Office did not exist
36	Henry Toole Clark (1808–1874)	July 7, 1861 – September 8, 1862 (429 days; retired)	Democratic	Speaker of the Senate acting	Office did not exist
37	Zebulon Vance (Note: After the Union victory in the Battle of New Bern, Abraham Lincoln appointed General Edward Stanly as military governor of the Union-held regions of North Carolina, and he served in that capacity from May 26, 1862, until early 1863, when he resigned over the Emancipation Proclamation.) (1830–1894)	September 8, 1862 – May 13, 1865 (979 days; arrested and removed) (Note: Vance left Raleigh on April 12 to negotiate a surrender, surrendered to General John Schofield on May 2, and was arrested in Statesville on May 13. He was released a few weeks later, and would be pardoned by Andrew Johnson in 1867.)	Conservative	1862	Office did not exist
37	Zebulon Vance (1830–1894)	September 8, 1862 – May 13, 1865 (979 days; arrested and removed)	Conservative	1864	Office did not exist
—	Vacant	May 13, 1865 – May 29, 1865 (17 days)	Office vacated after civil war		Office did not exist
38	William Woods Holden (1818–1892)	May 29, 1865 – December 15, 1865 (201 days; lost election)	Provisional governor appointed by President		Office did not exist
39	Jonathan Worth (1802–1869)	December 15, 1865 – July 1, 1868 (930 days; retired)	Conservative	1865	Office did not exist
39	Jonathan Worth (1802–1869)	December 15, 1865 – July 1, 1868 (930 days; retired)	Conservative	1866	Office did not exist
40	William Woods Holden (1818–1892)	July 1, 1868 – March 22, 1871 (995 days; impeached and removed) (Note: Holden was impeached over crimes committed during the Kirk–Holden war against the Ku Klux Klan.)	Republican	1868	Tod Robinson Caldwell
41	Tod Robinson Caldwell (1818–1874)	March 22, 1871 (Note: Holden was impeached on December 19, 1870; per the constitution, Caldwell became acting governor, and served in that capacity until and after Holden was convicted and removed on March 22, 1871.) – July 11, 1874 (1208 days; died in office)	Republican	Lieutenant governor acting	Acting as governor
41	Tod Robinson Caldwell (1818–1874)	March 22, 1871 – July 11, 1874 (1208 days; died in office)	Republican	1872	Curtis Hooks Brogden
42	Curtis Hooks Brogden (1816–1901)	July 11, 1874 – January 1, 1877 (906 days; retired) (Note: Brogden was instead elected to the United States House of Representatives.)	Republican	Lieutenant governor acting	Acting as governor
43	Zebulon Vance (1830–1894)	January 1, 1877 – February 5, 1879 (766 days; resigned) (Note: Vance resigned, having been elected to the United States Senate.)	Democratic	1876	Thomas J. Jarvis
44	Thomas J. Jarvis (1836–1915)	February 5, 1879 – January 21, 1885 (2178 days; term-limited) (Note: Under the 1868 constitution, governors were ineligible to hold the office more than four years in eight successive years.)	Democratic	Lieutenant governor acting	Acting as governor
44	Thomas J. Jarvis (1836–1915)	February 5, 1879 – January 21, 1885 (2178 days; term-limited)	Democratic	1880	James L. Robinson (Note: Robinson acted as governor from September 1 to September 28, 1883, while Jarvis was out of state.)
45	Alfred Moore Scales (1827–1892)	January 21, 1885 – January 17, 1889 (1458 days; term-limited)	Democratic	1884	Charles Manly Stedman
46	Daniel Gould Fowle (1831–1891)	January 17, 1889 – April 7, 1891 (811 days; died in office)	Democratic	1888	Thomas Michael Holt
47	Thomas Michael Holt (1831–1896)	April 7, 1891 – January 18, 1893 (653 days; lost nomination)	Democratic	Lieutenant governor acting	Acting as governor
48	Elias Carr (1839–1900)	January 18, 1893 – January 12, 1897 (1456 days; term-limited)	Democratic	1892	Rufus A. Doughton
49	Daniel Lindsay Russell (1845–1908)	January 12, 1897 – January 15, 1901 (1464 days; term-limited)	Republican	1896	Charles A. Reynolds
50	Charles Brantley Aycock (1859–1912)	January 15, 1901 – January 11, 1905 (1458 days; term-limited)	Democratic	1900	Wilfred D. Turner
51	Robert Broadnax Glenn (1854–1920)	January 11, 1905 – January 12, 1909 (1463 days; term-limited)	Democratic	1904	Francis D. Winston
52	William Walton Kitchin (1866–1924)	January 12, 1909 – January 15, 1913 (1465 days; term-limited)	Democratic	1908	William C. Newland
53	Locke Craig (1860–1924)	January 15, 1913 – January 11, 1917 (1458 days; term-limited)	Democratic	1912	Elijah L. Daughtridge
54	Thomas Walter Bickett (1869–1921)	January 11, 1917 – January 12, 1921 (1463 days; term-limited)	Democratic	1916	Oliver Max Gardner
55	Cameron A. Morrison (1869–1953)	January 12, 1921 – January 14, 1925 (1464 days; term-limited)	Democratic	1920	William B. Cooper
56	Angus Wilton McLean (1870–1935)	January 14, 1925 – January 11, 1929 (1459 days; term-limited)	Democratic	1924	J. Elmer Long
57	Oliver Max Gardner (1882–1947)	January 11, 1929 – January 5, 1933 (1456 days; term-limited)	Democratic	1928	Richard T. Fountain
58	John C. B. Ehringhaus (1882–1949)	January 5, 1933 – January 7, 1937 (1464 days; term-limited)	Democratic	1932	Alexander H. Graham
59	Clyde R. Hoey (1877–1954)	January 7, 1937 – January 9, 1941 (1464 days; term-limited)	Democratic	1936	Wilkins P. Horton
60	J. Melville Broughton (1888–1949)	January 9, 1941 – January 4, 1945 (1457 days; term-limited)	Democratic	1940	Reginald L. Harris
61	R. Gregg Cherry (1891–1957)	January 4, 1945 – January 6, 1949 (1464 days; term-limited)	Democratic	1944	Lynton Y. Ballentine
62	W. Kerr Scott (1896–1958)	January 6, 1949 – January 8, 1953 (1464 days; term-limited)	Democratic	1948	Hoyt Patrick Taylor
63	William B. Umstead (1895–1954)	January 8, 1953 – November 7, 1954 (669 days; died in office)	Democratic	1952	Luther H. Hodges
64	Luther H. Hodges (1898–1974)	November 7, 1954 – January 5, 1961 (2252 days; term-limited)	Democratic	Lieutenant governor acting	Acting as governor
64	Luther H. Hodges (1898–1974)	November 7, 1954 – January 5, 1961 (2252 days; term-limited)	Democratic	1956	Luther E. Barnhardt
65	Terry Sanford (1917–1998)	January 5, 1961 – January 8, 1965 (1465 days; term-limited) (Note: Under a 1962 amendment to the constitution, governors were ineligible to succeed themselves.)	Democratic	1960	Harvey Cloyd Philpott
65	Terry Sanford (1917–1998)	January 5, 1961 – January 8, 1965 (1465 days; term-limited)	Democratic	1960	Vacant
66	Dan K. Moore (1906–1986)	January 8, 1965 – January 3, 1969 (1457 days; term-limited)	Democratic	1964	Robert W. Scott
67	Robert W. Scott (1929–2009)	January 3, 1969 – January 5, 1973 (1464 days; term-limited) (Note: Under the 1971 constitution, governors were ineligible to succeed themselves.)	Democratic	1968	Hoyt Patrick Taylor Jr.
68	James Holshouser (1934–2013)	January 5, 1973 – January 8, 1977 (1465 days; term-limited)	Republican	1972	Jim Hunt (Note: Represented the Democratic Party)
69	Jim Hunt (1937–2025)	January 8, 1977 – January 5, 1985 (2920 days; term-limited) (Note: Hunt, being term-limited, (Note: Under a 1977 amendment to the constitution, governors are ineligible for election to more than two consecutive terms.) had already lost election to the United States Senate when his term ended.)	Democratic	1976	James C. Green
69	Jim Hunt (1937–2025)	January 8, 1977 – January 5, 1985 (2920 days; term-limited)	Democratic	1980	James C. Green
70	James G. Martin (b. 1935)	January 5, 1985 – January 9, 1993 (2927 days; term-limited)	Republican	1984	Robert B. Jordan
70	James G. Martin (b. 1935)	January 5, 1985 – January 9, 1993 (2927 days; term-limited)	Republican	1988	Jim Gardner
71	Jim Hunt (1937–2025)	January 9, 1993 – January 6, 2001 (2920 days; term-limited)	Democratic	1992	Dennis A. Wicker
71	Jim Hunt (1937–2025)	January 9, 1993 – January 6, 2001 (2920 days; term-limited)	Democratic	1996	Dennis A. Wicker
72	Mike Easley (b. 1950)	January 6, 2001 – January 10, 2009 (2927 days; term-limited)	Democratic	2000	Bev Perdue
72	Mike Easley (b. 1950)	January 6, 2001 – January 10, 2009 (2927 days; term-limited)	Democratic	2004	Bev Perdue
73	Bev Perdue (b. 1947)	January 10, 2009 – January 5, 2013 (1457 days; retired)	Democratic	2008	Walter Dalton
74	Pat McCrory (b. 1956)	January 5, 2013 – January 1, 2017 (1458 days; lost election)	Republican	2012	Dan Forest (Note: Represented the Republican Party)
75	Roy Cooper (b. 1957)	January 1, 2017 – January 1, 2025 (2923 days; term-limited)	Democratic	2016	Dan Forest
75	Roy Cooper (b. 1957)	January 1, 2017 – January 1, 2025 (2923 days; term-limited)	Democratic	2020	Mark Robinson
76	Josh Stein (b. 1966)	January 1, 2025 – Incumbent (Note: Stein's term will expire in January 2029.) (in office 691 days)	Democratic	2024	Rachel Hunt

== See also ==
- Gubernatorial lines of succession in the United States § North Carolina
- First ladies and gentlemen of North Carolina
- Lieutenant Governor of North Carolina
- List of colonial governors of North Carolina
- List of North Carolina state legislatures

== Sources ==
- "Former North Carolina Governors". National Governors Association.
- "North Carolina Constitution". State Democracy Research Initiative. University of Wisconsin Law School.
- Dubin, Michael J. (2003). United States Gubernatorial Elections, 1776–1860: The Official Results by State and County. McFarland. ISBN 0-7864-1439-1 – via Internet Archive.
- Glashan, Roy R. (1979). American Governors and Gubernatorial Elections, 1775-1978. Meckler Books. ISBN 0-7201-1511-6 – via Internet Archive.
- Kallenbach, Joseph E.; Kallenbach, Jessamine S. (1977). American State Governors, 1776-1976. Oceana Publications. ISBN 978-0-379-00665-0 – via Internet Archive.
- Mullaney, Marie Marmo (1994). Biographical Directory of the Governors of the United States, 1988–1994. Greenwood Publishing Group. ISBN 0-313-28312-5 – via Internet Archive.
- Sobel, Robert; Raimo, John (1978). Biographical Directory of the Governors of the United States, 1789-1978. Vol. 3. Meckler Books. ISBN 0-930466-01-2 – via Internet Archive.
- Thorpe, Francis Newton, ed. (1909). The Federal and State Constitutions, Colonial Charters, and Other Organic Laws of the States, Territories, and Colonies Now or Heretofore Forming the United States of America. Vol. 5. United States Government Publishing Office – via Internet Archive.
