= 1787 North Carolina gubernatorial election =

- December 1787
Nominee	Samuel Johnston
Party	Federalist
Popular vote	1
Percentage	100.00%
Governor before election
Richard Caswell
Nonpartisan
Elected Governor
Samuel Johnston
Federalist

The 1787 North Carolina gubernatorial election was held in December 1787 in order to elect the Governor of North Carolina. Federalist nominee Samuel Johnston was elected by the North Carolina General Assembly as he ran unopposed. The exact number of votes cast in this election is unknown.

== General election ==
On election day in December 1787, Federalist nominee Samuel Johnston was elected by the North Carolina General Assembly, thereby gaining Federalist control over the office of Governor. Johnston was sworn in as the 6th Governor of North Carolina on December 20, 1787.

=== Results ===
North Carolina gubernatorial election, 1787
Party	Candidate	Votes	%
Federalist	Samuel Johnston	1	100.00
Total votes		1	100.00
Federalist gain from Nonpartisan			
