= 1811 North Carolina gubernatorial election =

- December 7, 1811
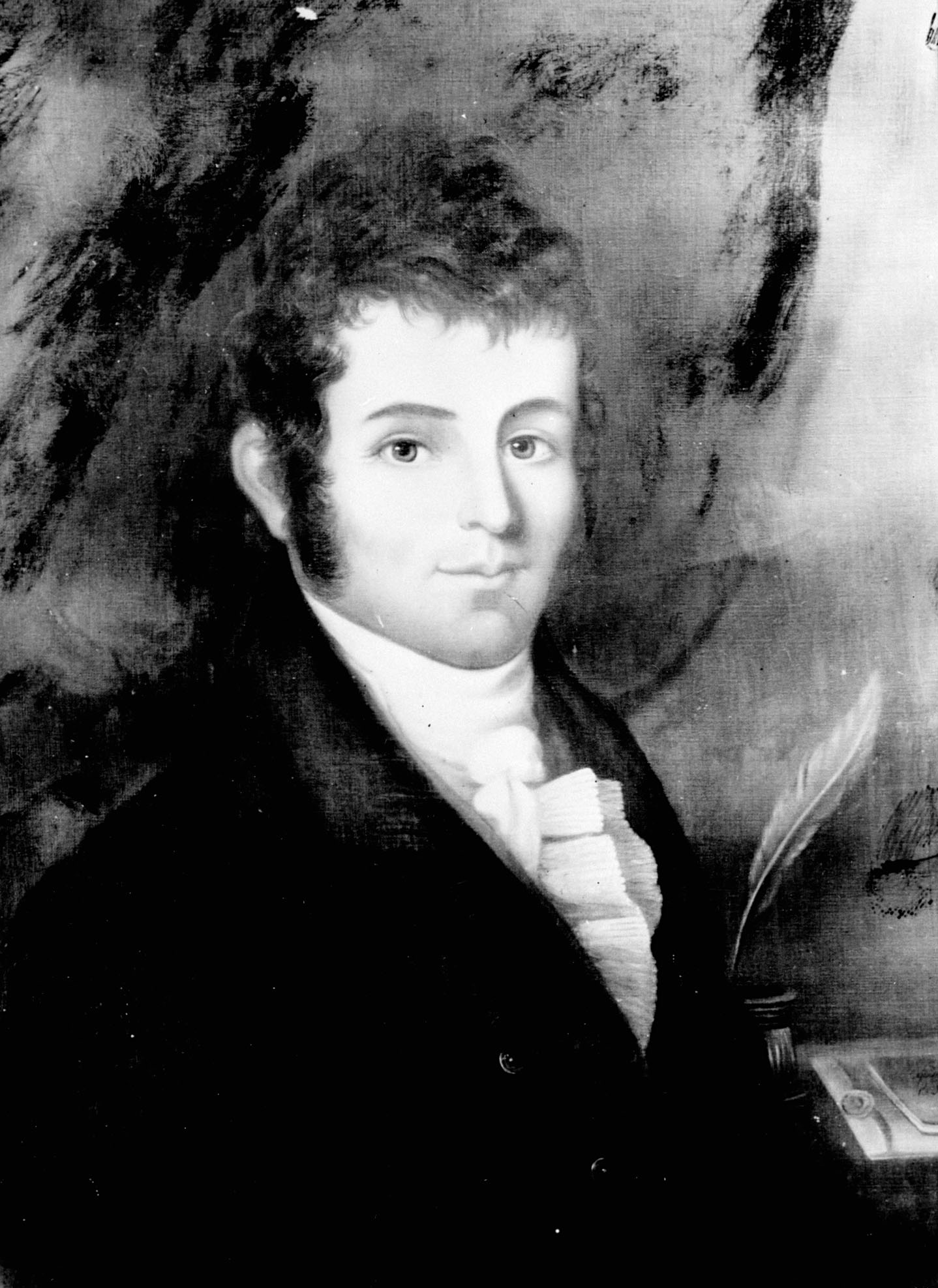

Nominee	William Hawkins	James Mebane
Party	Democratic-Republican	Democratic-Republican
Popular vote	97	62
Percentage	54.80%	35.03%
Governor before election
Benjamin Smith
Democratic-Republican
Elected Governor
William Hawkins
Democratic-Republican

The 1811 North Carolina gubernatorial election was held on December 7, 1811, in order to elect the Governor of North Carolina. Democratic-Republican candidate and former member of the North Carolina House of Representatives William Hawkins was elected by the North Carolina General Assembly against Democratic-Republican candidate James Mebane.

== General election ==
On election day, December 7, 1811, Democratic-Republican candidate William Hawkins was elected by the North Carolina General Assembly by a margin of 35 votes against his opponent Democratic-Republican candidate James Mebane, thereby retaining Democratic-Republican control over the office of Governor. Hawkins was sworn in as the 17th Governor of North Carolina on December 9, 1811.

=== Results ===
North Carolina gubernatorial election, 1811
Party	Candidate	Votes	%
Democratic-Republican	William Hawkins	97	54.80
Democratic-Republican	James Mebane	62	35.03
	Scattering	18	10.17
Total votes		177	100.00
Democratic-Republican hold			
