= 1817 North Carolina gubernatorial election =

- December 3, 1817
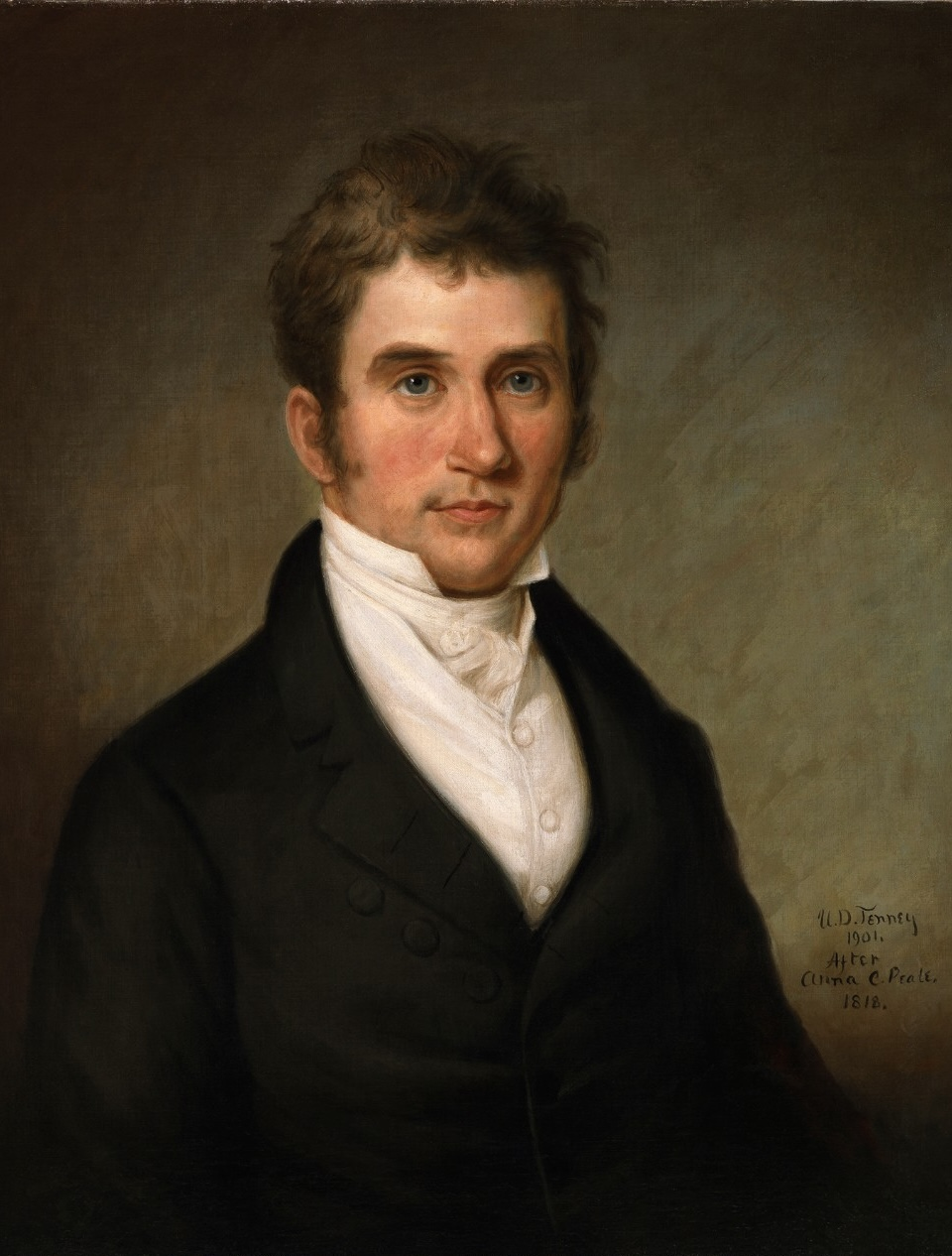

Nominee	John Branch	Duncan Cameron
Party	Democratic-Republican	Federalist
Popular vote	119	60
Percentage	66.48%	33.52%
Governor before election
William Miller
Democratic-Republican
Elected Governor
John Branch
Democratic-Republican

The 1817 North Carolina gubernatorial election was held on December 3, 1817, in order to elect the Governor of North Carolina. Democratic-Republican candidate and former member of the North Carolina Senate John Branch was elected by the North Carolina General Assembly against Federalist candidate and former member of the North Carolina House of Representatives Duncan Cameron.

== General election ==
On election day, December 3, 1817, Democratic-Republican candidate John Branch was elected by the North Carolina General Assembly by a margin of 59 votes against his opponent Federalist candidate Duncan Cameron, thereby retaining Democratic-Republican control over the office of Governor. Branch was sworn in as the 19th Governor of North Carolina on December 6, 1817.

=== Results ===
North Carolina gubernatorial election, 1817
Party	Candidate	Votes	%
Democratic-Republican	John Branch	119	66.48
Federalist	Duncan Cameron	60	33.52
Total votes		179	100.00
Democratic-Republican hold			
