= 1827 North Carolina gubernatorial election =

- December 5, 1827
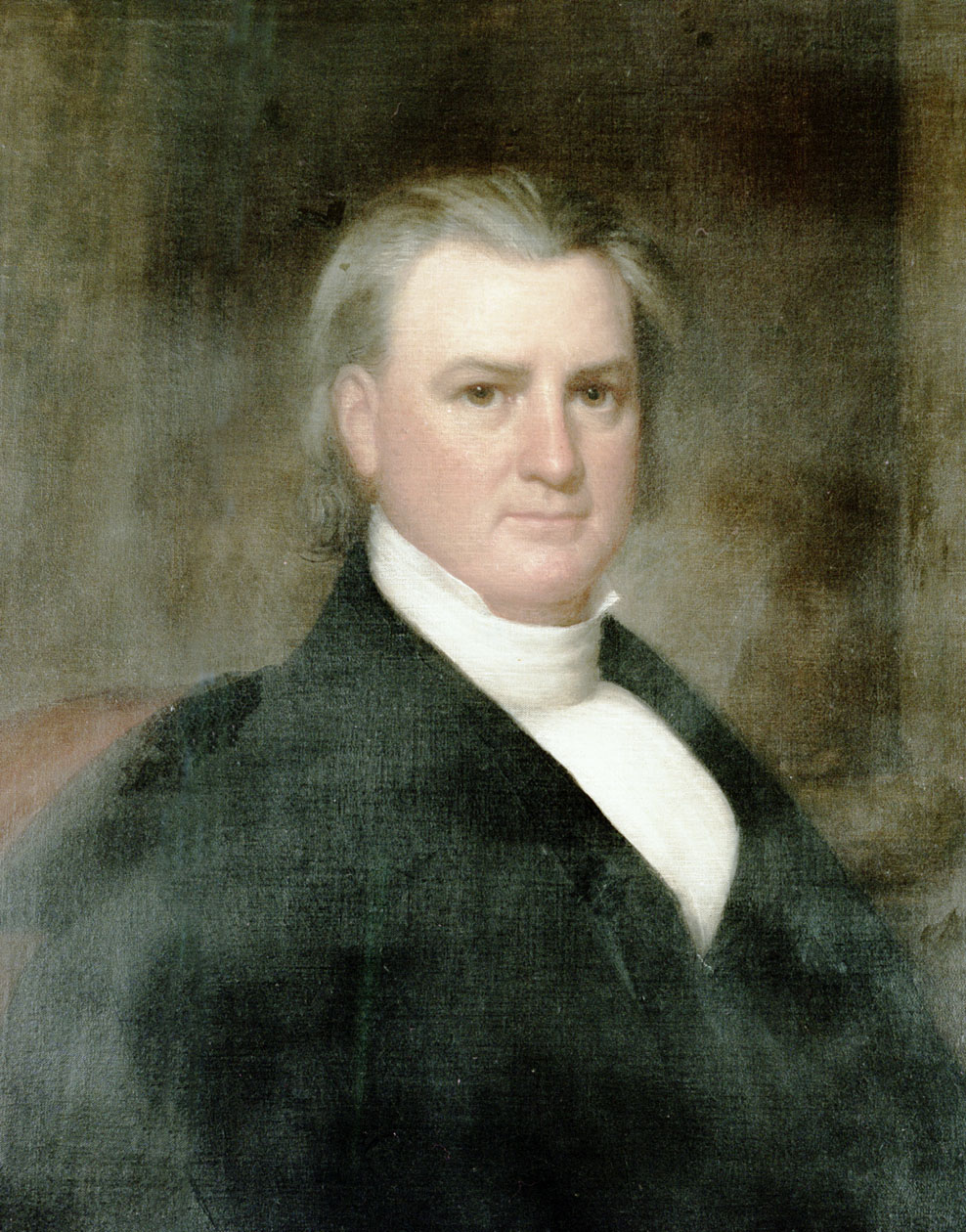

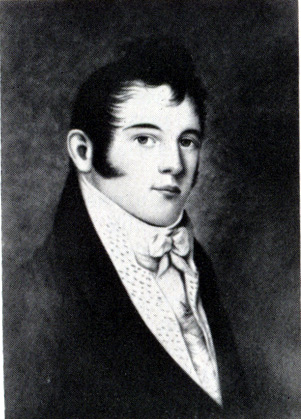
Nominee	James Iredell Jr.	Richard Dobbs Spaight Jr.
Party	Democratic-Republican	Democratic-Republican
Popular vote	104	80
Percentage	56.52%	43.48%
Governor before election
Hutchins Gordon Burton
Democratic-Republican
Elected Governor
James Iredell Jr.
Democratic-Republican

The 1827 North Carolina gubernatorial election was held on December 5, 1827, in order to elect the Governor of North Carolina. Democratic-Republican candidate and former member of the North Carolina House of Representatives James Iredell Jr. was elected by the North Carolina General Assembly against fellow Democratic-Republican candidate and former member of the U.S. House of Representatives from North Carolina's 4th district Richard Dobbs Spaight Jr.

== General election ==
On election day, December 5, 1827, Democratic-Republican candidate James Iredell Jr. was elected by the North Carolina General Assembly by a margin of 24 votes against his opponent fellow Democratic-Republican candidate Richard Dobbs Spaight Jr., thereby retaining Democratic-Republican control over the office of Governor. Iredell was sworn in as the 23rd Governor of North Carolina on December 8, 1827.

=== Results ===
North Carolina gubernatorial election, 1827
Party	Candidate	Votes	%
Democratic-Republican	James Iredell Jr.	104	56.52
Democratic-Republican	Richard Dobbs Spaight Jr.	80	43.48
Total votes		184	100.00
Democratic-Republican hold			
