= 1836 North Carolina gubernatorial election =

- August 4, 1836
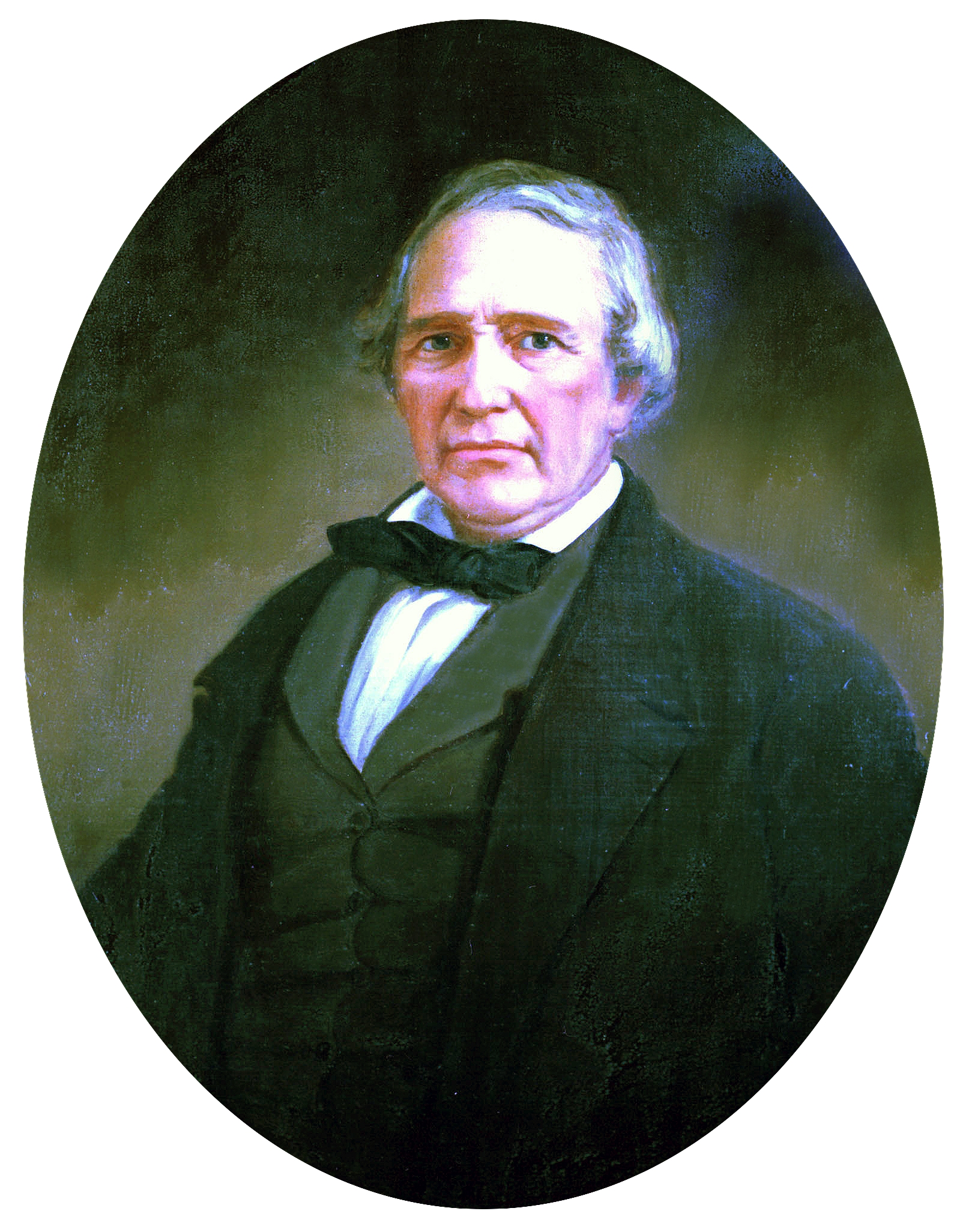

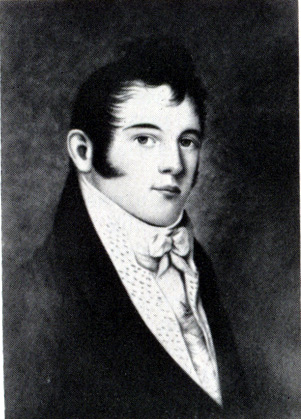
Nominee	Edward Bishop Dudley	Richard Dobbs Spaight Jr.
Party	Whig	Democratic
Popular vote	35,791	31,018
Percentage	53.57%	46.42%
- County results Dudley: 50–60% 60–70% 70–80% 80–90% >90% Spaight: 50–60% 60–70% 70–80% 80–90% >90%
Governor before election
Richard Dobbs Spaight Jr.
Democratic
Elected Governor
Edward Bishop Dudley
Whig

The 1836 North Carolina gubernatorial election was held on August 4, 1836, in order to elect the Governor of North Carolina in the first election decided by popular election instead of the North Carolina General Assembly. Whig nominee and former member of the U.S. House of Representatives from North Carolina's 5th district Edward Bishop Dudley defeated Democratic nominee and incumbent Governor Richard Dobbs Spaight Jr.

== General election ==
On election day, August 4, 1836, Whig nominee Edward Bishop Dudley won the election by a margin of 4,773 votes against his opponent Democratic nominee Richard Dobbs Spaight Jr., thereby gaining Whig control over the office of Governor. Dudley was sworn in as the 28th Governor of North Carolina on December 31, 1836.

=== Results ===
North Carolina gubernatorial election, 1836
Party	Candidate	Votes	%
Whig	Edward Bishop Dudley	35,791	53.57
Democratic	Richard Dobbs Spaight Jr. (incumbent)	31,018	46.42
	Scattering	9	0.01
Total votes		66,818	100.00
Whig gain from Democratic			
