= 1846 North Carolina gubernatorial election =

- August 6, 1846
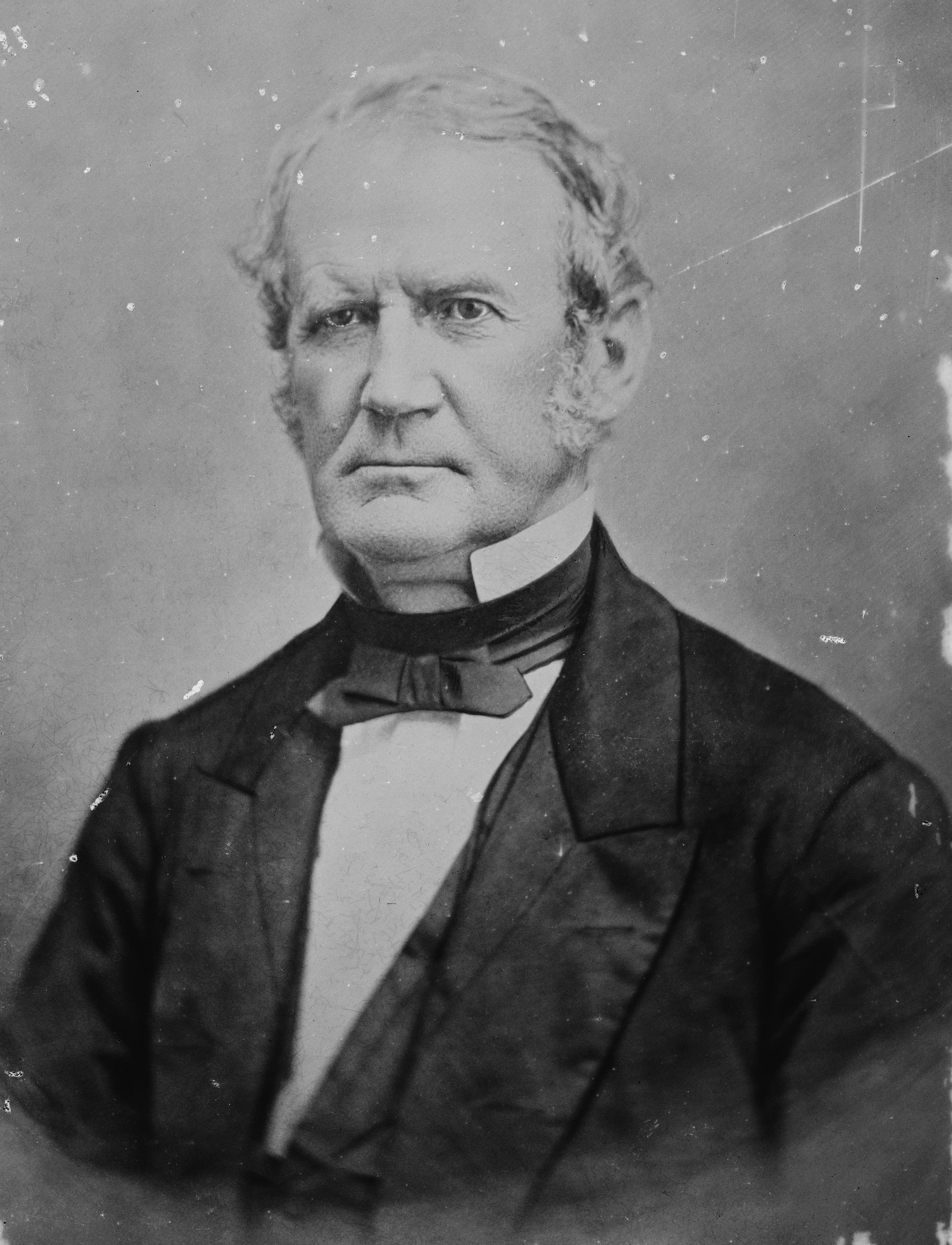

Nominee	William Alexander Graham	James B. Shepard
Party	Whig	Democratic
Popular vote	43,486	35,627
Percentage	54.97%	45.03%
- County results Graham: 50–60% 60–70% 70–80% 80–90% 90–100% Shepard: 50–60% 60–70% 70–80% 80–90% 90–100% No Data/Vote
Governor before election
William Alexander Graham
Whig
Elected Governor
William Alexander Graham
Whig

The 1846 North Carolina gubernatorial election was held on August 6, 1846, in order to elect the governor of North Carolina. Incumbent Whig governor William Alexander Graham won re-election against Democratic nominee James B. Shepard.

== General election ==
On election day, August 6, 1846, incumbent Whig governor William Alexander Graham won re-election by a margin of 7,859 votes against his opponent Democratic nominee James B. Shepard, thereby retaining Whig control over the office of governor. Graham was sworn in for his second term on January 1, 1847.

=== Results ===
North Carolina gubernatorial election, 1846
Party	Candidate	Votes	%
Whig	William Alexander Graham (incumbent)	43,486	54.97
Democratic	James B. Shepard	35,627	45.03
Total votes		79,113	100.00
Whig hold			
