= 1789 North Carolina gubernatorial special election =

- December 5, 1789
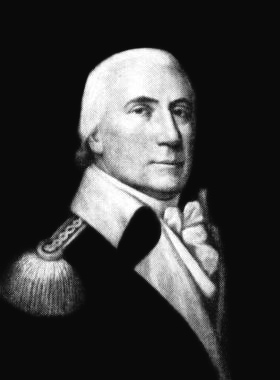
Nominee	Alexander Martin
Party	Federalist
Popular vote	1
Percentage	100.00%
Governor before election
Samuel Johnston
Federalist
Elected Governor
Alexander Martin
Federalist

The 1789 North Carolina gubernatorial special election was held on December 5, 1789, in order to elect the Governor of North Carolina following the resignation of Federalist Governor Samuel Johnston after having been elected to the U.S. Senate. Former Federalist Governor Alexander Martin was elected by the North Carolina General Assembly as he ran unopposed. The exact number of votes cast in this election is unknown.

== General election ==
On election day, December 5, 1789, former Federalist Governor Alexander Martin was elected by the North Carolina General Assembly, thereby retaining Federalist control over the office of Governor. Martin was sworn in for his fourth overall term on December 17, 1789.

=== Results ===
North Carolina gubernatorial special election, 1789
Party	Candidate	Votes	%
Federalist	Alexander Martin	1	100.00
Total votes		1	100.00
Federalist hold			
