= 1789 North Carolina gubernatorial election =

- November 1789
Nominee	Samuel Johnston
Party	Federalist
Popular vote	1
Percentage	100.00%
Governor before election
Samuel Johnston
Federalist
Elected Governor
Samuel Johnston
Federalist

The 1789 North Carolina gubernatorial election was held in November 1789 in order to elect the Governor of North Carolina. Incumbent Federalist Governor Samuel Johnston was re-elected by the North Carolina General Assembly as he ran unopposed. The exact number of votes cast in this election is unknown.

== General election ==
On election day in November 1789, incumbent Federalist Governor Samuel Johnston was re-elected by the North Carolina General Assembly, thereby retaining Federalist control over the office of Governor. Johnston was sworn in for his third term on November 18, 1789.

=== Results ===
North Carolina gubernatorial election, 1789
Party	Candidate	Votes	%
Federalist	Samuel Johnston (incumbent)	1	100.00
Total votes		1	100.00
Federalist hold			
