= 1795 North Carolina gubernatorial election =

- November 1795
Nominee	Samuel Ashe
Party	Democratic-Republican
Popular vote	1
Percentage	100.00%
Governor before election
Richard Dobbs Spaight
Federalist
Elected Governor
Samuel Ashe
Democratic-Republican

The 1795 North Carolina gubernatorial election was held in November 1795 in order to elect the Governor of North Carolina. Democratic-Republican candidate and former judge of the North Carolina Superior Court Samuel Ashe was elected by the North Carolina General Assembly as he ran unopposed. The exact number of votes cast in this election is unknown.

== General election ==
On election day in November 1795, Democratic-Republican candidate Samuel Ashe was elected by the North Carolina General Assembly, thereby gaining Democratic-Republican control over the office of Governor. Ashe was sworn in as the 9th Governor of North Carolina on November 19, 1795.

=== Results ===
North Carolina gubernatorial election, 1795
Party	Candidate	Votes	%
Democratic-Republican	Samuel Ashe	1	100.00
Total votes		1	100.00
Democratic-Republican gain from Federalist			
