= 1815 North Carolina gubernatorial election =

- December 1815
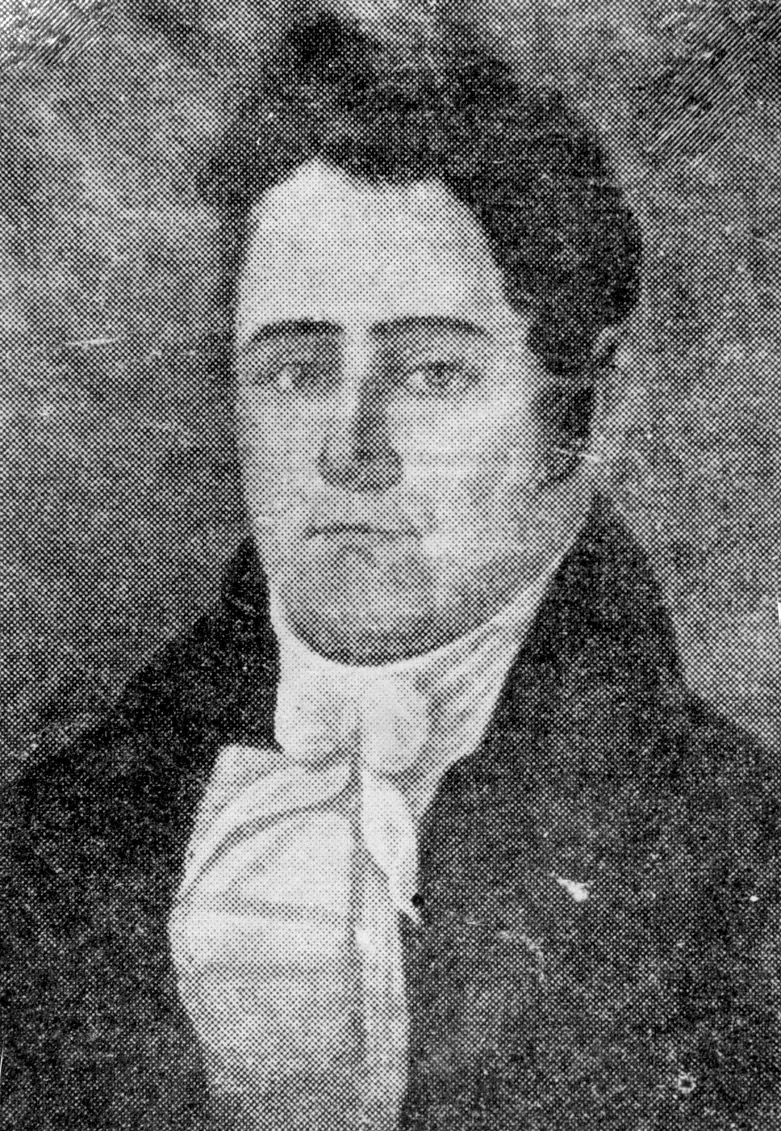
Nominee	William Miller
Party	Democratic-Republican
Popular vote	100
Percentage	100.00%
Governor before election
William Miller
Democratic-Republican
Elected Governor
William Miller
Democratic-Republican

The 1815 North Carolina gubernatorial election was held in December 1815 in order to elect the governor of North Carolina. Incumbent Democratic-Republican governor William Miller was re-elected by the North Carolina General Assembly as he ran unopposed.

== General election ==
On election day in December 1815, incumbent Democratic-Republican governor William Miller was re-elected by the North Carolina General Assembly, thereby retaining Democratic-Republican control over the office of governor. Miller was sworn in for his second term on December 7, 1815.

=== Results ===
North Carolina gubernatorial election, 1815
Party	Candidate	Votes	%
Democratic-Republican	William Miller (incumbent)	100	100.00
Total votes		100	100.00
Democratic-Republican hold			
