= 1809 North Carolina gubernatorial election =

- November 30, 1809
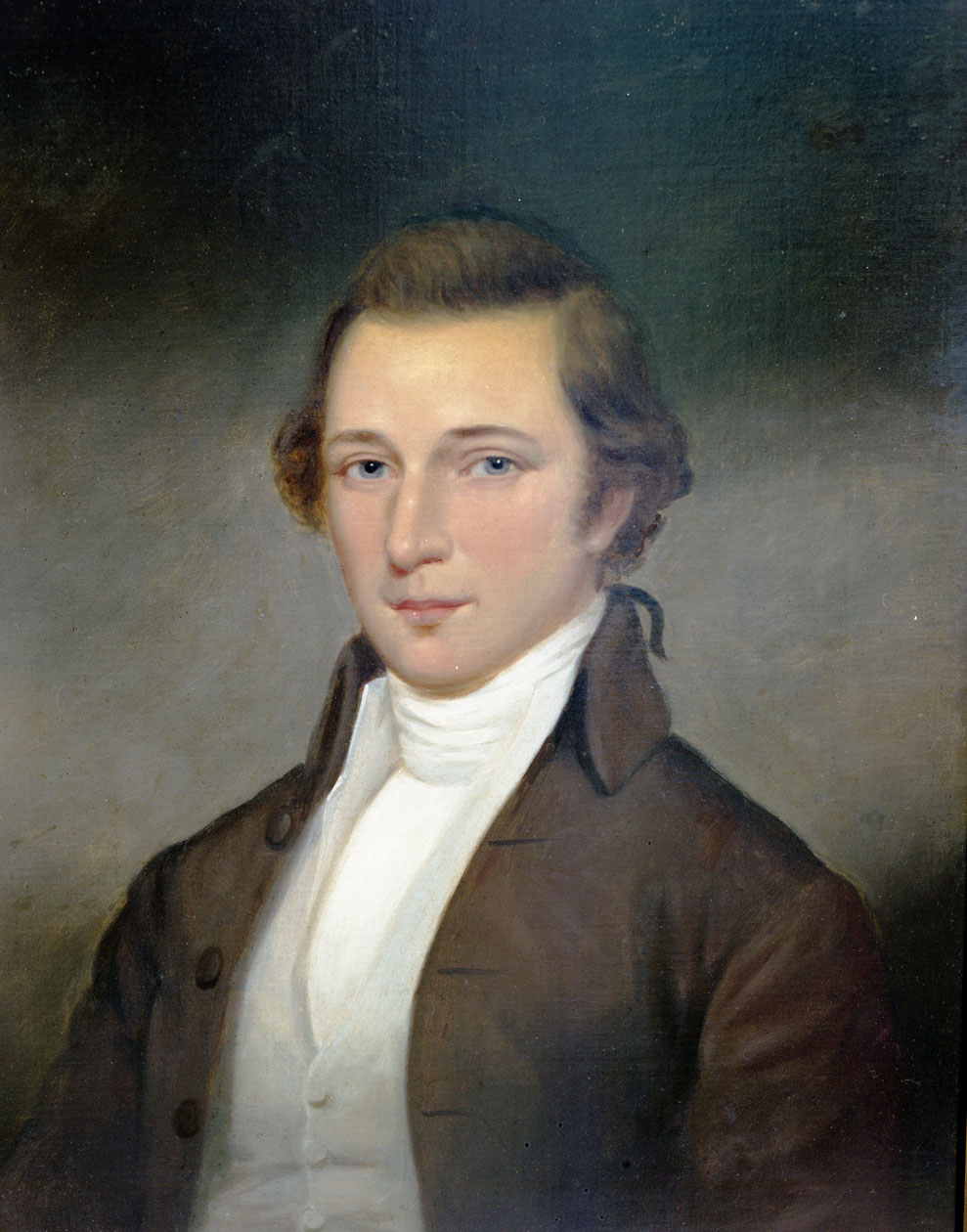
| Nominee | David Stone |
| Party | Democratic-Republican |
| Popular vote | 1 |
| Percentage | 100.00% |
Governor before election
David Stone
Democratic-Republican
Elected Governor
David Stone
Democratic-Republican

The 1809 North Carolina gubernatorial election was held on November 30, 1809, in order to elect the governor of North Carolina. Incumbent Democratic-Republican governor David Stone was re-elected by the North Carolina General Assembly as he ran unopposed. The exact number of votes cast in this election is unknown.

== General election ==
On election day, November 30, 1809, incumbent Democratic-Republican governor David Stone was re-elected by the North Carolina General Assembly, thereby retaining Democratic-Republican control over the office of governor. Stone was sworn in for his second term on December 13, 1809.

=== Results ===
North Carolina gubernatorial election, 1809
| Party | Candidate | Votes | % |
|---|---|---|---|
| Democratic-Republican | David Stone (incumbent) | 1 | 100.00 |
| Total votes | | 1 | 100.00 |
| Democratic-Republican hold | | | |
