= 1835 North Carolina gubernatorial election =

- November 23, 1835
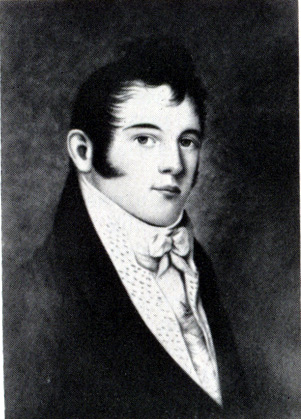

Nominee	Richard Dobbs Spaight Jr.	William B. Meares
Party	Democratic	Whig
Popular vote	103	86
Percentage	53.09%	44.33%
Governor before election
David L. Swain
Whig
Elected Governor
Richard Dobbs Spaight Jr.
Democratic

The 1835 North Carolina gubernatorial election was held on November 23, 1835, in order to elect the Governor of North Carolina. Democratic candidate and former member of the U.S. House of Representatives from North Carolina's 4th district Richard Dobbs Spaight Jr. was elected by the North Carolina General Assembly against Whig candidate and former member of the North Carolina Senate William B. Meares, Democratic candidate and incumbent member of the North Carolina Senate William Dunn Moseley and Whig candidate and former member of the North Carolina Senate Joseph M. Carson.

== General election ==
On election day, November 23, 1835, Democratic candidate Richard Dobbs Spaight Jr. was elected by the North Carolina General Assembly by a margin of 17 votes against his foremost opponent Whig candidate William B. Meares, thereby gaining Democratic control over the office of Governor. Spaight was sworn in as the 27th Governor of North Carolina on December 10, 1835.

=== Results ===
North Carolina gubernatorial election, 1835
Party	Candidate	Votes	%
Democratic	Richard Dobbs Spaight Jr.	103	53.09
Whig	William B. Meares	86	44.33
Democratic	William Dunn Moseley	4	2.06
Whig	Joseph M. Carson	1	0.52
Total votes		194	100.00
Democratic gain from Whig			
