= 1798 North Carolina gubernatorial election =

- November 1798
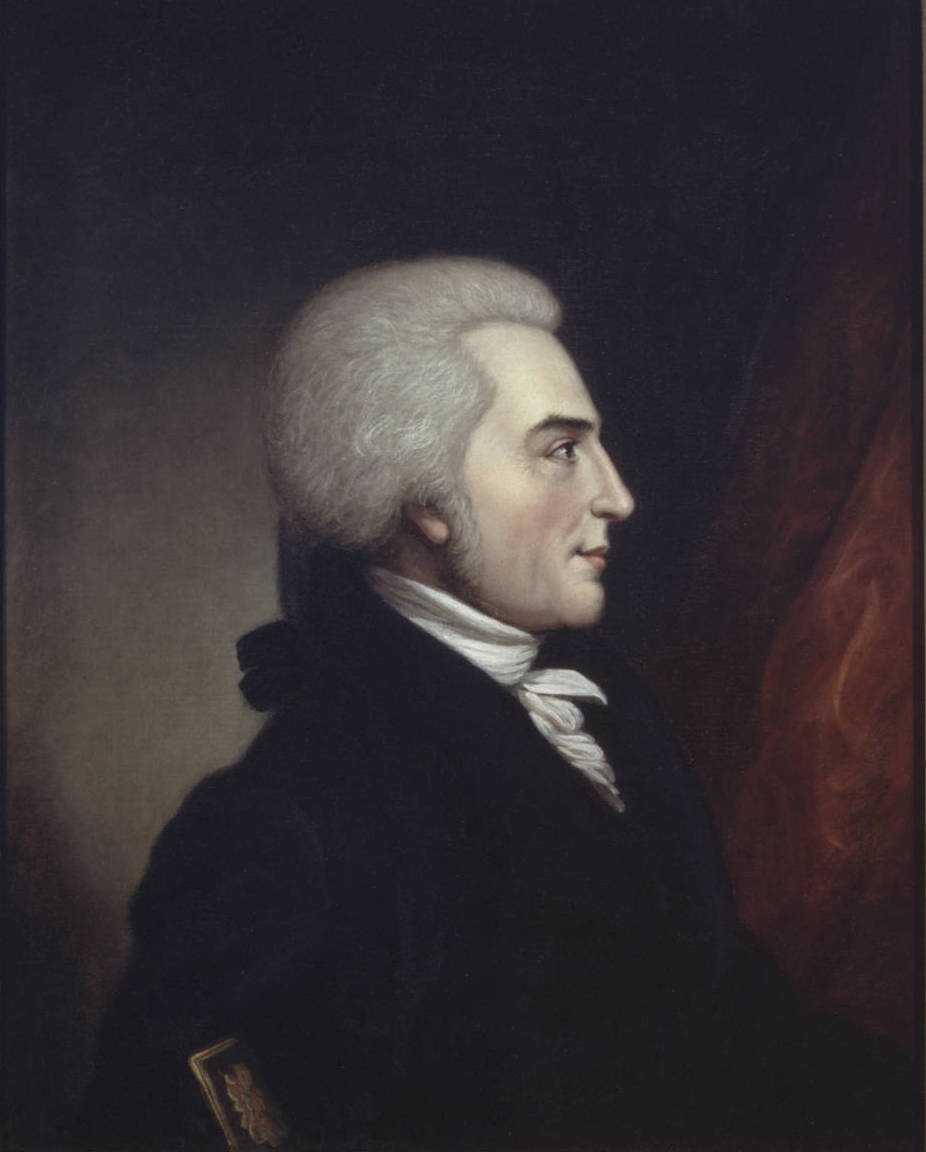
Nominee	William Richardson Davie
Party	Federalist
Popular vote	1
Percentage	100.00%
Governor before election
Samuel Ashe
Democratic-Republican
Elected Governor
William Richardson Davie
Federalist

The 1798 North Carolina gubernatorial election was held in November 1798 in order to elect the Governor of North Carolina. Federalist candidate William Richardson Davie was elected by the North Carolina General Assembly as he ran unopposed. The exact number of votes cast in this election is unknown.

== General election ==
On election day in November 1798, Federalist candidate William Richardson Davie was elected by the North Carolina General Assembly, thereby gaining Federalist control over the office of Governor. Davie was sworn in as the 10th Governor of North Carolina on December 7, 1798.

=== Results ===
North Carolina gubernatorial election, 1798
Party	Candidate	Votes	%
Federalist	William Richardson Davie	1	100.00
Total votes		1	100.00
Federalist gain from Democratic-Republican			
