= 1790 North Carolina gubernatorial election =

- November 17, 1790
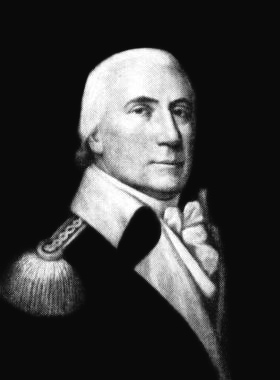
Nominee	Alexander Martin
Party	Federalist
Popular vote	151
Percentage	98.69%
Governor before election
Alexander Martin
Federalist
Elected Governor
Alexander Martin
Federalist

The 1790 North Carolina gubernatorial election was held on November 17, 1790, in order to elect the Governor of North Carolina. Incumbent Federalist Governor Alexander Martin was re-elected by the North Carolina General Assembly against former Federalist member of the North Carolina Senate Charles Johnson.

== General election ==
On election day, November 17, 1790, incumbent Federalist Governor Alexander Martin was re-elected by the North Carolina General Assembly by a margin of 149 votes against his opponent Federalist candidate Charles Johnson, thereby retaining Federalist control over the office of Governor. Martin was sworn in for his fifth overall term on December 9, 1790.

=== Results ===
North Carolina gubernatorial election, 1790
Party	Candidate	Votes	%
Federalist	Alexander Martin (incumbent)	151	98.69
Federalist	Charles Johnson	2	1.31
Total votes		153	100.00
Federalist hold			
