= 1786 North Carolina gubernatorial election =

- December 1786
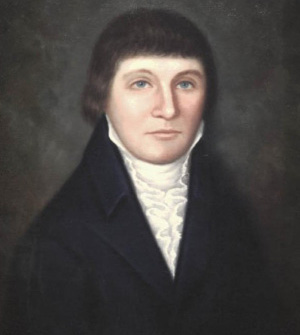
Nominee	Richard Caswell
Party	Nonpartisan
Popular vote	1
Percentage	100.00%
Governor before election
Richard Caswell
Nonpartisan
Elected Governor
Richard Caswell
Nonpartisan

The 1786 North Carolina gubernatorial election was held in December 1786 in order to elect the Governor of North Carolina. Incumbent Governor Richard Caswell was re-elected by the North Carolina General Assembly as he ran unopposed. The exact number of votes cast in this election is unknown.

== General election ==
On election day in December 1786, incumbent Governor Richard Caswell was re-elected by the North Carolina General Assembly. Caswell was sworn in for his fifth overall term on December 23, 1786.

=== Results ===
North Carolina gubernatorial election, 1786
Party	Candidate	Votes	%
Nonpartisan	Richard Caswell (incumbent)	1	100.00
Total votes		1	100.00
Nonpartisan hold			
