= 1785 North Carolina gubernatorial election =

- December 1785
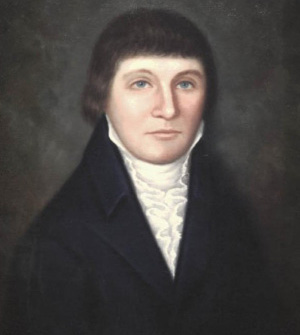
Nominee	Richard Caswell
Party	Nonpartisan
Popular vote	1
Percentage	100.00%
Governor before election
Alexander Martin
Nonpartisan
Elected Governor
Richard Caswell
Nonpartisan

The 1785 North Carolina gubernatorial election was held in December 1785 in order to elect the Governor of North Carolina. Former Governor Richard Caswell was re-elected by the North Carolina General Assembly as he ran unopposed. The exact number of votes cast in this election is unknown.

== General election ==
On election day in December 1785, former Governor Richard Caswell was re-elected by the North Carolina General Assembly. Caswell was sworn in for his fourth overall term on December 12, 1785.

=== Results ===
North Carolina gubernatorial election, 1785
Party	Candidate	Votes	%
Nonpartisan	Richard Caswell	1	100.00
Total votes		1	100.00
Nonpartisan hold			
