= 1813 North Carolina gubernatorial election =

- November 20, 1813
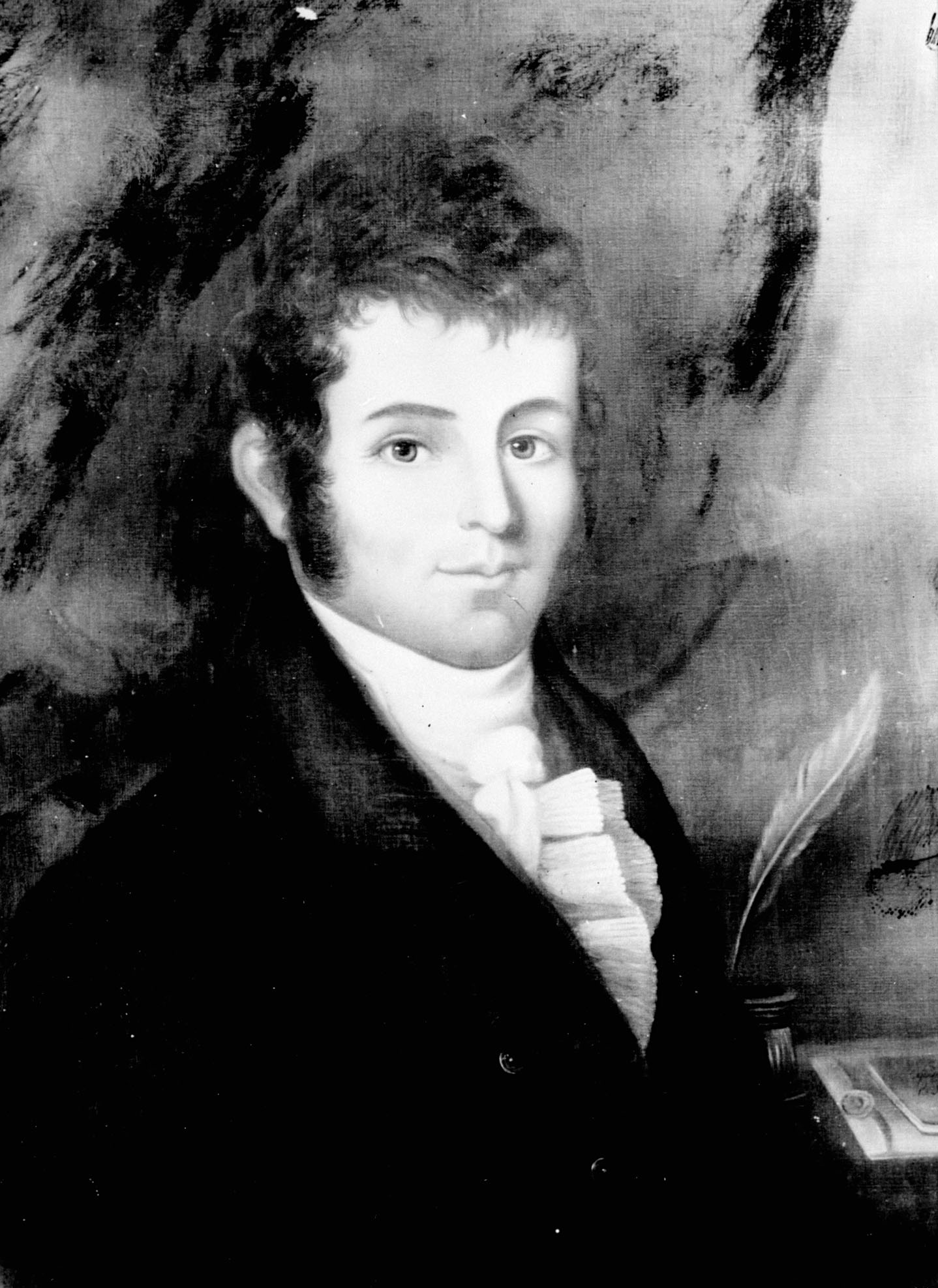
Nominee	William Hawkins
Party	Democratic-Republican
Popular vote	100
Percentage	100.00%
Governor before election
William Hawkins
Democratic-Republican
Elected Governor
William Hawkins
Democratic-Republican

The 1813 North Carolina gubernatorial election was held on November 20, 1813, in order to elect the governor of North Carolina. Incumbent Democratic-Republican governor William Hawkins was re-elected by the North Carolina General Assembly as he ran unopposed.

== General election ==
On election day, November 20, 1813, incumbent Democratic-Republican governor William Hawkins was re-elected by the North Carolina General Assembly, thereby retaining Democratic-Republican control over the office of governor. Hawkins was sworn in for his third term on December 7, 1813.

=== Results ===
North Carolina gubernatorial election, 1813
Party	Candidate	Votes	%
Democratic-Republican	William Hawkins (incumbent)	100	100.00
Total votes		100	100.00
Democratic-Republican hold			
