= 1793 North Carolina gubernatorial election =

- December 1793
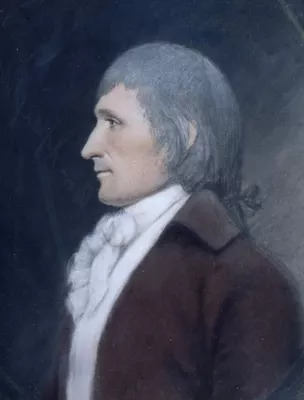
Nominee	Richard Dobbs Spaight
Party	Federalist
Popular vote	1
Percentage	100.00%
Governor before election
Richard Dobbs Spaight
Federalist
Elected Governor
Richard Dobbs Spaight
Federalist

The 1793 North Carolina gubernatorial election was held in December 1793 in order to elect the Governor of North Carolina. Incumbent Federalist Governor Richard Dobbs Spaight was re-elected by the North Carolina General Assembly as he ran unopposed. The exact number of votes cast in this election is unknown.

== General election ==
On election day in December 1793, incumbent Federalist Governor Richard Dobbs Spaight was re-elected by the North Carolina General Assembly, thereby retaining Federalist control over the office of Governor. Spaight was sworn in for his second term on December 26, 1793.

=== Results ===
North Carolina gubernatorial election, 1793
Party	Candidate	Votes	%
Federalist	Richard Dobbs Spaight (incumbent)	1	100.00
Total votes		1	100.00
Federalist hold			
