= 1834 North Carolina gubernatorial election =

- November 24, 1834
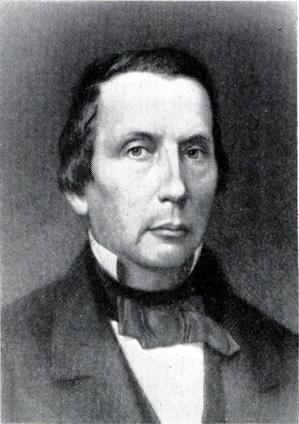

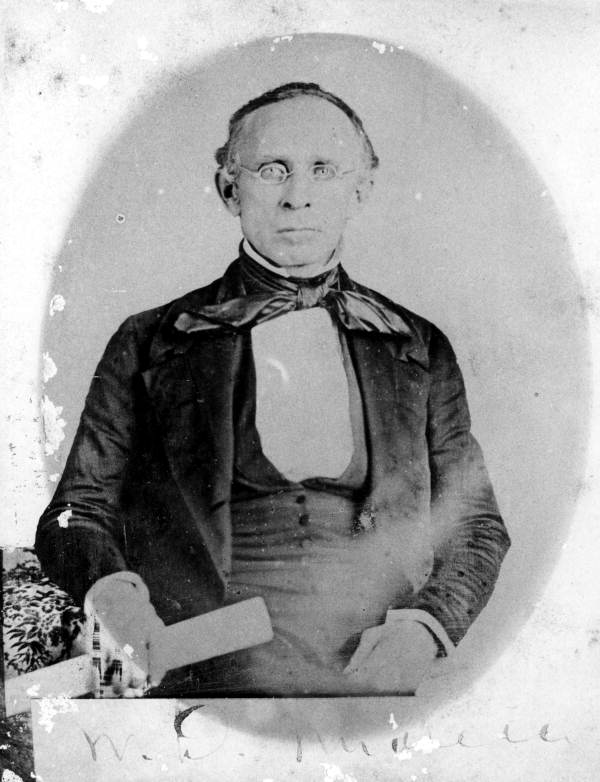
Nominee	David L. Swain	William Dunn Moseley
Party	Whig	Democratic
Popular vote	97	89
Percentage	51.05%	46.84%
Governor before election
David L. Swain
Whig
Elected Governor
David L. Swain
Whig

The 1834 North Carolina gubernatorial election was held on November 24, 1834, in order to elect the governor of North Carolina. Incumbent Whig governor David L. Swain was re-elected by the North Carolina General Assembly against Democratic candidate and incumbent member of the North Carolina Senate William Dunn Moseley.

== General election ==
On election day, November 24, 1834, incumbent Whig governor David L. Swain was re-elected by the North Carolina General Assembly by a margin of 8 votes against his opponent Democratic nominee William Dunn Moseley, thereby retaining Whig control over the office of governor. Swain was sworn in for his third term on December 10, 1834.

=== Results ===
North Carolina gubernatorial election, 1834
Party	Candidate	Votes	%
Whig	David L. Swain (incumbent)	97	51.05
Democratic	William Dunn Moseley	89	46.84
	Scattering	4	2.11
Total votes		190	100.00
Whig hold			
