= 1823 North Carolina gubernatorial election =

- December 1, 1823
Nominee	Gabriel Holmes
Party	Democratic-Republican
Popular vote	1
Percentage	100.00%
Governor before election
Gabriel Holmes
Democratic-Republican
Elected Governor
Gabriel Holmes
Democratic-Republican

The 1823 North Carolina gubernatorial election was held on December 1, 1823, in order to elect the governor of North Carolina. Incumbent Democratic-Republican governor Gabriel Holmes was re-elected by the North Carolina General Assembly as he ran unopposed. The exact number of votes cast in this election is unknown.

== General election ==
On election day, December 1, 1823, incumbent Democratic-Republican governor Gabriel Holmes was re-elected by the North Carolina General Assembly, thereby retaining Democratic-Republican control over the office of governor. Holmes was sworn in for his third term on December 6, 1823.

=== Results ===
North Carolina gubernatorial election, 1823
Party	Candidate	Votes	%
Democratic-Republican	Gabriel Holmes (incumbent)	1	100.00
Total votes		1	100.00
Democratic-Republican hold			
