= 1816 North Carolina gubernatorial election =

- November 23, 1816
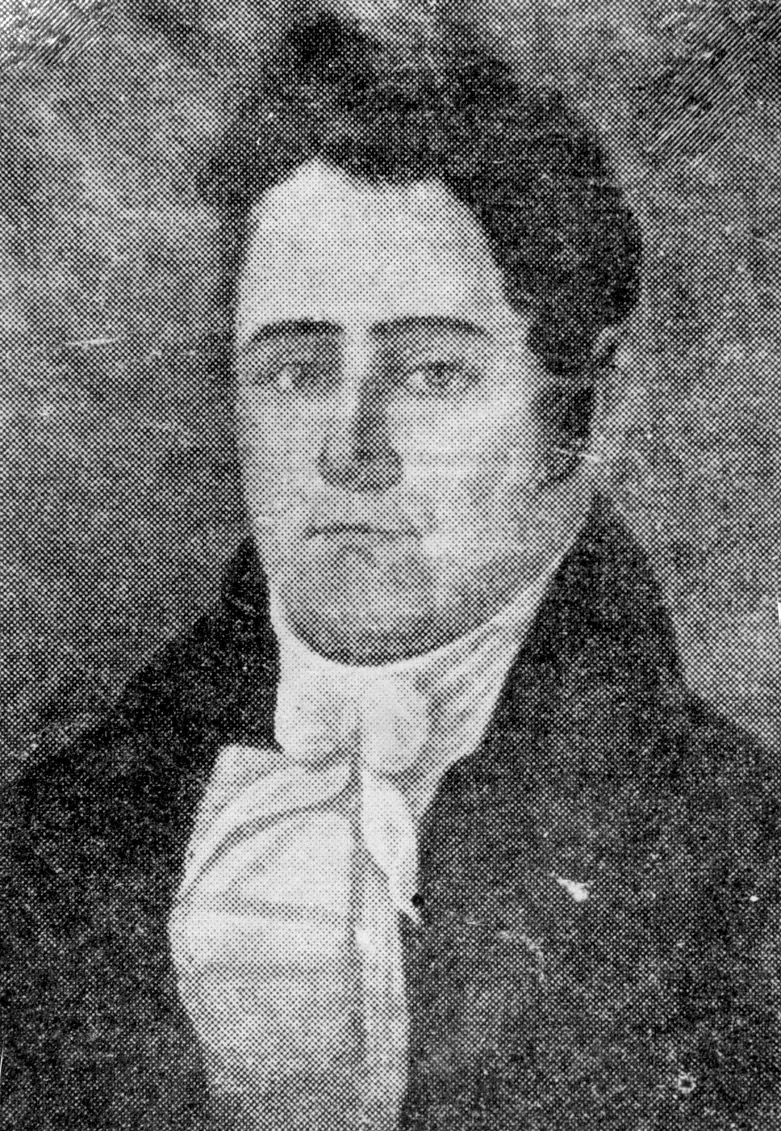
Nominee	William Miller
Party	Democratic-Republican
Popular vote	1
Percentage	100.00%
Governor before election
William Miller
Democratic-Republican
Elected Governor
William Miller
Democratic-Republican

The 1816 North Carolina gubernatorial election was held on November 23, 1816, in order to elect the governor of North Carolina. Incumbent Democratic-Republican governor William Miller was re-elected by the North Carolina General Assembly as he ran unopposed. The exact number of votes cast in this election is unknown.

== General election ==
On election day, November 23, 1816, incumbent Democratic-Republican governor William Miller was re-elected by the North Carolina General Assembly, thereby retaining Democratic-Republican control over the office of governor. Miller was sworn in for his third term on December 7, 1816.

=== Results ===
North Carolina gubernatorial election, 1816
Party	Candidate	Votes	%
Democratic-Republican	William Miller (incumbent)	1	100.00
Total votes		1	100.00
Democratic-Republican hold			
