= 1825 North Carolina gubernatorial election =

- November 30, 1825
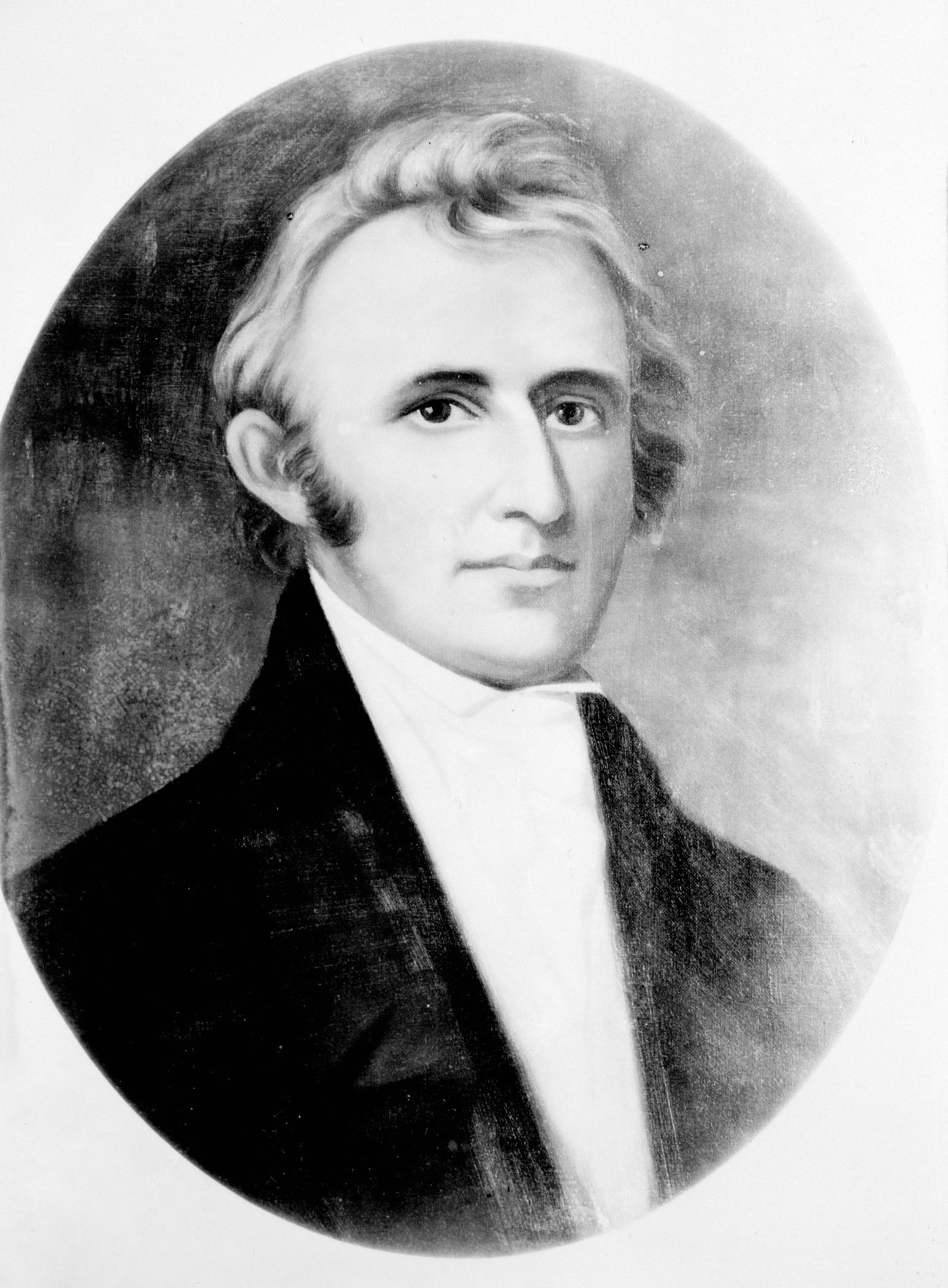
Nominee	Hutchins Gordon Burton
Party	Democratic-Republican
Popular vote	100
Percentage	100.00%
Governor before election
Hutchins Gordon Burton
Democratic-Republican
Elected Governor
Hutchins Gordon Burton
Democratic-Republican

The 1825 North Carolina gubernatorial election was held on November 30, 1825, in order to elect the governor of North Carolina. Incumbent Democratic-Republican governor Hutchins Gordon Burton was re-elected by the North Carolina General Assembly as he ran unopposed.

== General election ==
On election day, November 30, 1825, incumbent Democratic-Republican governor Hutchins Gordon Burton was re-elected by the North Carolina General Assembly, thereby retaining Democratic-Republican control over the office of governor. Burton was sworn in for his second term on December 6, 1825.

=== Results ===
North Carolina gubernatorial election, 1825
Party	Candidate	Votes	%
Democratic-Republican	Hutchins Gordon Burton (incumbent)	100	100.00
Total votes		100	100.00
Democratic-Republican hold			
