= 1844 North Carolina gubernatorial election =

- August 1, 1844
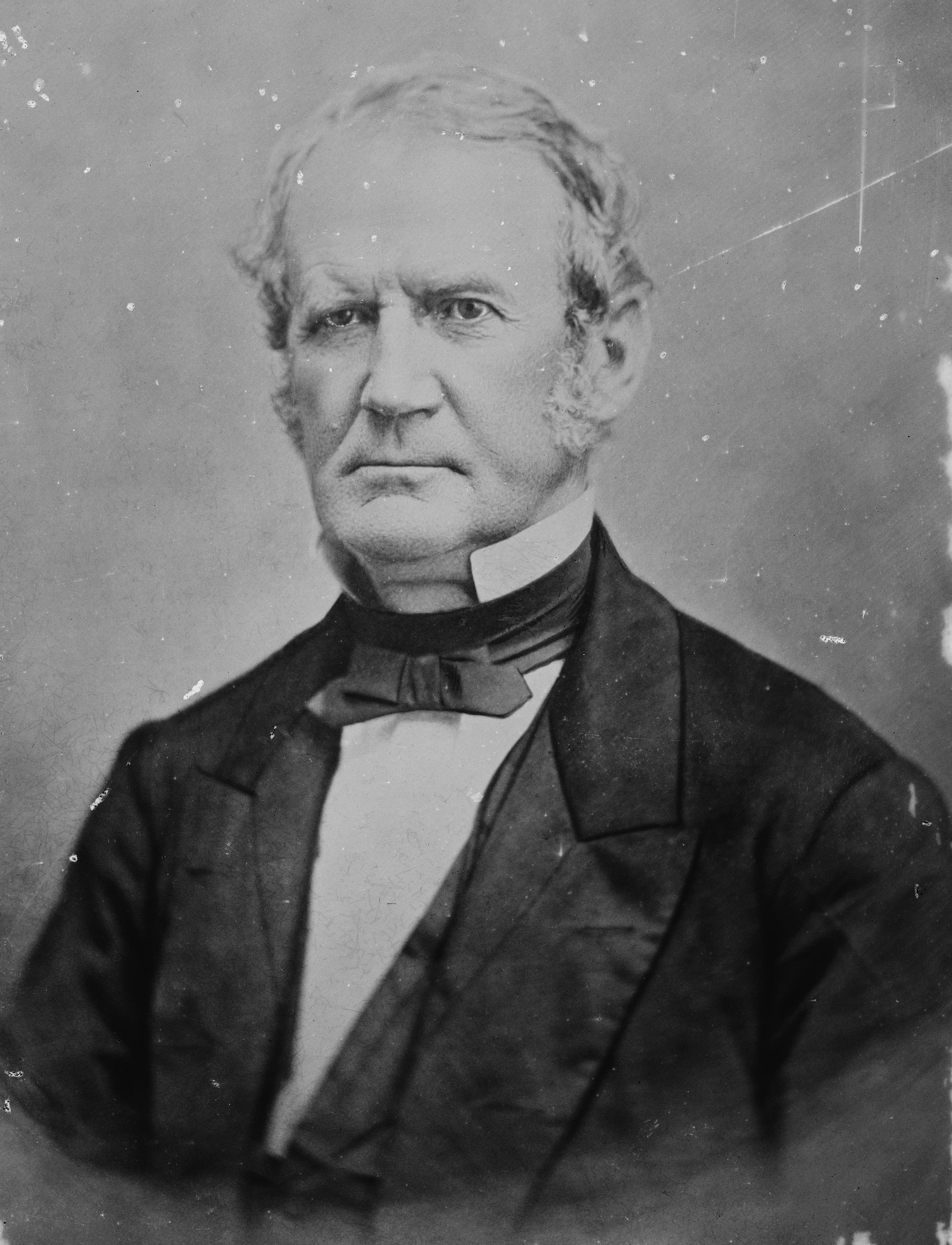

Nominee	William Alexander Graham	Michael Hoke
Party	Whig	Democratic
Popular vote	42,586	39,433
Percentage	51.92%	48.08%
- County results Graham: 50–60% 60–70% 70–80% 80–90% Hoke: 50–60% 60–70% 70–80% 80–90% 90–100% No Data/Vote
Governor before election
John Motley Morehead
Whig
Elected Governor
William Alexander Graham
Whig

The 1844 North Carolina gubernatorial election was held on August 1, 1844, in order to elect the Governor of North Carolina. Whig nominee and former United States Senator from North Carolina William Alexander Graham defeated Democratic nominee Michael Hoke.

== General election ==
On election day, August 1, 1844, Whig nominee William Alexander Graham won the election by a margin of 3,153 votes against his opponent Democratic nominee Michael Hoke, thereby retaining Whig control over the office of Governor. Graham was sworn in as the 30th Governor of North Carolina on January 1, 1845.

=== Results ===
North Carolina gubernatorial election, 1844
Party	Candidate	Votes	%
Whig	William Alexander Graham	42,586	51.92
Democratic	Michael Hoke	39,433	48.08
Total votes		82,019	100.00
Whig hold			
