= 1842 North Carolina gubernatorial election =

- August 4, 1842
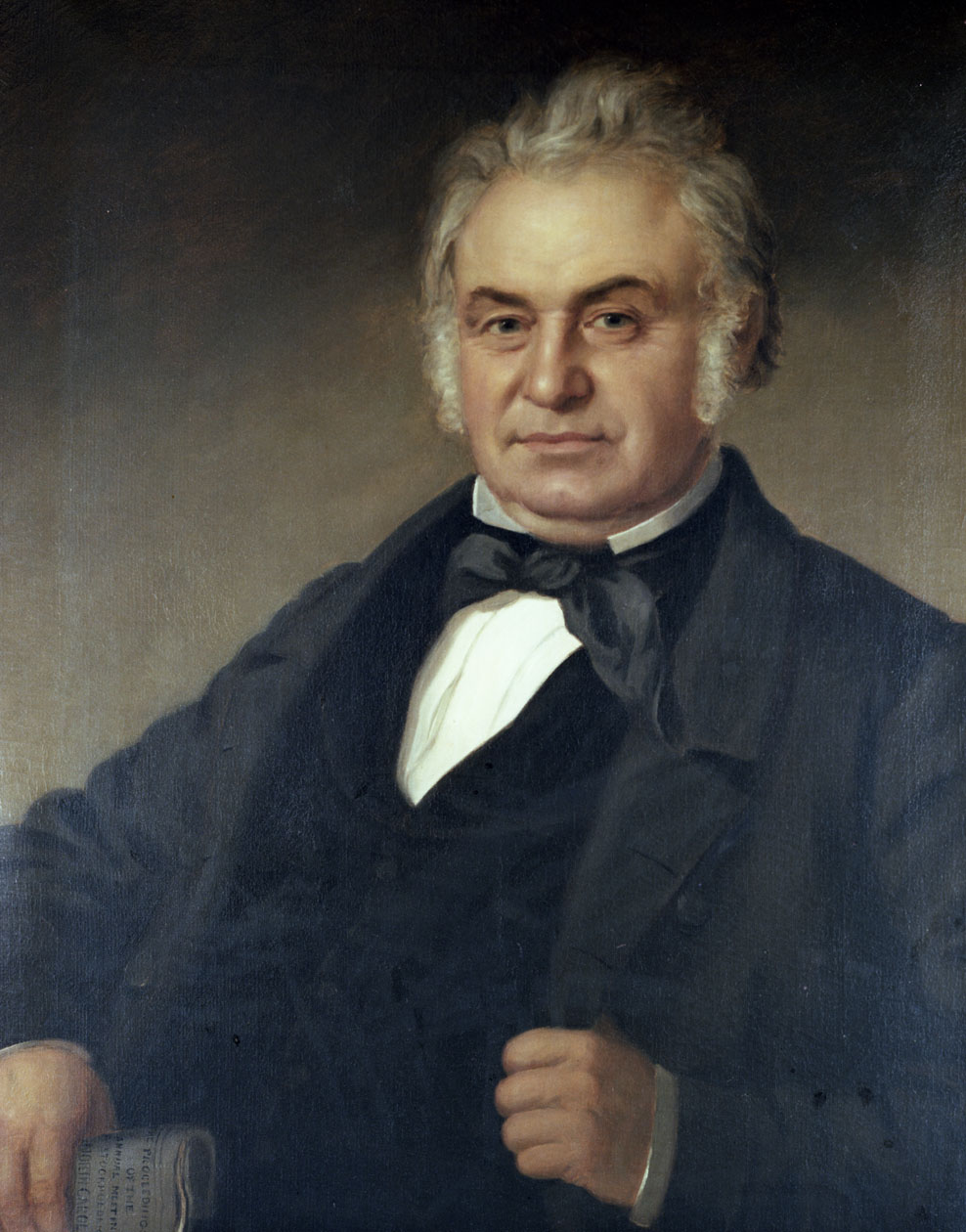

Nominee	John Motley Morehead	Louis D. Henry
Party	Whig	Democratic
Popular vote	39,596	35,024
Percentage	53.06%	46.94%
- County results Morehead: 50–60% 60–70% 70–80% 80–90% 90–100% Henry: 50–60% 60–70% 70–80% 80–90% 90–100% No Data/Vote
Governor before election
John Motley Morehead
Whig
Elected Governor
John Motley Morehead
Whig

The 1842 North Carolina gubernatorial election was held on August 4, 1842, in order to elect the governor of North Carolina. Incumbent Whig governor John Motley Morehead won re-election against Democratic nominee Louis D. Henry.

== General election ==
On election day, August 4, 1842, incumbent Whig governor John Motley Morehead won re-election by a margin of 4,572 votes against his opponent Democratic nominee Louis D. Henry, thereby retaining Whig control over the office of governor. Morehead was sworn in for his second term on December 31, 1842.

=== Results ===
North Carolina gubernatorial election, 1842
Party	Candidate	Votes	%
Whig	John Motley Morehead (incumbent)	39,596	53.06
Democratic	Louis D. Henry	35,024	46.94
Total votes		74,620	100.00
Whig hold			
