= 1852 North Carolina gubernatorial election =

- August 5, 1852
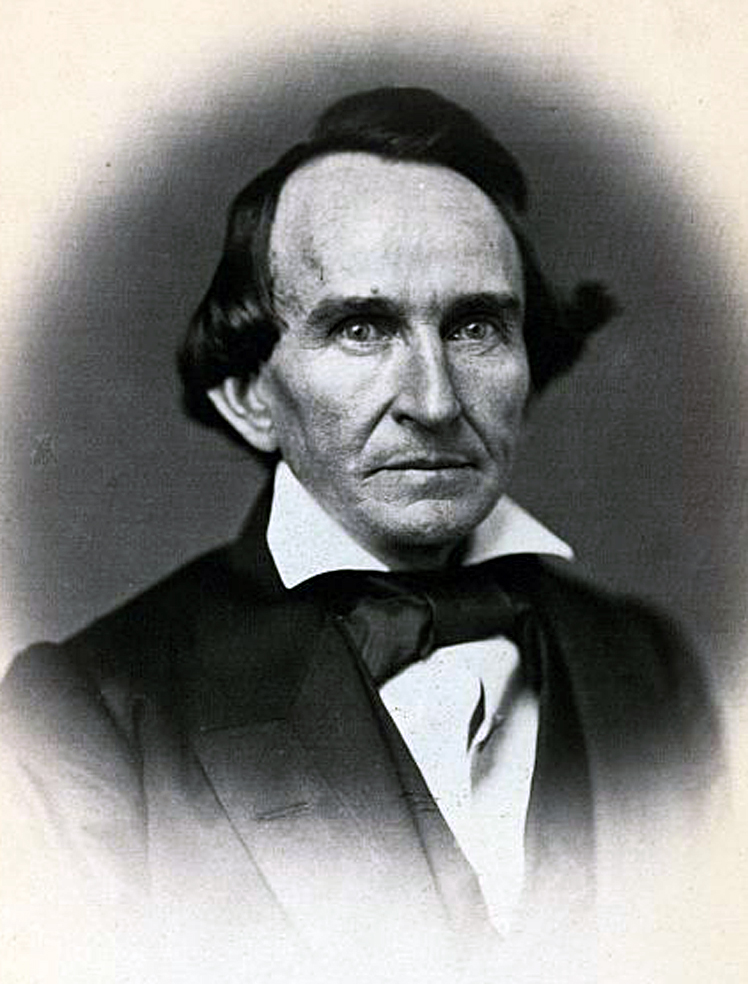

Nominee	David Settle Reid	John Kerr Jr.
Party	Democratic	Whig
Popular vote	48,484	42,993
Percentage	53.00%	47.00%
- County results Reid: 50–60% 60–70% 70–80% 80–90% 90–100% Kerr: 50–60% 60–70% 70–80% 80–90% 90–100% No Data/Vote
Governor before election
David Settle Reid
Democratic
Elected Governor
David Settle Reid
Democratic

The 1852 North Carolina gubernatorial election was held on August 5, 1852, in order to elect the governor of North Carolina. Incumbent Democratic governor David Settle Reid was re-elected against Whig nominee John Kerr Jr.

== General election ==
On election day, August 5, 1852, incumbent Democratic governor David Settle Reid won re-election by a margin of 5,491 votes against his opponent Whig nominee John Kerr Jr., thereby retaining Democratic control over the office of governor. Reid was sworn in for his second term on December 22, 1852.

=== Results ===
North Carolina gubernatorial election, 1852
Party	Candidate	Votes	%
Democratic	David Settle Reid (incumbent)	48,484	53.00
Whig	John Kerr Jr.	42,993	47.00
Total votes		91,477	100.00
Democratic hold			
