= 1833 North Carolina gubernatorial election =

- November 27, 1833
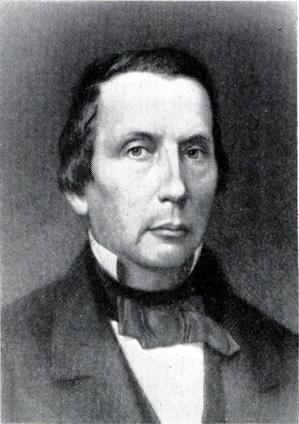
Nominee	David L. Swain
Party	Whig
Popular vote	100
Percentage	100.00%
Governor before election
David L. Swain
Whig
Elected Governor
David L. Swain
Whig

The 1833 North Carolina gubernatorial election was held on November 27, 1833, in order to elect the governor of North Carolina. Incumbent Whig governor David L. Swain was re-elected by the North Carolina General Assembly as he ran unopposed.

== General election ==
On election day, November 27, 1833, incumbent Whig governor David L. Swain was re-elected by the North Carolina General Assembly, thereby retaining Whig control over the office of governor. Swain was sworn in for his second term on December 9, 1833.

=== Results ===
North Carolina gubernatorial election, 1833
Party	Candidate	Votes	%
Whig	David L. Swain (incumbent)	100	100.00
Total votes		100	100.00
Whig hold			
