= 1822 North Carolina gubernatorial election =

- November 26, 1822
Nominee	Gabriel Holmes
Party	Democratic-Republican
Popular vote	100
Percentage	100.00%
Governor before election
Gabriel Holmes
Democratic-Republican
Elected Governor
Gabriel Holmes
Democratic-Republican

The 1822 North Carolina gubernatorial election was held on November 26, 1822, in order to elect the governor of North Carolina. Incumbent Democratic-Republican governor Gabriel Holmes was re-elected by the North Carolina General Assembly as he ran unopposed.

== General election ==
On election day, November 26, 1822, incumbent Democratic-Republican governor Gabriel Holmes was re-elected by the North Carolina General Assembly, thereby retaining Democratic-Republican control over the office of governor. Holmes was sworn in for his second term on December 7, 1822.

=== Results ===
North Carolina gubernatorial election, 1822
Party	Candidate	Votes	%
Democratic-Republican	Gabriel Holmes (incumbent)	100	100.00
Total votes		100	100.00
Democratic-Republican hold			
