= 1829 North Carolina gubernatorial election =

- December 9, 1829
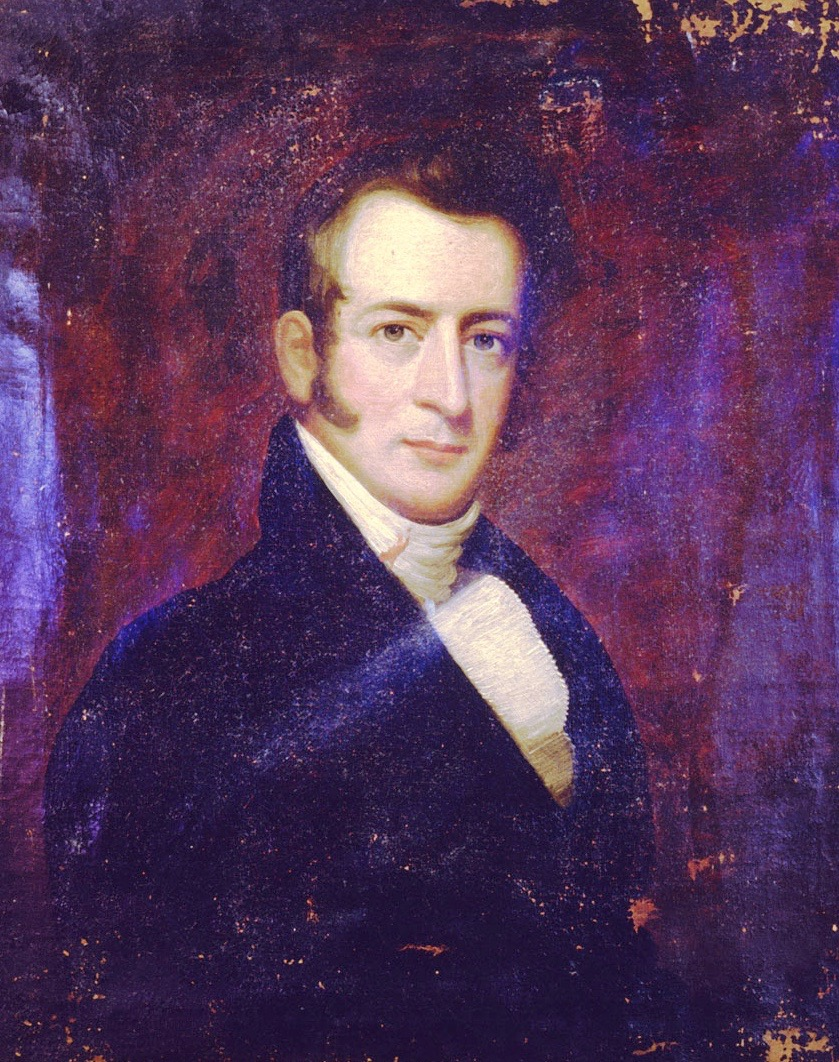
Nominee	John Owen
Party	Democratic-Republican
Popular vote	100
Percentage	100.00%
Governor before election
John Owen
Democratic-Republican
Elected Governor
John Owen
Democratic-Republican

The 1829 North Carolina gubernatorial election was held on December 9, 1829, in order to elect the governor of North Carolina. Incumbent Democratic-Republican governor John Owen was re-elected by the North Carolina General Assembly as he ran unopposed.

== General election ==
On election day, December 9, 1829, incumbent Democratic-Republican governor John Owen was re-elected by the North Carolina General Assembly, thereby retaining Democratic-Republican control over the office of governor. Owen was sworn in for his second term on December 10, 1829.

=== Results ===
North Carolina gubernatorial election, 1829
Party	Candidate	Votes	%
Democratic-Republican	John Owen (incumbent)	100	100.00
Total votes		100	100.00
Democratic-Republican hold			
