= 1838 North Carolina gubernatorial election =

- August 2, 1838
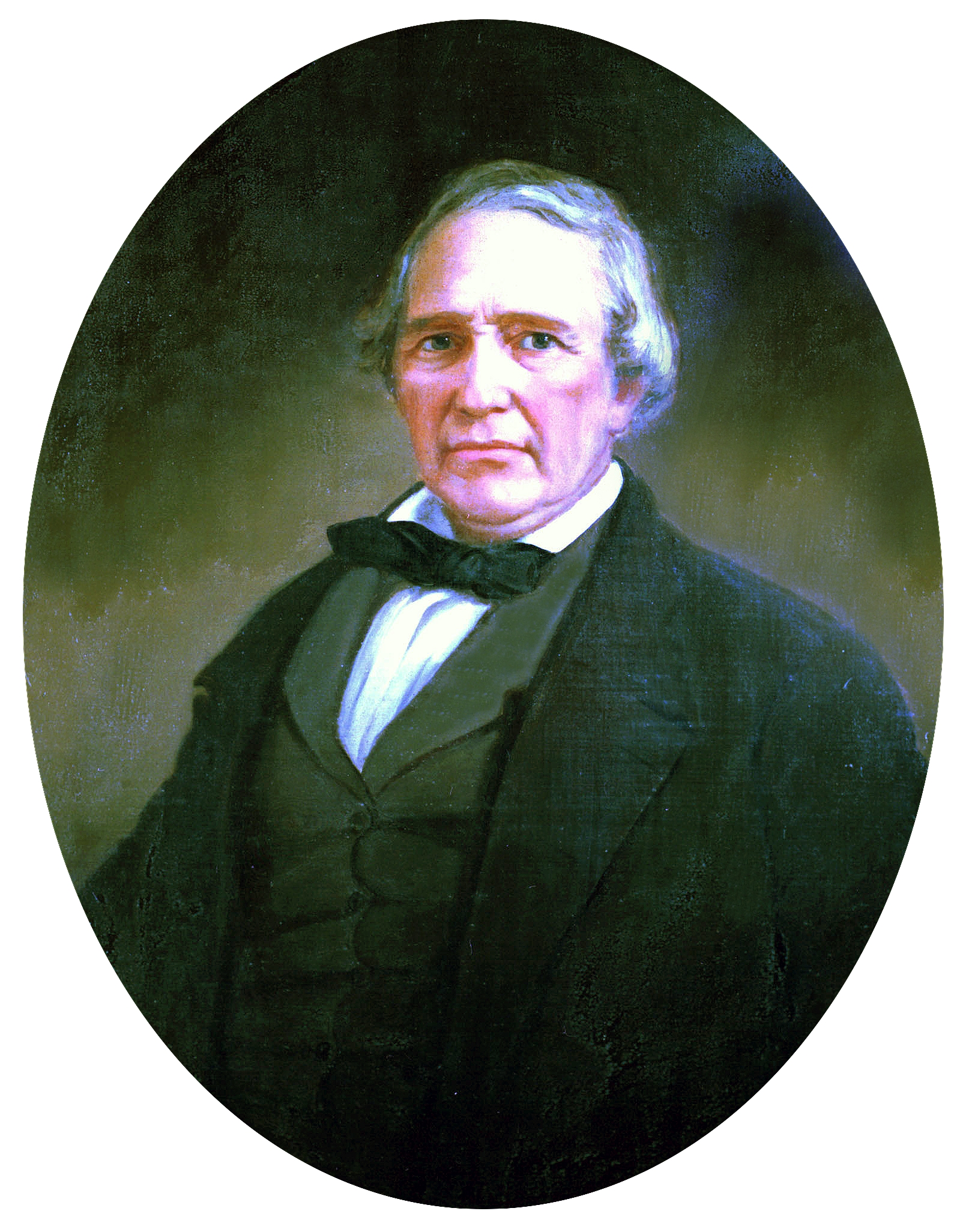

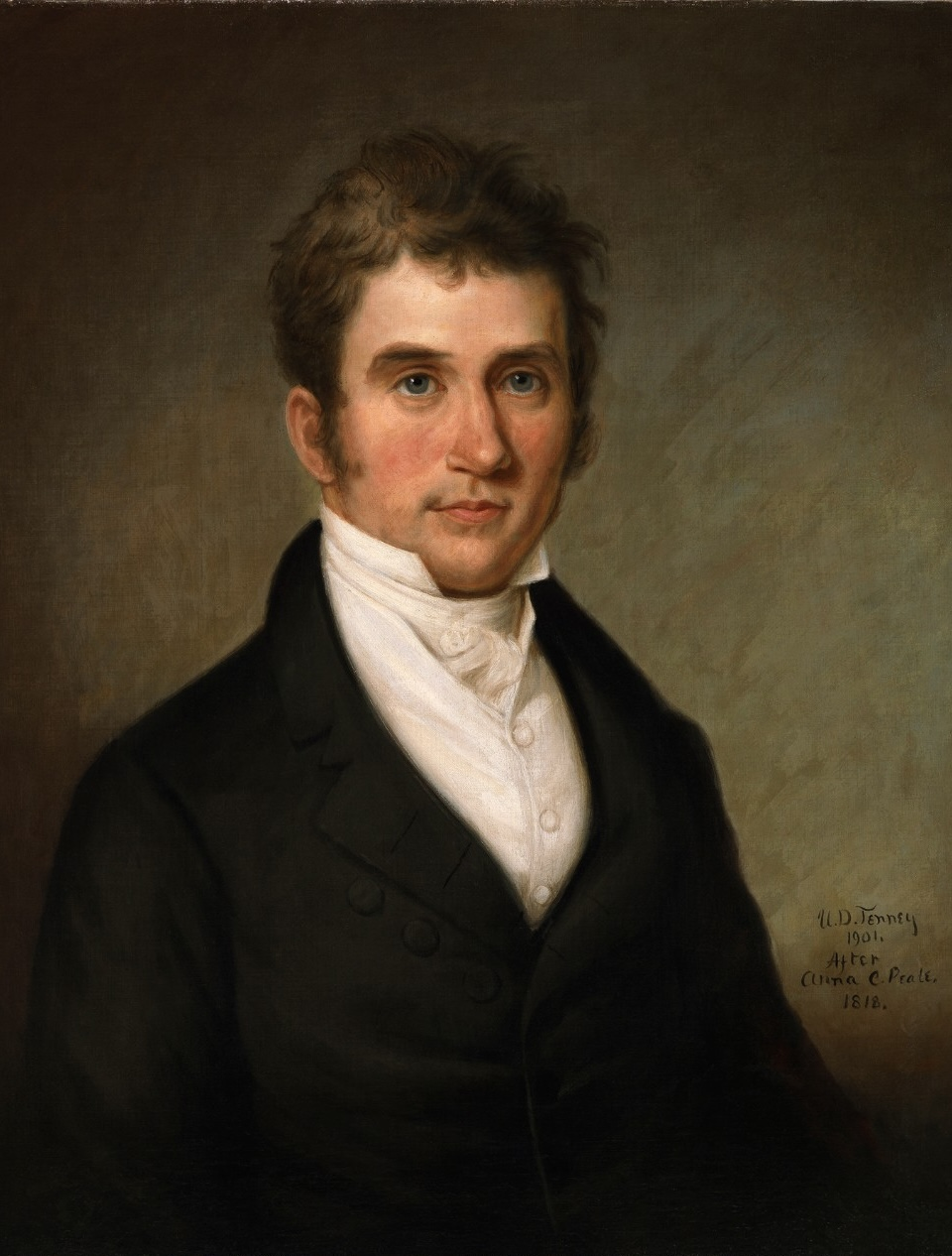
Nominee	Edward Bishop Dudley	John Branch
Party	Whig	Democratic
Popular vote	38,119	21,155
Percentage	64.15%	35.60%
- County results Dudley: 50–60% 60–70% 70–80% 80–90% 90–100% Branch: 50–60% 60–70% 70–80% 80–90% 90–100% No Data/Vote
Governor before election
Edward Bishop Dudley
Whig
Elected Governor
Edward Bishop Dudley
Whig

The 1838 North Carolina gubernatorial election was held on August 2, 1838, in order to elect the Governor of North Carolina. Whig nominee and incumbent Governor Edward Bishop Dudley defeated Democratic nominee and former Governor John Branch.

== General election ==
On election day, August 2, 1838, Whig nominee Edward Bishop Dudley won re-election by a margin of 16,964 votes against his opponent Democratic nominee John Branch, thereby retaining Whig control over the office of Governor. Dudley was sworn in for his second term on December 29, 1838.

=== Results ===
North Carolina gubernatorial election, 1838
Party	Candidate	Votes	%
Whig	Edward Bishop Dudley (incumbent)	38,119	64.15
Democratic	John Branch	21,155	35.60
	Scattering	150	0.25
Total votes		59,424	100.00
Whig hold			
