= 1854 North Carolina gubernatorial election =

- August 3, 1854
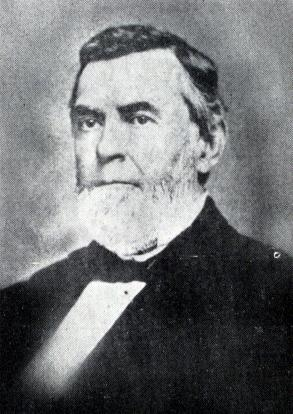

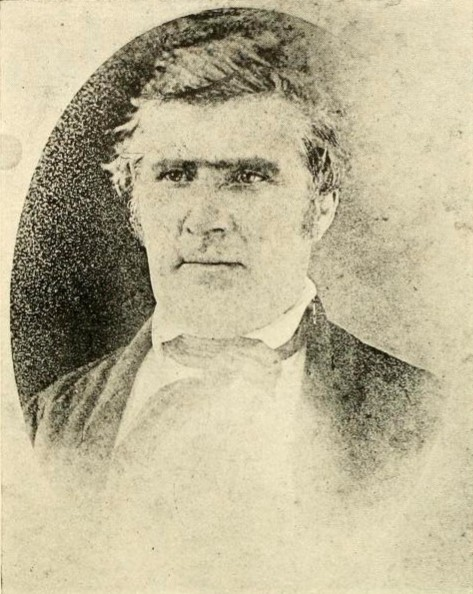
Nominee	Thomas Bragg	Alfred Dockery
Party	Democratic	Whig
Popular vote	48,705	46,644
Percentage	51.08%	48.92%
- County results Bragg: 50–60% 60–70% 70–80% 80–90% 90–100% Dockery: 50–60% 60–70% 70–80% 80–90% 90–100%
Governor before election
Warren Winslow (Acting)
Democratic
Elected Governor
Thomas Bragg
Democratic

The 1854 North Carolina gubernatorial election was held on August 3, 1854, in order to elect the Governor of North Carolina. Democratic nominee and former member of the North Carolina House of Representatives Thomas Bragg defeated Whig nominee and former member of the U.S. House of Representatives from North Carolina's 3rd district Alfred Dockery.

== General election ==
On election day, August 3, 1854, Democratic nominee Thomas Bragg won the election by a margin of 2,061 votes against his opponent Whig nominee Alfred Dockery, thereby retaining Democratic control over the office of Governor. Bragg was sworn in as the 34th Governor of North Carolina on January 1, 1855.

=== Results ===
North Carolina gubernatorial election, 1854
Party	Candidate	Votes	%
Democratic	Thomas Bragg	48,705	51.08
Whig	Alfred Dockery	46,644	48.92
Total votes		95,349	100.00
Democratic hold			
