= 1832 North Carolina gubernatorial election =

- December 1, 1832
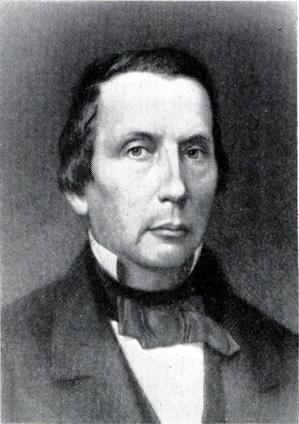

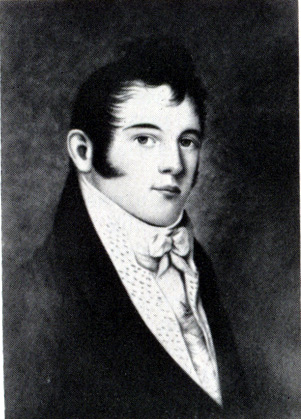
| Nominee | David L. Swain | Richard Dobbs Spaight Jr. |
| Party | Whig | Democratic |
| Popular vote | 99 | 85 |
| Percentage | 51.03% | 43.81% |
Governor before election
Montfort Stokes
Democratic-Republican
Elected Governor
David L. Swain
Whig

The 1832 North Carolina gubernatorial election was held on December 1, 1832, in order to elect the Governor of North Carolina. Whig nominee David L. Swain was elected by the North Carolina General Assembly against Democratic candidate and former member of the U.S. House of Representatives from North Carolina's 4th district Richard Dobbs Spaight Jr. and fellow Democratic candidate and former member of the U.S. House of Representatives from North Carolina's 2nd district Joseph Hunter Bryan.

== General election ==
On election day, December 1, 1832, Whig nominee David L. Swain was elected by the North Carolina General Assembly by a margin of 14 votes against his foremost opponent Democratic nominee Richard Dobbs Spaight Jr., thereby gaining Whig control over the office of Governor. Swain was sworn in as the 26th Governor of North Carolina on December 6, 1832.

=== Results ===
North Carolina gubernatorial election, 1832
| Party | Candidate | Votes | % |
|---|---|---|---|
| Whig | David L. Swain | 99 | 51.03 |
| Democratic | Richard Dobbs Spaight Jr. | 85 | 43.81 |
| | Scattering | 6 | 3.09 |
| Democratic | Joseph Hunter Bryan | 4 | 2.07 |
| Total votes | | 194 | 100.00 |
| Whig gain from Democratic-Republican | | | |
