= 1797 North Carolina gubernatorial election =

- November 1797
Nominee	Samuel Ashe
Party	Democratic-Republican
Popular vote	1
Percentage	100.00%
Governor before election
Samuel Ashe
Democratic-Republican
Elected Governor
Samuel Ashe
Democratic-Republican

The 1797 North Carolina gubernatorial election was held in November 1797 in order to elect the governor of North Carolina. Incumbent Democratic-Republican governor Samuel Ashe was re-elected by the North Carolina General Assembly as he ran unopposed. The exact number of votes cast in this election is unknown.

== General election ==
On election day in November 1797, incumbent Democratic-Republican governor Samuel Ashe was re-elected by the North Carolina General Assembly, thereby retaining Democratic-Republican control over the office of governor. Ashe was sworn in for his third term on December 5, 1797.

=== Results ===
North Carolina gubernatorial election, 1797
Party	Candidate	Votes	%
Democratic-Republican	Samuel Ashe (incumbent)	1	100.00
Total votes		1	100.00
Democratic-Republican hold			
