= 1784 North Carolina gubernatorial election =

- April 1784
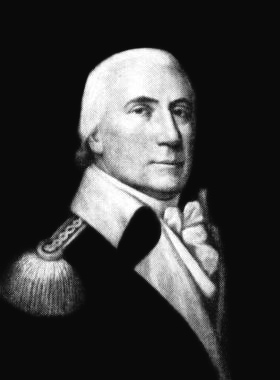
Nominee	Alexander Martin
Party	Nonpartisan
Popular vote	1
Percentage	100.00%
Governor before election
Alexander Martin
Nonpartisan
Elected Governor
Alexander Martin
Nonpartisan

The 1784 North Carolina gubernatorial election was held in April 1784 in order to elect the Governor of North Carolina. Incumbent Governor Alexander Martin was re-elected by the North Carolina General Assembly as he ran unopposed. The exact number of votes cast in this election is unknown.

== General election ==
On election day in April 1784, incumbent Governor Alexander Martin was re-elected by the North Carolina General Assembly. Martin was sworn in for his third term on May 3, 1784.

=== Results ===
North Carolina gubernatorial election, 1784
Party	Candidate	Votes	%
Nonpartisan	Alexander Martin (incumbent)	1	100.00
Total votes		1	100.00
Nonpartisan hold			
