= 1820 North Carolina gubernatorial election =

- December 5, 1820

Nominee	Jesse Franklin	Gabriel Holmes	Joseph Hunter Bryan
Party	Democratic-Republican	Democratic-Republican	Democratic-Republican
Popular vote	94	63	28
Percentage	50.81%	34.05%	15.14%
Governor before election
John Branch
Democratic-Republican
Elected Governor
Jesse Franklin
Democratic-Republican

The 1820 North Carolina gubernatorial election was held on December 5, to elect the next of Governor of North Carolina. Democratic-Republican candidate and former United States Senator from North Carolina Jesse Franklin was elected by the North Carolina General Assembly against Democratic-Republican candidate and former state senator Gabriel Holmes and Democratic-Republican candidate and former United States Representative from North Carolina's 2nd congressional district, Joseph Hunter Bryan.

== General election ==
On election day, December 5, 1820, Democratic-Republican candidate Jesse Franklin was elected by the North Carolina General Assembly by a margin of 31 votes against his foremost opponent fellow Democratic-Republican candidate Gabriel Holmes, thereby retaining Democratic-Republican control over the office of Governor. Franklin was sworn in as the 20th Governor of North Carolina on December 7, 1820.

=== Results ===
North Carolina gubernatorial election, 1820
Party	Candidate	Votes	%
Democratic-Republican	Jesse Franklin	94	50.81
Democratic-Republican	Gabriel Holmes	63	34.05
Democratic-Republican	Joseph Hunter Bryan	28	15.14
Total votes		185	100.00
Democratic-Republican hold			
