= List of governors of Rhode Island =

Governor of Rhode Island
- Seal of the governor

- Flag of the governor

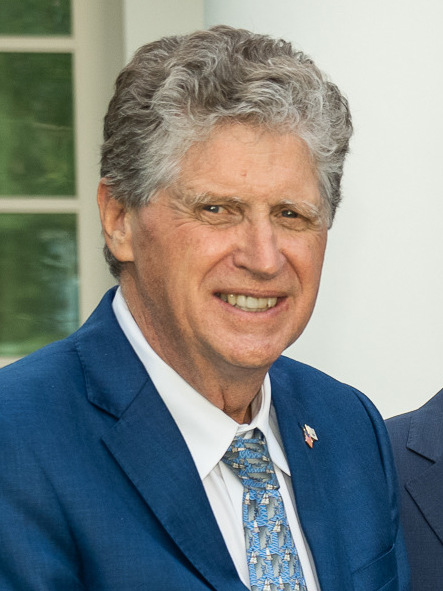
- Incumbent; Dan McKee since March 2, 2021
- Style: Governor (informal); The Honorable (formal)
- Status: Head of state; Head of government
- Term length: Four years, renewable once consecutively
- Inaugural holder: Nicholas Cooke
- Formation: November 7, 1775 (251 years ago)
- Succession: Line of succession
- Deputy: Lieutenant Governor of Rhode Island
- Salary: $145,755 (2022)
- Website: governor.ri.gov

The governor of Rhode Island is the head of government of Rhode Island and serves as commander-in-chief of the U.S. state's Army National Guard and Air National Guard. The current governor is Dan McKee.

== Governors ==
Rhode Island was one of the original Thirteen Colonies and was admitted as a state on May 29, 1790. Before it declared its independence, Rhode Island was a colony of the Kingdom of Great Britain.

The state initially continued operating under the provisions of its 1663 charter, which simply said that the governor and deputy-governor would be elected from time to time. The 1842 constitution formalized the terms for governor and lieutenant governor to be one year, beginning on the first Tuesday of May after the election. Amendment XVI, taking effect in 1911, changed the term to be two years beginning from the first Tuesday in the January after the election. Terms were lengthened to four years in 1992, but governors were now limited to succeeding themselves only once. A former governor can run again after a four-year break. Should the office of governor be vacant, the lieutenant governor becomes governor. The governor and the lieutenant governor are not officially elected on the same ticket.

Governors of the State of Rhode Island
No.	Governor	Term in office	Party	Election	Lt. Governor (Note: Office was named Deputy Governor until 1798.) (Note: Lieutenant governors represented the same party as their governor unless noted.)
1	Nicholas Cooke (1717–1782)	November 7, 1775 (Note: Cooke was deputy governor when colonial governor Joseph Wanton was deposed on November 7, 1775, and was chosen to replace him.) – May 6, 1778 (912 days; retired)	No parties	1776	William Bradford
1	Nicholas Cooke (1717–1782)	November 7, 1775 – May 6, 1778 (912 days; retired)	No parties	1777	William Bradford
2	William Greene Jr. (1731–1809)	May 6, 1778 – May 3, 1786 (2920 days; lost election)	No parties	1778	Jabez Bowen
2	William Greene Jr. (1731–1809)	May 6, 1778 – May 3, 1786 (2920 days; lost election)	No parties	1779	Jabez Bowen
2	William Greene Jr. (1731–1809)	May 6, 1778 – May 3, 1786 (2920 days; lost election)	No parties	1780	William West
2	William Greene Jr. (1731–1809)	May 6, 1778 – May 3, 1786 (2920 days; lost election)	No parties	1781	Jabez Bowen
2	William Greene Jr. (1731–1809)	May 6, 1778 – May 3, 1786 (2920 days; lost election)	No parties	1782	Jabez Bowen
2	William Greene Jr. (1731–1809)	May 6, 1778 – May 3, 1786 (2920 days; lost election)	No parties	1783	Jabez Bowen
2	William Greene Jr. (1731–1809)	May 6, 1778 – May 3, 1786 (2920 days; lost election)	No parties	1784	Jabez Bowen
2	William Greene Jr. (1731–1809)	May 6, 1778 – May 3, 1786 (2920 days; lost election)	No parties	1785	Jabez Bowen
3	John Collins (1717–1795)	May 3, 1786 – May 5, 1790 (1464 days; lost election)	No parties	1786	Daniel Owen
3	John Collins (1717–1795)	May 3, 1786 – May 5, 1790 (1464 days; lost election)	No parties	1787	Daniel Owen
3	John Collins (1717–1795)	May 3, 1786 – May 5, 1790 (1464 days; lost election)	No parties	1788	Daniel Owen
3	John Collins (1717–1795)	May 3, 1786 – May 5, 1790 (1464 days; lost election)	No parties	1789	Daniel Owen
4	Arthur Fenner (1745–1805)	May 5, 1790 – October 15, 1805 (5642 days; died in office)	Country	1790	Samuel J. Potter
4	Arthur Fenner (1745–1805)	May 5, 1790 – October 15, 1805 (5642 days; died in office)	Country	1791	Samuel J. Potter
4	Arthur Fenner (1745–1805)	May 5, 1790 – October 15, 1805 (5642 days; died in office)	Country	1792	Samuel J. Potter
4	Arthur Fenner (1745–1805)	May 5, 1790 – October 15, 1805 (5642 days; died in office)	Country	1793	Samuel J. Potter
4	Arthur Fenner (1745–1805)	May 5, 1790 – October 15, 1805 (5642 days; died in office)	Country	1794	Samuel J. Potter
4	Arthur Fenner (1745–1805)	May 5, 1790 – October 15, 1805 (5642 days; died in office)	Country	1795	Samuel J. Potter
4	Arthur Fenner (1745–1805)	May 5, 1790 – October 15, 1805 (5642 days; died in office)	Country	1796	Samuel J. Potter
4	Arthur Fenner (1745–1805)	May 5, 1790 – October 15, 1805 (5642 days; died in office)	Country	1797	Samuel J. Potter
4	Arthur Fenner (1745–1805)	May 5, 1790 – October 15, 1805 (5642 days; died in office)	Country	1798	Samuel J. Potter
4	Arthur Fenner (1745–1805)	May 5, 1790 – October 15, 1805 (5642 days; died in office)	Country	1799	George Brown
4	Arthur Fenner (1745–1805)	May 5, 1790 – October 15, 1805 (5642 days; died in office)	Country	1800	Samuel J. Potter
4	Arthur Fenner (1745–1805)	May 5, 1790 – October 15, 1805 (5642 days; died in office)	Country	1801	Samuel J. Potter
4	Arthur Fenner (1745–1805)	May 5, 1790 – October 15, 1805 (5642 days; died in office)	Country	1802	Samuel J. Potter
4	Arthur Fenner (1745–1805)	May 5, 1790 – October 15, 1805 (5642 days; died in office)	Country	1803	Paul Mumford (died July 20, 1805)
4	Arthur Fenner (1745–1805)	May 5, 1790 – October 15, 1805 (5642 days; died in office)	Country	1804	Paul Mumford (died July 20, 1805)
4	Arthur Fenner (1745–1805)	May 5, 1790 – October 15, 1805 (5642 days; died in office)	Country	1805	Paul Mumford (died July 20, 1805)
4	Arthur Fenner (1745–1805)	May 5, 1790 – October 15, 1805 (5642 days; died in office)	Country	1805	Vacant
5	Henry Smith (1766–1818)	October 15, 1805 – May 7, 1806 (205 days; lost election)	Democratic- Republican	Succeeded from president of the Senate (Note: As the office of lieutenant governor was vacant, President of the Senate Smith succeeded to governor.)	Vacant
6	Isaac Wilbour (1763–1837)	May 7, 1806 – May 6, 1807 (365 days; retired) (Note: Wilbour was instead elected to the United States House of Representatives.)	Democratic- Republican	1806 (Note: No candidate received a majority of the vote for governor, so Lieutenant Governor-elect Wilbour acted as governor for the term.)	Acting as governor
7	James Fenner (1771–1846)	May 6, 1807 – May 1, 1811 (1457 days; lost election)	Democratic- Republican	1807	Constant Taber
7	James Fenner (1771–1846)	May 6, 1807 – May 1, 1811 (1457 days; lost election)	Democratic- Republican	1808	Simeon Martin
7	James Fenner (1771–1846)	May 6, 1807 – May 1, 1811 (1457 days; lost election)	Democratic- Republican	1809	Simeon Martin
7	James Fenner (1771–1846)	May 6, 1807 – May 1, 1811 (1457 days; lost election)	Democratic- Republican	1810	Isaac Wilbour
8	William Jones (1753–1822)	May 1, 1811 – May 7, 1817 (2199 days; lost election)	Federalist	1811	Simeon Martin
8	William Jones (1753–1822)	May 1, 1811 – May 7, 1817 (2199 days; lost election)	Federalist	1812	Simeon Martin
8	William Jones (1753–1822)	May 1, 1811 – May 7, 1817 (2199 days; lost election)	Federalist	1813	Simeon Martin
8	William Jones (1753–1822)	May 1, 1811 – May 7, 1817 (2199 days; lost election)	Federalist	1814	Simeon Martin
8	William Jones (1753–1822)	May 1, 1811 – May 7, 1817 (2199 days; lost election)	Federalist	1815	Simeon Martin
8	William Jones (1753–1822)	May 1, 1811 – May 7, 1817 (2199 days; lost election)	Federalist	1816	Jeremiah Thurston
9	Nehemiah R. Knight (1780–1854)	May 7, 1817 – January 9, 1821 (1344 days; resigned) (Note: Knight resigned, having been elected to the United States Senate.)	Democratic- Republican	1817	Edward Wilcox
9	Nehemiah R. Knight (1780–1854)	May 7, 1817 – January 9, 1821 (1344 days; resigned)	Democratic- Republican	1818	Edward Wilcox
9	Nehemiah R. Knight (1780–1854)	May 7, 1817 – January 9, 1821 (1344 days; resigned)	Democratic- Republican	1819	Edward Wilcox
9	Nehemiah R. Knight (1780–1854)	May 7, 1817 – January 9, 1821 (1344 days; resigned)	Democratic- Republican	1820	Edward Wilcox
10	Edward Wilcox (1751–1838)	January 9, 1821 – May 2, 1821 (114 days; retired)	Democratic- Republican	Succeeded from lieutenant governor (Note: Very little is known of Wilcox, and he does not appear on most lists of governors, but it is known he was lieutenant governor at the time Knight resigned, and at least one reference specifically states he succeeded Knight.)	Vacant
11	William C. Gibbs (1787–1871)	May 2, 1821 – May 5, 1824 (1100 days; retired)	Democratic- Republican	1821	Caleb Earle
11	William C. Gibbs (1787–1871)	May 2, 1821 – May 5, 1824 (1100 days; retired)	Democratic- Republican	1822	Caleb Earle
11	William C. Gibbs (1787–1871)	May 2, 1821 – May 5, 1824 (1100 days; retired)	Democratic- Republican	1823	Caleb Earle
12	James Fenner (1771–1846)	May 5, 1824 – May 4, 1831 (2556 days; lost election)	Democratic- Republican	1824	Charles Collins
12	James Fenner (1771–1846)	May 5, 1824 – May 4, 1831 (2556 days; lost election)	Democratic- Republican	1825	Charles Collins
12	James Fenner (1771–1846)	May 5, 1824 – May 4, 1831 (2556 days; lost election)	Democratic- Republican	1826	Charles Collins
12	James Fenner (1771–1846)	May 5, 1824 – May 4, 1831 (2556 days; lost election)	Democratic- Republican	1827	Charles Collins
12	James Fenner (1771–1846)	May 5, 1824 – May 4, 1831 (2556 days; lost election)	Democratic- Republican	1828	Charles Collins
12	James Fenner (1771–1846)	May 5, 1824 – May 4, 1831 (2556 days; lost election)	Democratic- Republican	1829	Charles Collins
12	James Fenner (1771–1846)	May 5, 1824 – May 4, 1831 (2556 days; lost election)	Democratic- Republican	1830	Charles Collins
13	Lemuel H. Arnold (1792–1852)	May 4, 1831 – May 1, 1833 (729 days; lost election)	National; Republican	1831	Charles Collins
13	Lemuel H. Arnold (1792–1852)	May 4, 1831 – May 1, 1833 (729 days; lost election)	National; Republican	1832 (Note: No candidate received a majority of the vote for governor, and four run-offs were attempted during the year but all were similarly deadlocked. Arnold remained as governor, and in January 1833, the state legislature formalized it, permitting him to continue on as governor until the end of the term.)	Charles Collins
14	John Brown Francis (1791–1864)	May 1, 1833 – May 2, 1838 (1828 days; lost election)	Democratic- Republican/ Anti-Masonic	1833	Jeffrey Hazard
14	John Brown Francis (1791–1864)	May 1, 1833 – May 2, 1838 (1828 days; lost election)	Democratic	1834	Jeffrey Hazard
14	John Brown Francis (1791–1864)	May 1, 1833 – May 2, 1838 (1828 days; lost election)	Democratic	1835	George Engs
14	John Brown Francis (1791–1864)	May 1, 1833 – May 2, 1838 (1828 days; lost election)	Democratic	1836	Jeffrey Hazard
14	John Brown Francis (1791–1864)	May 1, 1833 – May 2, 1838 (1828 days; lost election)	Democratic	1837	Benjamin B. Thurston
15	William Sprague III (1799–1856)	May 2, 1838 – May 2, 1839 (366 days; lost election)	Whig	1838	Joseph Childs
16	Samuel Ward King (1786–1851)	May 2, 1839 – May 2, 1843 (1462 days; retired)	Whig	1839 (Note: No candidate received a majority of the vote for either governor or lieutenant governor, so as First Senator, King served as acting governor for the year.)	Byron Diman
16	Samuel Ward King (1786–1851)	May 2, 1839 – May 2, 1843 (1462 days; retired)	Whig	1840	Byron Diman
16	Samuel Ward King (1786–1851)	May 2, 1839 – May 2, 1843 (1462 days; retired)	Whig	1841	Byron Diman
16	Samuel Ward King (1786–1851)	May 2, 1839 – May 2, 1843 (1462 days; retired)	Whig	1842 (Note: A constitutional convention, without consent from the legislature, convened in 1842 and, on May 2, proclaimed Thomas Wilson Dorr as governor, which led to a brief period of strife known as the Dorr Rebellion.)	Byron Diman
17	James Fenner (1771–1846)	May 2, 1843 – May 6, 1845 (736 days; lost election)	Law and Order	1843	Byron Diman
17	James Fenner (1771–1846)	May 2, 1843 – May 6, 1845 (736 days; lost election)	Law and Order	1844	Byron Diman
18	Charles Jackson (1797–1876)	May 6, 1845 – May 6, 1846 (366 days; lost election)	Liberation	1845	Byron Diman
19	Byron Diman (1795–1865)	May 6, 1846 – May 4, 1847 (364 days; retired)	Law and Order	1846	Elisha Harris
20	Elisha Harris (1791–1861)	May 4, 1847 – May 1, 1849 (729 days; retired)	Whig	1847	Edward W. Lawton
20	Elisha Harris (1791–1861)	May 4, 1847 – May 1, 1849 (729 days; retired)	Whig	1848	Edward W. Lawton
21	Henry B. Anthony (1815–1884)	May 1, 1849 – May 6, 1851 (736 days; retired)	Whig	1849	Thomas Whipple
21	Henry B. Anthony (1815–1884)	May 1, 1849 – May 6, 1851 (736 days; retired)	Whig	1850	Thomas Whipple
22	Philip Allen (1785–1865)	May 6, 1851 – July 20, 1853 (807 days; resigned) (Note: Allen resigned, having been elected to the United States Senate.)	Democratic	1851	William Beach Lawrence
22	Philip Allen (1785–1865)	May 6, 1851 – July 20, 1853 (807 days; resigned)	Democratic	1852	Samuel G. Arnold
22	Philip Allen (1785–1865)	May 6, 1851 – July 20, 1853 (807 days; resigned)	Democratic	1853	Francis M. Dimond
23	Francis M. Dimond (1796–1859)	July 20, 1853 – May 2, 1854 (287 days; lost election)	Democratic	Succeeded from lieutenant governor	Vacant
24	William W. Hoppin (1807–1890)	May 2, 1854 – May 26, 1857 (1121 days; retired)	Whig (Note: Glashan and Sobel & Raimo label Hoppin as a Whig and Maine Law candidate in 1854; Dubin, and Kallenbach label him a Whig and American in 1855, and a Republican and American in 1856.)	1854	John J. Reynolds
24	William W. Hoppin (1807–1890)	May 2, 1854 – May 26, 1857 (1121 days; retired)	Whig	1855	Anderson C. Rose
24	William W. Hoppin (1807–1890)	May 2, 1854 – May 26, 1857 (1121 days; retired)	Whig	1856	Nicholas Brown III
25	Elisha Dyer (1811–1890)	May 26, 1857 – May 31, 1859 (736 days; retired)	Republican	1857	Thomas G. Turner
25	Elisha Dyer (1811–1890)	May 26, 1857 – May 31, 1859 (736 days; retired)	Republican	1858	Thomas G. Turner
26	Thomas G. Turner (1810–1875)	May 31, 1859 – May 29, 1860 (365 days; lost nomination) (Note: Turner lost the Republican nomination to Seth Padelford.)	Republican	1859	Isaac Saunders
27	William Sprague IV (1830–1915)	May 29, 1860 – March 3, 1863 (1009 days; resigned) (Note: Sprague resigned, having been elected to the United States Senate.)	Democratic (Note: Sprague was elected as part of a Democratic and Conservative Republican ticket in 1860, and afterwards as a Union candidate.)	1860	J. Russell Bullock
27	William Sprague IV (1830–1915)	May 29, 1860 – March 3, 1863 (1009 days; resigned)	Democratic	1861	J. Russell Bullock
27	William Sprague IV (1830–1915)	May 29, 1860 – March 3, 1863 (1009 days; resigned)	Democratic	1862	Samuel G. Arnold (resigned December 1, 1862)
27	William Sprague IV (1830–1915)	May 29, 1860 – March 3, 1863 (1009 days; resigned)	Democratic	1862	Vacant
28	William C. Cozzens (1811–1876)	March 3, 1863 – May 26, 1863 (85 days; lost election)	Democratic	Succeeded from president of the Senate (Note: As the office of lieutenant governor was vacant, President pro tempore of the Senate Cozzens succeeded to governor.)	Vacant
29	James Y. Smith (1809–1876)	May 26, 1863 – May 29, 1866 (1100 days; retired)	Republican	1863	Seth Padelford
29	James Y. Smith (1809–1876)	May 26, 1863 – May 29, 1866 (1100 days; retired)	Republican	1864	Seth Padelford
29	James Y. Smith (1809–1876)	May 26, 1863 – May 29, 1866 (1100 days; retired)	Republican	1865	Duncan Pell
30	Ambrose Burnside (1824–1881)	May 29, 1866 – May 25, 1869 (1093 days; retired)	Republican	1866	William Greene III
30	Ambrose Burnside (1824–1881)	May 29, 1866 – May 25, 1869 (1093 days; retired)	Republican	1867	William Greene III
30	Ambrose Burnside (1824–1881)	May 29, 1866 – May 25, 1869 (1093 days; retired)	Republican	1868	Pardon Stevens
31	Seth Padelford (1807–1878)	May 25, 1869 – May 27, 1873 (1464 days; retired)	Republican	1869	Pardon Stevens
31	Seth Padelford (1807–1878)	May 25, 1869 – May 27, 1873 (1464 days; retired)	Republican	1870	Pardon Stevens
31	Seth Padelford (1807–1878)	May 25, 1869 – May 27, 1873 (1464 days; retired)	Republican	1871	Pardon Stevens
31	Seth Padelford (1807–1878)	May 25, 1869 – May 27, 1873 (1464 days; retired)	Republican	1872	Charles Cutler
32	Henry Howard (1826–1905)	May 27, 1873 – May 25, 1875 (729 days; retired)	Republican (Note: Howard represented the Republican and Prohibition parties.)	1873	Charles C. Van Zandt
32	Henry Howard (1826–1905)	May 27, 1873 – May 25, 1875 (729 days; retired)	Republican	1874	Charles C. Van Zandt
33	Henry Lippitt (1818–1891)	May 25, 1875 – May 29, 1877 (736 days; retired)	Republican	1875	Henry Tillinghast Sisson
33	Henry Lippitt (1818–1891)	May 25, 1875 – May 29, 1877 (736 days; retired)	Republican	1876	Henry Tillinghast Sisson
34	Charles C. Van Zandt (1830–1894)	May 29, 1877 – May 25, 1880 (1093 days; retired)	Republican (Note: Van Zandt represented the Republican and Prohibition parties.)	1877	Albert Howard
34	Charles C. Van Zandt (1830–1894)	May 29, 1877 – May 25, 1880 (1093 days; retired)	Republican	1878	Albert Howard
34	Charles C. Van Zandt (1830–1894)	May 29, 1877 – May 25, 1880 (1093 days; retired)	Republican	1879	Albert Howard
35	Alfred H. Littlefield (1829–1893)	May 25, 1880 – May 29, 1883 (1100 days; retired)	Republican	1880	Henry Fay
35	Alfred H. Littlefield (1829–1893)	May 25, 1880 – May 29, 1883 (1100 days; retired)	Republican	1881	Henry Fay
35	Alfred H. Littlefield (1829–1893)	May 25, 1880 – May 29, 1883 (1100 days; retired)	Republican	1882	Henry Fay
36	Augustus O. Bourn (1834–1925)	May 29, 1883 – May 26, 1885 (729 days; retired)	Republican	1883	Oscar Rathbun
36	Augustus O. Bourn (1834–1925)	May 29, 1883 – May 26, 1885 (729 days; retired)	Republican	1884	Oscar Rathbun
37	George P. Wetmore (1846–1921)	May 26, 1885 – May 31, 1887 (736 days; lost election)	Republican	1885	Lucius B. Darling
37	George P. Wetmore (1846–1921)	May 26, 1885 – May 31, 1887 (736 days; lost election)	Republican	1886	Lucius B. Darling
38	John W. Davis (1826–1907)	May 31, 1887 – May 29, 1888 (365 days; lost election)	Democratic	1887	Samuel R. Honey
39	Royal C. Taft (1823–1912)	May 29, 1888 – May 28, 1889 (365 days; retired)	Republican	1888	Enos Lapham
40	Herbert W. Ladd (1843–1913)	May 28, 1889 – May 27, 1890 (365 days; lost election)	Republican	1889	Daniel Littlefield
41	John W. Davis (1826–1907)	May 27, 1890 – May 26, 1891 (365 days; lost election)	Democratic	1890	William T. C. Wardwell
42	Herbert W. Ladd (1843–1913)	May 26, 1891 – May 31, 1892 (372 days; retired)	Republican	1891	Henry A. Stearns
43	Daniel Russell Brown (1848–1919)	May 31, 1892 – May 29, 1895 (1094 days; retired)	Republican	1892	Melville Bull
43	Daniel Russell Brown (1848–1919)	May 31, 1892 – May 29, 1895 (1094 days; retired)	Republican	1893	Melville Bull
43	Daniel Russell Brown (1848–1919)	May 31, 1892 – May 29, 1895 (1094 days; retired)	Republican	1894	Edwin Allen
44	Charles W. Lippitt (1846–1924)	May 29, 1895 – May 25, 1897 (728 days; retired)	Republican	1895	Edwin Allen
44	Charles W. Lippitt (1846–1924)	May 29, 1895 – May 25, 1897 (728 days; retired)	Republican	1896	Edwin Allen
45	Elisha Dyer Jr. (1839–1906)	May 25, 1897 – May 29, 1900 (1100 days; retired)	Republican	1897	Aram J. Pothier
45	Elisha Dyer Jr. (1839–1906)	May 25, 1897 – May 29, 1900 (1100 days; retired)	Republican	1898	William Gregory
45	Elisha Dyer Jr. (1839–1906)	May 25, 1897 – May 29, 1900 (1100 days; retired)	Republican	1899	William Gregory
46	William Gregory (1849–1901)	May 29, 1900 – December 16, 1901 (567 days; died in office)	Republican	1900	Charles D. Kimball
47	Charles D. Kimball (1859–1930)	December 16, 1901 – January 6, 1903 (387 day; lost election)	Republican	Succeeded from lieutenant governor	Vacant
47	Charles D. Kimball (1859–1930)	December 16, 1901 – January 6, 1903 (387 day; lost election)	Republican	1901 (Note: Incumbent governor William Gregory was reelected in November 1901, but died the next month, so Lieutenant Governor Kimball succeeded him.)	Vacant
47	Charles D. Kimball (1859–1930)	December 16, 1901 – January 6, 1903 (387 day; lost election)	Republican	1901	George L. Shepley (elected February 18, 1902)
48	Lucius F. C. Garvin (1841–1922)	January 6, 1903 – January 3, 1905 (729 days; lost election)	Democratic	1902	Adelard Archambault
48	Lucius F. C. Garvin (1841–1922)	January 6, 1903 – January 3, 1905 (729 days; lost election)	Democratic	1903	George H. Utter
49	George H. Utter (1854–1912)	January 3, 1905 – January 1, 1907 (729 days; lost election)	Republican	1904	Frederick H. Jackson
49	George H. Utter (1854–1912)	January 3, 1905 – January 1, 1907 (729 days; lost election)	Republican	1905	Frederick H. Jackson
50	James H. Higgins (1876–1927)	January 1, 1907 – January 5, 1909 (736 days; retired)	Democratic	1906	Frederick H. Jackson
50	James H. Higgins (1876–1927)	January 1, 1907 – January 5, 1909 (736 days; retired)	Democratic	1907	Ralph Watrous
51	Aram J. Pothier (1854–1928)	January 5, 1909 – January 5, 1915 (2192 days; retired)	Republican	1908	Arthur W. Dennis
51	Aram J. Pothier (1854–1928)	January 5, 1909 – January 5, 1915 (2192 days; retired)	Republican	1909	Emery J. San Souci
51	Aram J. Pothier (1854–1928)	January 5, 1909 – January 5, 1915 (2192 days; retired)	Republican	1910	Emery J. San Souci
51	Aram J. Pothier (1854–1928)	January 5, 1909 – January 5, 1915 (2192 days; retired)	Republican	1911	Emery J. San Souci
51	Aram J. Pothier (1854–1928)	January 5, 1909 – January 5, 1915 (2192 days; retired)	Republican	1912	Roswell B. Burchard
52	Robert Livingston Beeckman (1866–1935)	January 5, 1915 – January 4, 1921 (2192 days; retired)	Republican	1914	Emery J. San Souci
52	Robert Livingston Beeckman (1866–1935)	January 5, 1915 – January 4, 1921 (2192 days; retired)	Republican	1916	Emery J. San Souci
52	Robert Livingston Beeckman (1866–1935)	January 5, 1915 – January 4, 1921 (2192 days; retired)	Republican	1918	Emery J. San Souci
53	Emery J. San Souci (1857–1936)	January 4, 1921 – January 2, 1923 (729 days; lost nomination) (Note: San Souci lost the Republican nomination to Harold Gross.)	Republican	1920	Harold Gross
54	William S. Flynn (1885–1966)	January 2, 1923 – January 6, 1925 (736 days; retired) (Note: Flynn instead ran unsuccessfully for the United States Senate.)	Democratic	1922	Felix A. Toupin
55	Aram J. Pothier (1854–1928)	January 6, 1925 – February 4, 1928 (1125 days; died in office)	Republican	1924	Nathaniel W. Smith
55	Aram J. Pothier (1854–1928)	January 6, 1925 – February 4, 1928 (1125 days; died in office)	Republican	1926	Norman S. Case
56	Norman S. Case (1888–1967)	February 4, 1928 – January 3, 1933 (1796 days; lost election)	Republican	Succeeded from lieutenant governor	Vacant
56	Norman S. Case (1888–1967)	February 4, 1928 – January 3, 1933 (1796 days; lost election)	Republican	1928	James G. Connelly
56	Norman S. Case (1888–1967)	February 4, 1928 – January 3, 1933 (1796 days; lost election)	Republican	1930	James G. Connelly
57	Theodore F. Green (1867–1966)	January 3, 1933 – January 5, 1937 (1464 days; retired) (Note: Green was instead elected to the United States Senate.)	Democratic	1932	Robert E. Quinn
57	Theodore F. Green (1867–1966)	January 3, 1933 – January 5, 1937 (1464 days; retired)	Democratic	1934	Robert E. Quinn
58	Robert E. Quinn (1894–1975)	January 5, 1937 – January 3, 1939 (729 days; lost election)	Democratic	1936	Raymond E. Jordan
59	William Henry Vanderbilt III (1901–1981)	January 3, 1939 – January 7, 1941 (736 days; lost election)	Republican	1938	James O. McManus
60	J. Howard McGrath (1903–1966)	January 7, 1941 – October 6, 1945 (1734 days; resigned) (Note: McGrath resigned, having been confirmed as Solicitor General of the United States.)	Democratic	1940	Louis W. Cappelli
60	J. Howard McGrath (1903–1966)	January 7, 1941 – October 6, 1945 (1734 days; resigned)	Democratic	1942	Louis W. Cappelli
60	J. Howard McGrath (1903–1966)	January 7, 1941 – October 6, 1945 (1734 days; resigned)	Democratic	1944	John Pastore
61	John Pastore (1907–2000)	October 6, 1945 – December 19, 1950 (1901 days; resigned) (Note: Pastore resigned, having been elected to the United States Senate.)	Democratic	Succeeded from lieutenant governor	John S. McKiernan
61	John Pastore (1907–2000)	October 6, 1945 – December 19, 1950 (1901 days; resigned)	Democratic	1946	John S. McKiernan
61	John Pastore (1907–2000)	October 6, 1945 – December 19, 1950 (1901 days; resigned)	Democratic	1948	John S. McKiernan
62	John S. McKiernan (1911–1997)	December 19, 1950 – January 2, 1951 (15 days; retired) (Note: McKiernan had already been reelected lieutenant governor when he succeeded Pastore.)	Democratic	Succeeded from lieutenant governor	Vacant
63	Dennis J. Roberts (1903–1994)	January 2, 1951 – January 6, 1959 (2927 days; lost election)	Democratic	1950	John S. McKiernan
63	Dennis J. Roberts (1903–1994)	January 2, 1951 – January 6, 1959 (2927 days; lost election)	Democratic	1952	John S. McKiernan
63	Dennis J. Roberts (1903–1994)	January 2, 1951 – January 6, 1959 (2927 days; lost election)	Democratic	1954	John S. McKiernan
63	Dennis J. Roberts (1903–1994)	January 2, 1951 – January 6, 1959 (2927 days; lost election)	Democratic	1956	Armand H. Cote
64	Christopher Del Sesto (1907–1973)	January 6, 1959 – January 3, 1961 (729 days; lost election)	Republican	1958	John A. Notte Jr.
65	John A. Notte Jr. (1909–1983)	January 3, 1961 – January 1, 1963 (729 days; lost election)	Democratic	1960	Edward P. Gallogly
66	John Chafee (1922–1999)	January 1, 1963 – January 7, 1969 (2199 days; lost election)	Republican	1962	Edward P. Gallogly
66	John Chafee (1922–1999)	January 1, 1963 – January 7, 1969 (2199 days; lost election)	Republican	1964	Giovanni Folcarelli
66	John Chafee (1922–1999)	January 1, 1963 – January 7, 1969 (2199 days; lost election)	Republican	1966	Joseph O'Donnell Jr.
67	Frank Licht (1916–1987)	January 7, 1969 – January 2, 1973 (1457 days; retired)	Democratic	1968	J. Joseph Garrahy
67	Frank Licht (1916–1987)	January 7, 1969 – January 2, 1973 (1457 days; retired)	Democratic	1970	J. Joseph Garrahy
68	Philip Noel (b. 1931)	January 2, 1973 – January 4, 1977 (1464 days; retired) (Note: Noel instead ran unsuccessfully for the Democratic nomination for the United States Senate.)	Democratic	1972	J. Joseph Garrahy
68	Philip Noel (b. 1931)	January 2, 1973 – January 4, 1977 (1464 days; retired)	Democratic	1974	J. Joseph Garrahy
69	J. Joseph Garrahy (1930–2012)	January 4, 1977 – January 1, 1985 (2920 days; retired)	Democratic	1976	Thomas R. DiLuglio
69	J. Joseph Garrahy (1930–2012)	January 4, 1977 – January 1, 1985 (2920 days; retired)	Democratic	1978	Thomas R. DiLuglio
69	J. Joseph Garrahy (1930–2012)	January 4, 1977 – January 1, 1985 (2920 days; retired)	Democratic	1980	Thomas R. DiLuglio
69	J. Joseph Garrahy (1930–2012)	January 4, 1977 – January 1, 1985 (2920 days; retired)	Democratic	1982	Thomas R. DiLuglio
70	Edward D. DiPrete (1934–2025)	January 1, 1985 – January 1, 1991 (2192 days; lost election)	Republican	1984	Richard A. Licht
70	Edward D. DiPrete (1934–2025)	January 1, 1985 – January 1, 1991 (2192 days; lost election)	Republican	1986	Richard A. Licht
70	Edward D. DiPrete (1934–2025)	January 1, 1985 – January 1, 1991 (2192 days; lost election)	Republican	1988	Roger N. Begin
71	Bruce Sundlun (1920–2011)	January 1, 1991 – January 3, 1995 (1464 days; lost nomination) (Note: Sundlun lost the Democratic nomination to Myrth York.)	Democratic	1990	Roger N. Begin
71	Bruce Sundlun (1920–2011)	January 1, 1991 – January 3, 1995 (1464 days; lost nomination)	Democratic	1992	Robert Weygand
72	Lincoln Almond (1936–2023)	January 3, 1995 – January 7, 2003 (2927 days; term-limited) (Note: Under a 1992 amendment to the constitution, governors are ineligible to serve consecutively for more than two terms.)	Republican	1994	Robert Weygand
72	Lincoln Almond (1936–2023)	January 3, 1995 – January 7, 2003 (2927 days; term-limited)	Republican	1994	Bernard Jackvony
72	Lincoln Almond (1936–2023)	January 3, 1995 – January 7, 2003 (2927 days; term-limited)	Republican	1998	Charles Fogarty
73	Donald Carcieri (b. 1942)	January 7, 2003 – January 4, 2011 (2920 days; term-limited)	Republican	2002	Charles Fogarty
73	Donald Carcieri (b. 1942)	January 7, 2003 – January 4, 2011 (2920 days; term-limited)	Republican	2006	Elizabeth H. Roberts
74	Lincoln Chafee (b. 1953)	January 4, 2011 – January 6, 2015 (1464 days; retired)	Independent (Note: Chafee was elected as an independent, but on May 30, 2013, he joined the Democratic Party.)	2010	Elizabeth H. Roberts
75	Gina Raimondo (b. 1971)	January 6, 2015 – March 2, 2021 (2248 days; resigned) (Note: Raimondo resigned, having been confirmed as United States Secretary of Commerce.)	Democratic	2014	Dan McKee
75	Gina Raimondo (b. 1971)	January 6, 2015 – March 2, 2021 (2248 days; resigned)	Democratic	2018	Dan McKee
76	Dan McKee (b. 1951)	March 2, 2021 – Incumbent (Note: McKee's first full term began on January 3, 2023, and will expire on January 5, 2027; he lost the Democratic nomination to Helena Foulkes.) (in office 2092 days)	Democratic	Succeeded from lieutenant governor	Sabina Matos
76	Dan McKee (b. 1951)	March 2, 2021 – Incumbent (in office 2092 days)	Democratic	2022	Sabina Matos
77	Helena Foulkes (b. 1964)	Governor-elect takes office January 5, 2027	Democratic	2026	Sabina Matos

== See also ==
- Gubernatorial lines of succession in the United States § Rhode Island
- List of lieutenant governors of Rhode Island
- List of colonial governors of Rhode Island
- List of Rhode Island General Assemblies

== Sources ==
- "Former Rhode Island Governors". National Governors Association.
- "Rhode Island Constitution". State Democracy Research Initiative. University of Wisconsin Law School.
- Dubin, Michael J. (2003). United States Gubernatorial Elections, 1776–1860: The Official Results by State and County. McFarland. ISBN 0-7864-1439-1 – via Internet Archive.
- Glashan, Roy R. (1979). American Governors and Gubernatorial Elections, 1775-1978. Meckler Books. ISBN 0-7201-1511-6 – via Internet Archive.
- Kallenbach, Joseph E.; Kallenbach, Jessamine S. (1977). American State Governors, 1776-1976. Oceana Publications. ISBN 978-0-379-00665-0 – via Internet Archive.
- Mullaney, Marie Marmo (1994). Biographical Directory of the Governors of the United States, 1988–1994. Greenwood Publishing Group. ISBN 0-313-28312-5 – via Internet Archive.
- Sobel, Robert; Raimo, John (1978). Biographical Directory of the Governors of the United States, 1789-1978. Vol. 4. Meckler Books. ISBN 0-930466-01-2 – via Internet Archive.
- Thorpe, Francis Newton, ed. (1909). The Federal and State Constitutions, Colonial Charters, and Other Organic Laws of the States, Territories, and Colonies Now or Heretofore Forming the United States of America. Vol. 6. United States Government Publishing Office – via Internet Archive.
