= 1874 Rhode Island gubernatorial election =

- April 1, 1874
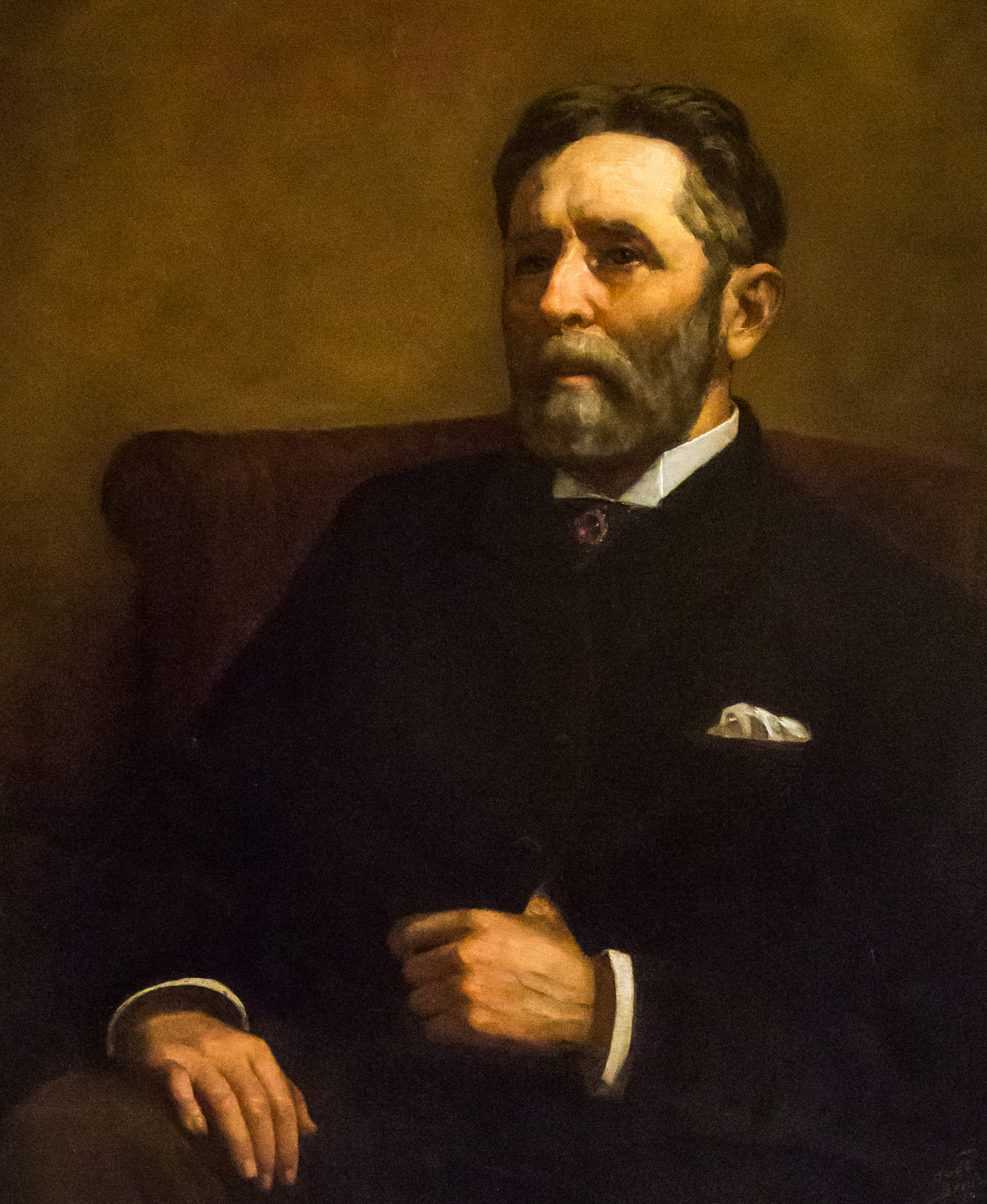

Nominee	Henry Howard	Lyman Pierce
Party	Republican	Democratic
Popular vote	12,335	1,589
Percentage	87.48%	11.27%
- County results Howard: 60–70% 80–90% >90%
Governor before election
Henry Howard
Republican
Elected Governor
Henry Howard
Republican

The 1874 Rhode Island gubernatorial election was held on April 1, 1874, in order to elect the governor of Rhode Island. Incumbent Republican governor Henry Howard won re-election against Democratic nominee Lyman Pierce.

== General election ==
On election day, April 1, 1874, incumbent Republican governor Henry Howard won re-election by a margin of 10,746 votes against his opponent Democratic nominee Lyman Pierce, thereby retaining Republican control over the office of governor. Howard was sworn in for his second term on May 5, 1874.

=== Results ===
Rhode Island gubernatorial election, 1874
Party	Candidate	Votes	%
Republican	Henry Howard (incumbent)	12,335	87.48
Democratic	Lyman Pierce	1,589	11.27
	Scattering	177	1.25
Total votes		14,101	100.00
Republican hold			
