= 1873 Rhode Island gubernatorial election =

- April 2, 1873
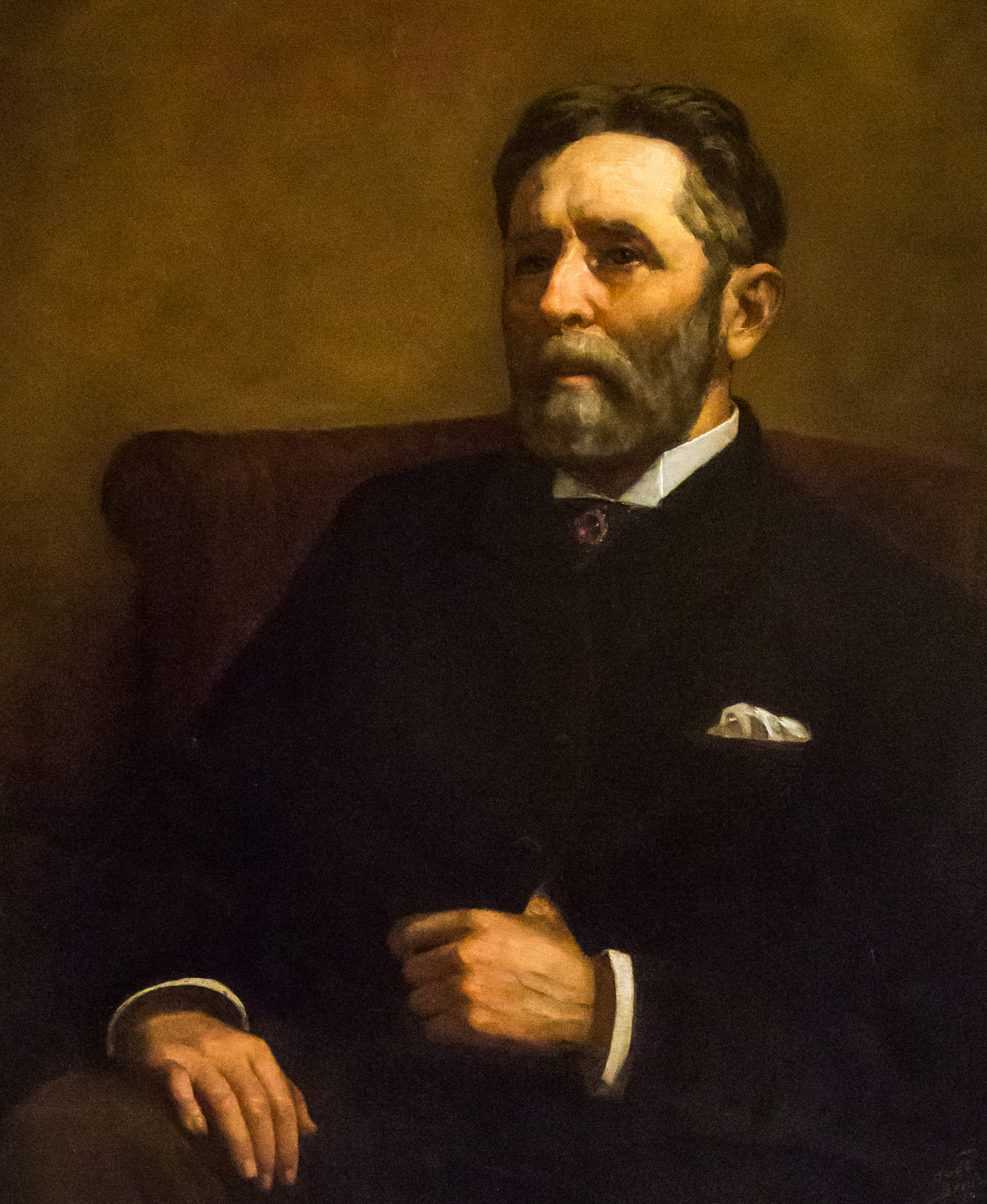

Nominee	Henry Howard	Benjamin G. Chace
Party	Republican	Democratic
Popular vote	9,656	3,786
Percentage	71.68%	28.11%
- County results Howard: 60–70% 70–80% >90%
Governor before election
Seth Padelford
Republican
Elected Governor
Henry Howard
Republican

The 1873 Rhode Island gubernatorial election was held on April 2, 1873, in order to elect the governor of Rhode Island. Republican nominee Henry Howard defeated Democratic nominee Benjamin G. Chace.

== General election ==
On election day, April 2, 1873, Republican nominee Henry Howard won the election by a margin of 5,870 votes against his opponent Democratic nominee Benjamin G. Chace, thereby retaining Republican control over the office of governor. Howard was sworn in as the 32nd governor of Rhode Island on May 6, 1873.

=== Results ===
Rhode Island gubernatorial election, 1873
Party	Candidate	Votes	%
Republican	Henry Howard	9,656	71.68
Democratic	Benjamin G. Chace	3,786	28.11
	Scattering	29	0.21
Total votes		13,471	100.00
Republican hold			
