= 1777 Rhode Island gubernatorial election =

- April 2, 1777
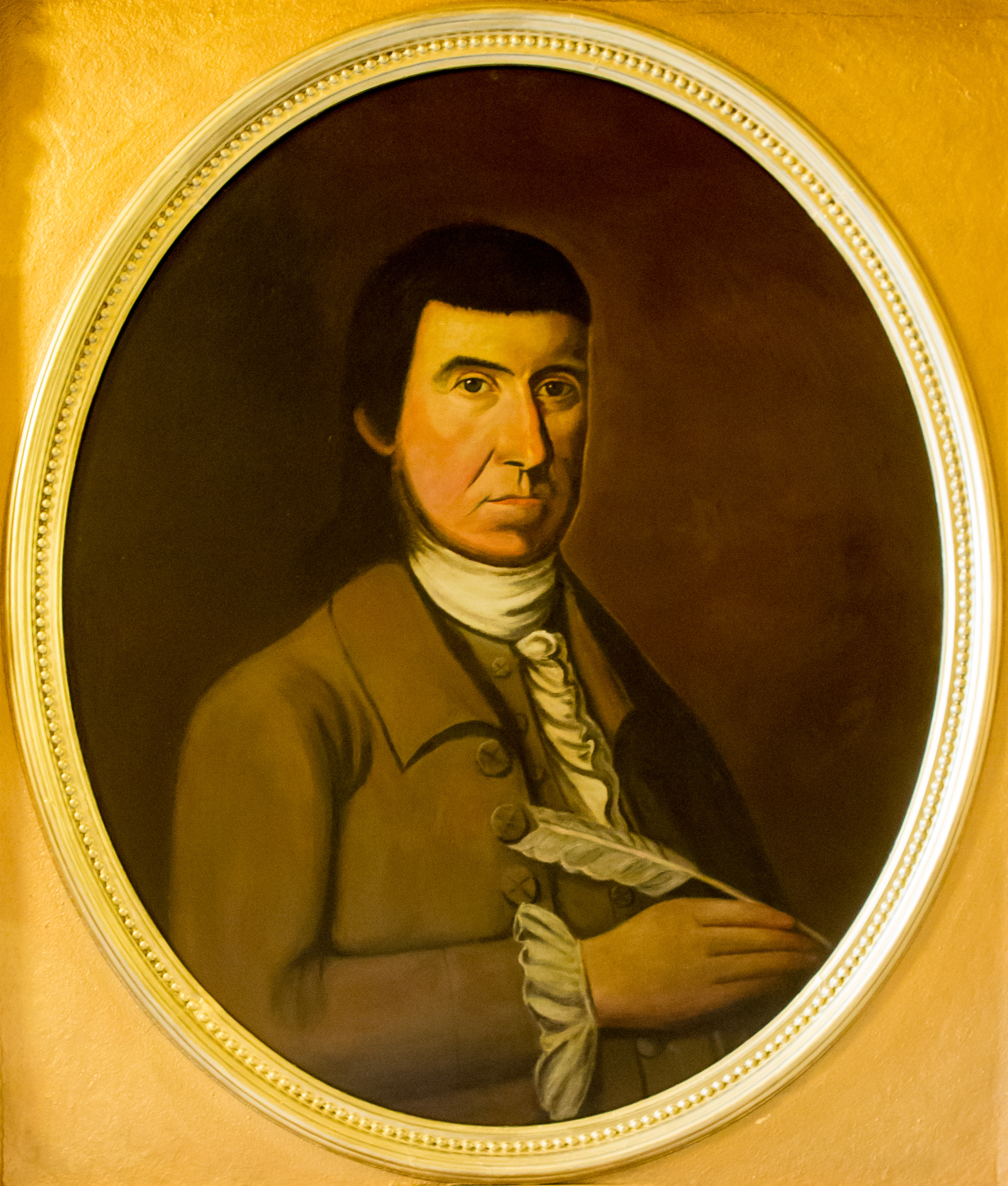
Nominee	Nicholas Cooke
Party	Independent
Percentage	100.00%
Governor before election
Nicholas Cooke
Independent
Elected Governor
Nicholas Cooke
Independent

The 1777 Rhode Island gubernatorial election was held on April 2, 1777, in order to elect the governor of Rhode Island. Incumbent Independent governor Nicholas Cooke won re-election as he ran unopposed. The exact number of votes cast in this election are unknown.

== General election ==
On election day, April 2, 1777, incumbent Independent governor Nicholas Cooke won re-election as he ran unopposed, thereby retaining Independent control over the office of governor. Cooke was sworn in for his second term on May 5, 1777.

=== Results ===
Rhode Island gubernatorial election, 1777
Party	Candidate	Votes	%
Independent	Nicholas Cooke (incumbent)		100.00
Total votes			100.00
Independent hold			
