= 1852 Rhode Island gubernatorial election =

- April 7, 1852
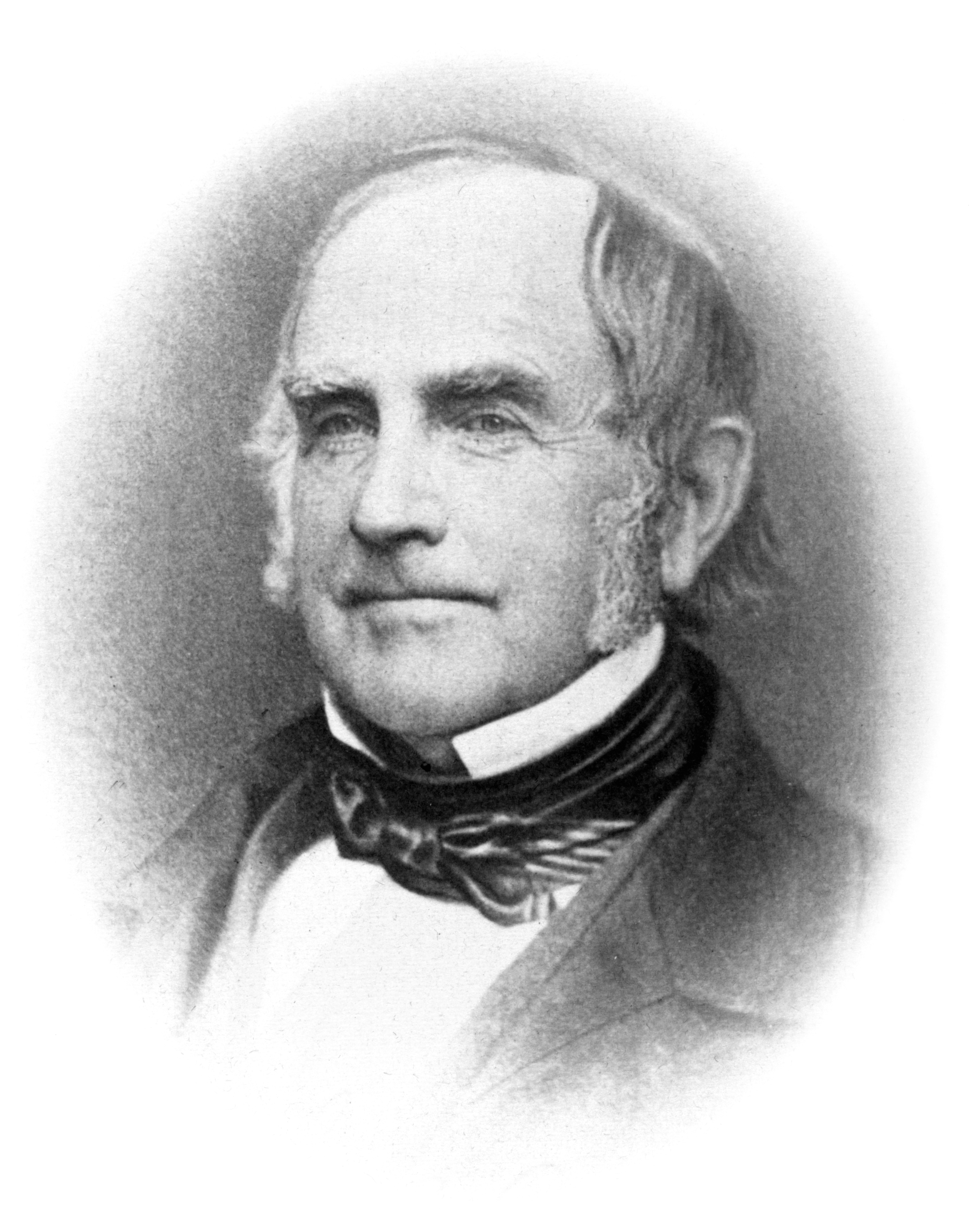

Nominee	Philip Allen	Josiah Harris
Party	Democratic	Whig
Popular vote	9,151	8,749
Percentage	51.10%	48.86%
- County results Allen: 50–60% Harris: 50–60% 60–70%
Governor before election
Philip Allen
Democratic
Elected Governor
Philip Allen
Democratic

The 1852 Rhode Island gubernatorial election was held on April 7, 1852, in order to elect the governor of Rhode Island. Incumbent Democratic governor Philip Allen won re-election against Whig nominee Josiah Harris.

== General election ==
On election day, April 7, 1852, incumbent Democratic governor Philip Allen won re-election by a margin of 402 votes against his Whig opponent Josiah Chapin, thereby keeping democratic control over the office of governor. Allen was sworn in for his second term on May 6, 1852.

=== Results ===
Rhode Island gubernatorial election, 1852
Party	Candidate	Votes	%
Democratic	Philip Allen (incumbent)	9,151	51.10
Whig	Josiah Harris	8,749	48.86
Scattering		8	0.04
Total votes		17,908	100.00
Democratic hold			
