= 1786 Rhode Island gubernatorial election =

- April 5, 1786

Nominee	John Collins	William Greene
Party	Independent	Independent
Percentage	Unknown	Unknown
Governor before election
William Greene
Independent
Elected Governor
John Collins
Independent

The 1786 Rhode Island gubernatorial election was held on April 5, 1786, in order to elect the governor of Rhode Island. Independent candidate and former Delegate to the Continental Congress from Rhode Island John Collins defeated incumbent Independent governor William Greene. The exact number of votes cast in this election are unknown.

== General election ==
On election day, April 5, 1786, Independent candidate John Collins won the election against his opponent incumbent Independent governor William Greene, thereby retaining Independent control over the office of governor. Collins was sworn in as the 3rd governor of Rhode Island on May 5, 1786.

=== Results ===
Rhode Island gubernatorial election, 1786
Party	Candidate	Votes	%
Independent	John Collins		
Independent	William Greene (incumbent)		
Total votes			100.00
Independent hold			
