= 1793 Rhode Island gubernatorial election =

- April 3, 1793
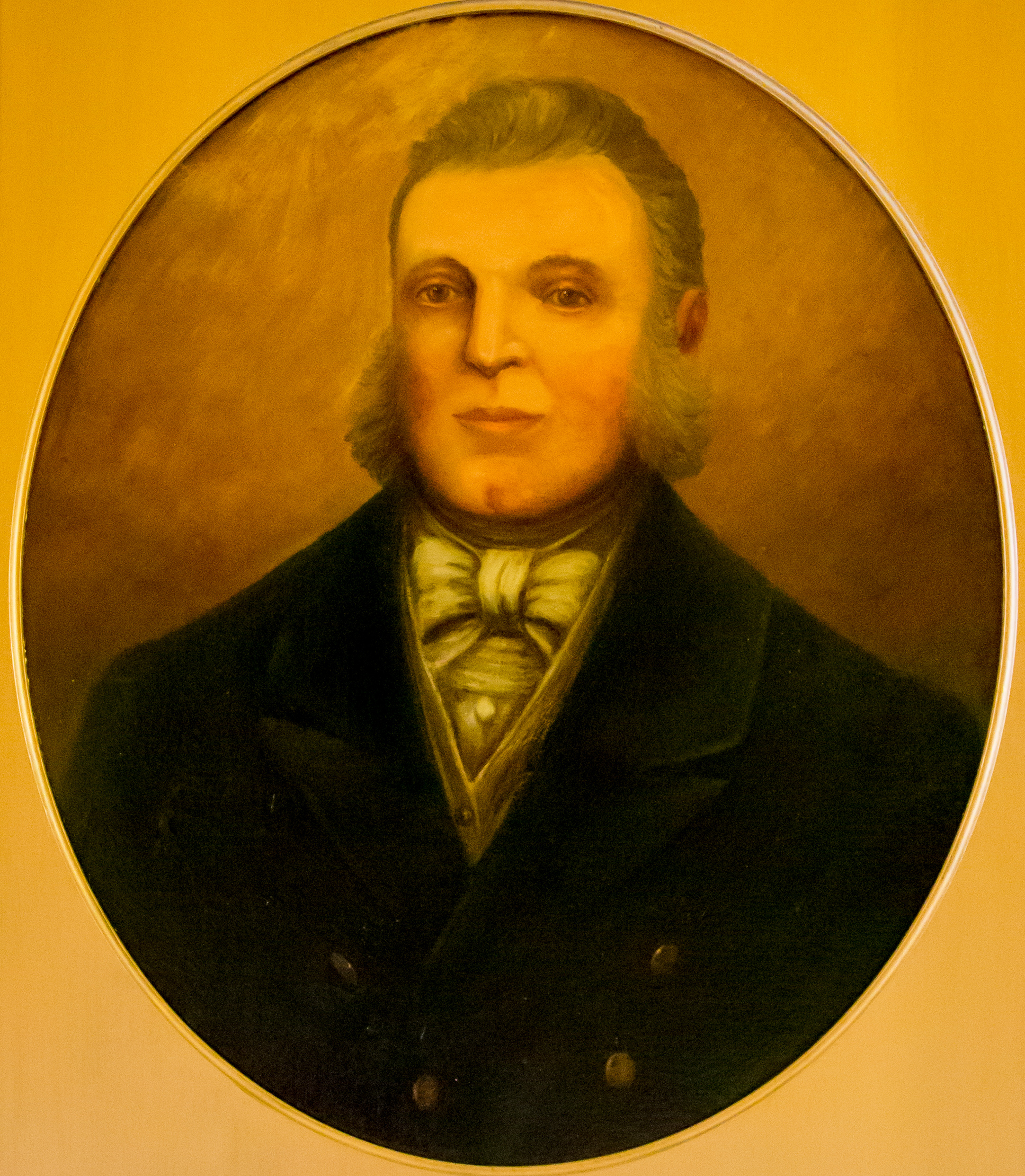
| Nominee | Arthur Fenner |
| Party | Anti-Federalist |
| Percentage | 100.00% |
- County results Fenner: 90–100%
Governor before election
Arthur Fenner
Anti-Federalist
Elected Governor
Arthur Fenner
Anti-Federalist

The 1793 Rhode Island gubernatorial election was held on April 3, 1793, in order to elect the governor of Rhode Island. Incumbent Anti-Federalist governor Arthur Fenner won re-election as he ran unopposed. The exact number of votes cast in this election are unknown.

== General election ==
On election day, April 3, 1793, incumbent Anti-Federalist governor Arthur Fenner won re-election as he ran unopposed, thereby retaining Anti-Federalist control over the office of governor. Fenner was sworn in for his fourth term on May 5, 1793.

=== Results ===
Rhode Island gubernatorial election, 1793
| Party | Candidate | Votes | % |
|---|---|---|---|
| Anti-Federalist | Arthur Fenner (incumbent) | | 100.00 |
| Total votes | | | 100.00 |
| Anti-Federalist hold | | | |
