= 1797 Rhode Island gubernatorial election =

- April 5, 1797
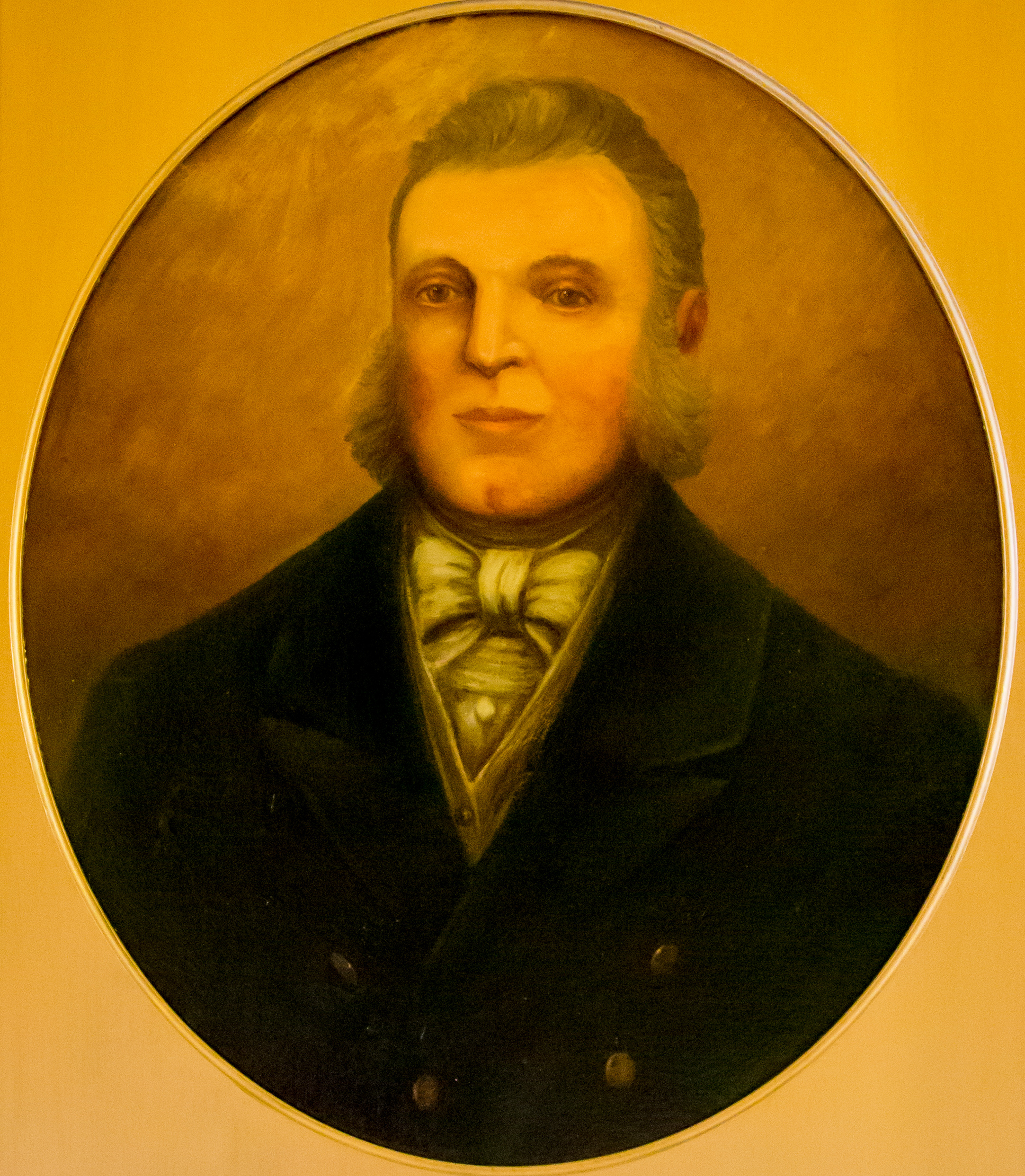
Nominee	Arthur Fenner
Party	Democratic-Republican
Popular vote	1,204
Percentage	100.00%
- County results Fenner: 90–100%
Governor before election
Arthur Fenner
Democratic-Republican
Elected Governor
Arthur Fenner
Democratic-Republican

The 1797 Rhode Island gubernatorial election was held on April 5, 1797, in order to elect the governor of Rhode Island. Incumbent Democratic-Republican governor Arthur Fenner won re-election as he ran unopposed.

== General election ==
On election day, April 5, 1797, incumbent Democratic-Republican governor Arthur Fenner won re-election as he ran unopposed, thereby retaining Democratic-Republican control over the office of governor. Fenner was sworn in for his eight term on May 5, 1797.

=== Results ===
Rhode Island gubernatorial election, 1797
Party	Candidate	Votes	%
Democratic-Republican	Arthur Fenner (incumbent)	1,204	100.00
Total votes		1,204	100.00
Democratic-Republican hold			
