= 1778 Rhode Island gubernatorial election =

- April 1, 1778
Nominee	William Greene
Party	Independent
Percentage	100.00%
Governor before election
Nicholas Cooke
Independent
Elected Governor
William Greene
Independent

The 1778 Rhode Island gubernatorial election was held on April 1, 1778, in order to elect the governor of Rhode Island. Independent candidate and incumbent Chief Justice of the Rhode Island Supreme Court William Greene won the election as he ran unopposed. The exact number of votes cast in this election are unknown.

== General election ==
On election day, April 1, 1778, Independent candidate William Greene won the election as he ran unopposed, thereby retaining Independent control over the office of governor. Greene was sworn in as the 2nd governor of Rhode Island on May 5, 1778.

=== Results ===
Rhode Island gubernatorial election, 1778
Party	Candidate	Votes	%
Independent	William Greene		100.00
Total votes			100.00
Independent hold			
