= 1810 Rhode Island gubernatorial election =

- April 4, 1810
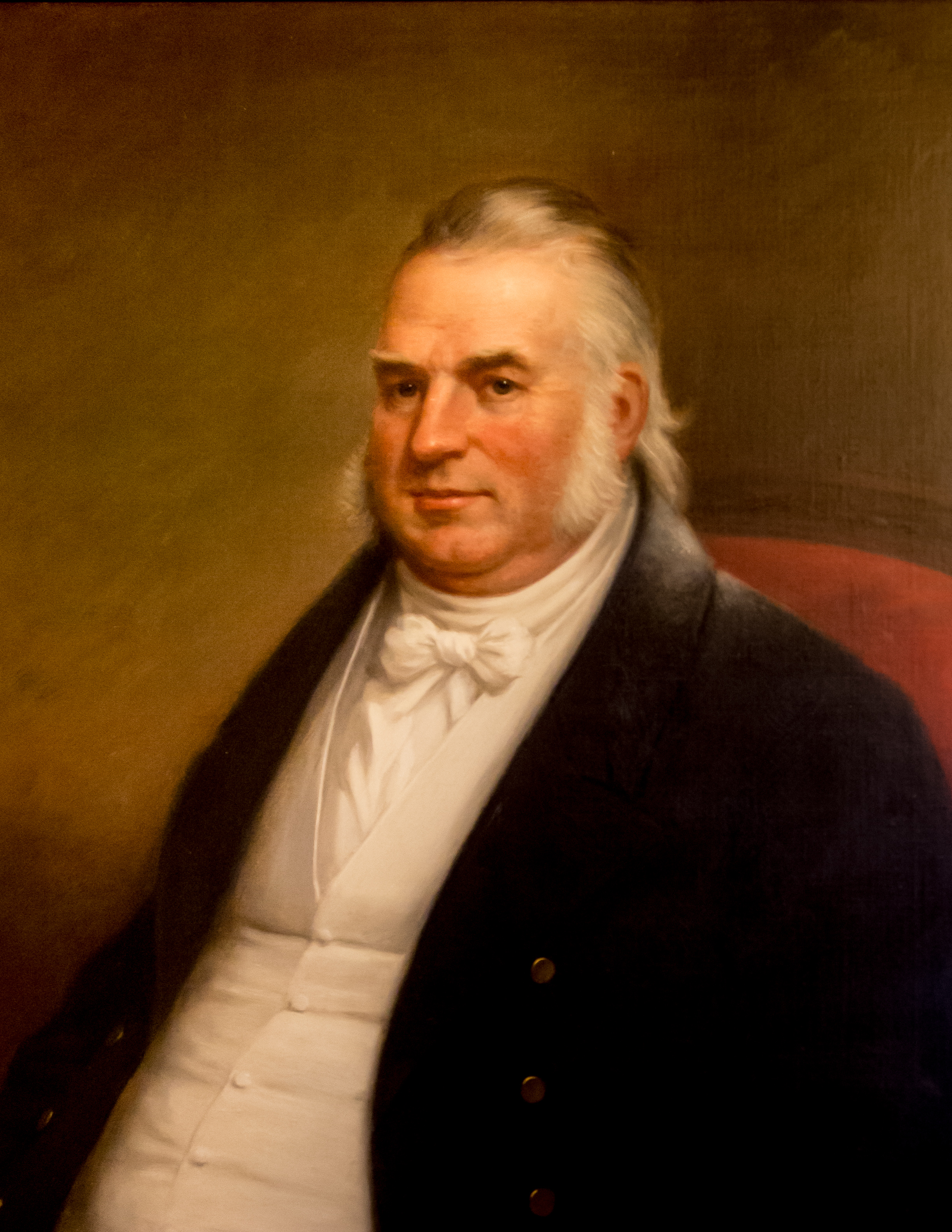
| Nominee | James Fenner |
| Party | Democratic-Republican |
| Percentage | 100.00% |
- County results Fenner: 90–100%
Governor before election
James Fenner
Democratic-Republican
Elected Governor
James Fenner
Democratic-Republican

The 1810 Rhode Island gubernatorial election was held on April 4, 1810, in order to elect the governor of Rhode Island. Incumbent Democratic-Republican governor James Fenner won re-election as he ran unopposed. The exact number of votes cast in this election are unknown.

== General election ==
On election day, April 4, 1810, incumbent Democratic-Republican governor James Fenner won re-election as he ran unopposed, thereby retaining Democratic-Republican control over the office of governor. Fenner was sworn in for his fourth term on May 1, 1810.

=== Results ===
Rhode Island gubernatorial election, 1810
| Party | Candidate | Votes | % |
|---|---|---|---|
| Democratic-Republican | James Fenner (incumbent) | | 100.00 |
| Total votes | | | 100.00 |
| Democratic-Republican hold | | | |
