= 1781 Rhode Island gubernatorial election =

- April 4, 1781
Nominee	William Greene
Party	Independent
Percentage	100.00%
Governor before election
William Greene
Independent
Elected Governor
William Greene
Independent

The 1781 Rhode Island gubernatorial election was held on April 4, 1781, in order to elect the governor of Rhode Island. Incumbent Independent governor William Greene won re-election as he ran unopposed. The exact number of votes cast in this election are unknown.

== General election ==
On election day, April 4, 1781, incumbent Independent governor William Greene won re-election as he ran unopposed, thereby retaining Independent control over the office of governor. Greene was sworn in for his fourth term on May 5, 1781.

=== Results ===
Rhode Island gubernatorial election, 1781
Party	Candidate	Votes	%
Independent	William Greene (incumbent)		100.00
Total votes			100.00
Independent hold			
