= 1788 Rhode Island gubernatorial election =

- April 2, 1788
Nominee	John Collins
Party	Independent
Percentage	100.00%
Governor before election
John Collins
Independent
Elected Governor
John Collins
Independent

The 1788 Rhode Island gubernatorial election was held on April 2, 1788, in order to elect the governor of Rhode Island. Incumbent Independent governor John Collins won the election as he ran unopposed. The exact number of votes cast in this election are unknown.

== General election ==
On election day, April 2, 1788, incumbent Independent governor John Collins won the election as he ran unopposed, thereby retaining Independent control over the office of governor. Collins was sworn in for his third term on May 5, 1788.

=== Results ===
Rhode Island gubernatorial election, 1788
Party	Candidate	Votes	%
Independent	John Collins (incumbent)		100.00
Total votes			100.00
Independent hold			
