= 1831 Rhode Island gubernatorial election =

- April 6, 1831
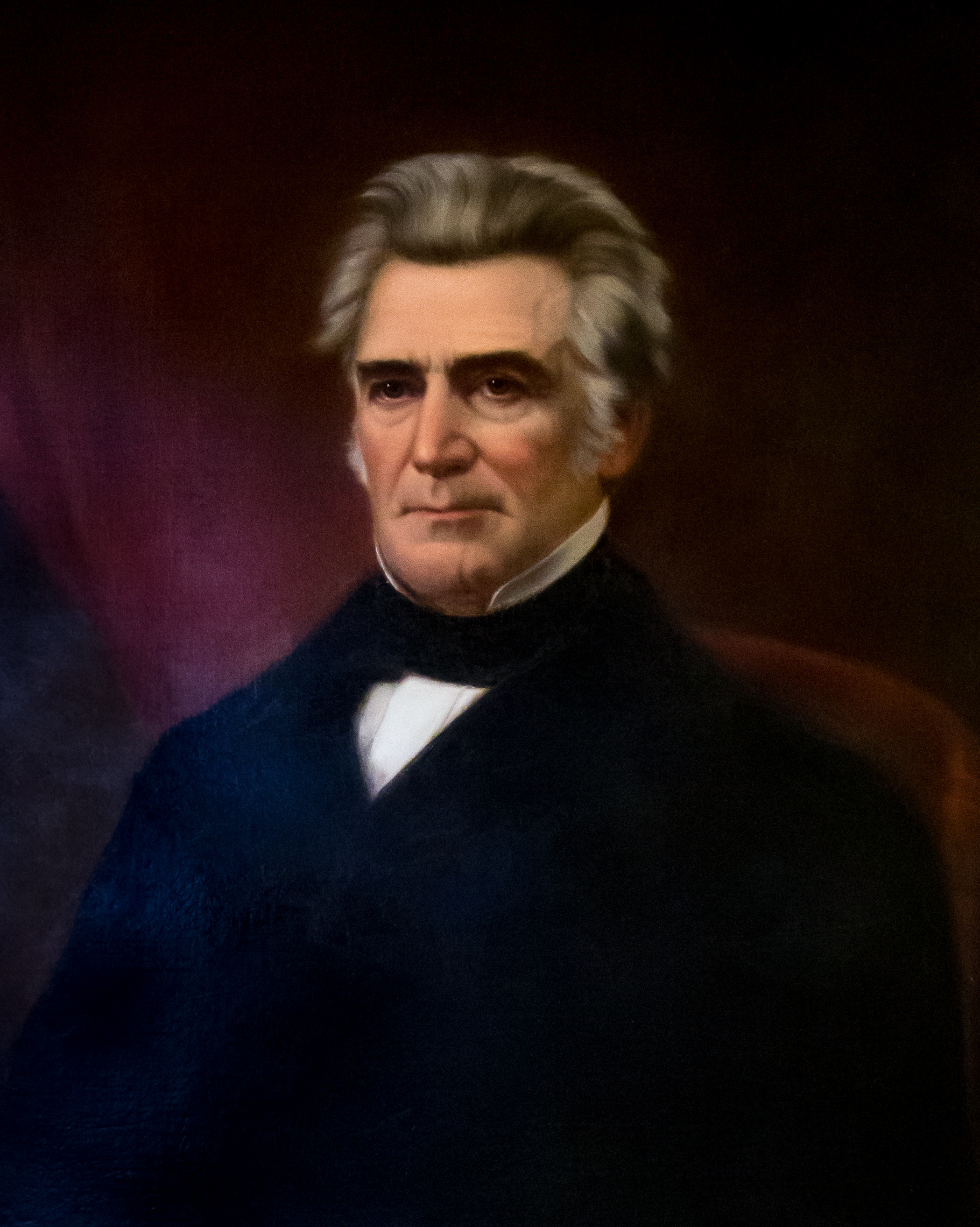

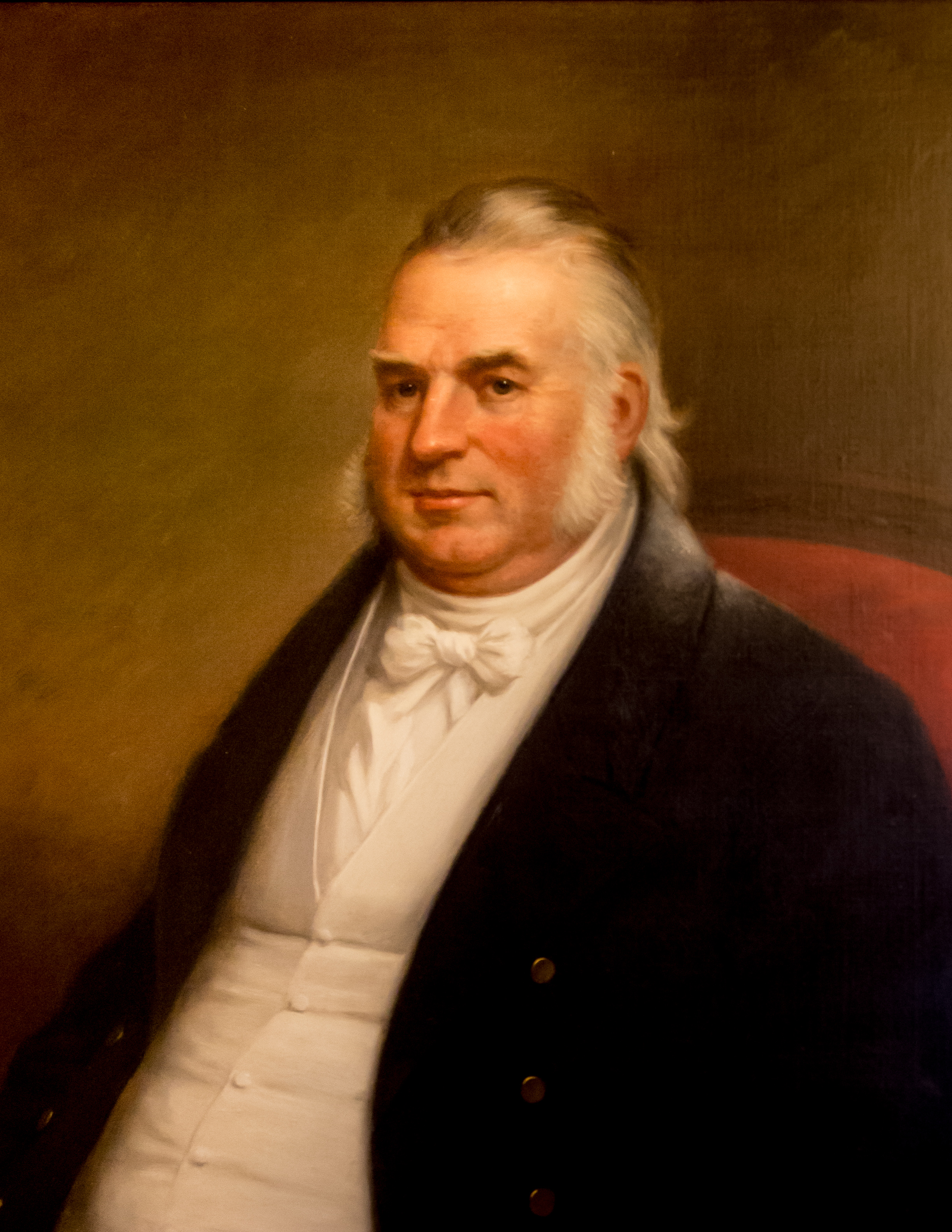
Nominee	Lemuel H. Arnold	James Fenner
Party	National Republican	Democratic-Republican
Popular vote	3,780	2,877
Percentage	56.71%	43.17%
- County results Arnold: 50–60% 60–70% Fenner: 60–70%
Governor before election
James Fenner
Democratic-Republican
Elected Governor
Lemuel H. Arnold
National Republican

The 1831 Rhode Island gubernatorial election was held on April 6, 1831, in order to elect the governor of Rhode Island. National Republican nominee and incumbent member of the Rhode Island House of Representatives Lemuel H. Arnold defeated incumbent Democratic-Republican governor James Fenner.

== General election ==
On election day, April 6, 1831, National Republican nominee Lemuel H. Arnold won the election by a margin of 903 votes against his opponent incumbent Democratic-Republican governor James Fenner, thereby gaining National Republican control over the office of governor. Arnold was sworn in as the 12th governor of Rhode Island on May 4, 1831.

=== Results ===
Rhode Island gubernatorial election, 1831
Party	Candidate	Votes	%
National Republican	Lemuel H. Arnold	3,780	56.71
Democratic-Republican	James Fenner (incumbent)	2,877	43.17
	Scattering	8	0.12
Total votes		6,665	100.00
National Republican gain from Democratic-Republican			
