= 1813 Rhode Island gubernatorial election =

- April 7, 1813
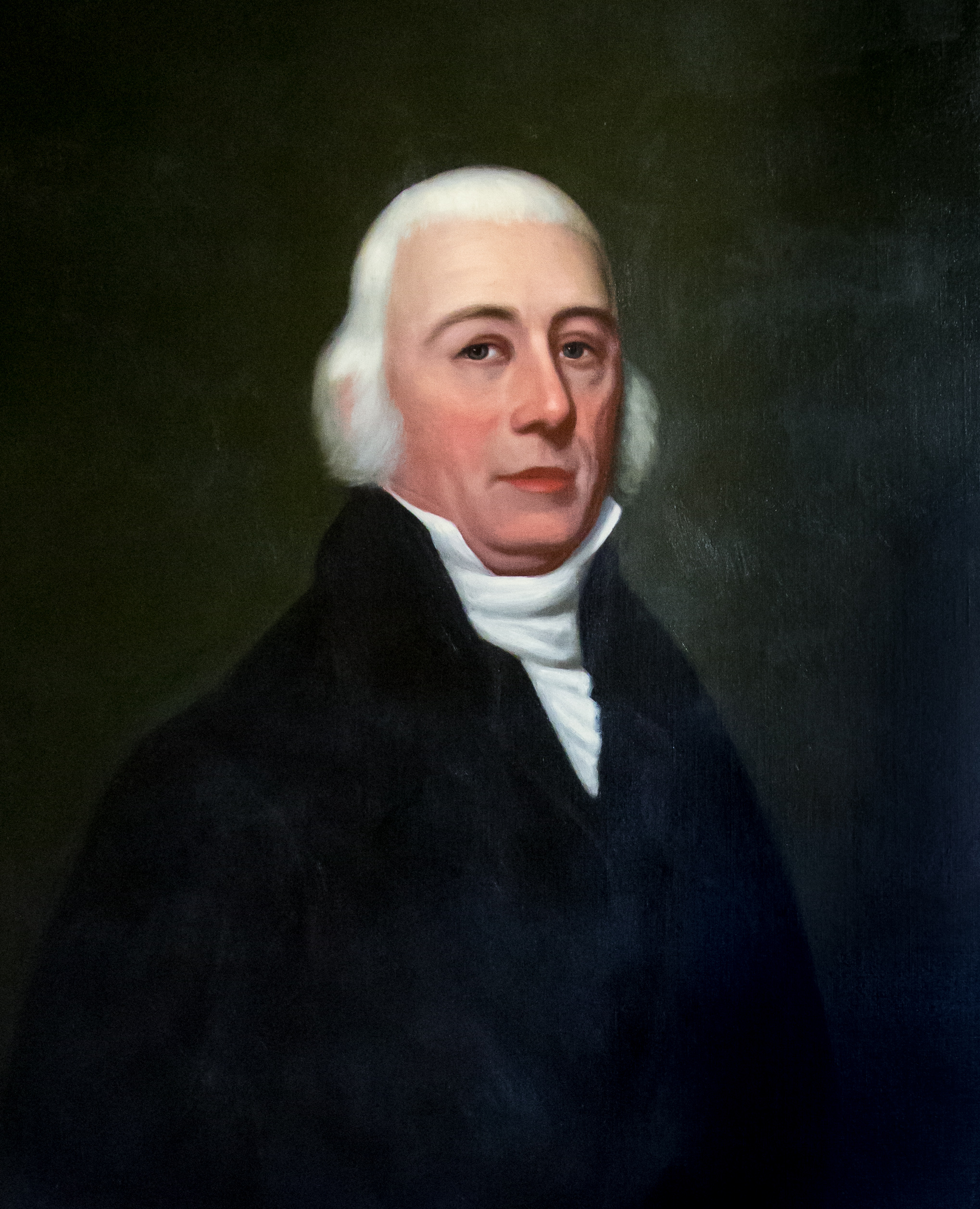
Nominee	William Jones
Party	Federalist
Popular vote	3,350
Percentage	100.00%
- County results Jones: 90–100%
Governor before election
William Jones
Federalist
Elected Governor
William Jones
Federalist

The 1813 Rhode Island gubernatorial election was held on April 7, 1813, in order to elect the governor of Rhode Island. Incumbent Federalist governor William Jones won re-election as he ran unopposed.

== General election ==
On election day, April 7, 1813, incumbent Federalist governor William Jones won re-election as he ran unopposed, thereby retaining Federalist control over the office of governor. Jones was sworn in for his third term on May 7, 1813.

=== Results ===
Rhode Island gubernatorial election, 1813
Party	Candidate	Votes	%
Federalist	William Jones (incumbent)	3,350	100.00
Total votes		3,350	100.00
Federalist hold			
