= 1792 Rhode Island gubernatorial election =

- April 4, 1792
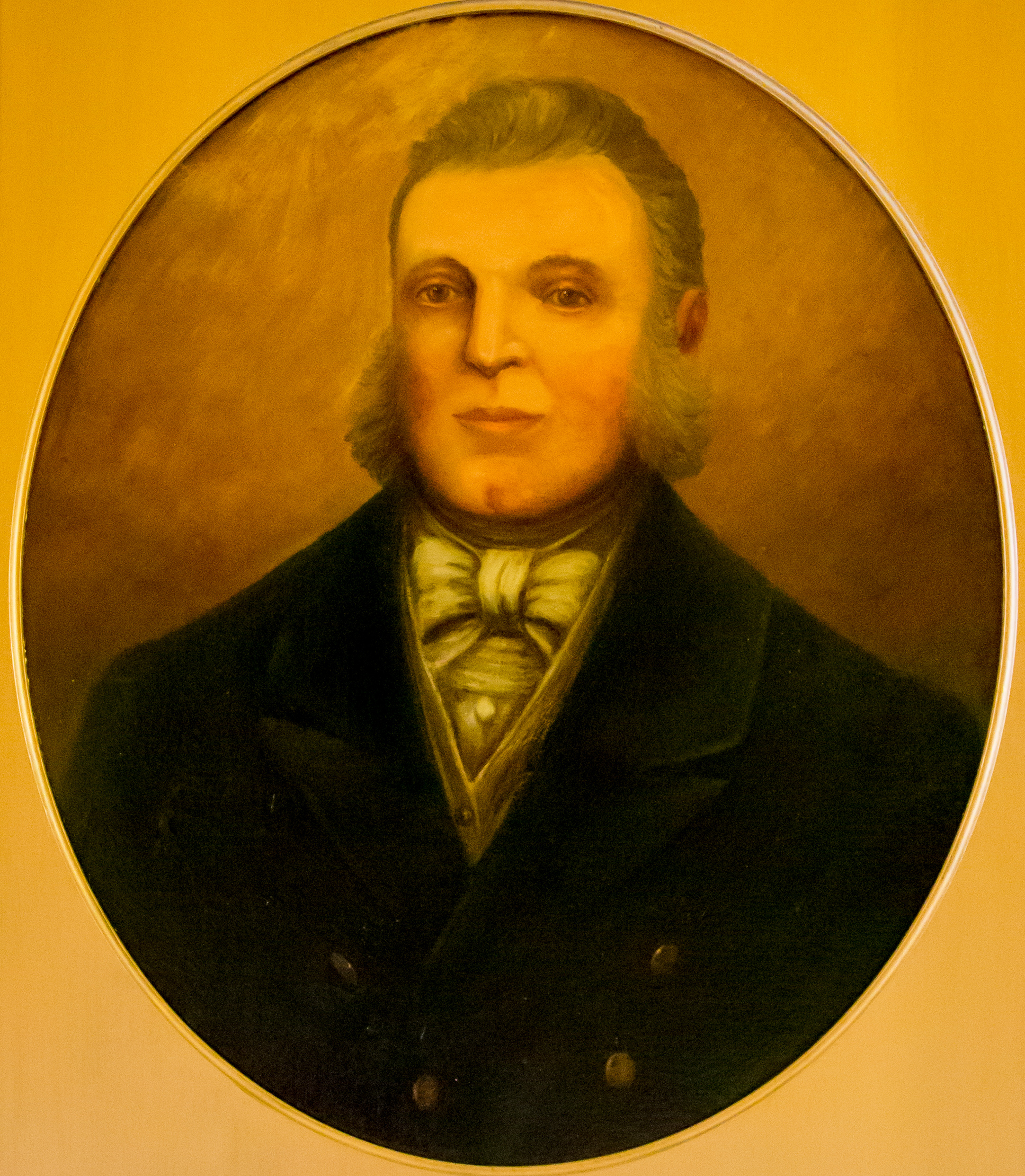
Nominee	Arthur Fenner
Party	Anti-Federalist
Percentage	100.00%
- County results Fenner: 90–100%
Governor before election
Arthur Fenner
Anti-Federalist
Elected Governor
Arthur Fenner
Anti-Federalist

The 1792 Rhode Island gubernatorial election was held on April 4, 1792, in order to elect the governor of Rhode Island. Incumbent Anti-Federalist governor Arthur Fenner won re-election as he ran unopposed. The exact number of votes cast in this election are unknown.

== General election ==
On election day, April 4, 1792, incumbent Anti-Federalist governor Arthur Fenner won re-election as he ran unopposed, thereby retaining Anti-Federalist control over the office of governor. Fenner was sworn in for his third term on May 5, 1792.

=== Results ===
Rhode Island gubernatorial election, 1792
Party	Candidate	Votes	%
Anti-Federalist	Arthur Fenner (incumbent)		100.00
Total votes			100.00
Anti-Federalist hold			
