= 1809 Rhode Island gubernatorial election =

- April 5, 1809
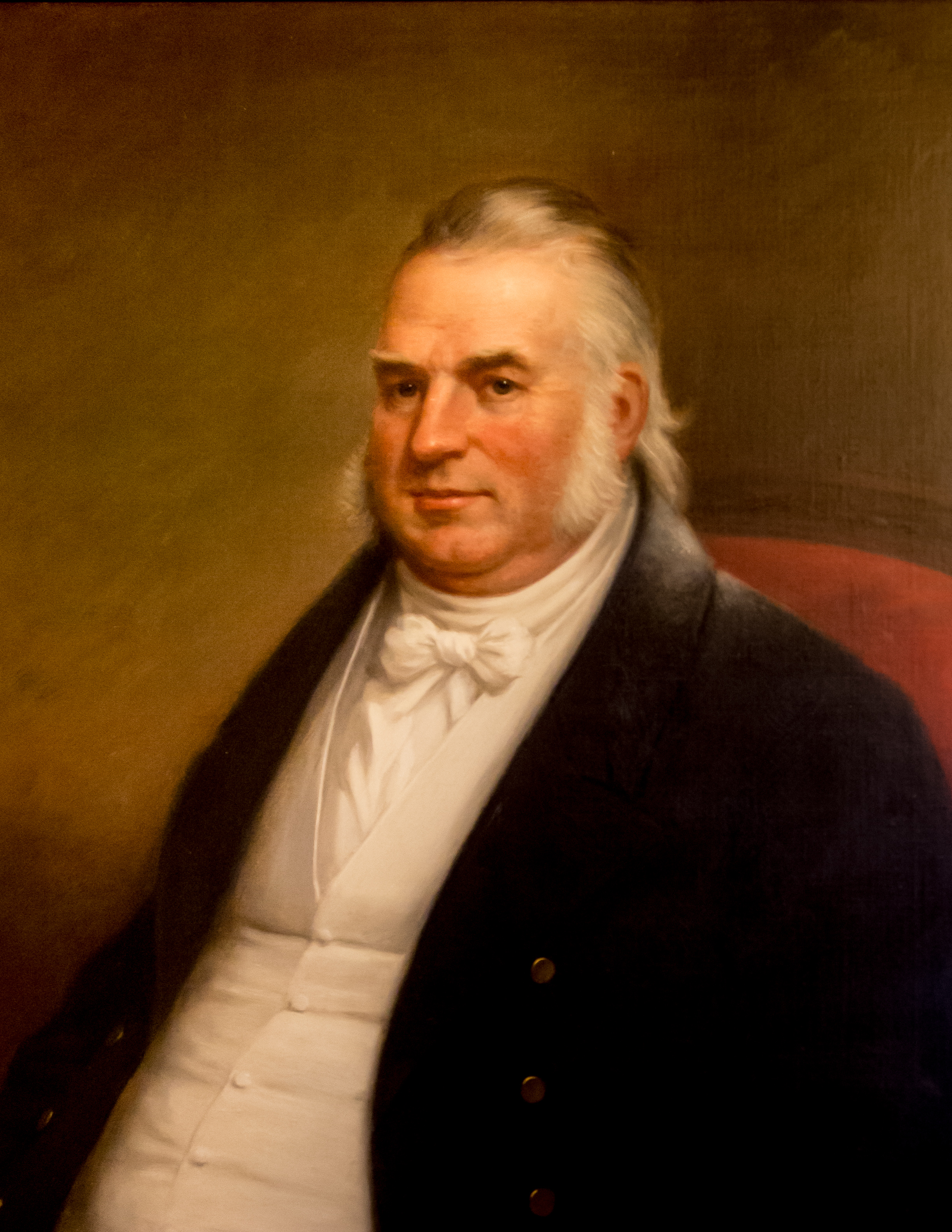
Nominee	James Fenner
Party	Democratic-Republican
Alliance	Federalist
Percentage	100.00%
- County results Fenner: 90–100%
Governor before election
James Fenner
Democratic-Republican
Elected Governor
James Fenner
Democratic-Republican

The 1809 Rhode Island gubernatorial election was held on April 5, 1809, in order to elect the governor of Rhode Island. Incumbent Democratic-Republican governor James Fenner won re-election as he ran unopposed. The exact number of votes cast in this election are unknown.

== General election ==
On election day, April 5, 1809, incumbent Democratic-Republican governor James Fenner won re-election as he ran unopposed, thereby retaining Democratic-Republican control over the office of governor. Fenner was sworn in for his third term on May 1, 1809.

=== Results ===
Rhode Island gubernatorial election, 1809
Party	Candidate	Votes	%
Democratic-Republican	James Fenner (incumbent)		100.00
Total votes			100.00
Democratic-Republican hold			
