= 1833 Rhode Island gubernatorial election =

- April 3, 1833
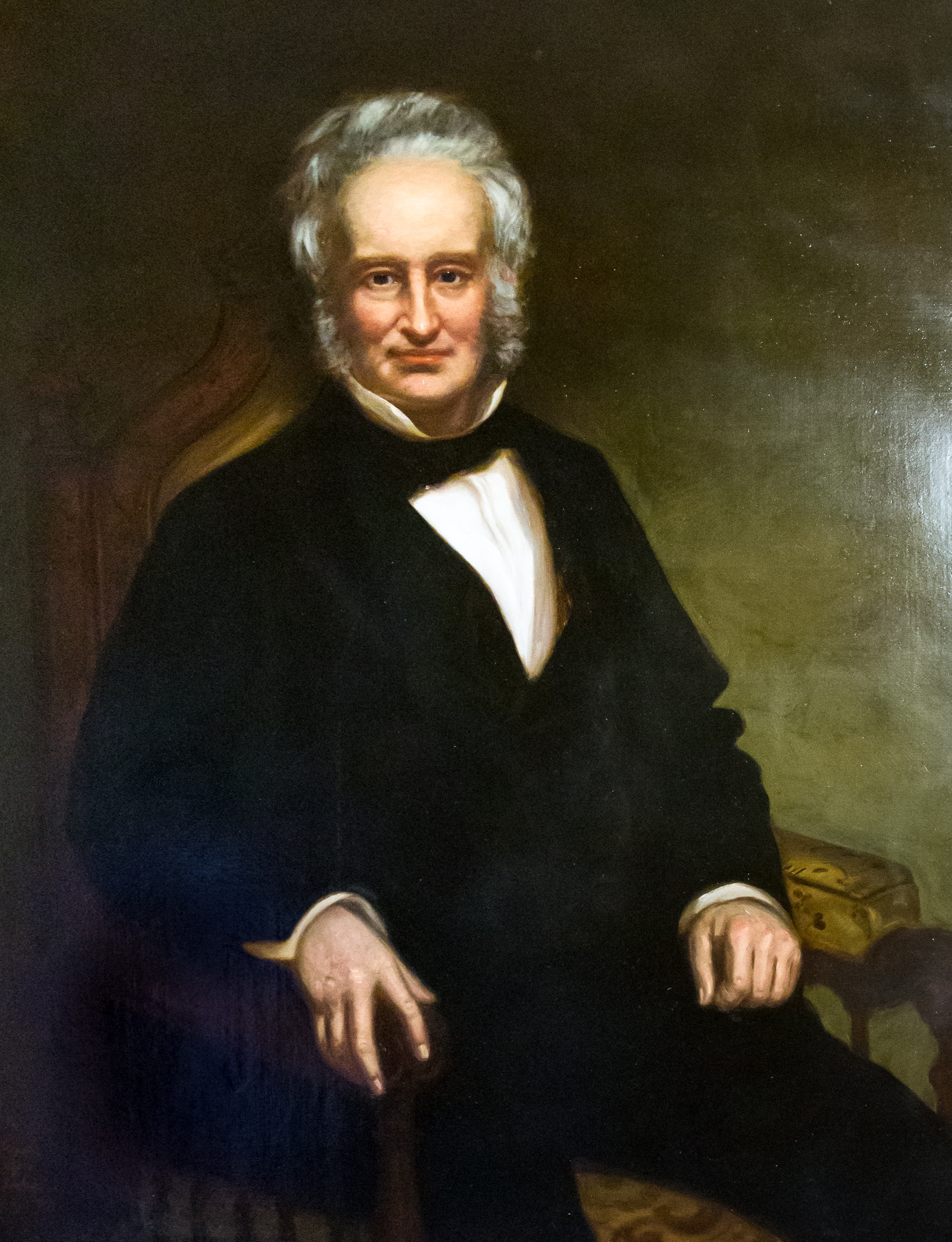

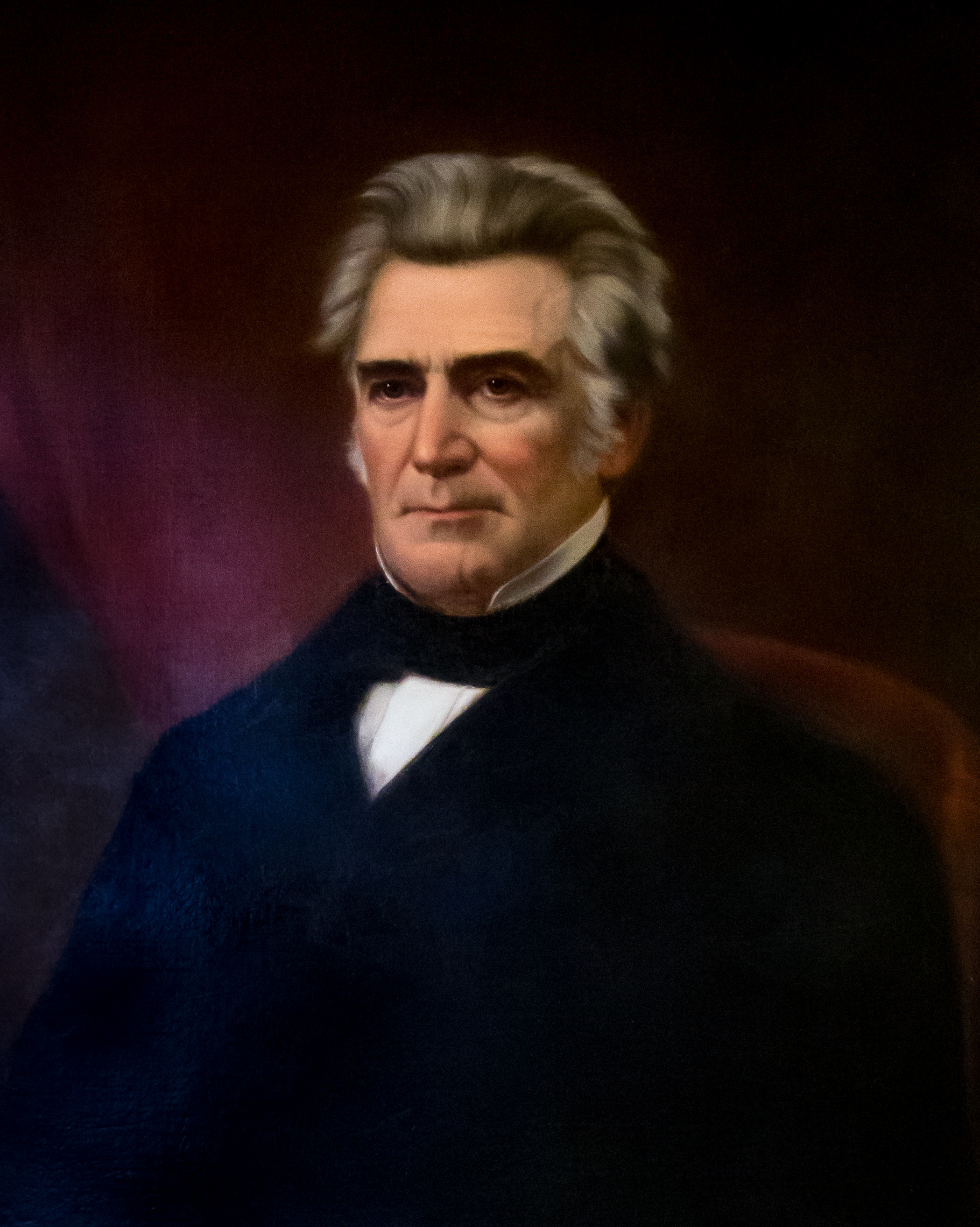
Nominee	John Brown Francis	Lemuel H. Arnold
Party	Democratic	National Republican
Popular vote	4,025	3,292
Percentage	54.98%	44.97%
- County results Francis: 50–60% 60–70% 70–80% Arnold: 50–60%
Governor before election
Lemuel H. Arnold
National Republican
Elected Governor
John Brown Francis
Democratic

The 1833 Rhode Island gubernatorial election was held on April 3, 1833, in order to elect the governor of Rhode Island. Democratic nominee and former member of the Rhode Island Senate John Brown Francis defeated incumbent National Republican governor Lemuel H. Arnold.

== General election ==
On election day, April 3, 1833, Democratic nominee John Brown Francis won the election by a margin of 733 votes against his opponent incumbent National Republican governor Lemuel H. Arnold, thereby gaining Democratic control over the office of governor. Francis was sworn in as the 13th governor of Rhode Island on May 1, 1833.

=== Results ===
Rhode Island gubernatorial election, 1833
Party	Candidate	Votes	%
Democratic	John Brown Francis	4,025	54.98
National Republican	Lemuel H. Arnold (incumbent)	3,292	44.97
	Scattering	4	0.05
Total votes		7,321	100.00
Democratic gain from National Republican			
