= Edward Wilcox (politician) =

American politician

Edward Wilcox (1751–1838) was an American politician who was Lieutenant governor of Rhode Island from 1817 to 1821. He briefly served as governor of Rhode Island following the resignation of Nehemiah R. Knight on January 9, 1821, until his successor took office on May 2, 1821.

Wilcox was born in Charlestown, Rhode Island, son of Joseph Wilcox (1730–1804) and Mary (Burdick) Wilcox (1728–1794). He served as a major in the Washington County militia from 1795 to 1800. In 1811 he purchased the Joseph Stanton House in Charlestown from Joseph Stanton, Jr. and by 1817 it was operating as a tavern. Wilcox served as lieutenant governor of Rhode Island from 1817 to 1821, under governor Nehemiah R. Knight.

Wilcox later served as president of the Phenix Bank.

Wilcox married Hannah Babcock; they had at least two children - Ann (1790–1849) and Joseph. Wilcox is buried in the Wilcox Lot in Charlestown.
