= 1787 Rhode Island gubernatorial election =

- April 4, 1787

Nominee	John Collins	William Bradford
Popular vote	2,969	1,141
Percentage	72.24%	27.76%
Governor before election
John Collins
Elected Governor
John Collins

The 1787 Rhode Island gubernatorial election was an election held on April 4, 1787, to elect the governor of Rhode Island. John Collins beat William Bradford with 72.24% of the vote.

== General election ==
=== Candidates ===
- John Collins, incumbent governor since 1786.
- William Bradford, deputy governor from 1775 to 1778.

=== Results ===
1787 Rhode Island gubernatorial election
Party	Candidate	Votes	%	±%
Unknown	John Collins (incumbent)	2,969	72.24%	
Unknown	William Bradford	1,141	27.76%	
Majority		1,828	44.48%	
