= 1837 Maryland gubernatorial election =

- January 2, 1837
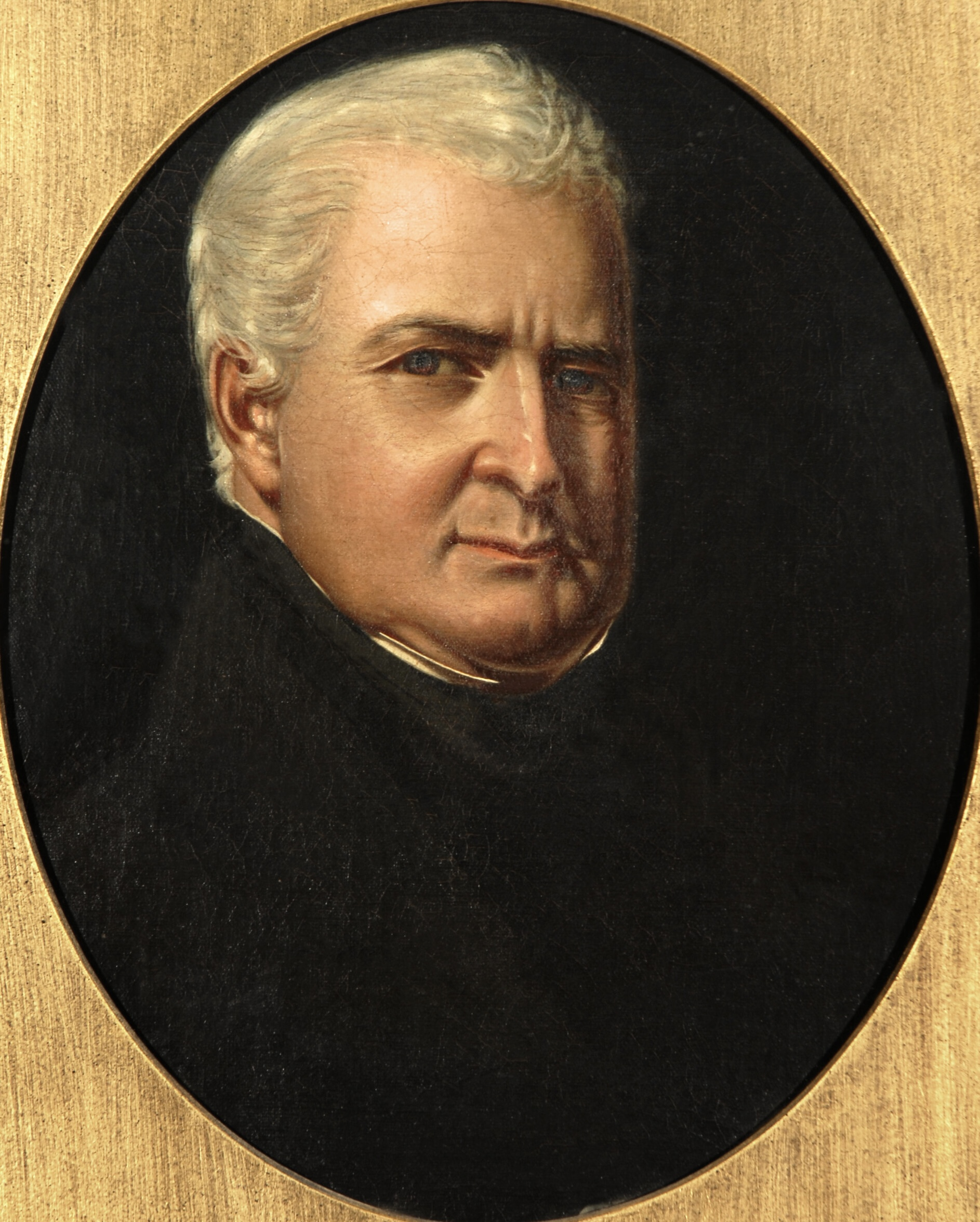
Nominee	Thomas Veazey
Party	Whig
Popular vote	70
Percentage	86.42%
Governor before election
Thomas Veazey
Whig
Elected Governor
Thomas Veazey
Whig

The 1837 Maryland gubernatorial election was held on January 2, 1837, in order to elect the governor of Maryland. Incumbent Whig governor Thomas Veazey was re-elected by the Maryland General Assembly as he ran unopposed.

== General election ==
On election day, January 2, 1837, incumbent Whig governor Thomas Veazey was re-elected by the Maryland General Assembly, thereby retaining Whig control over the office of governor. Veazey was sworn in for his second term on January 19, 1837.

=== Results ===
Maryland gubernatorial election, 1837
Party	Candidate	Votes	%
Whig	Thomas Veazey (incumbent)	70	86.42
	Did Not Vote	9	11.11
	Scattering	2	2.47
Total votes		81	100.00
Whig hold			
