= 1847 Maryland gubernatorial election =

- October 6, 1847
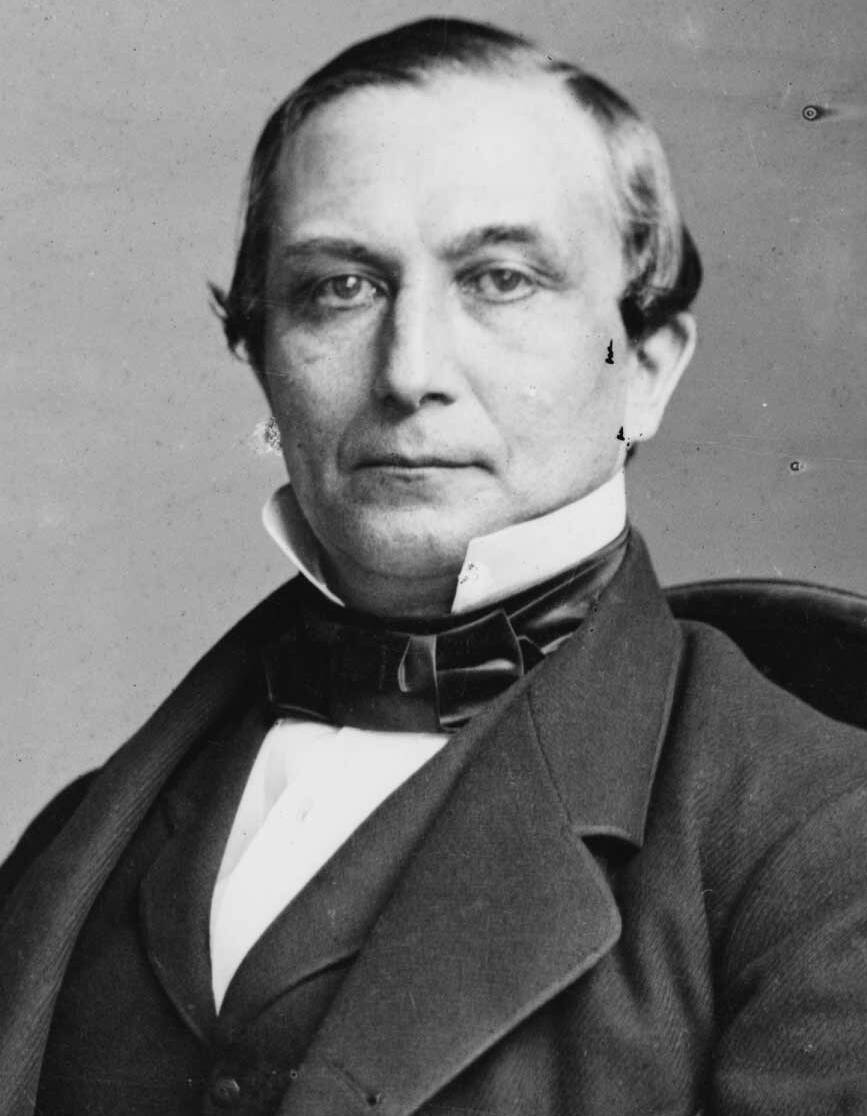

Nominee	Philip Francis Thomas	William Tilghman Goldsborough
Party	Democratic	Whig
Popular vote	34,388	33,676
Percentage	50.52%	49.48%
- County results Thomas: 50–60% Goldsborough: 50–60% 60–70%
Governor before election
Thomas Pratt
Whig
Elected Governor
Philip Francis Thomas
Democratic

The 1847 Maryland gubernatorial election was held on October 6, 1847, in order to elect the Governor of Maryland. Democratic nominee and former member of the U.S. House of Representatives from Maryland's 2nd district Philip Francis Thomas narrowly defeated Whig nominee William Tilghman Goldsborough.

== General election ==
On election day, October 6, 1847, Democratic nominee Philip Francis Thomas won the election by a margin of 712 votes against his opponent Whig nominee William Tilghman Goldsborough, thereby gaining Democratic control over the office of governor. Thomas was sworn in as the 28th Governor of Maryland on January 3, 1848.

=== Results ===
Maryland gubernatorial election, 1847
Party	Candidate	Votes	%
Democratic	Philip Francis Thomas	34,388	50.52
Whig	William Tilghman Goldsborough	33,676	49.48
Total votes		68,064	100.00
Democratic gain from Whig			
