= 1797 Maryland gubernatorial election =

- November 13, 1797
Nominee	John Henry
Party	Federalist
Popular vote	1
Percentage	100.00%
Governor before election
John Hoskins Stone
Federalist
Elected Governor
John Henry
Federalist

The 1797 Maryland gubernatorial election was held on November 13, 1797, in order to elect the Governor of Maryland. Federalist candidate and incumbent United States Senator John Henry was easily elected by the Maryland General Assembly as he ran unopposed. The exact results of this election are unknown.

== General election ==
On election day, November 13, 1797, Federalist candidate John Henry was elected by the Maryland General Assembly, thereby retaining Federalist control over the office of governor. Henry was sworn in as the 8th Governor of Maryland on November 17, 1797.

=== Results ===
Maryland gubernatorial election, 1797
Party	Candidate	Votes	%
Federalist	John Henry	1	100.00
Total votes		1	100.00
Federalist hold			
