= 1786 Maryland gubernatorial election =

- November 30, 1786
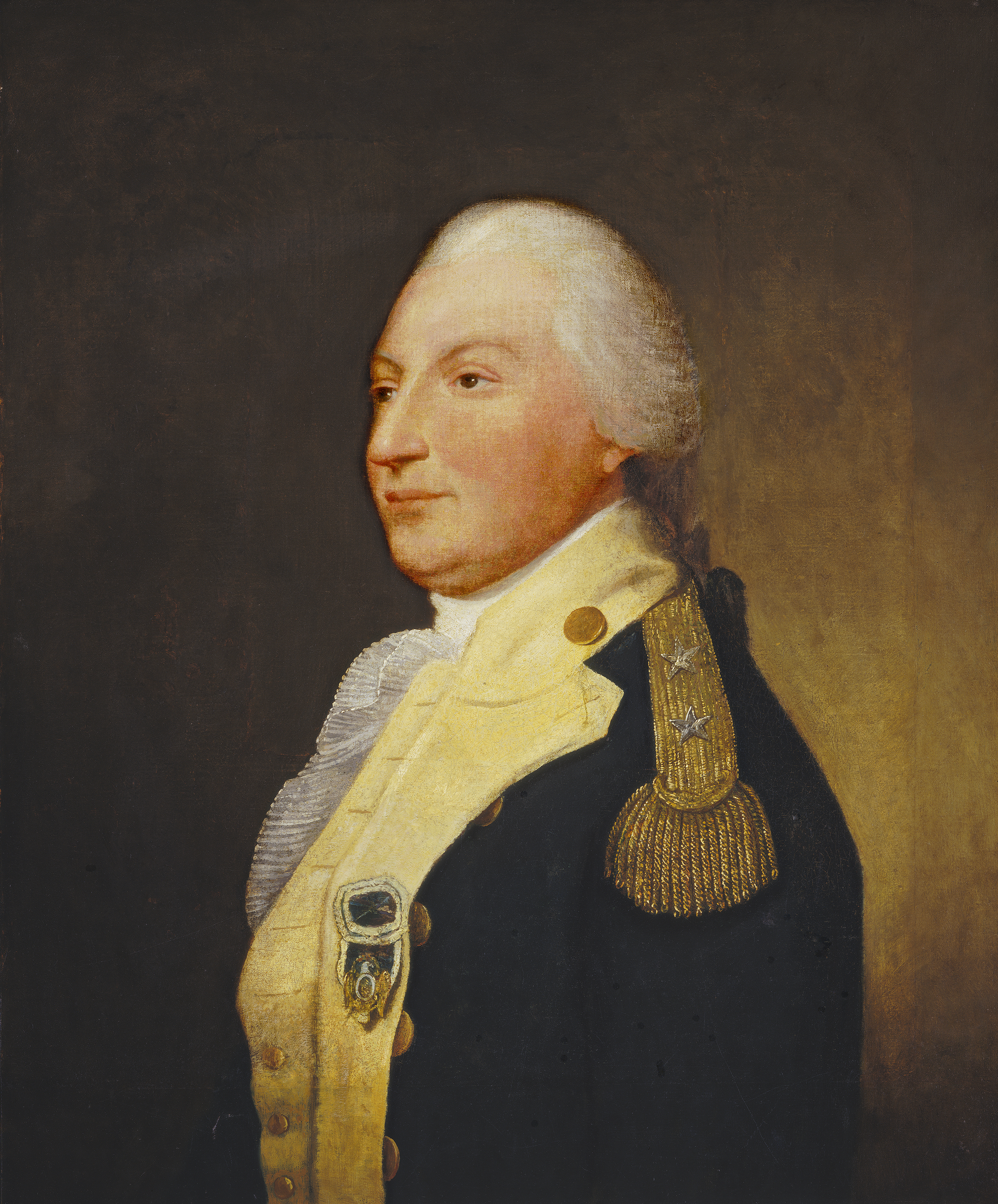
Nominee	William Smallwood
Party	Nonpartisan
Popular vote	1
Percentage	100.00%
Governor before election
William Smallwood
Nonpartisan
Elected Governor
William Smallwood
Nonpartisan

The 1786 Maryland gubernatorial election was held on November 30, 1786, in order to elect the Governor of Maryland. Incumbent Governor William Smallwood was easily re-elected by the Maryland General Assembly as he ran unopposed. The exact results of this election are unknown.

== General election ==
On election day, November 30, 1786, William Smallwood was re-elected by the Maryland General Assembly. Smallwood was sworn in for his second term on November 30, 1786.

=== Results ===
Maryland gubernatorial election, 1786
Party	Candidate	Votes	%
Nonpartisan	William Smallwood (incumbent)	1	100.00
Total votes		1	100.00
Nonpartisan hold			
