= 1783 Maryland gubernatorial election =

- November 22, 1783
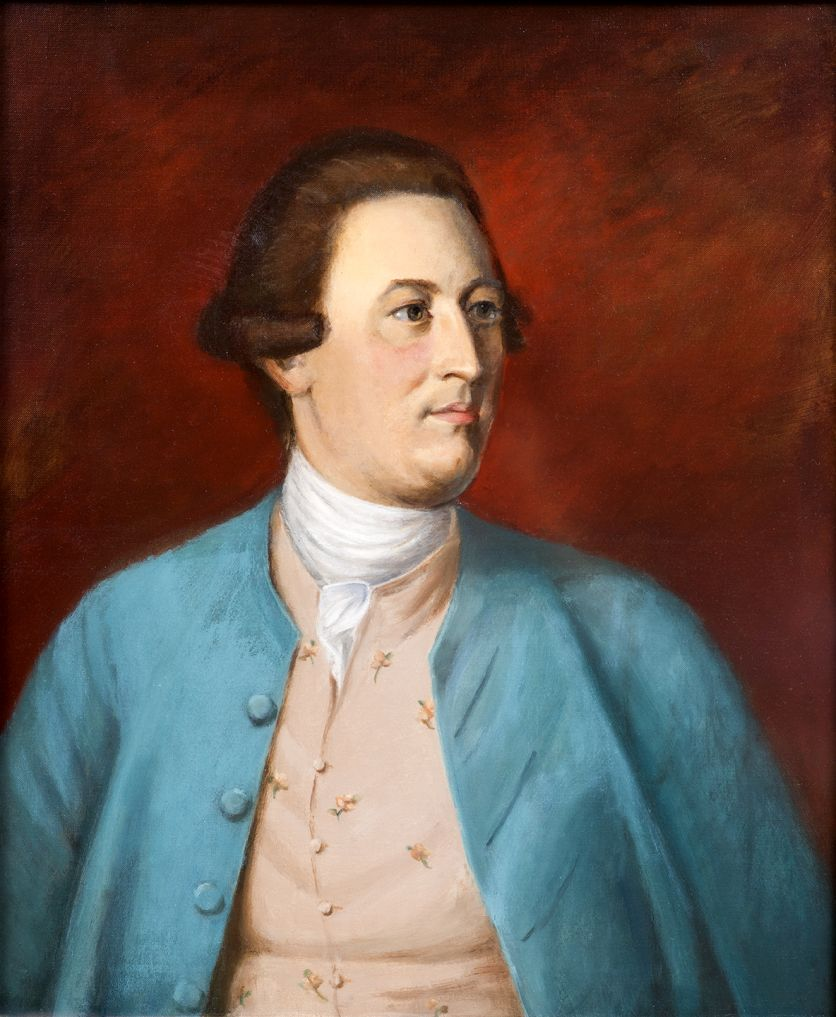
Nominee	William Paca
Party	Nonpartisan
Popular vote	1
Percentage	100.00%
Governor before election
William Paca
Nonpartisan
Elected Governor
William Paca
Nonpartisan

The 1783 Maryland gubernatorial election was held on November 22, 1783, in order to elect the Governor of Maryland. Incumbent Governor William Paca was easily re-elected by the Maryland General Assembly as he ran unopposed. The exact results of this election are unknown.

== General election ==
On election day, November 22, 1783, William Paca was re-elected by the Maryland General Assembly. Paca was sworn in for his second term on November 22, 1783.

=== Results ===
Maryland gubernatorial election, 1783
Party	Candidate	Votes	%
Nonpartisan	William Paca (incumbent)	1	100.00
Total votes		1	100.00
Nonpartisan hold			
