= 1822 Maryland gubernatorial election =

- December 9, 1822
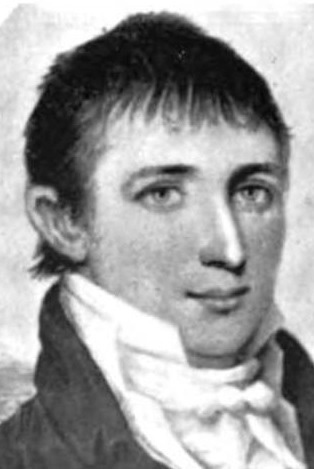

Nominee	Samuel Stevens Jr.	James B. Robins
Party	Democratic-Republican	Federalist
Popular vote	63	16
Percentage	79.75%	20.25%
Governor before election
Samuel Sprigg
Democratic-Republican
Elected Governor
Samuel Stevens Jr.
Democratic-Republican

The 1822 Maryland gubernatorial election was held on December 9, 1822, in order to elect the Governor of Maryland. Democratic-Republican nominee and former member of the Maryland House of Delegates Samuel Stevens Jr. was elected by the Maryland General Assembly against Federalist nominee James B. Robins.

== General election ==
On election day, December 9, 1822, Democratic-Republican nominee Samuel Stevens Jr. was elected by the Maryland General Assembly, thereby retaining Democratic-Republican control over the office of governor. Stevens was sworn in as the 18th Governor of Maryland on December 16, 1822.

=== Results ===
Maryland gubernatorial election, 1822
Party	Candidate	Votes	%
Democratic-Republican	Samuel Stevens Jr.	63	79.75
Federalist	James B. Robins	16	20.25
Total votes		79	100.00
Democratic-Republican hold			
