= 1841 Maryland gubernatorial election =

- October 6, 1841
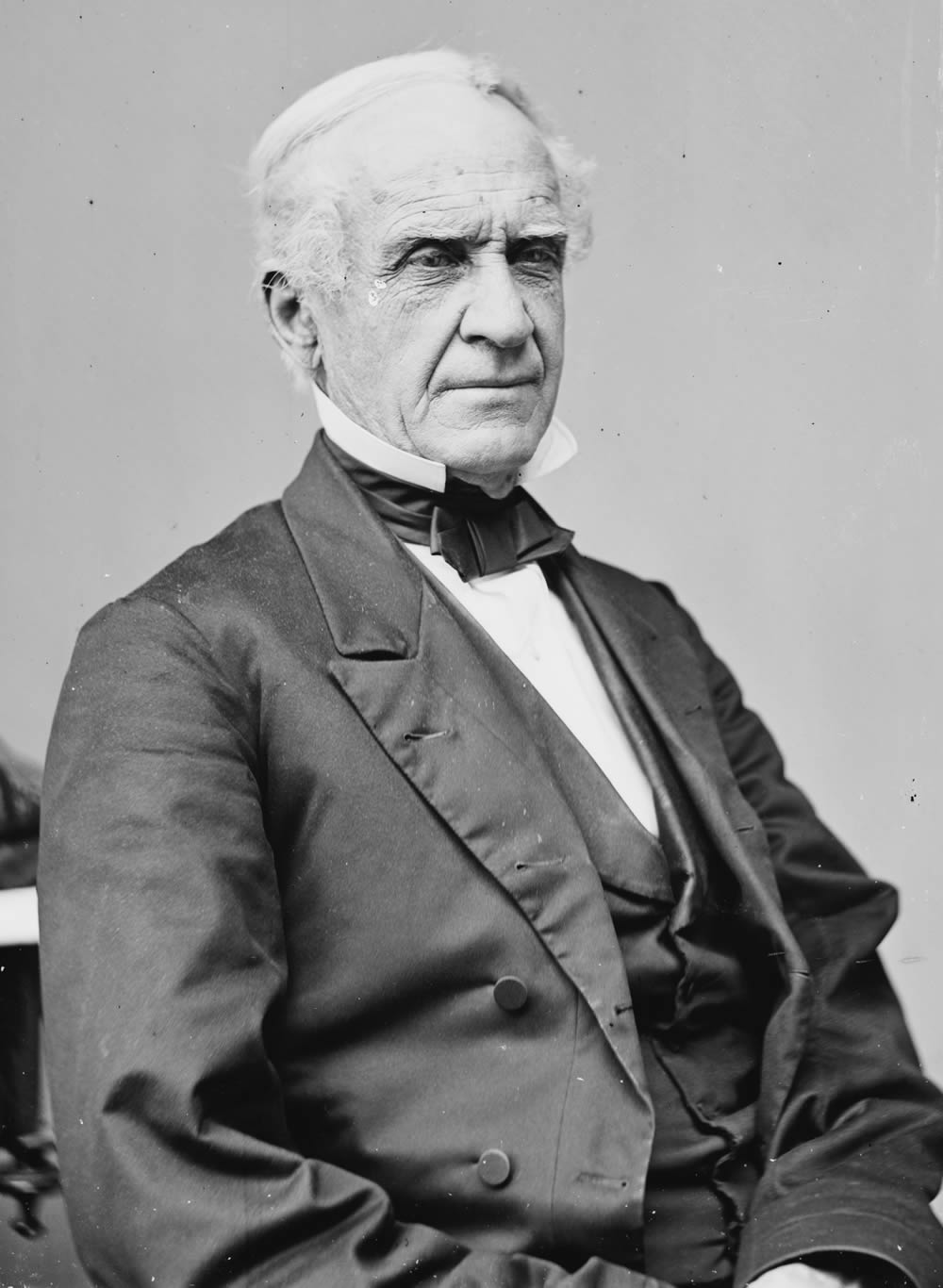

Nominee	Francis Thomas	William Cost Johnson
Party	Democratic	Whig
Popular vote	28,959	28,320
Percentage	50.56%	49.44%
- County results Thomas: 50–60% Johnson: 50–60% 60–70%
Governor before election
William Grason
Democratic
Elected Governor
Francis Thomas
Democratic

The 1841 Maryland gubernatorial election was held on October 6, 1841, in order to elect the Governor of Maryland. Democratic nominee and former member of the U.S. House of Representatives from Maryland's 6th district Francis Thomas narrowly defeated Whig nominee and incumbent member of the U.S. House of Representatives from Maryland's 5th district William Cost Johnson.

== General election ==
On election day, October 6, 1841, Democratic nominee Francis Thomas won the election by a margin of 639 votes against his opponent Whig nominee William Cost Johnson, thereby retaining Democratic control over the office of governor. Thomas was sworn in as the 26th Governor of Maryland on January 3, 1842.

=== Results ===
Maryland gubernatorial election, 1841
Party	Candidate	Votes	%
Democratic	Francis Thomas	28,959	50.56
Whig	William Cost Johnson	28,320	49.44
Total votes		57,279	100.00
Democratic hold			
