= 1826 Maryland gubernatorial election =

- January 2, 1826
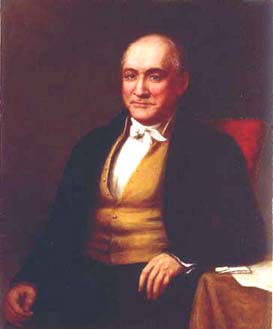

Nominee	Joseph Kent	William Tyler
Party	Democratic-Republican
Popular vote	59	30
Percentage	65.56%	33.33
Governor before election
Samuel Stevens Jr.
Democratic-Republican
Elected Governor
Joseph Kent
Democratic-Republican

The 1826 Maryland gubernatorial election was held on January 2, 1826, in order to elect the Governor of Maryland. Democratic-Republican nominee and incumbent member of the U.S. House of Representatives from Maryland's 2nd district Joseph Kent was elected by the Maryland General Assembly against candidates William Tyler and Thomas H. Carroll.

== General election ==
On election day, January 2, 1826, Democratic-Republican nominee Joseph Kent was elected by the Maryland General Assembly, thereby retaining Democratic-Republican control over the office of governor. Kent was sworn in as the 19th Governor of Maryland on January 9, 1826.

=== Results ===
Maryland gubernatorial election, 1826
Party	Candidate	Votes	%
Democratic-Republican	Joseph Kent	59	65.56
	William Tyler	30	33.33
	Thomas H. Carroll	1	1.11
Total votes		90	100.00
Democratic-Republican hold			
