= 1850 Maryland gubernatorial election =

- October 2, 1850
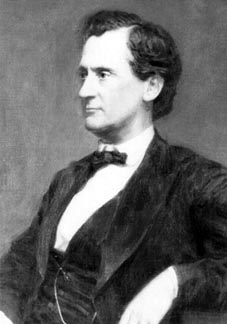

Nominee	Enoch Louis Lowe	William B. Clarke
Party	Democratic	Whig
Popular vote	36,340	34,858
Percentage	51.04%	48.96%
- County results Lowe: 50–60% Clarke: 50–60% 60–70%
Governor before election
Philip Francis Thomas
Democratic
Elected Governor
Enoch Louis Lowe
Democratic

The 1850 Maryland gubernatorial election was held on October 2, 1850, in order to elect the Governor of Maryland. Democratic nominee and former member of the Maryland House of Delegates Enoch Louis Lowe narrowly defeated Whig nominee William B. Clarke.

== General election ==
On election day, October 2, 1850, Democratic nominee Enoch Louis Lowe won the election by a margin of 1,482 votes against his opponent Whig nominee William B. Clarke, thereby retaining Democratic control over the office of governor. Lowe was sworn in as the 29th Governor of Maryland on January 6, 1851.

=== Results ===
Maryland gubernatorial election, 1850
Party	Candidate	Votes	%
Democratic	Enoch Louis Lowe	36,340	51.04
Whig	William B. Clarke	34,858	48.96
Total votes		71,198	100.00
Democratic hold			
