= List of governors of Maryland =

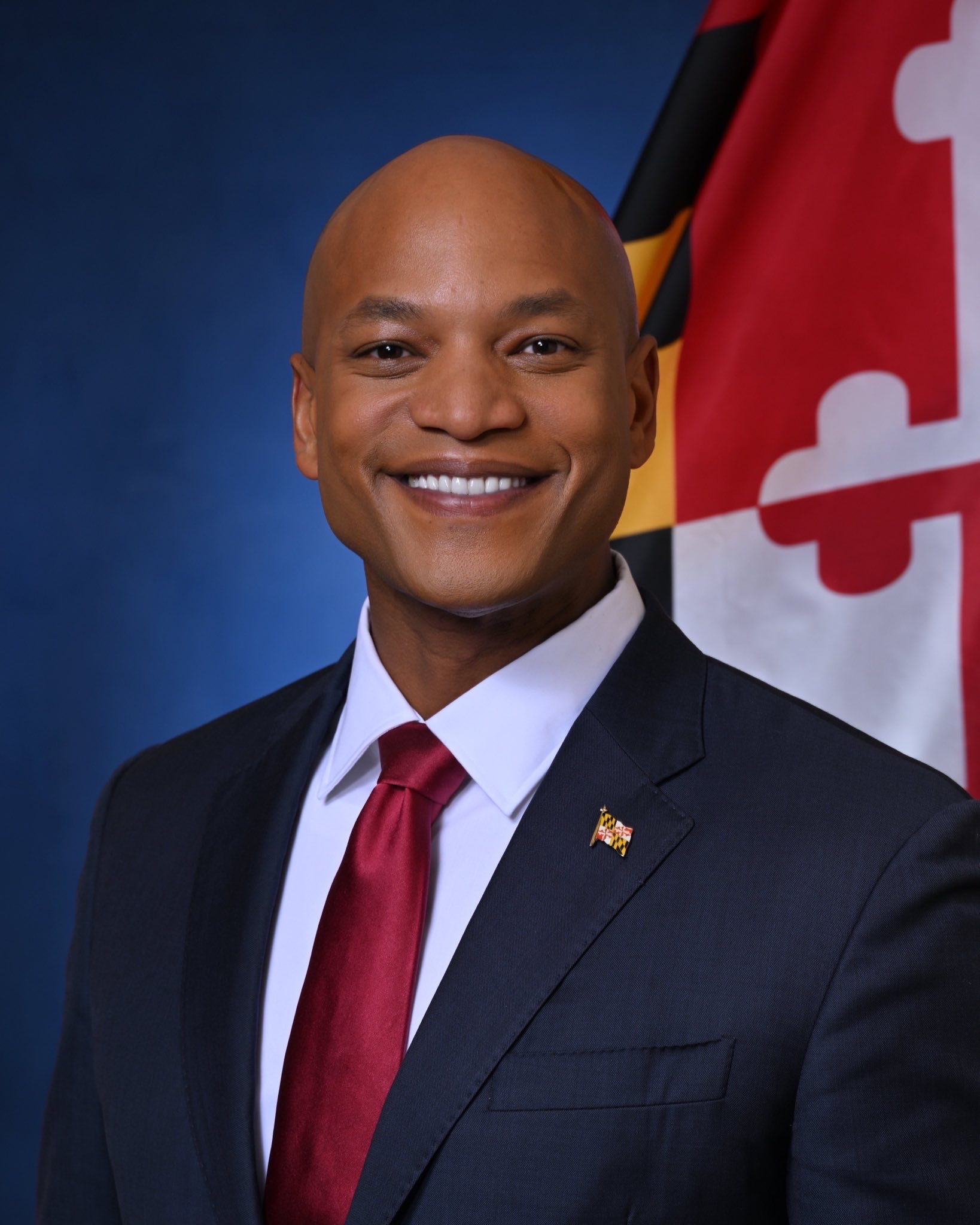
Wes Moore has been governor since January 18, 2023

The governor of Maryland is the head of government of the U.S. state of Maryland. The current governor is Democrat Wes Moore, who took office on January 18, 2023.

== Governors ==
Maryland was one of the original Thirteen Colonies and was admitted as a state on April 28, 1788. Before it declared its independence, Maryland was a colony of the Kingdom of Great Britain.

Under the constitution of 1776, governors were appointed by the Maryland General Assembly to one-year terms. They could be reelected for two additional terms, though they must take four years off after leaving office. An 1837 constitutional amendment allowed for popular election of governors to three-year terms, though they could not succeed themselves. The 1851 constitution removed the term limit, and lengthened terms to four years, to commence on the second Wednesday of January following the election. Governors were limited to two consecutive terms beginning in 1948.

The office of lieutenant governor was created in 1864, abolished in 1867, and recreated in 1970. The lieutenant governor succeeds to the office of governor should it become vacant. In the original constitution, the first named of the Governor's Council would act as governor if it were vacant, until a new governor was selected; this was changed to the secretary of state in 1837. The 1867 constitution originally called for the General Assembly to immediately elect a new governor; if they were not in session, the president of the Senate would act as governor until one was elected.

Governors of the State of Maryland
| No. | Governor | Term in office | Party | Election | Lt. Governor (Note: The office of lieutenant governor was created in 1864, abolished in 1867, and recreated in 1970.) (Note: Lieutenant governors represented the same party as their governor unless noted.) |
|---|---|---|---|---|---|
| 1 | Thomas Johnson (1732–1819) | March 21, 1777 – November 12, 1779 (967 days; retired) | No parties | 1777 | Office did not exist |
| 1 | Thomas Johnson (1732–1819) | March 21, 1777 – November 12, 1779 (967 days; retired) | No parties | 1778 | Office did not exist |
| 2 | Thomas Sim Lee (1745–1819) | November 12, 1779 – November 22, 1782 (1107 days; term-limited) (Note: Under the 1776 constitution, governors were limited to no more than three years successively, and ineligible until four years after they had been out of office.) | No parties | 1779 | Office did not exist |
| 2 | Thomas Sim Lee (1745–1819) | November 12, 1779 – November 22, 1782 (1107 days; term-limited) | No parties | 1780 | Office did not exist |
| 2 | Thomas Sim Lee (1745–1819) | November 12, 1779 – November 22, 1782 (1107 days; term-limited) | No parties | 1781 | Office did not exist |
| 3 | William Paca (1740–1799) | November 22, 1782 – November 26, 1785 (1101 days; term-limited) | No parties | 1782 | Office did not exist |
| 3 | William Paca (1740–1799) | November 22, 1782 – November 26, 1785 (1101 days; term-limited) | No parties | 1783 | Office did not exist |
| 3 | William Paca (1740–1799) | November 22, 1782 – November 26, 1785 (1101 days; term-limited) | No parties | 1784 | Office did not exist |
| 4 | William Smallwood (1732–1792) | November 26, 1785 – November 27, 1788 (1098 days; term-limited) | No parties | 1785 | Office did not exist |
| 4 | William Smallwood (1732–1792) | November 26, 1785 – November 27, 1788 (1098 days; term-limited) | No parties | 1786 | Office did not exist |
| 4 | William Smallwood (1732–1792) | November 26, 1785 – November 27, 1788 (1098 days; term-limited) | No parties | 1787 | Office did not exist |
| 5 | John Eager Howard (1752–1827) | November 27, 1788 – November 14, 1791 (1083 days; term-limited) | Federalist | 1788 | Office did not exist |
| 5 | John Eager Howard (1752–1827) | November 27, 1788 – November 14, 1791 (1083 days; term-limited) | Federalist | 1789 | Office did not exist |
| 5 | John Eager Howard (1752–1827) | November 27, 1788 – November 14, 1791 (1083 days; term-limited) | Federalist | 1790 | Office did not exist |
| 6 | George Plater (1735–1792) | November 14, 1791 – February 10, 1792 (89 days; died in office) | Federalist | 1791 | Office did not exist |
| — | James Brice (1746–1801) | February 10, 1792 – April 5, 1792 (56 days; retired) | Federalist | Senior council member acting | Office did not exist |
| 2 | Thomas Sim Lee (1745–1819) | April 5, 1792 – November 17, 1794 (957 days; retired) | Federalist | 1792 | Office did not exist |
| 2 | Thomas Sim Lee (1745–1819) | April 5, 1792 – November 17, 1794 (957 days; retired) | Federalist | 1793 | Office did not exist |
| 7 | John Hoskins Stone (1749–1804) | November 17, 1794 – November 28, 1797 (1108 days; term-limited) | Federalist | 1794 | Office did not exist |
| 7 | John Hoskins Stone (1749–1804) | November 17, 1794 – November 28, 1797 (1108 days; term-limited) | Federalist | 1795 | Office did not exist |
| 7 | John Hoskins Stone (1749–1804) | November 17, 1794 – November 28, 1797 (1108 days; term-limited) | Federalist | 1796 | Office did not exist |
| 8 | John Henry (1750–1798) | November 28, 1797 – November 14, 1798 (352 days; retired) | Federalist | 1797 | Office did not exist |
| 9 | Benjamin Ogle (1749–1809) | November 14, 1798 – November 10, 1801 (1092 days; term-limited) | Federalist | 1798 | Office did not exist |
| 9 | Benjamin Ogle (1749–1809) | November 14, 1798 – November 10, 1801 (1092 days; term-limited) | Federalist | 1799 | Office did not exist |
| 9 | Benjamin Ogle (1749–1809) | November 14, 1798 – November 10, 1801 (1092 days; term-limited) | Federalist | 1800 | Office did not exist |
| 10 | John Francis Mercer (1759–1821) | November 10, 1801 – November 15, 1803 (736 days; retired) | Democratic- Republican | 1801 | Office did not exist |
| 10 | John Francis Mercer (1759–1821) | November 10, 1801 – November 15, 1803 (736 days; retired) | Democratic- Republican | 1802 | Office did not exist |
| 11 | Robert Bowie (1750–1818) | November 15, 1803 – November 12, 1806 (1094 days; term-limited) | Democratic- Republican | 1803 | Office did not exist |
| 11 | Robert Bowie (1750–1818) | November 15, 1803 – November 12, 1806 (1094 days; term-limited) | Democratic- Republican | 1804 | Office did not exist |
| 11 | Robert Bowie (1750–1818) | November 15, 1803 – November 12, 1806 (1094 days; term-limited) | Democratic- Republican | 1805 | Office did not exist |
| 12 | Robert Wright (1752–1826) | November 12, 1806 – May 6, 1809 (907 days; resigned) (Note: Wright resigned due to a loss of popularity, and to secure a seat on the Supreme Court of Maryland, though he was not appointed to it.) | Democratic- Republican | 1806 | Office did not exist |
| 12 | Robert Wright (1752–1826) | November 12, 1806 – May 6, 1809 (907 days; resigned) | Democratic- Republican | 1807 | Office did not exist |
| 12 | Robert Wright (1752–1826) | November 12, 1806 – May 6, 1809 (907 days; resigned) | Democratic- Republican | 1808 | Office did not exist |
| — | James Butcher | May 6, 1809 – June 9, 1809 (35 days; retired) | Democratic- Republican | Senior council member acting | Office did not exist |
| 13 | Edward Lloyd V (1779–1834) | June 9, 1809 – November 16, 1811 (891 days; term-limited) | Democratic- Republican | ^{Jun.}1809 (special) (Note: Special election to fill the remainder of Robert Wright's term.) | Office did not exist |
| 13 | Edward Lloyd V (1779–1834) | June 9, 1809 – November 16, 1811 (891 days; term-limited) | Democratic- Republican | ^{Nov.}1809 | Office did not exist |
| 13 | Edward Lloyd V (1779–1834) | June 9, 1809 – November 16, 1811 (891 days; term-limited) | Democratic- Republican | 1810 | Office did not exist |
| 11 | Robert Bowie (1750–1818) | November 16, 1811 – November 23, 1812 (374 days; lost election) | Democratic- Republican | 1811 | Office did not exist |
| 14 | Levin Winder (1757–1819) | November 23, 1812 – January 2, 1816 (1136 days; term-limited) | Federalist | 1812 | Office did not exist |
| 14 | Levin Winder (1757–1819) | November 23, 1812 – January 2, 1816 (1136 days; term-limited) | Federalist | 1813 | Office did not exist |
| 14 | Levin Winder (1757–1819) | November 23, 1812 – January 2, 1816 (1136 days; term-limited) | Federalist | 1814 | Office did not exist |
| 15 | Charles Carnan Ridgely (1760–1829) | January 2, 1816 – January 8, 1819 (1103 days; term-limited) | Federalist | 1815 | Office did not exist |
| 15 | Charles Carnan Ridgely (1760–1829) | January 2, 1816 – January 8, 1819 (1103 days; term-limited) | Federalist | 1816 | Office did not exist |
| 15 | Charles Carnan Ridgely (1760–1829) | January 2, 1816 – January 8, 1819 (1103 days; term-limited) | Federalist | 1817 | Office did not exist |
| 16 | Charles Goldsborough (1765–1834) | January 8, 1819 – December 20, 1819 (347 days; lost election) | Federalist | 1818 | Office did not exist |
| 17 | Samuel Sprigg (1783–1855) | December 20, 1819 – December 16, 1822 (1093 days; term-limited) | Democratic- Republican | 1819 | Office did not exist |
| 17 | Samuel Sprigg (1783–1855) | December 20, 1819 – December 16, 1822 (1093 days; term-limited) | Democratic- Republican | 1820 | Office did not exist |
| 17 | Samuel Sprigg (1783–1855) | December 20, 1819 – December 16, 1822 (1093 days; term-limited) | Democratic- Republican | 1821 | Office did not exist |
| 18 | Samuel Stevens Jr. (1778–1860) | December 16, 1822 – January 9, 1826 (1121 days; term-limited) | Democratic- Republican | 1822 | Office did not exist |
| 18 | Samuel Stevens Jr. (1778–1860) | December 16, 1822 – January 9, 1826 (1121 days; term-limited) | Democratic- Republican | 1823 | Office did not exist |
| 18 | Samuel Stevens Jr. (1778–1860) | December 16, 1822 – January 9, 1826 (1121 days; term-limited) | Democratic- Republican | 1824 | Office did not exist |
| 19 | Joseph Kent (1779–1837) | January 9, 1826 – January 15, 1829 (1103 days; term-limited) | Democratic- Republican | 1826 | Office did not exist |
| 19 | Joseph Kent (1779–1837) | January 9, 1826 – January 15, 1829 (1103 days; term-limited) | Democratic- Republican | 1827 | Office did not exist |
| 19 | Joseph Kent (1779–1837) | January 9, 1826 – January 15, 1829 (1103 days; term-limited) | Democratic- Republican | 1828 | Office did not exist |
| 20 | Daniel Martin (1780–1831) | January 15, 1829 – January 15, 1830 (366 days; lost election) | Anti-Jacksonian | 1829 | Office did not exist |
| 21 | Thomas King Carroll (1793–1873) | January 15, 1830 – January 13, 1831 (364 days; lost election) | Jacksonian | 1830 | Office did not exist |
| 20 | Daniel Martin (1780–1831) | January 13, 1831 – July 11, 1831 (180 days; died in office) | Anti-Jacksonian | 1831 | Office did not exist |
| 22 | George Howard (1789–1846) | July 11, 1831 – January 17, 1833 (557 days; retired) | Anti-Jacksonian | Senior council member acting | Office did not exist |
| 22 | George Howard (1789–1846) | July 11, 1831 – January 17, 1833 (557 days; retired) | Anti-Jacksonian | 1832 | Office did not exist |
| 23 | James Thomas (1785–1845) | January 17, 1833 – January 14, 1836 (1093 days; term-limited) | Anti-Jacksonian | 1833 | Office did not exist |
| 23 | James Thomas (1785–1845) | January 17, 1833 – January 14, 1836 (1093 days; term-limited) | Anti-Jacksonian | 1834 | Office did not exist |
| 23 | James Thomas (1785–1845) | January 17, 1833 – January 14, 1836 (1093 days; term-limited) | Anti-Jacksonian | 1835 | Office did not exist |
| 24 | Thomas Veazey (1774–1842) | January 14, 1836 – January 7, 1839 (1090 days; term-limited) (Note: Under an 1837 amendment to the constitution, elected governors were ineligible to succeed themselves.) | Whig | 1836 | Office did not exist |
| 24 | Thomas Veazey (1774–1842) | January 14, 1836 – January 7, 1839 (1090 days; term-limited) | Whig | 1837 | Office did not exist |
| 24 | Thomas Veazey (1774–1842) | January 14, 1836 – January 7, 1839 (1090 days; term-limited) | Whig | ^{Jan.}1838 | Office did not exist |
| 25 | William Grason (1788–1868) | January 7, 1839 – January 3, 1842 (1093 days; term-limited) | Democratic | ^{Oct.}1838 | Office did not exist |
| 26 | Francis Thomas (1799–1876) | January 3, 1842 – January 6, 1845 (1100 days; term-limited) | Democratic | 1841 | Office did not exist |
| 27 | Thomas Pratt (1804–1869) | January 6, 1845 – January 3, 1848 (1093 days; term-limited) | Whig | 1844 | Office did not exist |
| 28 | Philip Francis Thomas (1810–1890) | January 3, 1848 – January 6, 1851 (1100 days; term-limited) | Democratic | 1847 | Office did not exist |
| 29 | Enoch Louis Lowe (1820–1892) | January 6, 1851 – January 11, 1854 (1102 days; retired) (Note: Sobel & Raimo say Lowe was limited from succeeding himself due to an 1846 amendment, but this appears to be in error.) | Democratic | 1850 | Office did not exist |
| 30 | Thomas Watkins Ligon (1810–1881) | January 11, 1854 – January 13, 1858 (1464 days; retired) | Democratic | 1853 | Office did not exist |
| 31 | Thomas Holliday Hicks (1798–1865) | January 13, 1858 – January 8, 1862 (1457 days; retired) | American | 1857 | Office did not exist |
| 32 | Augustus Bradford (1806–1881) | January 8, 1862 – January 10, 1866 (1464 days; retired) | Union | 1861 | Office did not exist |
| 33 | Thomas Swann (1809–1883) | January 10, 1866 – January 13, 1869 (1100 days; retired) | Union | 1864 | Christopher Christian Cox |
| 34 | Oden Bowie (1826–1894) | January 13, 1869 – January 10, 1872 (1093 days; retired) | Democratic | 1867 | Office did not exist |
| 35 | William Pinkney Whyte (1824–1908) | January 10, 1872 – March 4, 1874 (785 days; resigned) (Note: Whyte resigned, having been elected to the United States Senate.) | Democratic | 1871 | Office did not exist |
| 36 | James Black Groome (1838–1893) | March 4, 1874 – January 12, 1876 (680 days; retired) | Democratic | Elected governor by legislature | Office did not exist |
| 37 | John Lee Carroll (1830–1911) | January 12, 1876 – January 14, 1880 (1464 days; retired) | Democratic | 1875 | Office did not exist |
| 38 | William T. Hamilton (1820–1888) | January 14, 1880 – January 9, 1884 (1457 days; retired) | Democratic | 1879 | Office did not exist |
| 39 | Robert Milligan McLane (1815–1898) | January 9, 1884 – March 27, 1885 (444 days; resigned) (Note: McLane resigned, having been confirmed as United States Minister to France.) | Democratic | 1883 | Office did not exist |
| 40 | Henry Lloyd (1852–1920) | March 27, 1885 – January 11, 1888 (1021 days; retired) | Democratic | President of the Senate acting | Office did not exist |
| 41 | Elihu Emory Jackson (1837–1907) | January 11, 1888 – January 13, 1892 (1464 days; retired) | Democratic | 1887 | Office did not exist |
| 42 | Frank Brown (1846–1920) | January 13, 1892 – January 8, 1896 (1457 days; retired) | Democratic | 1891 | Office did not exist |
| 43 | Lloyd Lowndes Jr. (1845–1905) | January 8, 1896 – January 10, 1900 (1464 days; lost election) | Republican | 1895 | Office did not exist |
| 44 | John Walter Smith (1845–1925) | January 10, 1900 – January 13, 1904 (1464 days; retired) | Democratic | 1899 | Office did not exist |
| 45 | Edwin Warfield (1848–1920) | January 13, 1904 – January 8, 1908 (1457 days; retired) | Democratic | 1903 | Office did not exist |
| 46 | Austin Lane Crothers (1860–1912) | January 8, 1908 – January 10, 1912 (1464 days; retired) | Democratic | 1907 | Office did not exist |
| 47 | Phillips Lee Goldsborough (1865–1946) | January 10, 1912 – January 12, 1916 (1464 days; retired) | Republican | 1911 | Office did not exist |
| 48 | Emerson Harrington (1864–1945) | January 12, 1916 – January 14, 1920 (1464 days; retired) | Democratic | 1915 | Office did not exist |
| 49 | Albert Ritchie (1876–1936) | January 14, 1920 – January 9, 1935 (5475 days; lost election) | Democratic | 1919 | Office did not exist |
| 49 | Albert Ritchie (1876–1936) | January 14, 1920 – January 9, 1935 (5475 days; lost election) | Democratic | 1923 | Office did not exist |
| 49 | Albert Ritchie (1876–1936) | January 14, 1920 – January 9, 1935 (5475 days; lost election) | Democratic | 1926 | Office did not exist |
| 49 | Albert Ritchie (1876–1936) | January 14, 1920 – January 9, 1935 (5475 days; lost election) | Democratic | 1930 | Office did not exist |
| 50 | Harry Nice (1877–1941) | January 9, 1935 – January 11, 1939 (1464 days; lost election) | Republican | 1934 | Office did not exist |
| 51 | Herbert O'Conor (1896–1960) | January 11, 1939 – January 3, 1947 (2915 days; resigned) (Note: O'Conor resigned, having been elected to the United States Senate. Lane, who won the election, was elected by the legislature to succeed O'Conor immediately, five days before he would have taken office.) | Democratic | 1938 | Office did not exist |
| 51 | Herbert O'Conor (1896–1960) | January 11, 1939 – January 3, 1947 (2915 days; resigned) | Democratic | 1942 | Office did not exist |
| 52 | William Preston Lane Jr. (1892–1967) | January 3, 1947 – January 10, 1951 (1469 days; lost election) | Democratic | Elected by legislature | Office did not exist |
| 52 | William Preston Lane Jr. (1892–1967) | January 3, 1947 – January 10, 1951 (1469 days; lost election) | Democratic | 1946 | Office did not exist |
| 53 | Theodore McKeldin (1900–1974) | January 10, 1951 – January 14, 1959 (2927 days; term-limited) (Note: Under a 1948 amendment to the constitution, governors who have served two consecutive elected terms are ineligible for the next term.) | Republican | 1950 | Office did not exist |
| 53 | Theodore McKeldin (1900–1974) | January 10, 1951 – January 14, 1959 (2927 days; term-limited) | Republican | 1954 | Office did not exist |
| 54 | J. Millard Tawes (1894–1979) | January 14, 1959 – January 25, 1967 (2934 days; term-limited) | Democratic | 1958 | Office did not exist |
| 54 | J. Millard Tawes (1894–1979) | January 14, 1959 – January 25, 1967 (2934 days; term-limited) | Democratic | 1962 | Office did not exist |
| 55 | Spiro Agnew (1918–1996) | January 25, 1967 – January 7, 1969 (714 days; resigned) (Note: Agnew resigned, having been elected Vice President of the United States.) | Republican | 1966 | Office did not exist |
| 56 | Marvin Mandel (1920–2015) | January 7, 1969 – January 17, 1979 (3663 days; term-limited) | Democratic | 1969 (special) (Note: Mandel was elected by the Maryland General Assembly to fill the vacancy left by Agnew's resignation.) | Blair Lee III |
| 56 | Marvin Mandel (1920–2015) | January 7, 1969 – January 17, 1979 (3663 days; term-limited) | Democratic | 1970 | Blair Lee III |
| 56 | Marvin Mandel (1920–2015) | January 7, 1969 – January 17, 1979 (3663 days; term-limited) | Democratic | 1974 | Blair Lee III |
| — | Blair Lee III (1916–1985) | June 4, 1977 (Note: Mandel named Lieutenant Governor Lee acting governor on June 4, 1977, as he was dealing with charges of mail fraud and racketeering, and citing health reasons; he would be found guilty in August, and sentenced to four years in prison in October. He rescinded the designation on January 15, 1979, two days before the end of the term; he then made Lee acting governor again for a time on January 16 so he could preside at the installation of a judge on the Court of Appeals.) – January 15, 1979 (591 days; lost nomination) | Democratic | Lieutenant governor acting | Acting as governor |
| 57 | Harry Hughes (1926–2019) | January 17, 1979 – January 21, 1987 (2927 days; term-limited) (Note: Hughes, being term-limited, had already lost the Democratic nomination for the United States Senate when his term ended.) | Democratic | 1978 | Samuel Bogley |
| 57 | Harry Hughes (1926–2019) | January 17, 1979 – January 21, 1987 (2927 days; term-limited) | Democratic | 1982 | J. Joseph Curran Jr. |
| 58 | William Donald Schaefer (1921–2011) | January 21, 1987 – January 18, 1995 (2920 days; term-limited) | Democratic | 1986 | Melvin Steinberg |
| 58 | William Donald Schaefer (1921–2011) | January 21, 1987 – January 18, 1995 (2920 days; term-limited) | Democratic | 1990 | Melvin Steinberg |
| 59 | Parris Glendening (b. 1942) | January 18, 1995 – January 15, 2003 (2920 days; term-limited) | Democratic | 1994 | Kathleen Kennedy Townsend |
| 59 | Parris Glendening (b. 1942) | January 18, 1995 – January 15, 2003 (2920 days; term-limited) | Democratic | 1998 | Kathleen Kennedy Townsend |
| 60 | Bob Ehrlich (b. 1957) | January 15, 2003 – January 17, 2007 (1464 days; lost election) | Republican | 2002 | Michael Steele |
| 61 | Martin O'Malley (b. 1963) | January 17, 2007 – January 21, 2015 (2927 days; term-limited) | Democratic | 2006 | Anthony Brown |
| 61 | Martin O'Malley (b. 1963) | January 17, 2007 – January 21, 2015 (2927 days; term-limited) | Democratic | 2010 | Anthony Brown |
| 62 | Larry Hogan (b. 1956) | January 21, 2015 – January 18, 2023 (2920 days; term-limited) | Republican | 2014 | Boyd Rutherford |
| 62 | Larry Hogan (b. 1956) | January 21, 2015 – January 18, 2023 (2920 days; term-limited) | Republican | 2018 | Boyd Rutherford |
| 63 | Wes Moore (b. 1978) | January 18, 2023 – Incumbent (Note: Moore's term will expire on January 20, 2027; he was elected to a second term on November 3, 2026.) (in office 1405 days) | Democratic | 2022 | Aruna Miller |
| 63 | Wes Moore (b. 1978) | January 18, 2023 – Incumbent (in office 1405 days) | Democratic | 2026 | Aruna Miller |

== See also ==
- Gubernatorial lines of succession in the United States § Maryland
- First ladies of Maryland
- Lieutenant Governor of Maryland
- List of colonial governors of Maryland
- List of Maryland General Assembly sessions

== Sources ==
- "Former Maryland Governors". National Governors Association.
- "Governors of Maryland". Maryland State Archives.
- "Maryland Constitution". State Democracy Research Initiative. University of Wisconsin Law School.
- Dubin, Michael J. (2003). United States Gubernatorial Elections, 1776–1860: The Official Results by State and County. McFarland. ISBN 0-7864-1439-1 – via Internet Archive.
- Glashan, Roy R. (1979). American Governors and Gubernatorial Elections, 1775-1978. Meckler Books. ISBN 0-7201-1511-6 – via Internet Archive.
- Kallenbach, Joseph E.; Kallenbach, Jessamine S. (1977). American State Governors, 1776-1976. Oceana Publications. ISBN 978-0-379-00665-0 – via Internet Archive.
- Mullaney, Marie Marmo (1994). Biographical Directory of the Governors of the United States, 1988–1994. Greenwood Publishing Group. ISBN 0-313-28312-5 – via Internet Archive.
- Sobel, Robert; Raimo, John (1978). Biographical Directory of the Governors of the United States, 1789-1978. Vol. 2. Meckler Books. ISBN 0-930466-01-2 – via Internet Archive.
- Thorpe, Francis Newton, ed. (1909). The Federal and State Constitutions, Colonial Charters, and Other Organic Laws of the States, Territories, and Colonies Now or Heretofore Forming the United States of America. Vol. 3. United States Government Publishing Office – via Internet Archive.
