= 1835 Maryland gubernatorial election =

- January 5, 1835
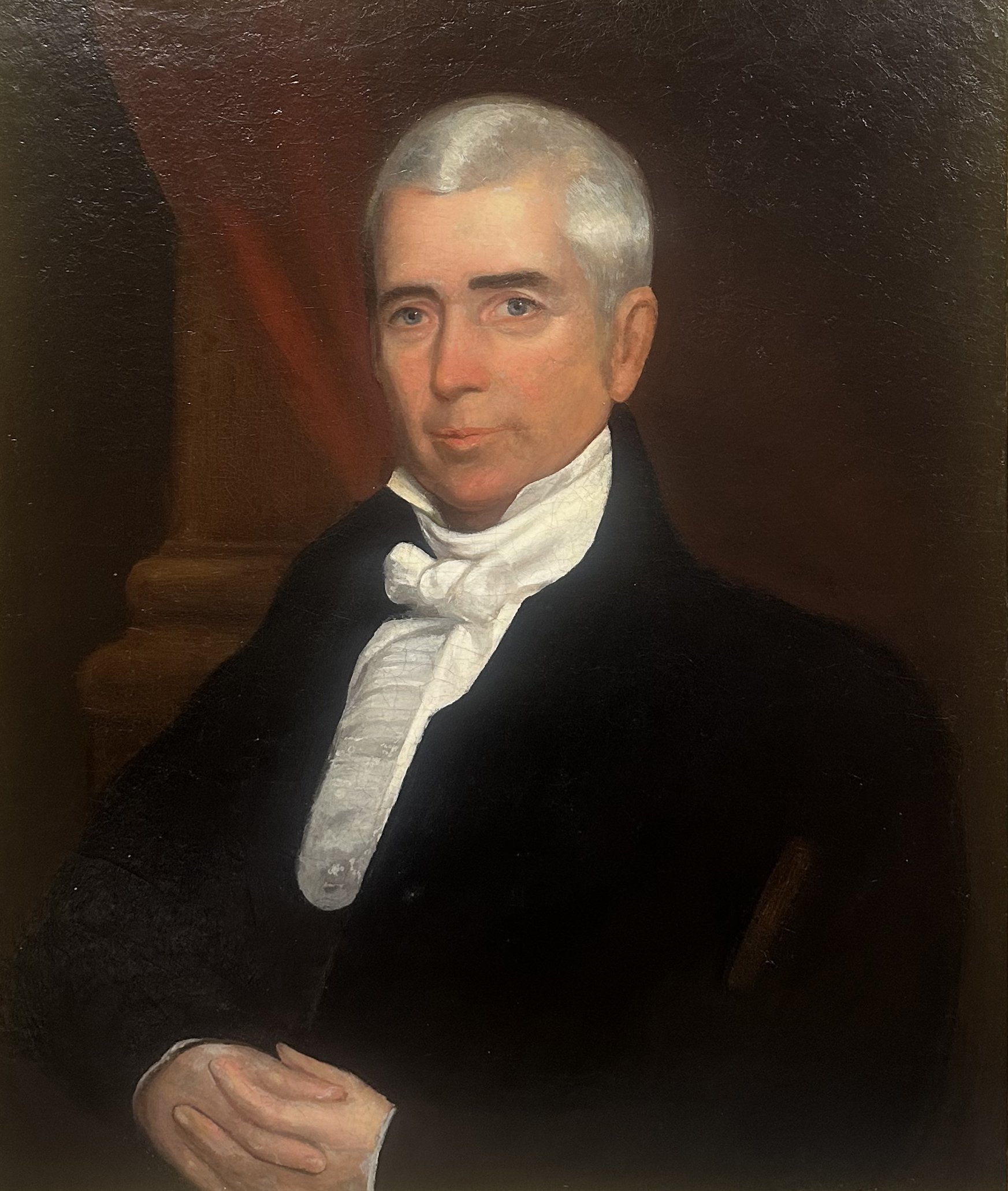
Nominee	James Thomas
Party	National Republican
Popular vote	67
Percentage	80.72%
Governor before election
James Thomas
National Republican
Elected Governor
James Thomas
National Republican

The 1835 Maryland gubernatorial election was held on January 5, 1835, in order to elect the governor of Maryland. Incumbent National Republican governor James Thomas was re-elected by the Maryland General Assembly against candidates Joshua Jones and Joseph Weast.

== General election ==
On election day, January 5, 1835, incumbent National Republican governor James Thomas was re-elected by the Maryland General Assembly, thereby retaining National Republican control over the office of governor. Thomas was sworn in for his third term on January 15, 1835.

=== Results ===
Maryland gubernatorial election, 1835
Party	Candidate	Votes	%
National Republican	James Thomas (incumbent)	67	80.72
	Did Not Vote	13	15.66
	Joshua Jones	2	2.41
	Joseph Weast	1	1.21
Total votes		83	100.00
National Republican hold			
