= 1833 Maryland gubernatorial election =

- January 7, 1833
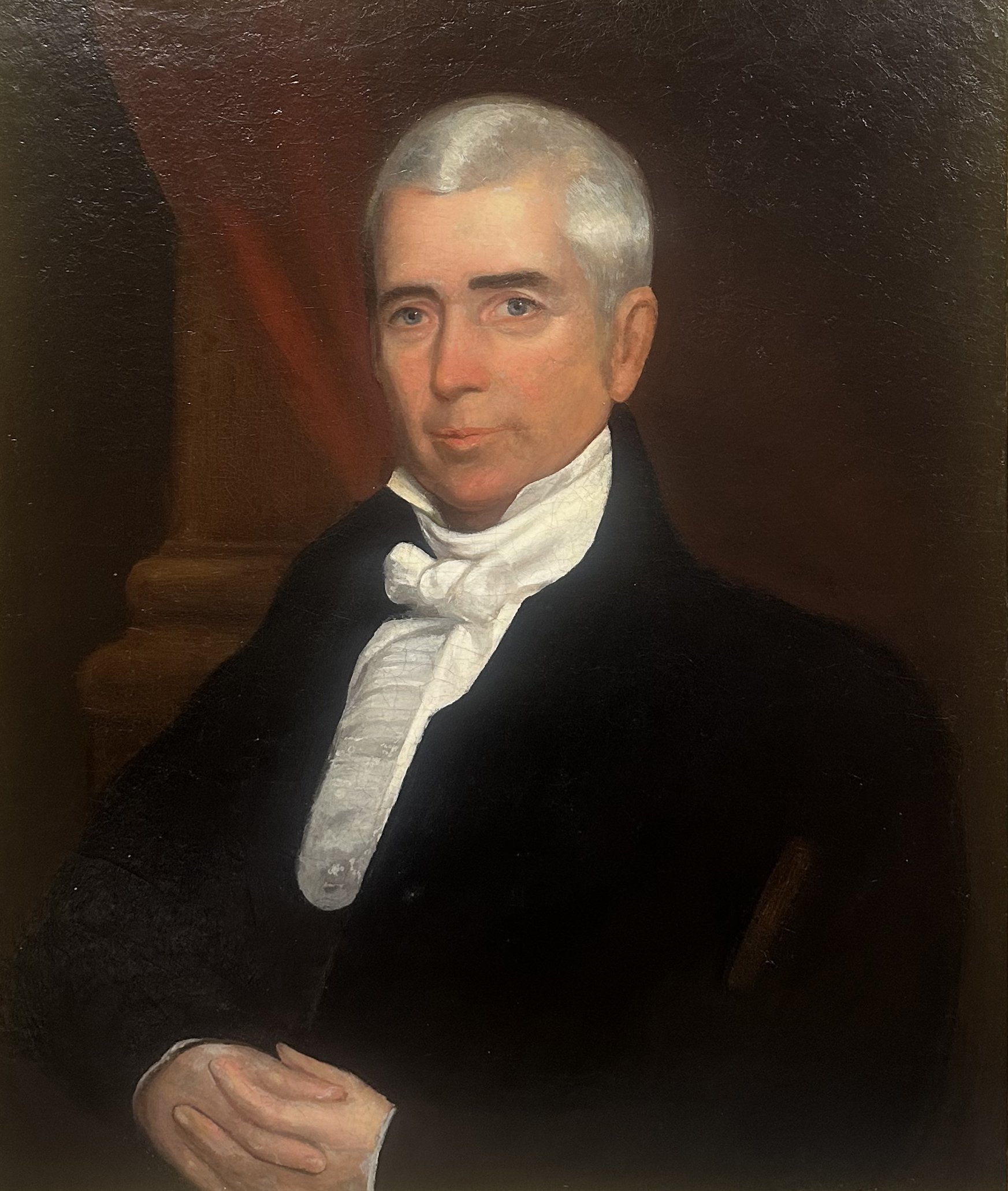
Nominee	James Thomas
Party	National Republican
Popular vote	62
Percentage	72.09%
Governor before election
George Howard
National Republican
Elected Governor
James Thomas
National Republican

The 1833 Maryland gubernatorial election was held on January 7, 1833, in order to elect the Governor of Maryland. National Republican nominee and former member of the Maryland Senate James Thomas was elected by the Maryland General Assembly against candidates John S. Stoddart and John Thomas.

== General election ==
On election day, January 7, 1833, National Republican nominee James Thomas was elected by the Maryland General Assembly, thereby retaining National Republican control over the office of governor. Thomas was sworn in as the 23rd Governor of Maryland on January 17, 1833.

=== Results ===
Maryland gubernatorial election, 1833
Party	Candidate	Votes	%
National Republican	James Thomas	62	72.09
	Did Not Vote	21	24.42
	John S. Stoddart	2	2.33
	John Thomas	1	1.16
Total votes		86	100.00
National Republican hold			
