= 1793 Maryland gubernatorial election =

- November 15, 1793
Nominee	Thomas Sim Lee
Party	Federalist
Popular vote	1
Percentage	100.00%
Governor before election
Thomas Sim Lee
Federalist
Elected Governor
Thomas Sim Lee
Federalist

The 1793 Maryland gubernatorial election was held on November 15, 1793, in order to elect the Governor of Maryland. Incumbent Federalist Governor Thomas Sim Lee was easily re-elected by the Maryland General Assembly as he ran unopposed. The exact results of this election are unknown.

== General election ==
On election day, November 15, 1793, incumbent Federalist Governor Thomas Sim Lee was re-elected by the Maryland General Assembly, thereby retaining Federalist control over the office of governor. Lee was sworn in for his sixth term overall on November 15, 1793.

=== Results ===
Maryland gubernatorial election, 1793
Party	Candidate	Votes	%
Federalist	Thomas Sim Lee (incumbent)	1	100.00
Total votes		1	100.00
Federalist hold			
