= 1779 Maryland gubernatorial election =

- November 8, 1779

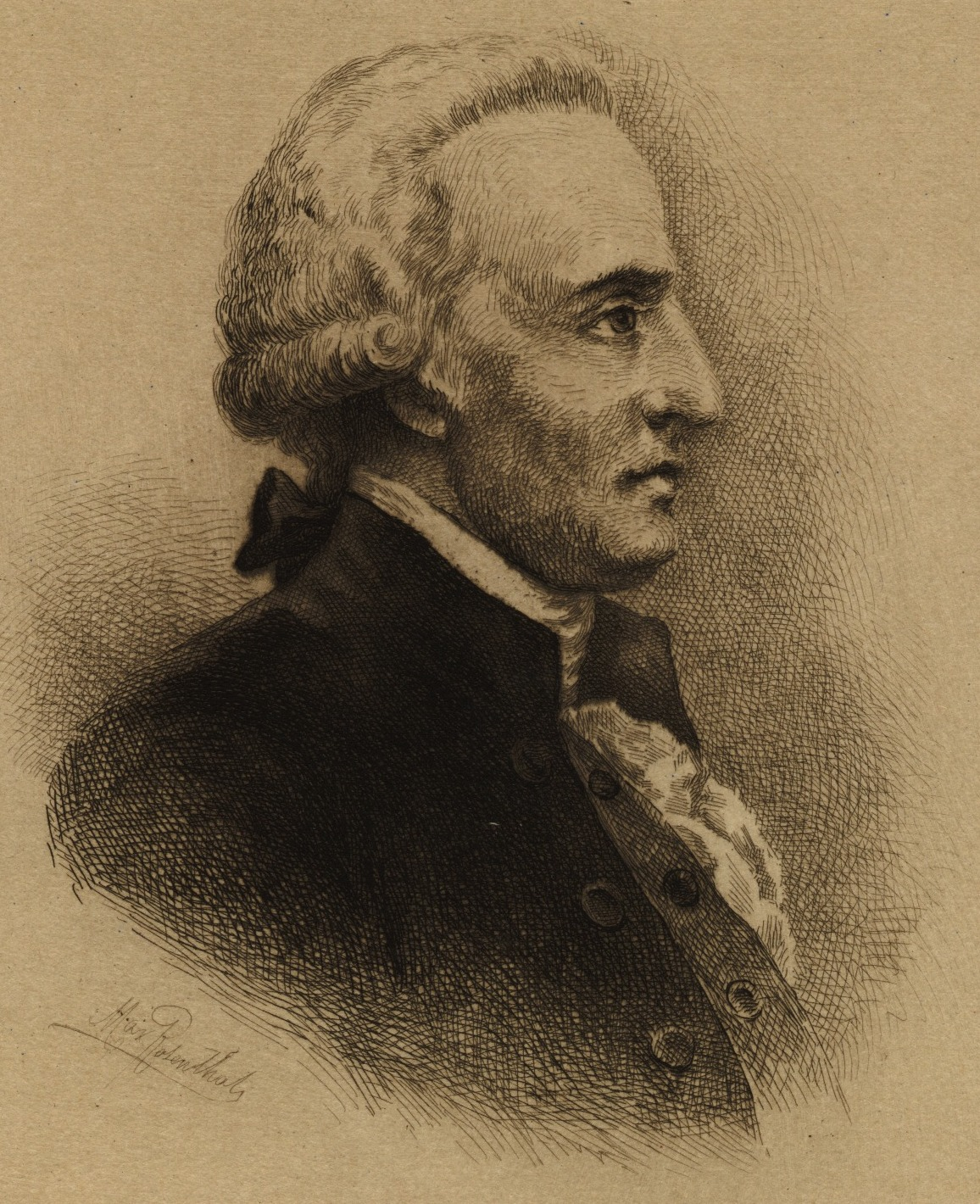
Nominee	Thomas Sim Lee	Edward Lloyd
Party	Nonpartisan	Nonpartisan
Popular vote	39	18
Percentage	68.42%	31.58%
Governor before election
Thomas Johnson
Nonpartisan
Elected Governor
Thomas Sim Lee
Nonpartisan

The 1779 Maryland gubernatorial election was held on November 8, 1779, in order to elect the Governor of Maryland. Candidate Thomas Sim Lee was elected by the Maryland General Assembly against his opponent Edward Lloyd.

== General election ==
On election day, November 8, 1779, Thomas Sim Lee was elected by the Maryland General Assembly. Lee was sworn in as the 2nd Governor of Maryland on November 12, 1779.

=== Results ===
Maryland gubernatorial election, 1779
Party	Candidate	Votes	%
Nonpartisan	Thomas Sim Lee	39	68.42
Nonpartisan	Edward Lloyd	18	31.58
Total votes		57	100.00
Nonpartisan hold			
