= 1778 Maryland gubernatorial election =

- November 9, 1778
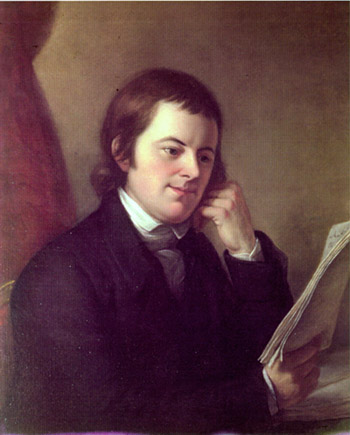
Nominee	Thomas Johnson
Party	Nonpartisan
Percentage	100.00%
Governor before election
Thomas Johnson
Nonpartisan
Elected Governor
Thomas Johnson
Nonpartisan

The 1778 Maryland gubernatorial election was held on November 9, 1778, in order to elect the Governor of Maryland. Incumbent Governor Thomas Johnson was easily re-elected by the Maryland General Assembly as he ran unopposed. The exact results of this election are unknown.

== General election ==
On election day, November 9, 1778, Thomas Johnson was re-elected by the Maryland General Assembly. Johnson was sworn in for his second term on November 10, 1778.

=== Results ===
Maryland gubernatorial election, 1778
Party	Candidate	Votes	%
Nonpartisan	Thomas Johnson (incumbent)	Unknown	100.00
Total votes		Unknown	100.00
Nonpartisan hold			
