= 1844 Maryland gubernatorial election =

- October 2, 1844
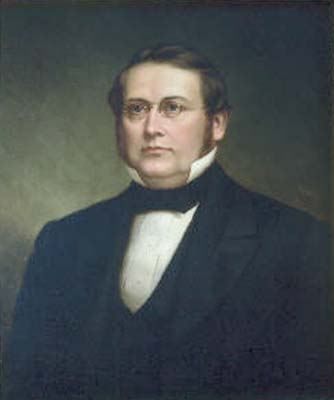

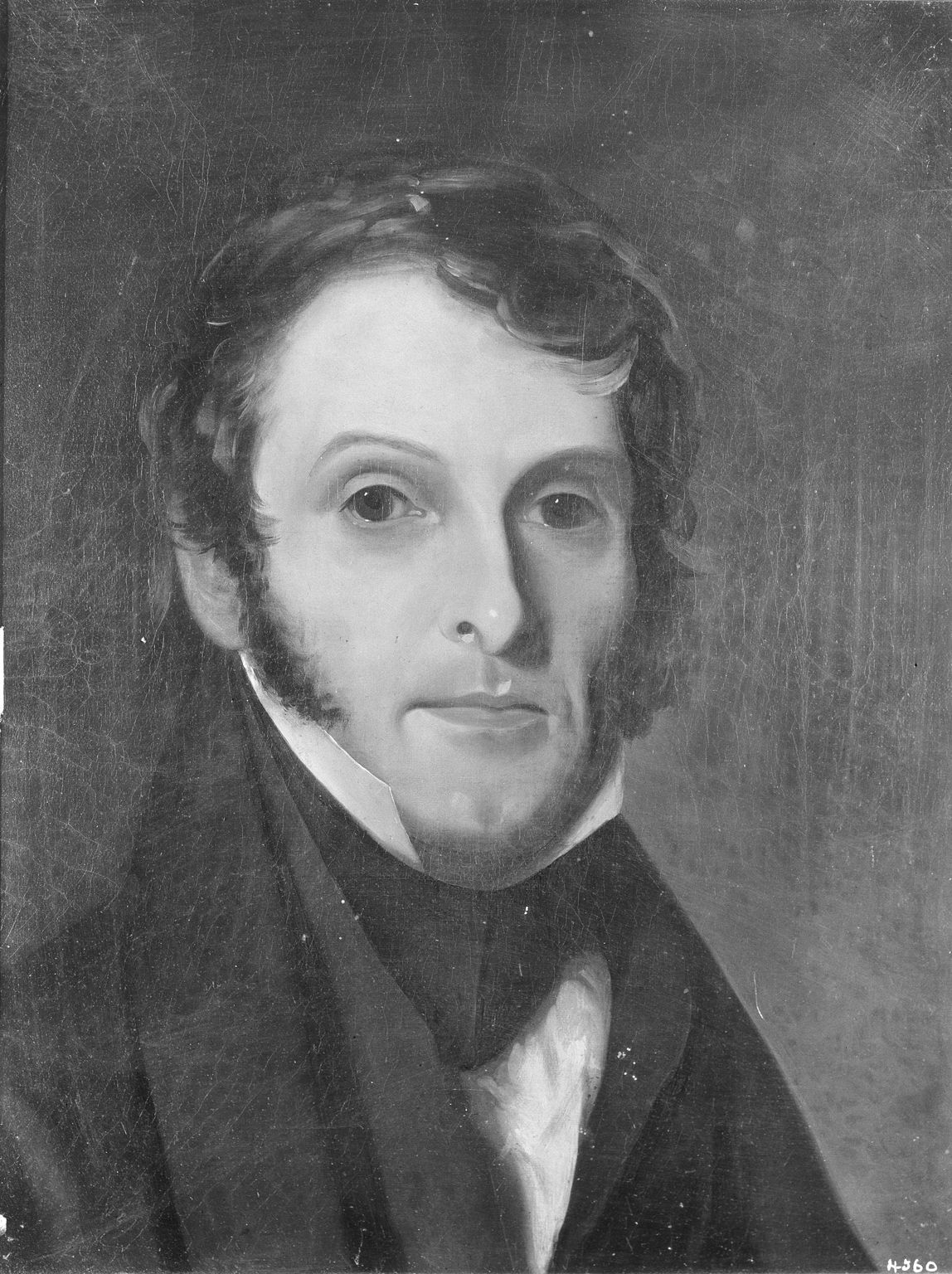
Nominee	Thomas Pratt	James Carroll
Party	Whig	Democratic
Popular vote	35,040	34,492
Percentage	50.39%	49.61%
- County results Pratt: 50–60% 60–70% Carroll: 50–60%
Governor before election
Francis Thomas
Democratic
Elected Governor
Thomas Pratt
Whig

The 1844 Maryland gubernatorial election was held on October 2, 1844, in order to elect the Governor of Maryland. Whig nominee and former member of the Maryland House of Delegates Thomas Pratt narrowly defeated Democratic nominee and former member of the U.S. House of Representatives from Maryland's 4th district James Carroll.

== General election ==
On election day, October 2, 1844, Whig nominee Thomas Pratt won the election by a margin of 548 votes against his opponent Democratic nominee James Carroll, thereby gaining Whig control over the office of governor. Pratt was sworn in as the 27th Governor of Maryland on January 6, 1845.

=== Results ===
Maryland gubernatorial election, 1844
Party	Candidate	Votes	%
Whig	Thomas Pratt	35,040	50.39
Democratic	James Carroll	34,492	49.61
Total votes		69,532	100.00
Whig gain from Democratic			
