= 1799 Maryland gubernatorial election =

- November 18, 1799
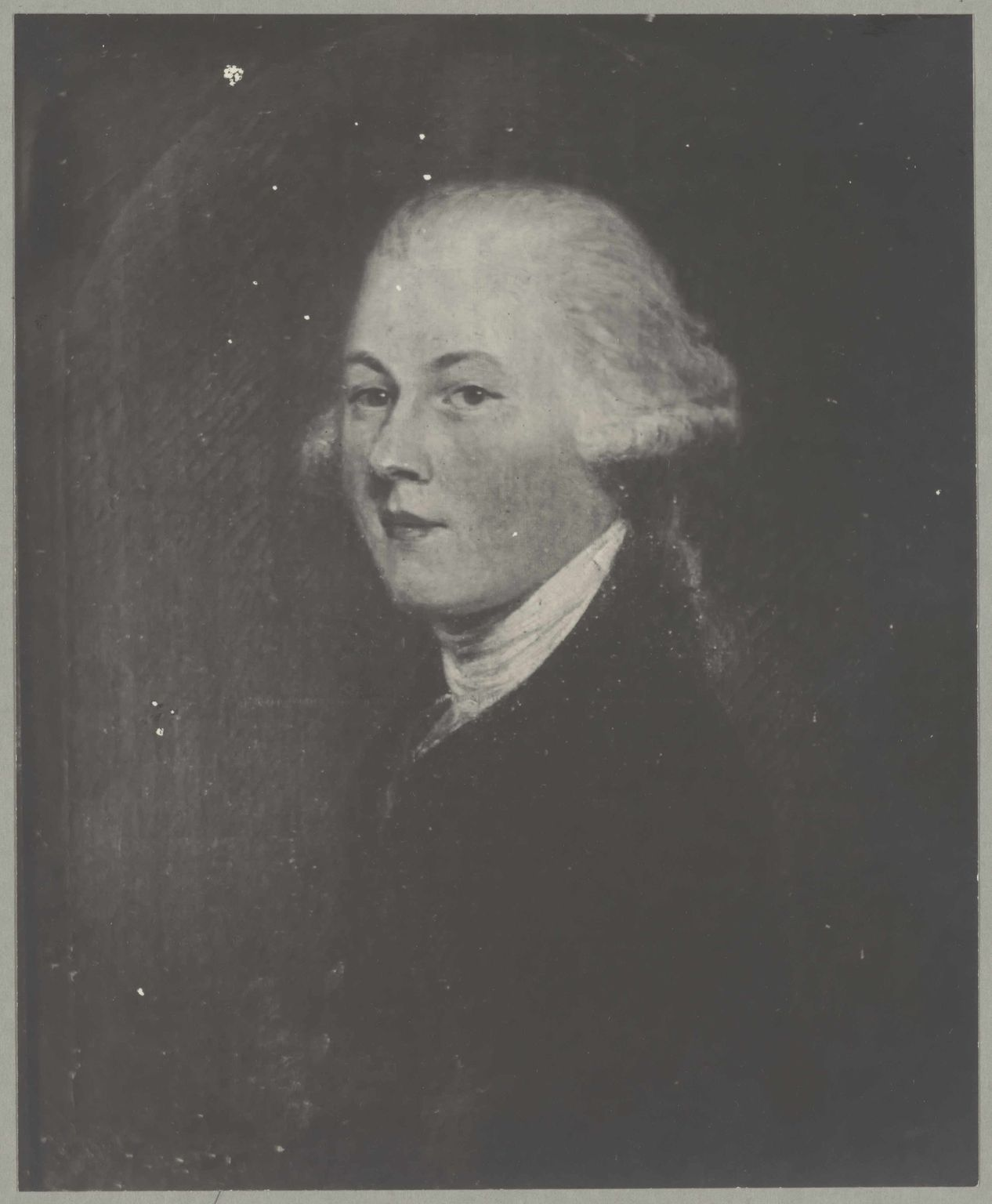
Nominee	Benjamin Ogle
Party	Federalist
Popular vote	1
Percentage	100.00%
Governor before election
Benjamin Ogle
Federalist
Elected Governor
Benjamin Ogle
Federalist

The 1799 Maryland gubernatorial election was held on November 18, 1799, in order to elect the Governor of Maryland. Incumbent Federalist Governor Benjamin Ogle was easily re-elected by the Maryland General Assembly as he ran unopposed. The exact results of this election are unknown.

== General election ==
On election day, November 18, 1799, incumbent Federalist Governor Benjamin Ogle was re-elected by the Maryland General Assembly, thereby retaining Federalist control over the office of governor. Ogle was sworn in for his second term on November 19, 1799.

=== Results ===
Maryland gubernatorial election, 1799
Party	Candidate	Votes	%
Federalist	Benjamin Ogle (incumbent)	1	100.00
Total votes		1	100.00
Federalist hold			
