= 1829 Maryland gubernatorial election =

- January 5, 1829

Nominee	Daniel Martin	George E. Martin
Party	National Republican	Democratic
Popular vote	52	38
Percentage	57.78%	42.22%
Governor before election
Joseph Kent
Democratic-Republican
Elected Governor
Daniel Martin
National Republican

The 1829 Maryland gubernatorial election was held on January 5, 1829, in order to elect the Governor of Maryland. National Republican nominee and former member of the Maryland House of Delegates Daniel Martin was elected by the Maryland General Assembly against Democratic nominee George E. Martin.

== General election ==
On election day, January 5, 1829, National Republican nominee Daniel Martin was elected by the Maryland General Assembly, thereby gaining National Republican control over the office of governor. Martin was sworn in as the 20th Governor of Maryland on January 15, 1829.

=== Results ===
Maryland gubernatorial election, 1829
Party	Candidate	Votes	%
National Republican	Daniel Martin	52	57.78
Democratic	George E. Martin	38	42.22
Total votes		90	100.00
National Republican gain from Democratic-Republican			
