= 1853 Maryland gubernatorial election =

- November 2, 1853
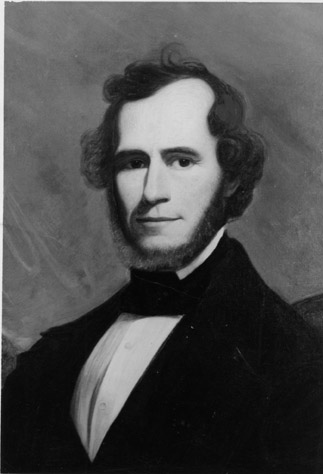

Nominee	Thomas Watkins Ligon	Richard Bowie
Party	Democratic	Whig
Popular vote	39,087	34,939
Percentage	52.80%	47.20%
- County results Ligon: 50–60% 60–70% Bowie: 50–60% 60–70% Tie: 50%
Governor before election
Enoch Louis Lowe
Democratic
Elected Governor
Thomas Watkins Ligon
Democratic

The 1853 Maryland gubernatorial election was held on November 2, 1853, in order to elect the Governor of Maryland. Democratic nominee and former member of the U.S. House of Representatives from Maryland's 3rd district Thomas Watkins Ligon defeated Whig nominee and former member of the U.S. House of Representatives Richard Bowie.

== General election ==
On election day, November 2, 1853, Democratic nominee Thomas Watkins Ligon won the election by a margin of 4,148 votes against his opponent Whig nominee Richard Bowie, thereby retaining Democratic control over the office of governor. Ligon was sworn in as the 30th Governor of Maryland on January 11, 1854.

=== Results ===
Maryland gubernatorial election, 1853
Party	Candidate	Votes	%
Democratic	Thomas Watkins Ligon	39,087	52.80
Whig	Richard Bowie	34,939	47.20
Total votes		74,026	100.00
Democratic hold			
