= 1790 Maryland gubernatorial election =

- November 8, 1790
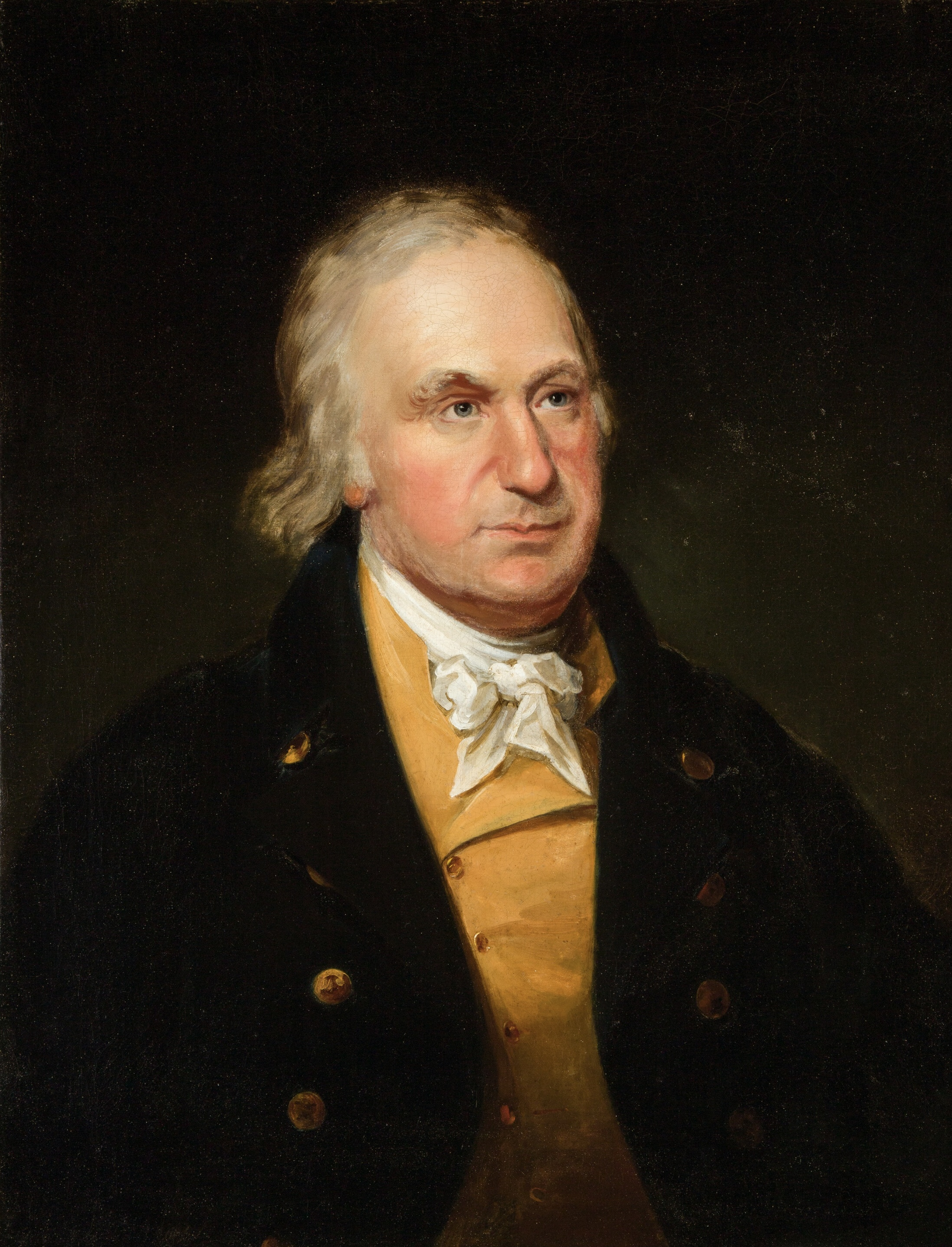
Nominee	John Eager Howard
Party	Federalist
Popular vote	1
Percentage	100.00%
Governor before election
John Eager Howard
Federalist
Elected Governor
John Eager Howard
Federalist

The 1790 Maryland gubernatorial election was held on November 8, 1790, in order to elect the Governor of Maryland. Incumbent Federalist Governor John Eager Howard was easily re-elected by the Maryland General Assembly as he ran unopposed. The exact results of this election are unknown.

== General election ==
On election day, November 8, 1790, incumbent Federalist Governor John Eager Howard was re-elected by the Maryland General Assembly, thereby retaining Federalist control over the office of governor. Howard was sworn in for his third term on November 8, 1790.

=== Results ===
Maryland gubernatorial election, 1790
Party	Candidate	Votes	%
Federalist	John Eager Howard (incumbent)	1	100.00
Total votes		1	100.00
Federalist hold			
