= 1832 Maryland gubernatorial election =

- January 2, 1832
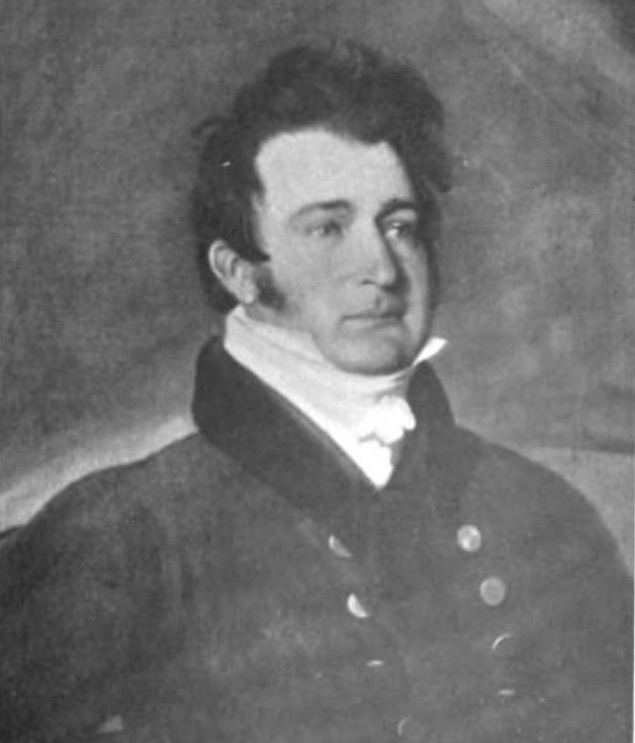

Nominee	George Howard	Nicholas Brewer
Party	National Republican	Democratic
Popular vote	64	5
Percentage	78.05%	6.10%
Governor before election
George Howard (Acting)
National Republican
Elected Governor
George Howard
National Republican

The 1832 Maryland gubernatorial election was held on January 2, 1832, in order to elect the Governor of Maryland. Incumbent National Republican Acting Governor George Howard was elected by the Maryland General Assembly against Democratic nominee Nicholas Brewer.

== General election ==
On election day, January 2, 1832, incumbent National Republican Acting Governor George Howard was elected by the Maryland General Assembly, thereby retaining National Republican control over the office of governor. Howard was sworn in for his first full term on January 17, 1832.

=== Results ===
Maryland gubernatorial election, 1832
Party	Candidate	Votes	%
National Republican	George Howard	64	78.05
	Did Not Vote	13	15.85
Democratic	Nicholas Brewer	5	6.10
Total votes		82	100.00
National Republican hold			
