= 1798 Maryland gubernatorial election =

- November 14, 1798
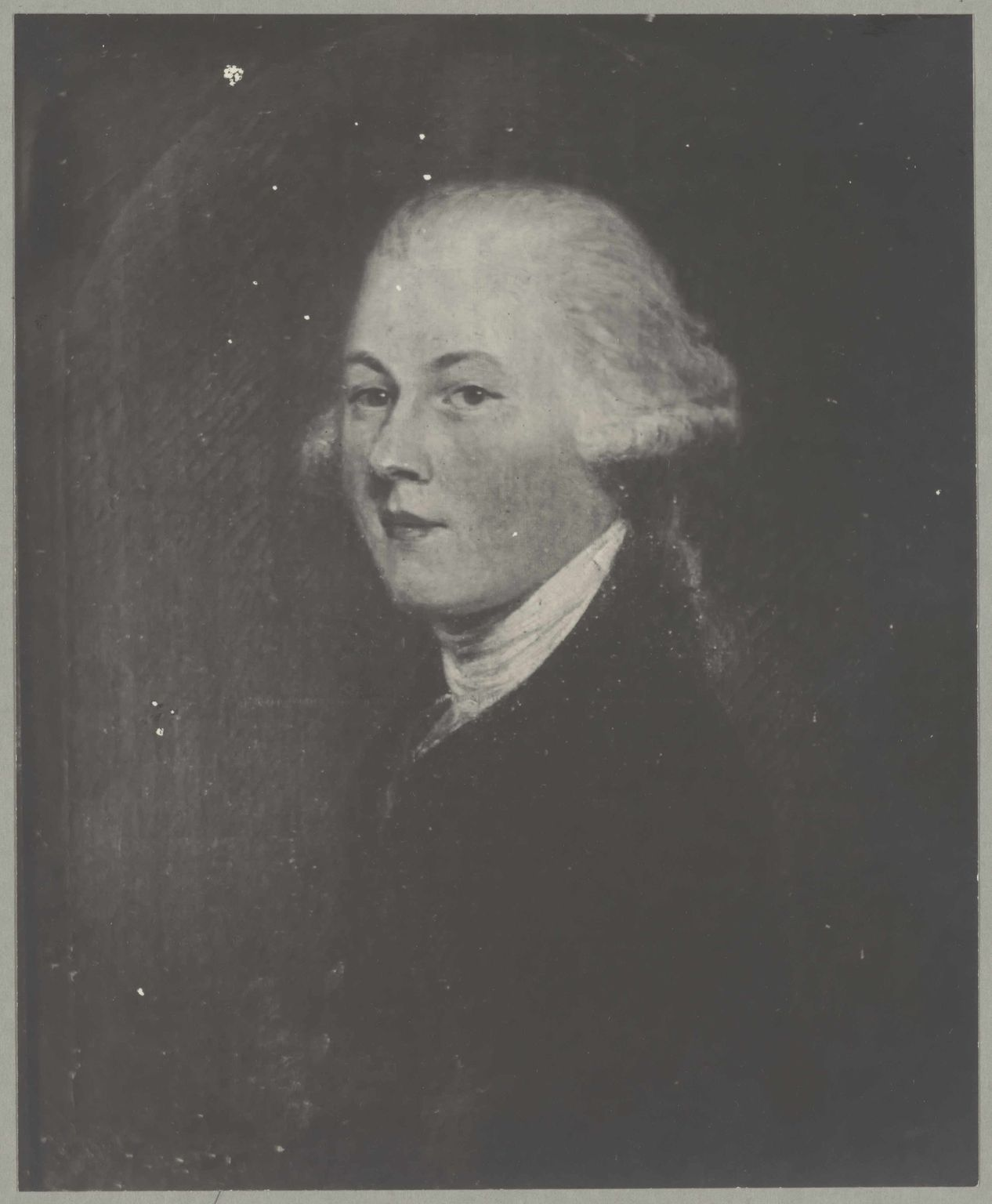

Nominee	Benjamin Ogle	Nicholas Carroll
Party	Federalist	Federalist
Popular vote	1	0
Percentage	100.00%	0.00%
Governor before election
John Henry
Federalist
Elected Governor
Benjamin Ogle
Federalist

The 1798 Maryland gubernatorial election was held on November 14, 1798, in order to elect the Governor of Maryland. Federalist candidate Benjamin Ogle was elected by the Maryland General Assembly against his opponent, fellow Federalist candidate Nicholas Carroll. The exact results of this election are unknown.

== General election ==
On election day, November 14, 1798, Federalist candidate Benjamin Ogle was elected by the Maryland General Assembly, thereby retaining Federalist control over the office of governor. Ogle was sworn in as the 9th Governor of Maryland on November 14, 1798.

=== Results ===
Maryland gubernatorial election, 1798
Party	Candidate	Votes	%
Federalist	Benjamin Ogle	1	100.00
Federalist	Nicholas Carroll	0	0.00
Total votes		1	100.00
Federalist hold			
