= January 1838 Maryland gubernatorial election =

- January 2, 1838
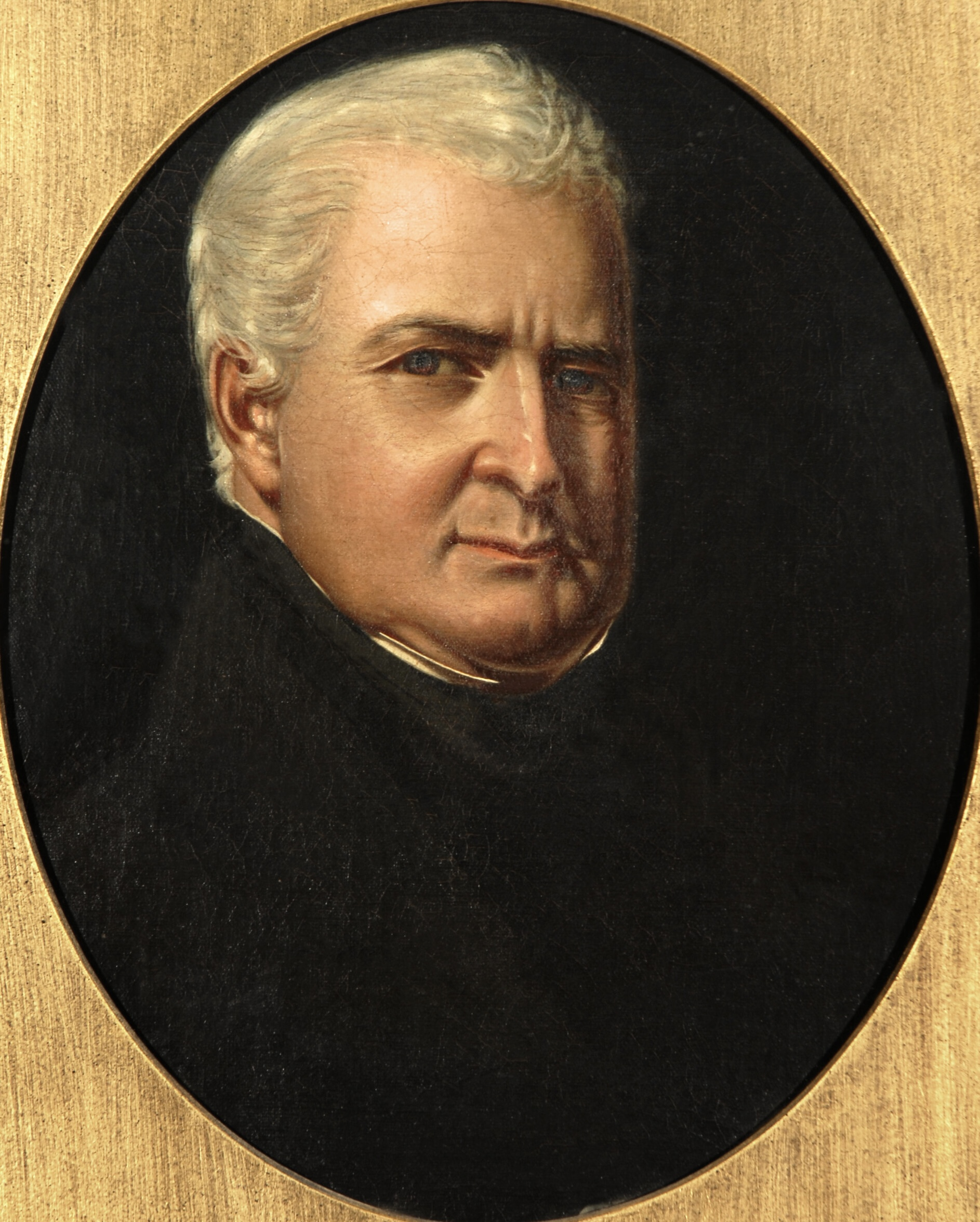
Nominee	Thomas Veazey
Party	Whig
Popular vote	52
Percentage	66.67%
Governor before election
Thomas Veazey
Whig
Elected Governor
Thomas Veazey
Whig

The January 1838 Maryland gubernatorial election was held on January 2, 1838, in order to elect the governor of Maryland. Incumbent Whig governor Thomas Veazey was re-elected by the Maryland General Assembly as he ran unopposed.

== General election ==
On election day, January 2, 1838, incumbent Whig governor Thomas Veazey was re-elected by the Maryland General Assembly, thereby retaining Whig control over the office of governor. Veazey was sworn in for his third term on January 19, 1838.

=== Results ===
Maryland gubernatorial election, January 1838
Party	Candidate	Votes	%
Whig	Thomas Veazey (incumbent)	52	66.67
	Did Not Vote	24	30.77
	Scattering	2	2.56
Total votes		78	100.00
Whig hold			
