= 1780 Maryland gubernatorial election =

- November 13, 1780
Nominee	Thomas Sim Lee
Party	Nonpartisan
Percentage	100.00%
Governor before election
Thomas Sim Lee
Nonpartisan
Elected Governor
Thomas Sim Lee
Nonpartisan

The 1780 Maryland gubernatorial election was held on November 13, 1780, in order to elect the Governor of Maryland. Incumbent Governor Thomas Sim Lee was easily re-elected by the Maryland General Assembly as he ran unopposed. The exact results of this election are unknown.

== General election ==
On election day, November 13, 1780, Thomas Sim Lee was re-elected by the Maryland General Assembly. Lee was sworn in for his second term on November 15, 1780.
