= 1791 Maryland gubernatorial election =

- November 14, 1791
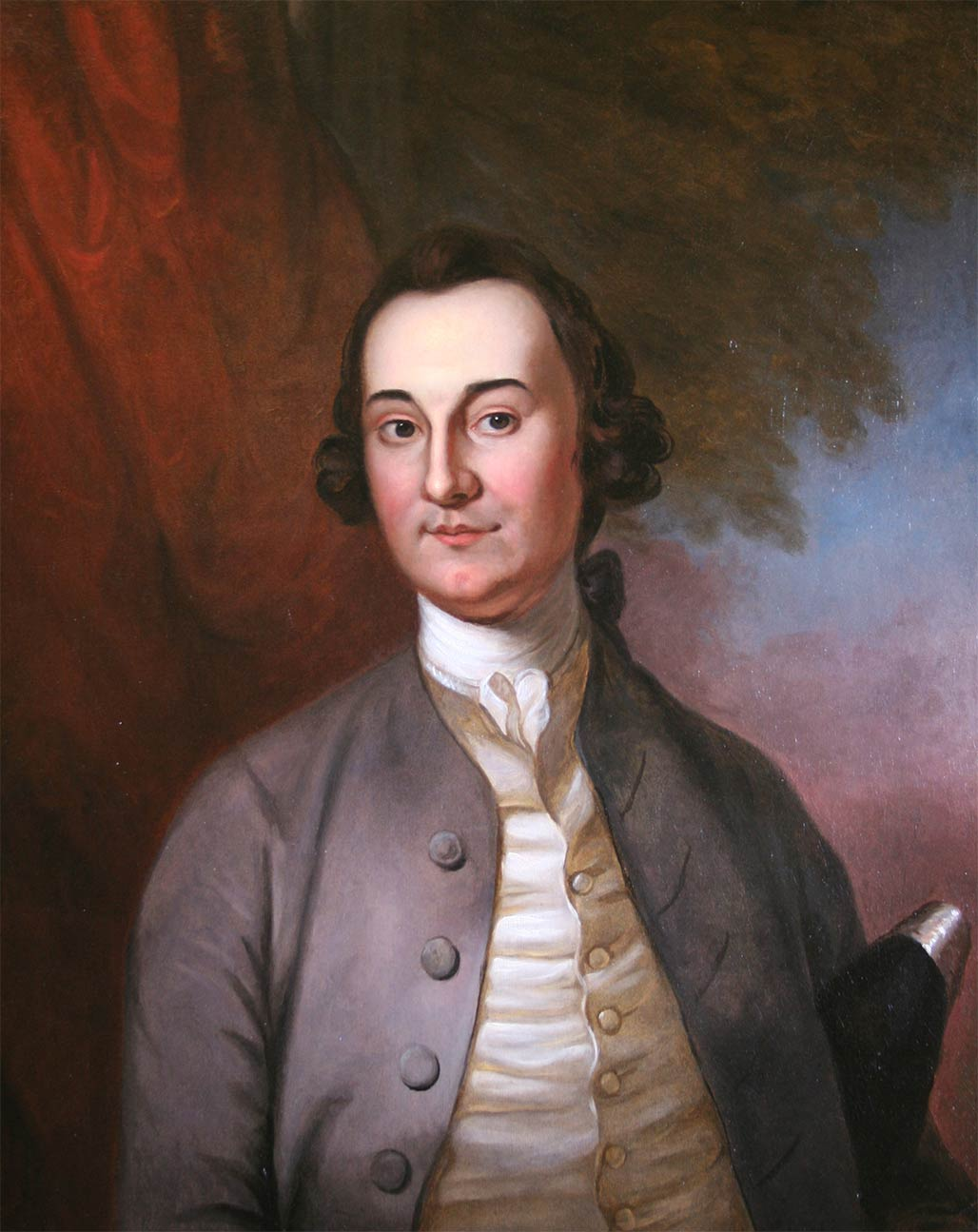
Nominee	George Plater
Party	Federalist
Percentage	100.00%
Governor before election
John Eager Howard
Federalist
Elected Governor
George Plater
Federalist

The 1791 Maryland gubernatorial election was held on November 14, 1791, in order to elect the Governor of Maryland. Federalist candidate and former member of the Maryland Senate George Plater was easily elected by the Maryland General Assembly as he ran unopposed. The exact results of this election are unknown.

== General election ==
On election day, November 14, 1791, Federalist candidate George Plater was elected by the Maryland General Assembly, thereby retaining Federalist control over the office of governor. Plater was sworn in as the 6th Governor of Maryland on November 14, 1791.

=== Results ===
Maryland gubernatorial election, 1791
Party	Candidate	Votes	%
Federalist	George Plater	140	100.00
Total votes		140	100.00
Federalist hold			
