= 1834 Maryland gubernatorial election =

- January 6, 1834
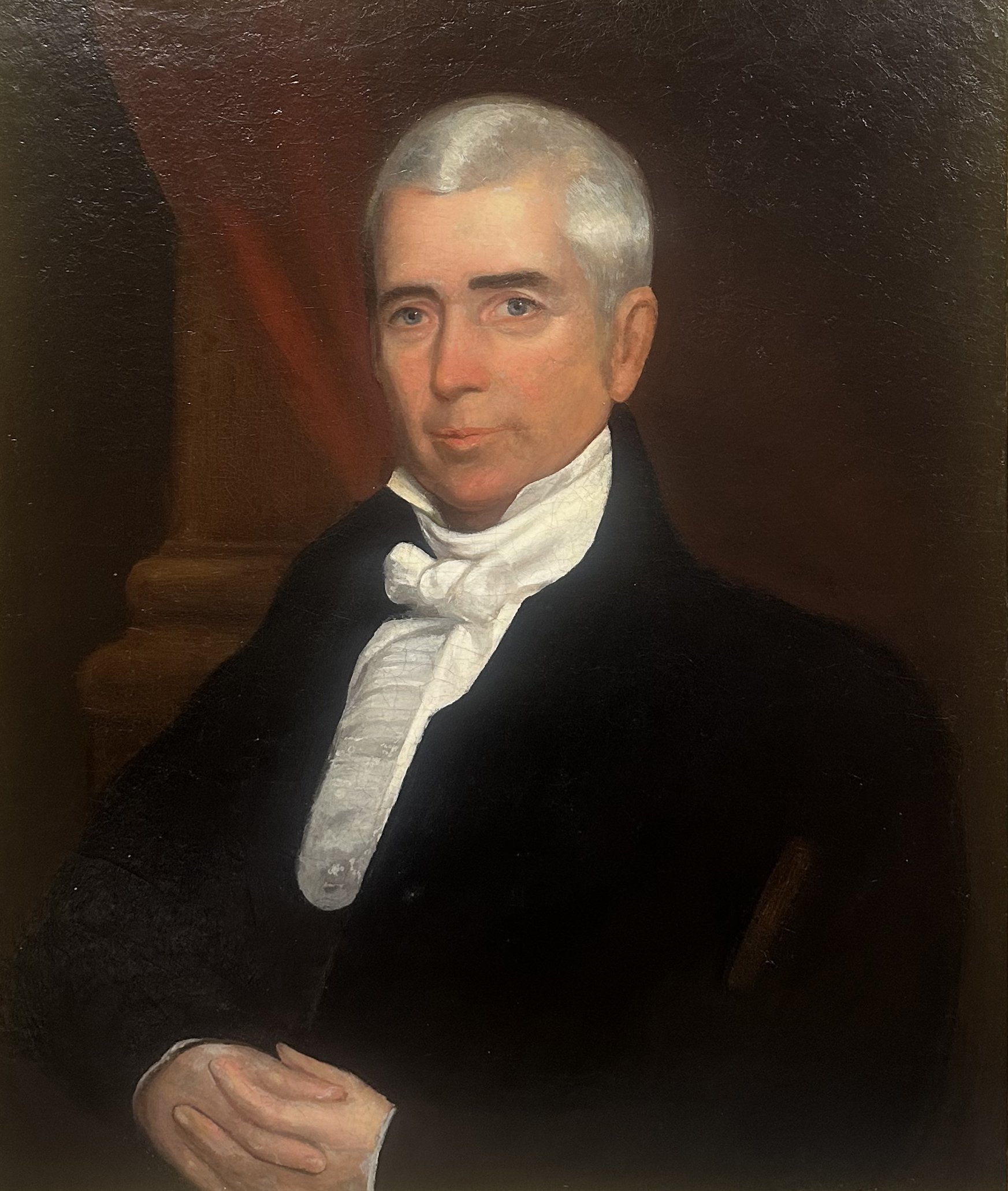

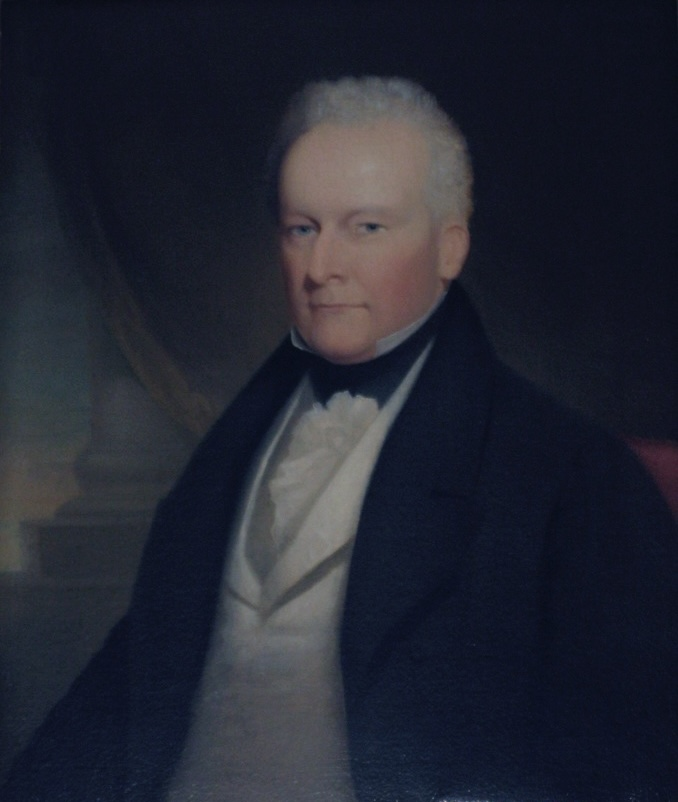
Nominee	James Thomas	Edward Lloyd
Party	National Republican	Democratic
Popular vote	48	46
Percentage	50.53%	48.42%
Governor before election
James Thomas
National Republican
Elected Governor
James Thomas
National Republican

The 1834 Maryland gubernatorial election was held on January 6, 1834, in order to elect the governor of Maryland. Incumbent National Republican governor James Thomas was re-elected by the Maryland General Assembly against Democratic nominee and former governor Edward Lloyd.

== General election ==
On election day, January 6, 1834, incumbent National Republican governor James Thomas was re-elected by the Maryland General Assembly, thereby retaining National Republican control over the office of governor. Thomas was sworn in for his second term on January 16, 1834.

=== Results ===
Maryland gubernatorial election, 1834
Party	Candidate	Votes	%
National Republican	James Thomas (incumbent)	48	50.53
Democratic	Edward Lloyd	46	48.42
	Did Not Vote	1	1.05
Total votes		95	100.00
National Republican hold			
