= 1827 Maryland gubernatorial election =

- January 1, 1827
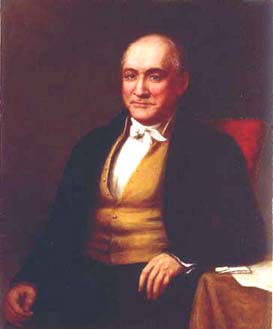
Nominee	Joseph Kent
Party	Democratic-Republican
Popular vote	84
Percentage	97.68%
Governor before election
Joseph Kent
Democratic-Republican
Elected Governor
Joseph Kent
Democratic-Republican

The 1827 Maryland gubernatorial election was held on January 1, 1827, in order to elect the governor of Maryland. Incumbent Democratic-Republican governor Joseph Kent was re-elected by the Maryland General Assembly against fellow Democratic-Republican candidate Isaac McKim.

== General election ==
On election day, January 1, 1827, incumbent Democratic-Republican governor Joseph Kent was re-elected by the Maryland General Assembly, thereby retaining Democratic-Republican control over the office of governor. Kent was sworn in for his second term on January 18, 1827.

=== Results ===
Maryland gubernatorial election, 1827
Party	Candidate	Votes	%
Democratic-Republican	Joseph Kent (incumbent)	84	97.68
Democratic-Republican	Isaac McKim	1	1.16
	Did Not Vote	1	1.16
Total votes		86	100.00
Democratic-Republican hold			
