= 1800 Maryland gubernatorial election =

- November 10, 1800
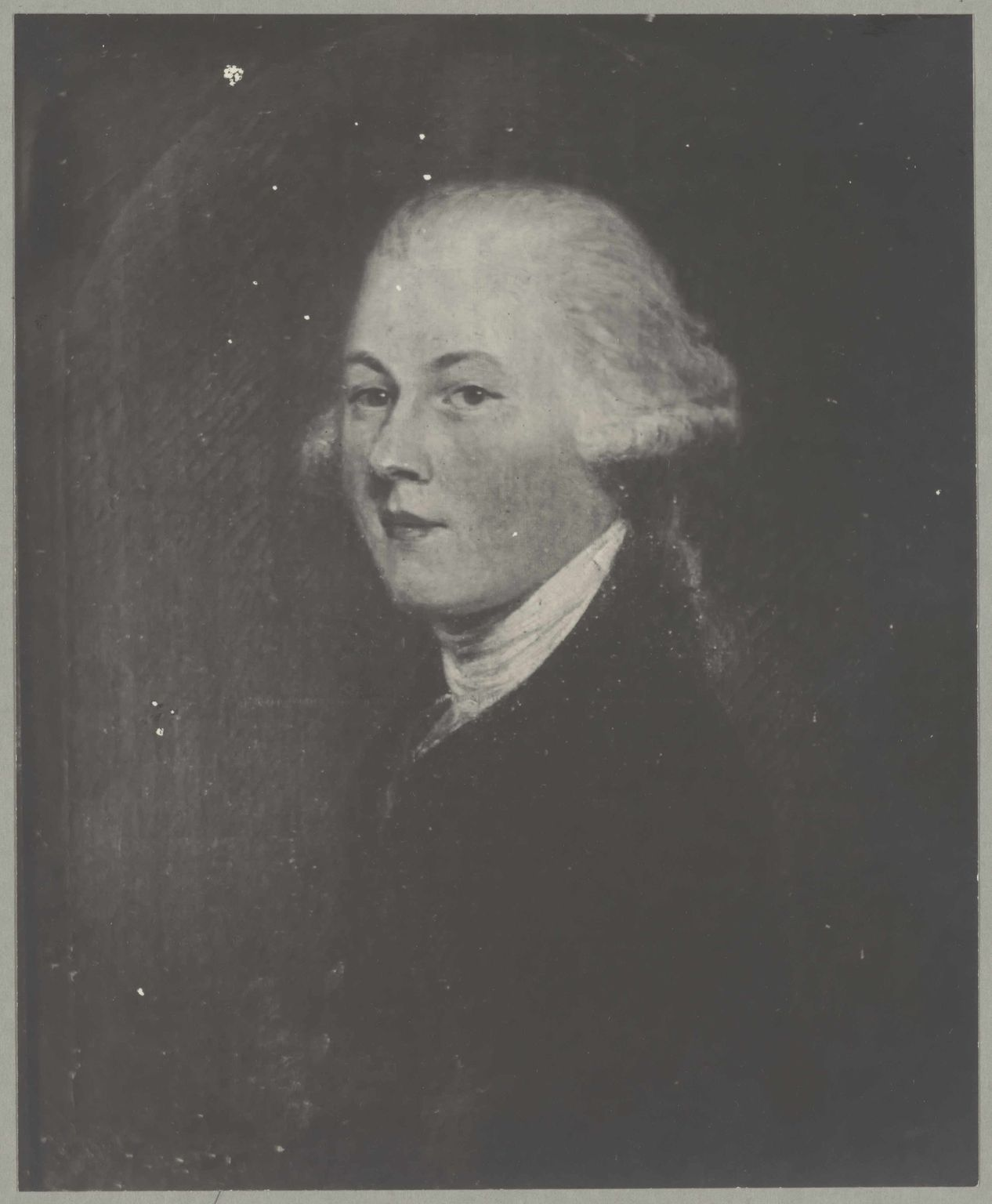
Nominee	Benjamin Ogle
Party	Federalist
Popular vote	1
Percentage	100.00%
Governor before election
Benjamin Ogle
Federalist
Elected Governor
Benjamin Ogle
Federalist

The 1800 Maryland gubernatorial election was held on November 10, 1800, in order to elect the Governor of Maryland. Incumbent Federalist Governor Benjamin Ogle was easily re-elected by the Maryland General Assembly as he ran unopposed. The exact results of this election are unknown.

== General election ==
On election day, November 10, 1800, incumbent Federalist Governor Benjamin Ogle was re-elected by the Maryland General Assembly, thereby retaining Federalist control over the office of governor. Ogle was sworn in for his third term on November 11, 1800.

=== Results ===
Maryland gubernatorial election, 1800
Party	Candidate	Votes	%
Federalist	Benjamin Ogle (incumbent)	1	100.00
Total votes		1	100.00
Federalist hold			
