= 1823 Maryland gubernatorial election =

- December 8, 1823
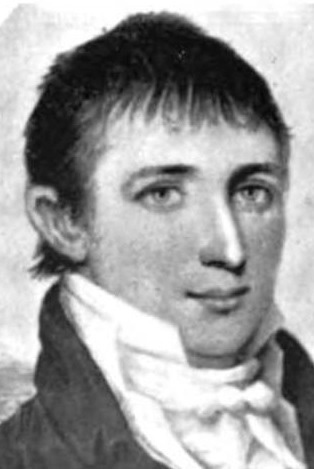
Nominee	Samuel Stevens Jr.
Party	Democratic-Republican
Popular vote	74
Percentage	97.37%
Governor before election
Samuel Stevens Jr.
Democratic-Republican
Elected Governor
Samuel Stevens Jr.
Democratic-Republican

The 1823 Maryland gubernatorial election was held on December 8, 1823, in order to elect the governor of Maryland. Incumbent Democratic-Republican governor Samuel Stevens Jr. was re-elected by the Maryland General Assembly against former Federalist governor Charles Goldsborough.

== General election ==
On election day, December 8, 1823, incumbent Democratic-Republican governor Samuel Stevens Jr. was re-elected by the Maryland General Assembly, thereby retaining Democratic-Republican control over the office of governor. Stevens was sworn in for his second term on January 5, 1824.

=== Results ===
Maryland gubernatorial election, 1823
Party	Candidate	Votes	%
Democratic-Republican	Samuel Stevens Jr. (incumbent)	74	97.37
Federalist	Charles Goldsborough	1	1.32
	Did Not Vote	1	1.32
Total votes		76	100.00
Democratic-Republican hold			
