= 1811 Maryland gubernatorial election =

- November 11, 1811
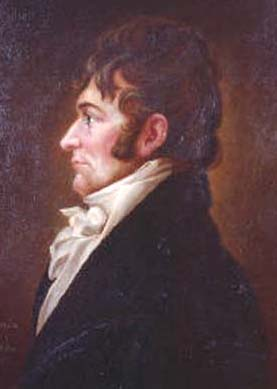

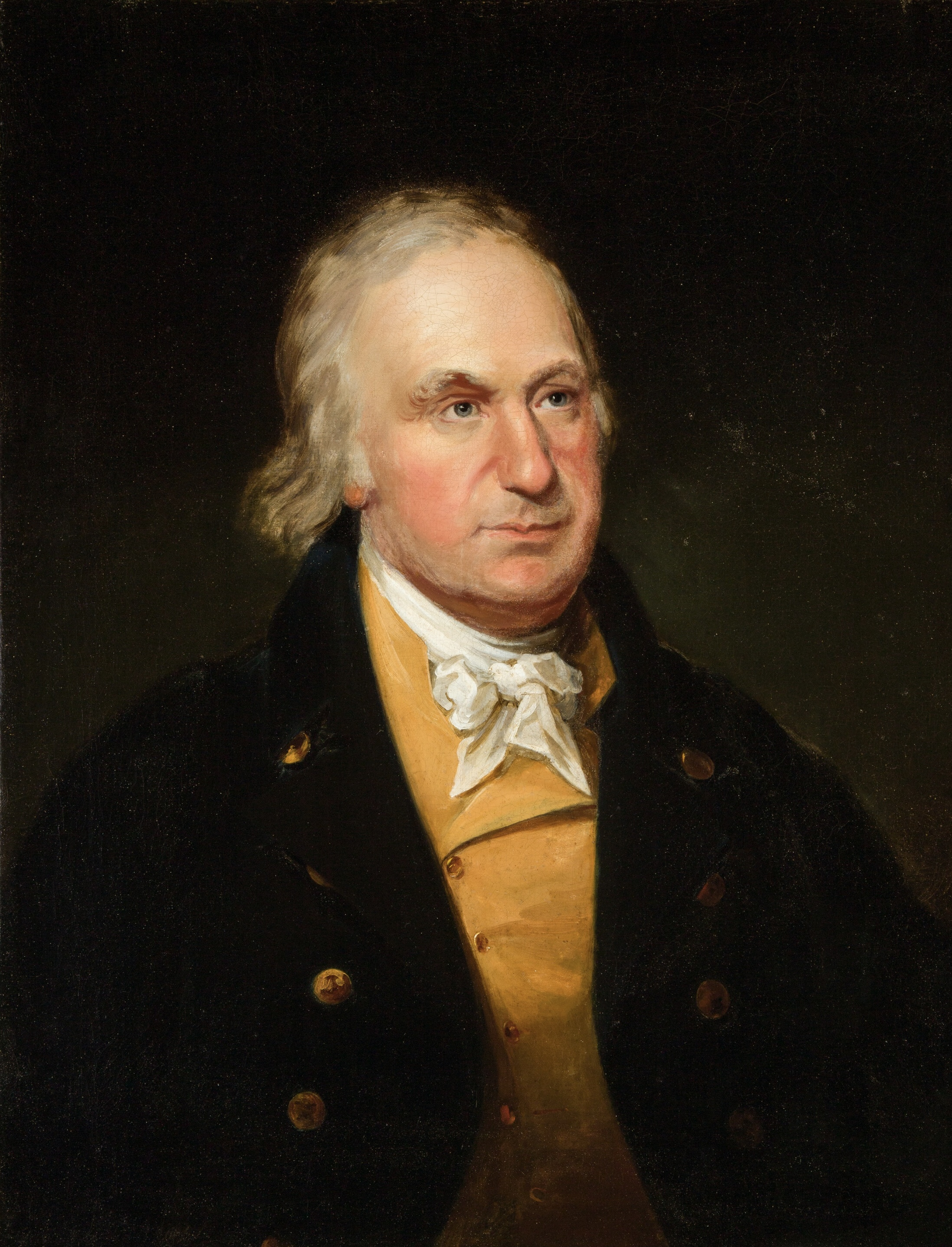
Nominee	Robert Bowie	John Eager Howard
Party	Democratic-Republican	Federalist
Popular vote	51	25
Percentage	67.10%	32.90%
Governor before election
Edward Lloyd
Democratic-Republican
Elected Governor
Robert Bowie
Democratic-Republican

The 1811 Maryland gubernatorial election was held on November 11, 1811, in order to elect the governor of Maryland. Former Democratic-Republican governor Robert Bowie was elected by the Maryland General Assembly against Federalist nominee and fellow former governor John Eager Howard.

== General election ==
On election day, November 11, 1811, former Democratic-Republican governor Robert Bowie was elected by the Maryland General Assembly, thereby retaining Democratic-Republican control over the office of governor. Bowie was sworn in for his fourth overall term on November 16, 1811.

=== Results ===
Maryland gubernatorial election, 1811
Party	Candidate	Votes	%
Democratic-Republican	Robert Bowie	51	67.10
Federalist	John Eager Howard	25	32.90
Total votes		76	100.00
Democratic-Republican hold			
