= 1787 Maryland gubernatorial election =

- November 22, 1787
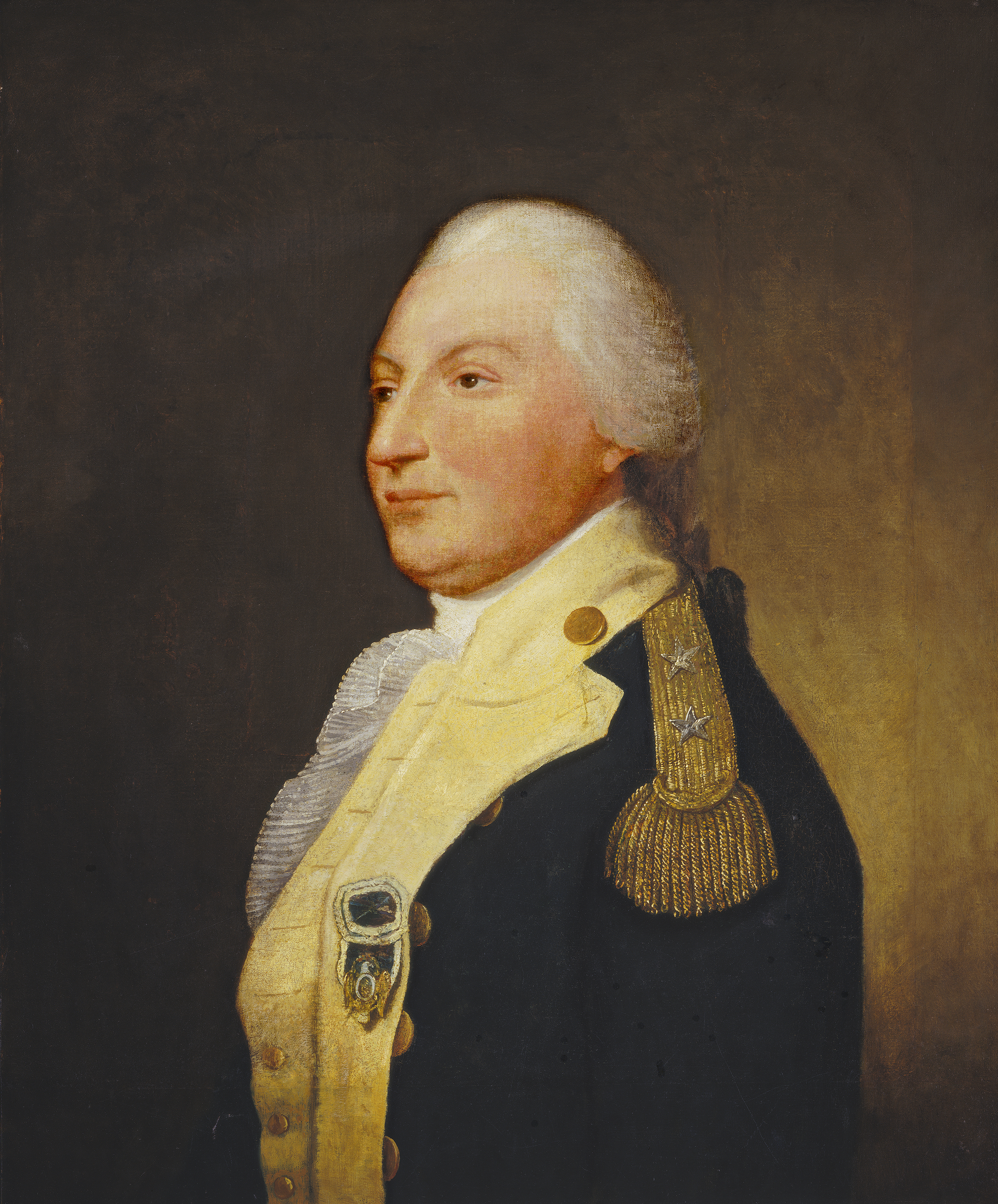
Nominee	William Smallwood
Party	Nonpartisan
Popular vote	1
Percentage	100.00%
Governor before election
William Smallwood
Nonpartisan
Elected Governor
William Smallwood
Nonpartisan

The 1787 Maryland gubernatorial election was held on November 22, 1787, in order to elect the Governor of Maryland. Incumbent Governor William Smallwood was easily re-elected by the Maryland General Assembly as he ran unopposed. The exact results of this election are unknown.

== General election ==
On election day, November 22, 1787, William Smallwood was re-elected by the Maryland General Assembly. Smallwood was sworn in for his third term on November 22, 1787.

=== Results ===
Maryland gubernatorial election, 1787
Party	Candidate	Votes	%
Nonpartisan	William Smallwood (incumbent)	1	100.00
Total votes		1	100.00
Nonpartisan hold			
