= 1784 Maryland gubernatorial election =

- November 24, 1784
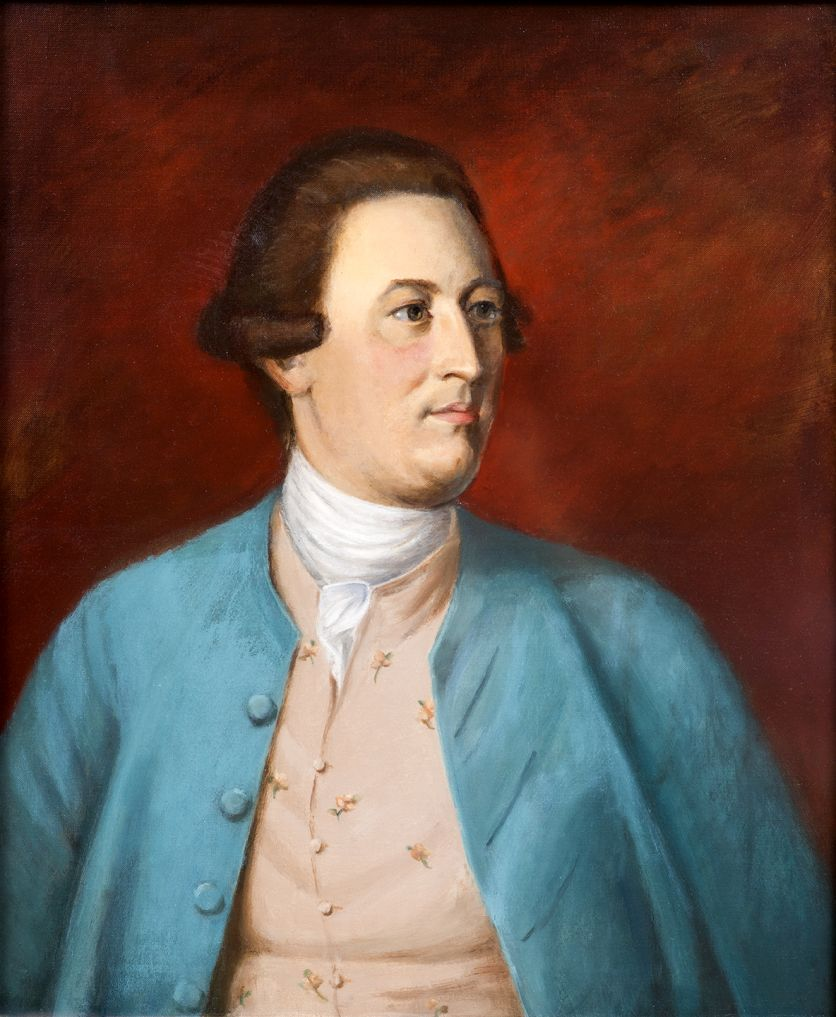
Nominee	William Paca
Party	Nonpartisan
Popular vote	1
Percentage	100.00%
Governor before election
William Paca
Nonpartisan
Elected Governor
William Paca
Nonpartisan

The 1784 Maryland gubernatorial election was held on November 24, 1784, in order to elect the Governor of Maryland. Incumbent Governor William Paca was easily re-elected by the Maryland General Assembly as he ran unopposed. The exact results of this election are unknown.

== General election ==
On election day, November 24, 1784, William Paca was re-elected by the Maryland General Assembly. Paca was sworn in for his third term on November 24, 1784.

=== Results ===
Maryland gubernatorial election, 1784
Party	Candidate	Votes	%
Nonpartisan	William Paca (incumbent)	1	100.00
Total votes		1	100.00
Nonpartisan hold			
