= 1795 Maryland gubernatorial election =

- November 9, 1795
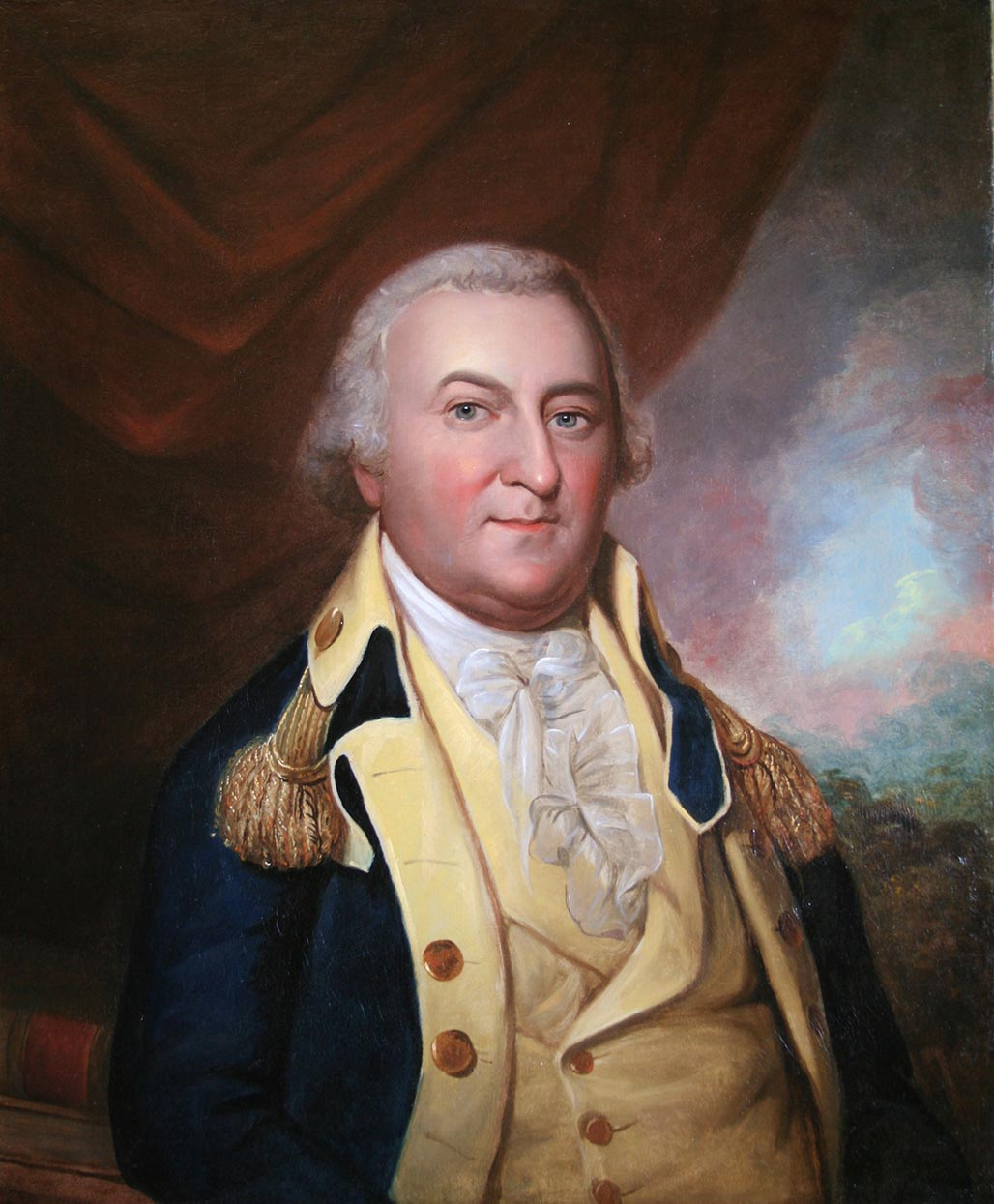
Nominee	John Hoskins Stone
Party	Federalist
Popular vote	1
Percentage	100.00%
Governor before election
John Hoskins Stone
Federalist
Elected Governor
John Hoskins Stone
Federalist

The 1795 Maryland gubernatorial election was held on November 9, 1795, in order to elect the Governor of Maryland. Incumbent Federalist Governor John Hoskins Stone was easily re-elected by the Maryland General Assembly as he ran unopposed. The exact results of this election are unknown.

== General election ==
On election day, November 9, 1795, incumbent Federalist Governor John Hoskins Stone was re-elected by the Maryland General Assembly, thereby retaining Federalist control over the office of governor. Stone was sworn in for his second term on November 9, 1795.

=== Results ===
Maryland gubernatorial election, 1795
Party	Candidate	Votes	%
Federalist	John Hoskins Stone (incumbent)	1	100.00
Total votes		1	100.00
Federalist hold			
