= 1836 Maryland gubernatorial election =

- January 4, 1836
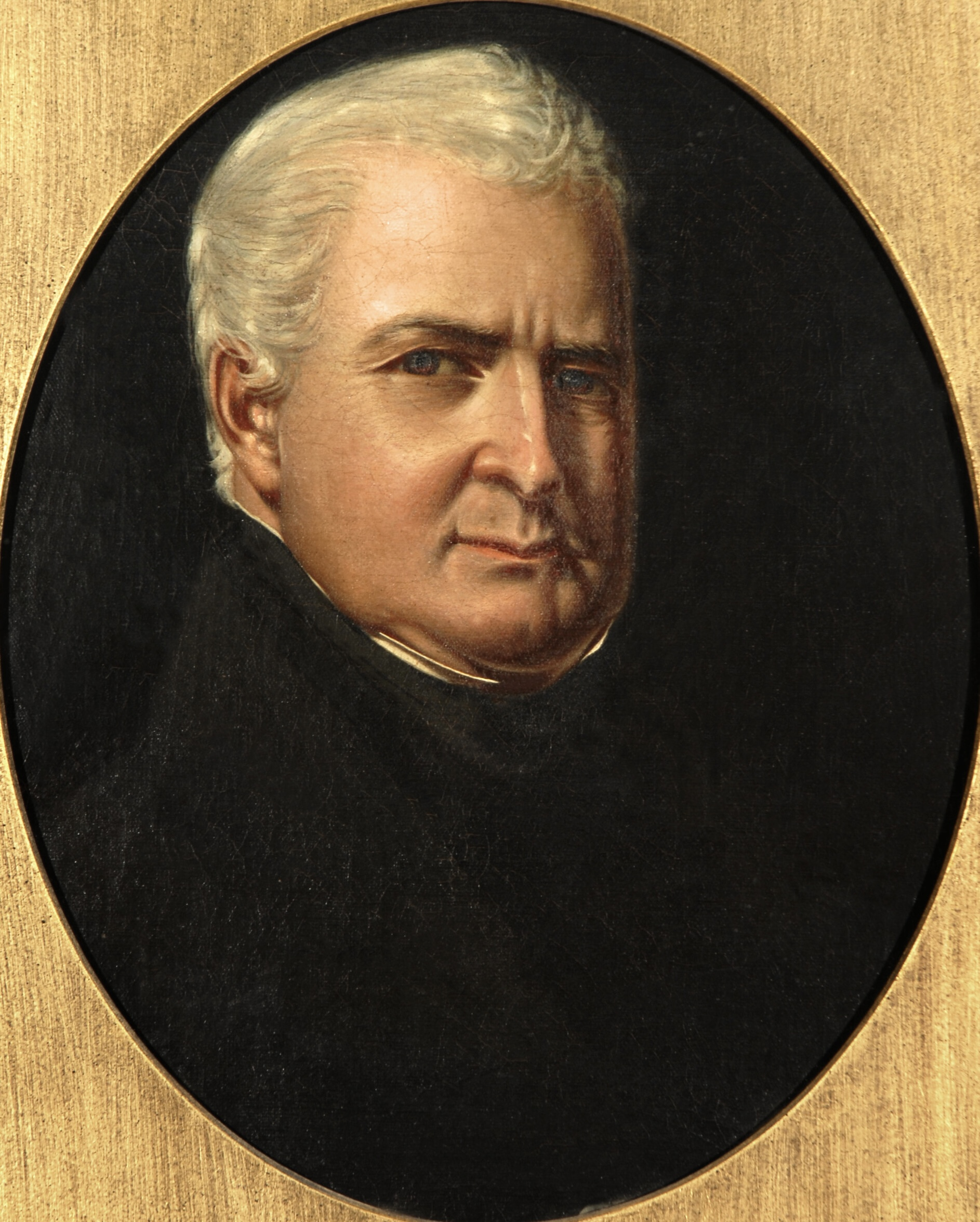
Nominee	Thomas Veazey
Party	Whig
Popular vote	53
Percentage	69.74%
Governor before election
James Thomas
National Republican
Elected Governor
Thomas Veazey
Whig

The 1836 Maryland gubernatorial election was held on January 4, 1836, in order to elect the Governor of Maryland. Whig nominee and former member of the Maryland House of Delegates Thomas Veazey was elected by the Maryland General Assembly as he ran unopposed.

== General election ==
On election day, January 4, 1836, Whig nominee Thomas Veazey was elected by the Maryland General Assembly, thereby gaining Whig control over the office of governor. Veazey was sworn in as the 24th Governor of Maryland on January 14, 1836.

=== Results ===
Maryland gubernatorial election, 1836
Party	Candidate	Votes	%
Whig	Thomas Veazey	53	69.74
	Did Not Vote	23	30.26
Total votes		76	100.00
Whig gain from National Republican			
