= 1781 Maryland gubernatorial election =

- November 19, 1781
Nominee	Thomas Sim Lee
Party	Nonpartisan
Popular vote	1
Percentage	100.00%
Governor before election
Thomas Sim Lee
Nonpartisan
Elected Governor
Thomas Sim Lee
Nonpartisan

The 1781 Maryland gubernatorial election was held on November 19, 1781, in order to elect the Governor of Maryland. Incumbent Governor Thomas Sim Lee was easily re-elected by the Maryland General Assembly as he ran unopposed. The exact results of this election are unknown.

== General election ==
On election day, November 19, 1781, Thomas Sim Lee was re-elected by the Maryland General Assembly. Lee was sworn in for his third term on November 20, 1781.

=== Results ===
Maryland gubernatorial election, 1781
Party	Candidate	Votes	%
Nonpartisan	Thomas Sim Lee (incumbent)	1	100.00
Total votes		1	100.00
Nonpartisan hold			
