= 1835 Connecticut lieutenant gubernatorial election =

- April 10, 1835

Nominee	Ebenezer Stoddard	Thaddeus Betts
Party	Democratic	Whig
Popular vote	21,296	18,470
Percentage	52.60%	45.60%
Lieutenant Governor before election
Thaddeus Betts
Whig
Elected Lieutenant Governor
Ebenezer Stoddard
Democratic

The 1835 Connecticut lieutenant gubernatorial election was held on April 10, 1835, in order to elect the lieutenant governor of Connecticut. Democratic nominee and former lieutenant governor Ebenezer Stoddard won the election against incumbent Whig lieutenant governor Thaddeus Betts in a rematch of the previous election.

== General election ==
On election day, April 10, 1835, Democratic nominee and former lieutenant governor Ebenezer Stoddard won the election with 52.60% of the vote, thereby gaining Democratic control over the office of lieutenant governor. Stoddard was sworn in for his second non-consecutive term on May 6, 1835.

=== Results ===
Connecticut lieutenant gubernatorial election, 1835
Party	Candidate	Votes	%
Democratic	Ebenezer Stoddard	21,296	52.60
Whig	Thaddeus Betts (incumbent)	18,470	45.60
	Scattering	682	1.80
Total votes		40,517	100.00
Democratic gain from Whig			
