= 1840 Connecticut lieutenant gubernatorial election =

- April 1, 1840
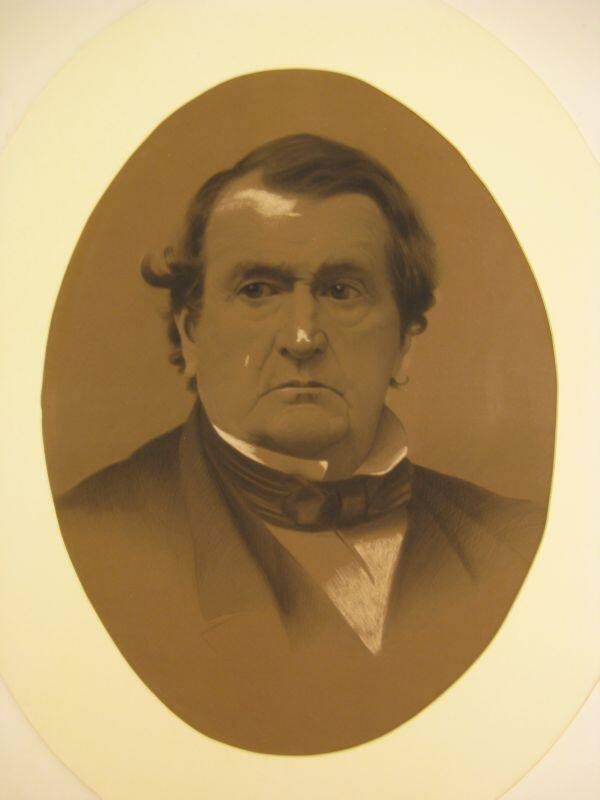

Nominee	Charles Hawley	John Stewart
Party	Whig	Democratic
Popular vote	29,651	25,373
Percentage	53.10%	45.40%
Lieutenant Governor before election
Charles Hawley
Whig
Elected Lieutenant Governor
Charles Hawley
Whig

The 1840 Connecticut lieutenant gubernatorial election was held on April 1, 1840, to elect the lieutenant governor of Connecticut. Incumbent Whig lieutenant governor Charles Hawley won re-election against Democratic nominee and former member of the Connecticut Senate John Stewart in a rematch of the previous election.

== General election ==
On election day, April 1, 1840, incumbent Whig lieutenant governor Charles Hawley won re-election with 53.10% of the vote, thereby retaining Whig control over the office of lieutenant governor. Hawley was sworn in for his third term on May 6, 1840.

=== Results ===
Connecticut lieutenant gubernatorial election, 1840
Party	Candidate	Votes	%
Whig	Charles Hawley (incumbent)	29,651	53.10
Democratic	John Stewart	25,373	45.40
	Scattering	287	1.50
Total votes		55,873	100.00
Whig hold			
