= 1871 Connecticut lieutenant gubernatorial election =

- April 3, 1871

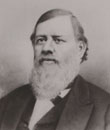
Nominee	Morris Tyler	Julius Hotchkiss
Party	Republican	Democratic
Popular vote	47,598	47,263
Percentage	50.18%	49.82%
Lieutenant Governor before election
Julius Hotchkiss
Democratic
Elected Lieutenant Governor
Morris Tyler
Republican

The 1871 Connecticut lieutenant gubernatorial election was held on April 3, 1871, to elect the lieutenant governor of Connecticut. Republican nominee Morris Tyler won the election against incumbent Democratic lieutenant governor Julius Hotchkiss in a rematch of the previous election.

== General election ==
On election day, April 3, 1871, Republican nominee Morris Tyler won the election with 50.18% of the vote, thereby gaining Republican control over the office of lieutenant governor. Tyler was sworn in as the 56th lieutenant governor of Connecticut on May 16, 1871.

=== Results ===
Connecticut lieutenant gubernatorial election, 1871
Party	Candidate	Votes	%
Republican	Morris Tyler	47,598	50.18
Democratic	Julius Hotchkiss (incumbent)	47,263	49.82
Total votes		94,861	100.00
Republican gain from Democratic			
