= 1938 Connecticut lieutenant gubernatorial election =

- November 8, 1938
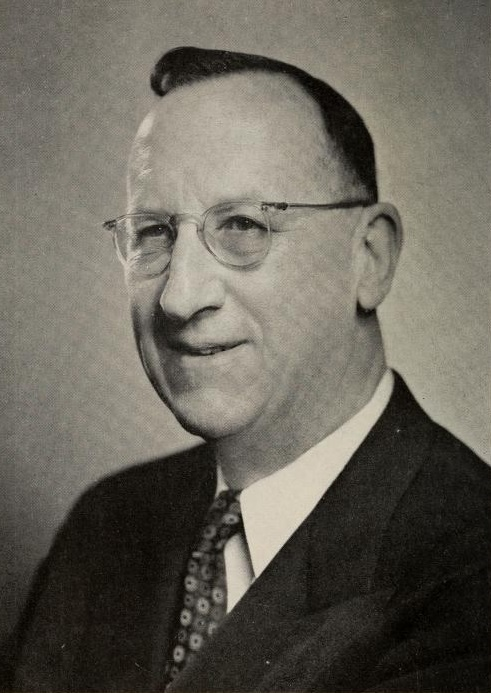

Nominee	James L. McConaughy	Thomas Hewes	Martin F. Plunkett
Party	Republican	Democratic	Socialist
Popular vote	265,240	246,068	109,434
Percentage	42.70%	39.60%	17.70%
Lieutenant Governor before election
T. Frank Hayes
Democratic
Elected Lieutenant Governor
James L. McConaughy
Republican

The 1938 Connecticut lieutenant gubernatorial election was held on November 8, 1938, to elect the lieutenant governor of Connecticut. Republican nominee James L. McConaughy won the election against Democratic nominee and former nominee for lieutenant governor Thomas Hewes and Socialist nominee Martin F. Plunkett.

== General election ==
On election day, November 8, 1938, Republican nominee James L. McConaughy won the election with 42.70% of the vote, thereby gaining Republican control over the office of lieutenant governor. McConaughy was sworn in as the 85th lieutenant governor of Connecticut on January 4, 1939.

=== Results ===
Connecticut lieutenant gubernatorial election, 1938
Party	Candidate	Votes	%
Republican	James L. McConaughy	265,240	42.70
Democratic	Thomas Hewes	246,068	39.60
Socialist	Martin F. Plunkett	109,434	17.70
Total votes		620,742	100.00
Republican gain from Democratic			
