= 1873 Connecticut lieutenant gubernatorial election =

- April 7, 1873
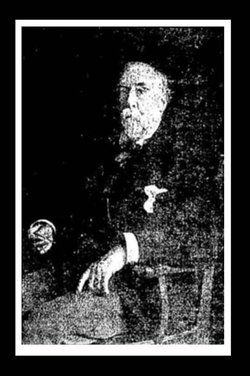

Nominee	George G. Sill	Charles L. Griswold
Party	Democratic	Republican
Popular vote	44,168	40,226
Percentage	50.80%	46.30%
Lieutenant Governor before election
Morris Tyler
Republican
Elected Lieutenant Governor
George G. Sill
Democratic

The 1873 Connecticut lieutenant gubernatorial election was held on April 7, 1873, to elect the lieutenant governor of Connecticut. Democratic nominee George G. Sill won the election against Republican nominee Charles L. Griswold and Prohibition nominee Abel L. Beardsley.

== General election ==
On election day, April 7, 1873, Democratic nominee George G. Sill won the election with 50.80% of the vote, thereby gaining Democratic control over the office of lieutenant governor. Sill was sworn in as the 57th lieutenant governor of Connecticut on May 7, 1873.

=== Results ===
Connecticut lieutenant gubernatorial election, 1873
Party	Candidate	Votes	%
Democratic	George G. Sill	44,168	50.80
Republican	Charles L. Griswold	40,226	46.30
Prohibition	Abel L. Beardsley	2,524	2.90
	Scattering	15	0.00
Total votes		86,934	100.00
Democratic gain from Republican			
