= 1934 Connecticut lieutenant gubernatorial election =

- November 6, 1934

Nominee	T. Frank Hayes	Roy C. Wilcox
Party	Democratic	Republican
Popular vote	262,455	249,701
Percentage	51.30%	48.70%
Lieutenant Governor before election
Roy C. Wilcox
Republican
Elected Lieutenant Governor
T. Frank Hayes
Democratic

The 1934 Connecticut lieutenant gubernatorial election was held on November 6, 1934, to elect the lieutenant governor of Connecticut. Democratic nominee and incumbent Mayor of Waterbury T. Frank Hayes won the election against incumbent Republican lieutenant governor Roy C. Wilcox.

== General election ==
On election day, November 6, 1934, Democratic nominee T. Frank Hayes won the election with 51.30% of the vote, thereby gaining Democratic control over the office of lieutenant governor. Hayes was sworn in as the 84th lieutenant governor of Connecticut on January 9, 1935.

=== Results ===
Connecticut lieutenant gubernatorial election, 1934
Party	Candidate	Votes	%
Democratic	T. Frank Hayes	262,455	51.30
Republican	Roy C. Wilcox (incumbent)	249,701	48.70
Total votes		512,155	100.00
Democratic gain from Republican			
