= 1831 Connecticut lieutenant gubernatorial election =

- April 8, 1831
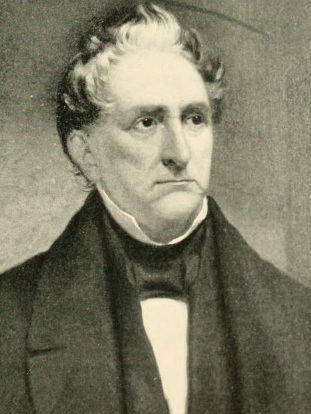

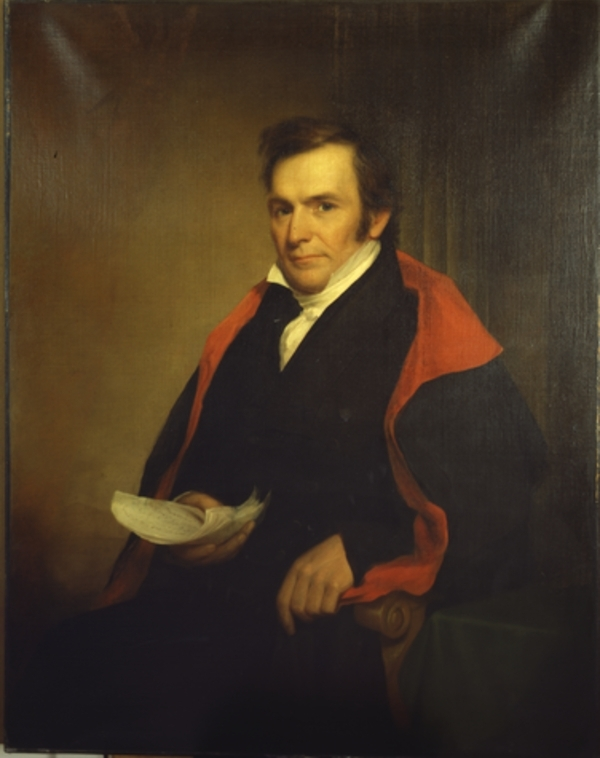
Nominee	Henry W. Edwards	Orange Merwin	Eli Ives
Party	Democratic	National Republican	Independent
Popular vote	7,670	6,670	3,794
Percentage	41.50%	36.10%	20.50%
Lieutenant Governor before election
Vacant
Elected Lieutenant Governor
Vacant

The 1831 Connecticut lieutenant gubernatorial election was held on April 8, 1831, in order to elect the lieutenant governor of Connecticut. Democratic candidate and former United States Senator from Connecticut Henry W. Edwards won a plurality of the vote against National Republican candidate Orange Merwin, Independent candidate Eli Ives and several others. However, since no candidate received a majority in the popular vote, the election was forwarded to the Connecticut General Assembly per the Connecticut Charter of 1662 to elect a winner. As the Assembly was divided over who should be elected as the new lieutenant governor, no person was elected and the office remained vacant until the next election.

== General election ==
On election day, April 8, 1831, Democratic candidate Henry W. Edwards won a plurality with 41.50% of the vote. However, as no candidate received a majority of the vote, the election was forwarded to the Connecticut General Assembly who ended up not electing a new lieutenant governor as they were too divided, leaving the office vacant until the next election.

=== Results ===
Connecticut lieutenant gubernatorial election, 1831
Party	Candidate	Votes	%
Democratic	Henry W. Edwards	7,670	41.50
National Republican	Orange Merwin	6,670	36.10
Independent	Eli Ives	3,794	20.50
	Scattering	342	1.90
Total votes		18,476	100.00
Vacant hold			
