= 1839 Connecticut lieutenant gubernatorial election =

- April 2, 1839
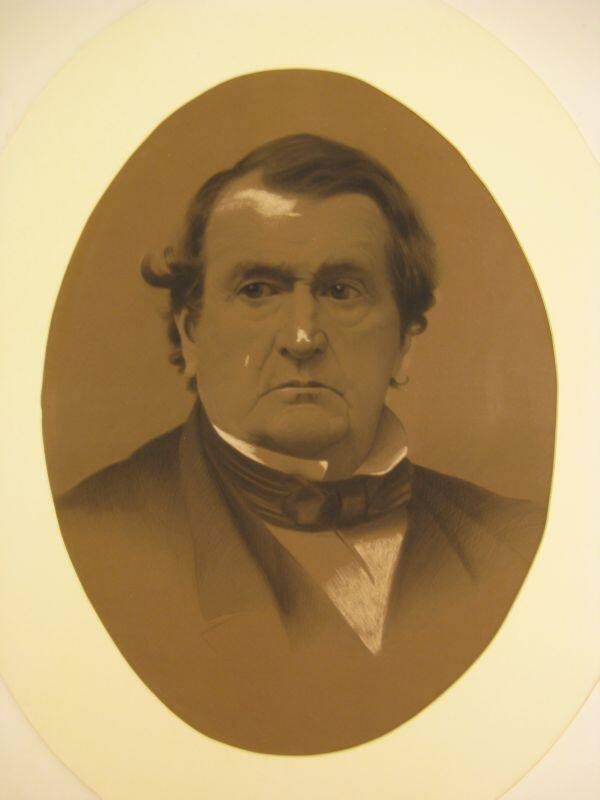

| Nominee | Charles Hawley | John Stewart |
| Party | Whig | Democratic |
| Popular vote | 26,245 | 23,894 |
| Percentage | 51.20% | 46.60% |
Lieutenant Governor before election
Charles Hawley
Whig
Elected Lieutenant Governor
Charles Hawley
Whig

The 1839 Connecticut lieutenant gubernatorial election was held on April 2, 1839, to elect the lieutenant governor of Connecticut. Incumbent Whig lieutenant governor Charles Hawley won re-election against Democratic nominee and former member of the Connecticut Senate John Stewart in a rematch of the previous election.

== General election ==
On election day, April 2, 1839, incumbent Whig lieutenant governor Charles Hawley won re-election with 51.20% of the vote, thereby retaining Whig control over the office of lieutenant governor. Hawley was sworn in for his second term on May 1, 1839.

=== Results ===
Connecticut lieutenant gubernatorial election, 1839
| Party | Candidate | Votes | % |
|---|---|---|---|
| Whig | Charles Hawley (incumbent) | 26,245 | 51.20 |
| Democratic | John Stewart | 23,894 | 46.60 |
| | Scattering | 1,101 | 2.20 |
| Total votes | | 51,241 | 100.00 |
| Whig hold | | | |
