= 1838 Connecticut lieutenant gubernatorial election =

- April 4, 1838
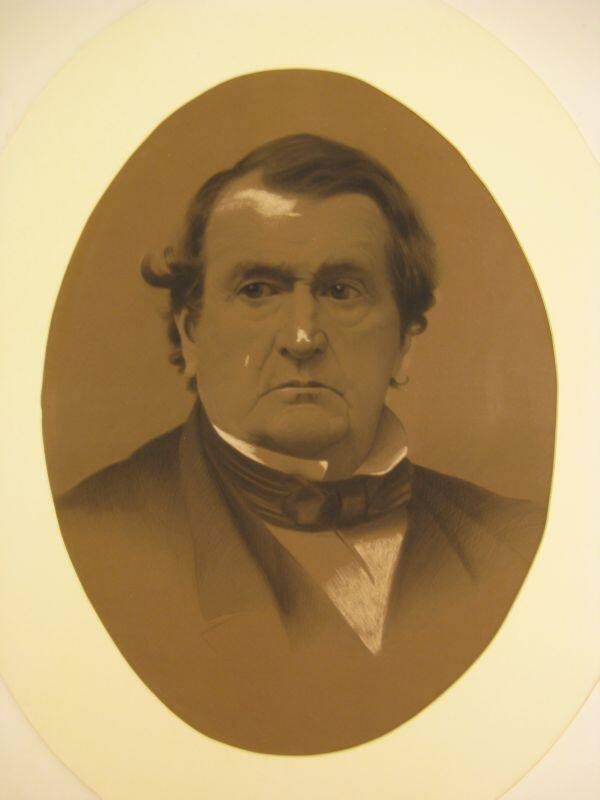

Nominee	Charles Hawley	John Stewart
Party	Whig	Democratic
Popular vote	27,076	21,449
Percentage	54.10%	42.80%
Lieutenant Governor before election
Ebenezer Stoddard
Democratic
Elected Lieutenant Governor
Charles Hawley
Whig

The 1838 Connecticut lieutenant gubernatorial election was held on April 4, 1838, to elect the lieutenant governor of Connecticut. Whig nominee and incumbent member of the Connecticut Senate Charles Hawley won the election against Democratic nominee and former member of the Connecticut Senate John Stewart.

== General election ==
On election day, April 4, 1838, Whig nominee Charles Hawley won the election with 54.10% of the vote, thereby gaining Whig control over the office of lieutenant governor. Hawley was sworn in as the 36th lieutenant governor of Connecticut on May 2, 1838.

=== Results ===
Connecticut lieutenant gubernatorial election, 1838
Party	Candidate	Votes	%
Whig	Charles Hawley	27,076	54.10
Democratic	John Stewart	21,449	42.80
	Scattering	1,538	3.10
Total votes		50,063	100.00
Whig gain from Democratic			
