= 1875 Connecticut lieutenant gubernatorial election =

- April 5, 1875
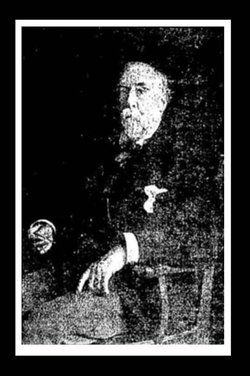

Nominee	George G. Sill	Charles L. English
Party	Democratic	Republican
Popular vote	53,246	45,024
Percentage	52.60%	44.50%
Lieutenant Governor before election
George G. Sill
Democratic
Elected Lieutenant Governor
George G. Sill
Democratic

The 1875 Connecticut lieutenant gubernatorial election was held on April 5, 1875, to elect the lieutenant governor of Connecticut. Incumbent Democratic lieutenant governor George G. Sill won re-election against Republican nominee Charles L. English and Prohibition nominee Jesse G. Baldwin.

== General election ==
On election day, April 5, 1875, incumbent Democratic lieutenant governor George G. Sill won re-election with 52.60% of the vote, thereby retaining Democratic control over the office of lieutenant governor. Sill was sworn in for his third term on May 5, 1875.

=== Results ===
Connecticut lieutenant gubernatorial election, 1875
Party	Candidate	Votes	%
Democratic	George G. Sill (incumbent)	53,246	52.60
Republican	Charles L. English	45,024	44.50
Prohibition	Jesse G. Baldwin	2,923	2.90
	Scattering	4	0.00
Total votes		101,199	100.00
Democratic hold			
