= 1837 Connecticut lieutenant gubernatorial election =

- April 5, 1837

Nominee	Ebenezer Stoddard	Benjamin Isaacs
Party	Democratic	Whig
Popular vote	23,853	21,399
Percentage	52.70%	47.30%
Lieutenant Governor before election
Ebenezer Stoddard
Democratic
Elected Lieutenant Governor
Ebenezer Stoddard
Democratic

The 1837 Connecticut lieutenant gubernatorial election was held on April 5, 1837, in order to elect the lieutenant governor of Connecticut. Incumbent Democratic lieutenant governor Ebenezer Stoddard won re-election against Whig nominee and incumbent member of the Connecticut Senate Benjamin Isaacs.

== General election ==
On election day, April 5, 1837, incumbent Democratic lieutenant governor Ebenezer Stoddard won re-election with 52.70% of the vote, thereby retaining Democratic control over the office of lieutenant governor. Stoddard was sworn in for his fourth term on May 3, 1837.

=== Results ===
Connecticut lieutenant gubernatorial election, 1837
Party	Candidate	Votes	%
Democratic	Ebenezer Stoddard (incumbent)	23,853	52.70
Whig	Benjamin Isaacs	21,399	47.30
	Scattering	8	0.00
Total votes		45,260	100.00
Democratic hold			
