= 1936 Connecticut lieutenant gubernatorial election =

- November 3, 1936

Nominee	T. Frank Hayes	Albert E. Lavery
Party	Democratic	Republican
Popular vote	375,292	282,579
Percentage	57.10%	42.90%
Lieutenant Governor before election
T. Frank Hayes
Democratic
Elected Lieutenant Governor
T. Frank Hayes
Democratic

The 1936 Connecticut lieutenant gubernatorial election was held on November 3, 1936, to elect the lieutenant governor of Connecticut. Incumbent Democratic lieutenant governor T. Frank Hayes won re-election against Republican nominee and former member of the Connecticut Senate Albert E. Lavery.

== General election ==
On election day, November 3, 1936, incumbent Democratic lieutenant governor T. Frank Hayes won re-election with 57.10% of the vote, thereby retaining Democratic control over the office of lieutenant governor. Hayes was sworn in for his second term on January 6, 1937.

=== Results ===
Connecticut lieutenant gubernatorial election, 1936
Party	Candidate	Votes	%
Democratic	T. Frank Hayes (incumbent)	375,292	57.10
Republican	Albert E. Lavery	282,579	42.90
Total votes		657,871	100.00
Democratic hold			
