= 1874 Connecticut lieutenant gubernatorial election =

- April 6, 1874
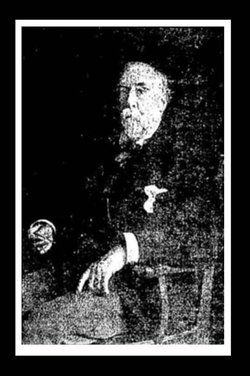

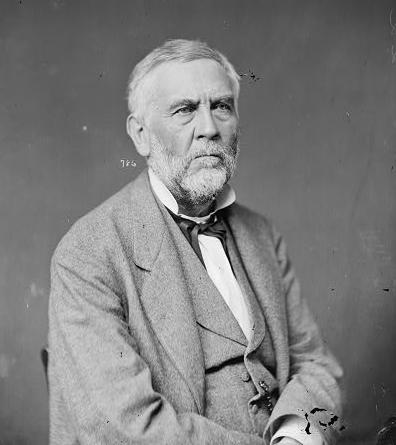
Nominee	George G. Sill	John T. Wait
Party	Democratic	Republican
Popular vote	46,315	40,274
Percentage	50.60%	44.00%
Lieutenant Governor before election
George G. Sill
Democratic
Elected Lieutenant Governor
George G. Sill
Democratic

The 1874 Connecticut lieutenant gubernatorial election was held on April 6, 1874, to elect the lieutenant governor of Connecticut. Incumbent Democratic lieutenant governor George G. Sill won re-election against Republican nominee and former Presidents pro tempore of the Connecticut Senate John T. Wait and Prohibition nominee Jesse G. Baldwin.

== General election ==
On election day, April 6, 1874, incumbent Democratic lieutenant governor George G. Sill won re-election with 50.60% of the vote, thereby retaining Democratic control over the office of lieutenant governor. Sill was sworn in for his second term on May 6, 1874.

=== Results ===
Connecticut lieutenant gubernatorial election, 1874
Party	Candidate	Votes	%
Democratic	George G. Sill (incumbent)	46,315	50.60
Republican	John T. Wait	40,274	44.00
Prohibition	Jesse G. Baldwin	4,902	5.40
	Scattering	32	0.00
Total votes		91,525	100.00
Democratic hold			
