= 1870 Connecticut lieutenant gubernatorial election =

- April 4, 1870
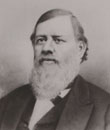

Nominee	Julius Hotchkiss	Morris Tyler
Party	Democratic	Republican
Popular vote	44,135	43,219
Percentage	50.50%	49.50%
Lieutenant Governor before election
Francis Wayland III
Republican
Elected Lieutenant Governor
Julius Hotchkiss
Democratic

The 1870 Connecticut lieutenant gubernatorial election was held on April 4, 1870, to elect the lieutenant governor of Connecticut. Democratic nominee and former member of the U.S. House of Representatives from Connecticut's 2nd district Julius Hotchkiss won the election against Republican nominee and former Mayor of New Haven Morris Tyler.

== General election ==
On election day, April 4, 1870, Democratic nominee Julius Hotchkiss won the election with 50.50% of the vote, thereby gaining Democratic control over the office of lieutenant governor. Hotchkiss was sworn in as the 55th lieutenant governor of Connecticut on May 4, 1870.

=== Results ===
Connecticut lieutenant gubernatorial election, 1870
Party	Candidate	Votes	%
Democratic	Julius Hotchkiss	44,135	50.50
Republican	Morris Tyler	43,219	49.50
	Scattering	2	0.00
Total votes		87,356	100.00
Democratic gain from Republican			
