= 1836 Connecticut lieutenant gubernatorial election =

- April 6, 1836

Nominee	Ebenezer Stoddard	Ebenezer Young
Party	Democratic	Whig
Popular vote	18,725	15,070
Percentage	54.80%	44.10%
Lieutenant Governor before election
Ebenezer Stoddard
Democratic
Elected Lieutenant Governor
Ebenezer Stoddard
Democratic

The 1836 Connecticut lieutenant gubernatorial election was held on April 6, 1836, in order to elect the lieutenant governor of Connecticut. Incumbent Democratic lieutenant governor Ebenezer Stoddard won re-election against Whig nominee and former Speaker of the Connecticut House of Representatives Ebenezer Young.

== General election ==
On election day, April 6, 1836, incumbent Democratic lieutenant governor Ebenezer Stoddard won re-election with 54.80% of the vote, thereby retaining Democratic control over the office of lieutenant governor. Stoddard was sworn in for his third term on May 4, 1836.

=== Results ===
Connecticut lieutenant gubernatorial election, 1836
Party	Candidate	Votes	%
Democratic	Ebenezer Stoddard (incumbent)	18,725	54.80
Whig	Ebenezer Young	15,070	44.10
	Scattering	377	1.10
Total votes		34,172	100.00
Democratic hold			
