= April 1876 Connecticut lieutenant gubernatorial election =

- April 3, 1876
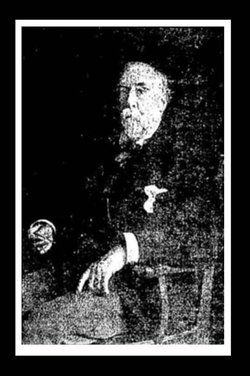

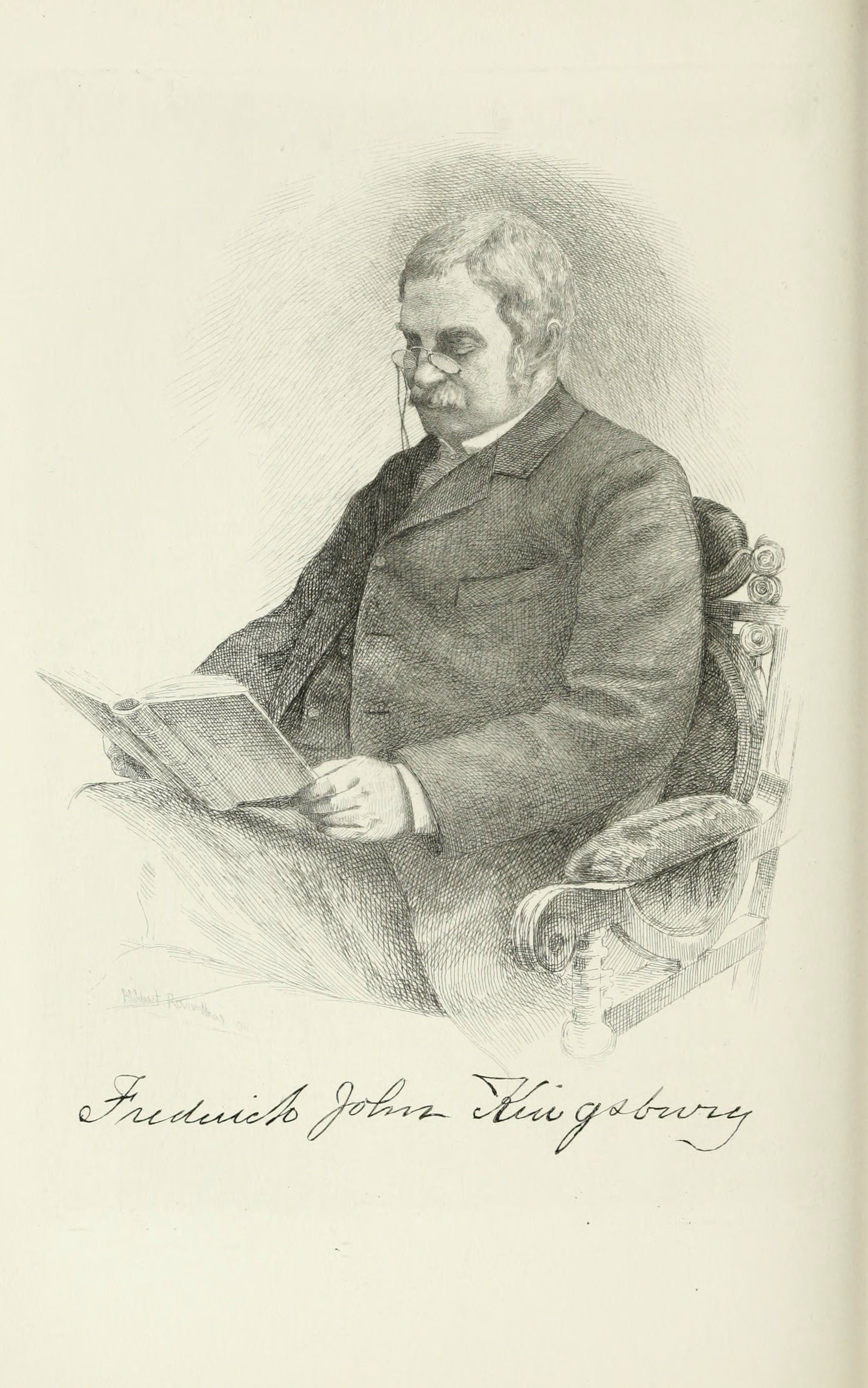
Nominee	George G. Sill	Frederick J. Kingsbury
Party	Democratic	Republican
Popular vote	50,920	43,702
Percentage	51.66%	44.33%
Lieutenant Governor before election
George G. Sill
Democratic
Elected Lieutenant Governor
George G. Sill
Democratic

The 1876 Connecticut lieutenant gubernatorial election was held on April 3, 1876, to elect the lieutenant governor of Connecticut. Incumbent Democratic lieutenant governor George G. Sill won re-election against Republican nominee Frederick J. Kingsbury, Greenback nominee and former United States Senator from Connecticut Francis Gillette and Prohibition nominee Jesse G. Baldwin. This was the last lieutenant gubernatorial election held in April due to a constitutional amendment moving the election schedule to November and lengthened terms to two years.

== General election ==
On election day, April 3, 1876, incumbent Democratic lieutenant governor George G. Sill won re-election with 51.66% of the vote, thereby retaining Democratic control over the office of lieutenant governor. Sill was sworn in for his fourth term on May 3, 1876.

=== Results ===
Connecticut lieutenant gubernatorial election, April 1876
Party	Candidate	Votes	%
Democratic	George G. Sill (incumbent)	50,920	51.66
Republican	Frederick J. Kingsbury	43,702	44.33
Greenback	Francis Gillette	1,999	2.03
Prohibition	Jesse G. Baldwin	1,903	1.93
	Scattering	53	0.05
Total votes		98,577	100.00
Democratic hold			
