= 1932 Connecticut lieutenant gubernatorial election =

- November 8, 1932

Nominee	Roy C. Wilcox	Thomas Hewes
Party	Republican	Democratic
Popular vote	283,688	283,300
Percentage	50.03%	49.97%
Lieutenant Governor before election
Samuel R. Spencer
Republican
Elected Lieutenant Governor
Roy C. Wilcox
Republican

The 1932 Connecticut lieutenant gubernatorial election was held on November 8, 1932, to elect the lieutenant governor of Connecticut. Republican nominee and incumbent Connecticut State Treasurer Roy C. Wilcox won the election against Democratic nominee and former member of the Connecticut House of Representatives Thomas Hewes.

== General election ==
On election day, November 8, 1932, Republican nominee Roy C. Wilcox won the election with 50.03% of the vote, thereby retaining Republican control over the office of lieutenant governor. Wilcox was sworn in as the 83rd lieutenant governor of Connecticut on January 4, 1933.

=== Results ===
Connecticut lieutenant gubernatorial election, 1932
Party	Candidate	Votes	%
Republican	Roy C. Wilcox	283,688	50.03
Democratic	Thomas Hewes	283,300	49.97
Total votes		566,988	100.00
Republican hold			
