= 1834 Connecticut lieutenant gubernatorial election =

- April 11, 1834

Nominee	Thaddeus Betts	Ebenezer Stoddard	John M. Holley
Party	Whig	Democratic	Independent
Popular vote	16,312	12,972	2,050
Percentage	51.50%	41.00%	6.50%
Lieutenant Governor before election
Ebenezer Stoddard
Democratic
Elected Lieutenant Governor
Thaddeus Betts
Whig

The 1834 Connecticut lieutenant gubernatorial election was held on April 11, 1834, in order to elect the lieutenant governor of Connecticut. Whig nominee and former lieutenant governor Thaddeus Betts won the election against incumbent Democratic lieutenant governor Ebenezer Stoddard, Independent candidate John M. Holley and several others.

== General election ==
On election day, April 11, 1834, Whig nominee and former lieutenant governor Thaddeus Betts won the election with 51.50% of the vote, thereby gaining Whig control over the office of lieutenant governor. Betts was sworn in for his second non-consecutive term on May 7, 1834.

=== Results ===
Connecticut lieutenant gubernatorial election, 1834
Party	Candidate	Votes	%
Whig	Thaddeus Betts	16,312	51.50
Democratic	Ebenezer Stoddard (incumbent)	12,972	41.00
Independent	John M. Holley	2,050	6.50
	Scattering	222	1.00
Total votes		31,660	100.00
Whig gain from Democratic			
