= 1872 Connecticut lieutenant gubernatorial election =

- April 1, 1872

Nominee	Morris Tyler	Charles Atwater
Party	Republican	Democratic
Popular vote	46,678	44,268
Percentage	50.30%	47.70%
Lieutenant Governor before election
Morris Tyler
Republican
Elected Lieutenant Governor
Morris Tyler
Republican

The 1872 Connecticut lieutenant gubernatorial election was held on April 1, 1872, to elect the lieutenant governor of Connecticut. Incumbent Republican lieutenant governor Morris Tyler won re-election against Democratic nominee and former member of the Connecticut Senate Charles Atwater and Prohibition nominee Abel L. Beardsley.

== General election ==
On election day, April 1, 1872, incumbent Republican lieutenant governor Morris Tyler won re-election with 50.30% of the vote, thereby retaining Republican control over the office of lieutenant governor. Tyler was sworn in for his second term on May 1, 1872.

=== Results ===
Connecticut lieutenant gubernatorial election, 1872
Party	Candidate	Votes	%
Republican	Morris Tyler (incumbent)	46,678	50.30
Democratic	Charles Atwater	44,268	47.70
Prohibition	Abel L. Beardsley	1,463	1.60
	Scattering	430	0.40
Total votes		92,839	100.00
Republican hold			
