= 1930 Connecticut lieutenant gubernatorial election =

- November 4, 1930
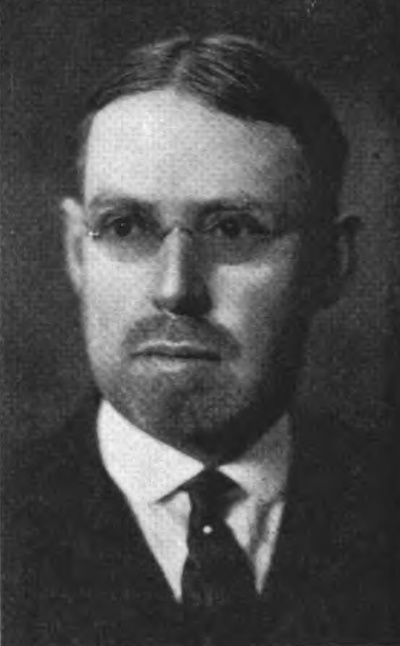

Nominee	Samuel R. Spencer	Daniel J. Leary
Party	Republican	Democratic
Popular vote	215,494	208,673
Percentage	50.80%	49.20%
Lieutenant Governor before election
Ernest E. Rogers
Republican
Elected Lieutenant Governor
Samuel R. Spencer
Republican

The 1930 Connecticut lieutenant gubernatorial election was held on November 4, 1930, to elect the lieutenant governor of Connecticut. Republican nominee and incumbent Connecticut State Treasurer Samuel R. Spencer won the election against Democratic nominee Daniel J. Leary.

== General election ==
On election day, November 4, 1930, Republican nominee Samuel R. Spencer won the election with 50.80% of the vote, thereby retaining Republican control over the office of lieutenant governor. Spencer was sworn in as the 82nd lieutenant governor of Connecticut on January 7, 1931.

=== Results ===
Connecticut lieutenant gubernatorial election, 1930
Party	Candidate	Votes	%
Republican	Samuel R. Spencer	215,494	50.80
Democratic	Daniel J. Leary	208,673	49.20
Total votes		424,167	100.00
Republican hold			
