= 1815 Connecticut lieutenant gubernatorial election =

- April 10, 1815
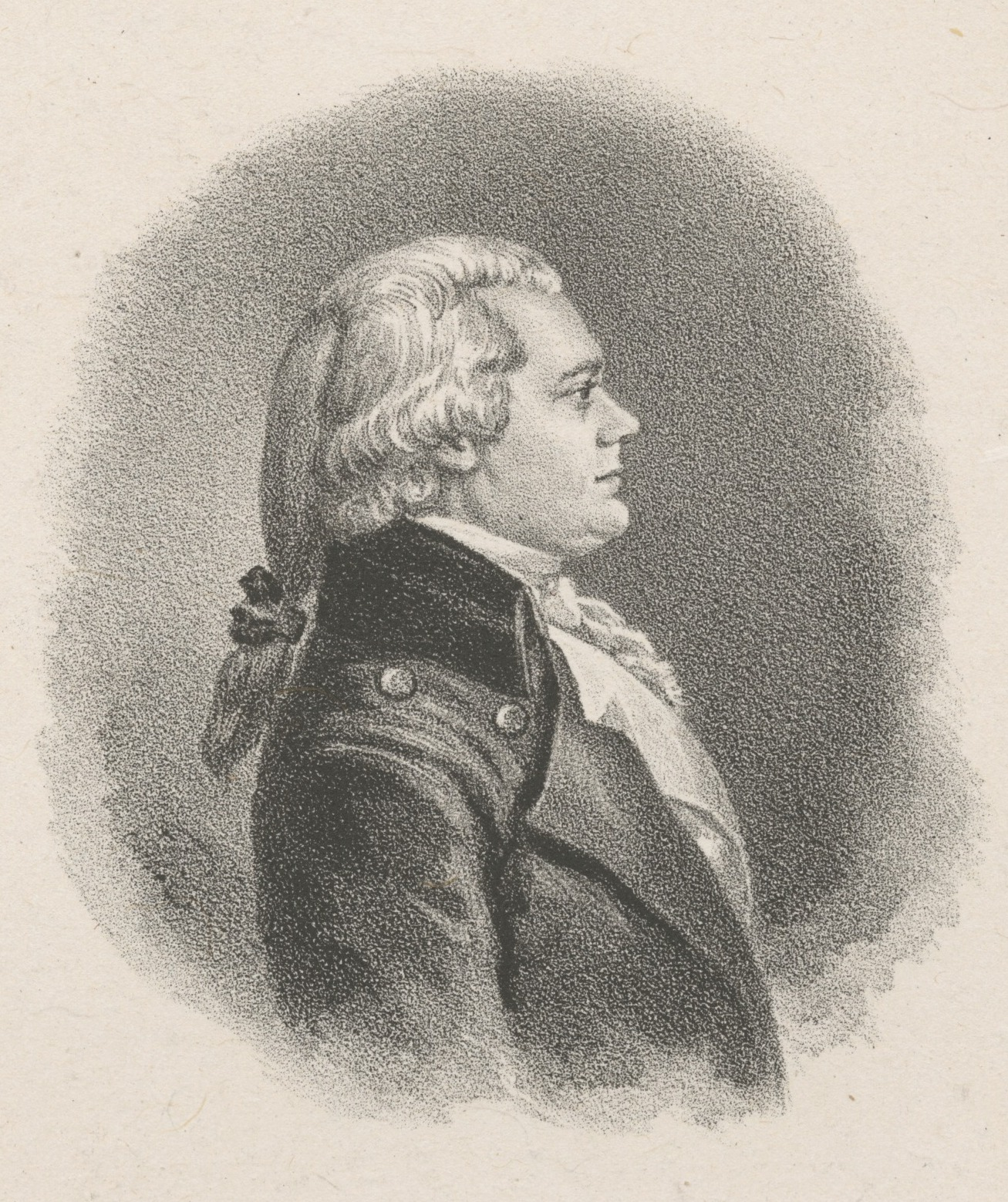

Nominee	Chauncey Goodrich	Isaac Spencer
Party	Federalist	Democratic-Republican
Popular vote	6,399	3,129
Percentage	61.70%	30.20%
Lieutenant Governor before election
Chauncey Goodrich
Federalist
Elected Lieutenant Governor
Chauncey Goodrich
Federalist

The 1815 Connecticut lieutenant gubernatorial election was held on April 10, 1815, in order to elect the lieutenant governor of Connecticut. Incumbent Federalist lieutenant governor Chauncey Goodrich defeated Democratic-Republican candidate Isaac Spencer in a rematch of the previous election.

== General election ==
On election day, April 10, 1815, incumbent Federalist lieutenant governor Chauncey Goodrich won re-election by a margin of 3,270 votes against his opponent Democratic-Republican candidate Isaac Spencer, thereby retaining Federalist control over the office of lieutenant governor. Goodrich was sworn in for his third term on May 11, 1815.

=== Results ===
Connecticut lieutenant gubernatorial election, 1815
Party	Candidate	Votes	%
Federalist	Chauncey Goodrich (incumbent)	6,399	61.70
Democratic-Republican	Isaac Spencer	3,129	30.20
	Scattering	850	8.10
Total votes		10,378	100.00
Federalist hold			
