= 1841 Connecticut lieutenant gubernatorial election =

- April 7, 1841
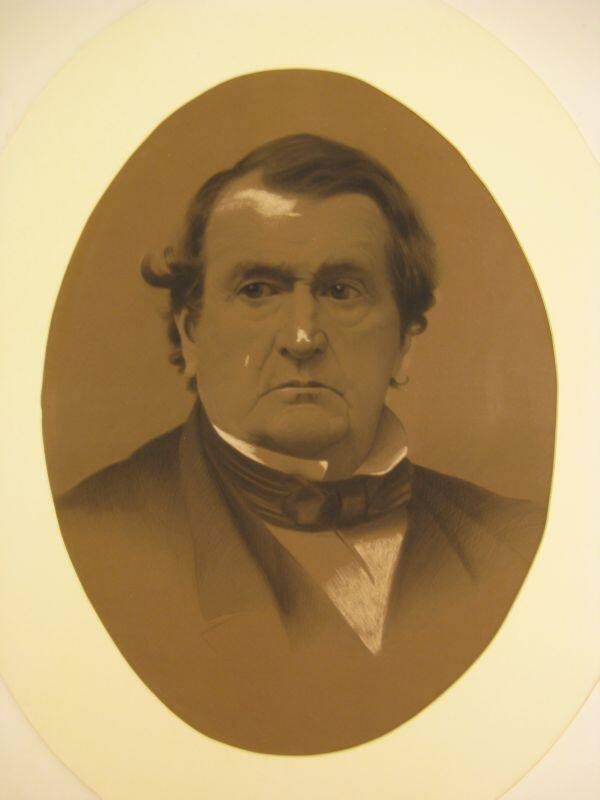

| Nominee | Charles Hawley | Benjamin Pinney |
| Party | Whig | Democratic |
| Popular vote | 26,832 | 21,373 |
| Percentage | 55.10% | 43.90% |
Lieutenant Governor before election
Charles Hawley
Whig
Elected Lieutenant Governor
Charles Hawley
Whig

The 1841 Connecticut lieutenant gubernatorial election was held on April 7, 1841, to elect the lieutenant governor of Connecticut. Incumbent Whig lieutenant governor Charles Hawley won re-election against Democratic nominee and former member of the Connecticut Senate Benjamin Pinney.

== General election ==
On election day, April 7, 1841, incumbent Whig lieutenant governor Charles Hawley won re-election with 55.10% of the vote, thereby retaining Whig control over the office of lieutenant governor. Hawley was sworn in for his fourth term on May 5, 1841.

=== Results ===
Connecticut lieutenant gubernatorial election, 1841
| Party | Candidate | Votes | % |
|---|---|---|---|
| Whig | Charles Hawley (incumbent) | 26,832 | 55.10 |
| Democratic | Benjamin Pinney | 21,373 | 43.90 |
| | Scattering | 529 | 1.00 |
| Total votes | | 48,734 | 100.00 |
| Whig hold | | | |
