= 1798 Connecticut lieutenant gubernatorial election =

- April 9, 1798
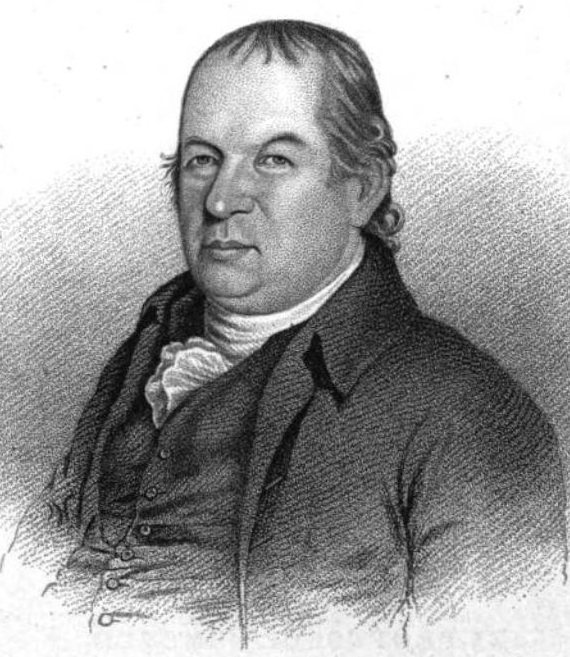

Nominee	John Treadwell	Jonathan Sturges	James Hillhouse
Party	Federalist		Federalist
Popular vote	2,842	1,070	1,025
Percentage	40.20%	15.10%	14.50%
Lieutenant Governor before election
Vacant
Elected Lieutenant Governor
John Treadwell
Federalist

The 1798 Connecticut lieutenant gubernatorial election was held on April 9, 1798, in order to elect the lieutenant governor of Connecticut. Federalist candidate John Treadwell won a plurality of the vote against candidate and former member of the U.S. House of Representatives from Connecticut's at-large district Jonathan Sturges, fellow Federalist candidate and incumbent United States Senator from Connecticut James Hillhouse and other candidates. However, as no candidate received a majority of the total votes cast as was required by Connecticut law, the election was forwarded to the Connecticut legislature, who chose Treadwell as lieutenant governor.

== General election ==
On election day, April 9, 1798, Federalist candidate John Treadwell won the election after having been chosen by the Connecticut legislature, thereby retaining Federalist control over the office of lieutenant governor. Treadwell was sworn in as the 25th lieutenant governor of Connecticut on May 10, 1798.

=== Results ===
Connecticut lieutenant gubernatorial election, 1798
Party	Candidate	Votes	%
Federalist	John Treadwell	2,842	40.20
	Jonathan Sturges	1,070	15.10
Federalist	James Hillhouse	1,025	14.50
	Scattering	2,138	30.20
Total votes		7,075	100.00
Federalist hold			
