= 1832 Connecticut lieutenant gubernatorial election =

- April 13, 1832

Nominee	Thaddeus Betts	John M. Holley
Party	National Republican	Independent
Popular vote	8,055	3,383
Percentage	68.30%	28.70%
Lieutenant Governor before election
Vacant
Elected Lieutenant Governor
Thaddeus Betts
National Republican

The 1832 Connecticut lieutenant gubernatorial election was held on April 13, 1832, in order to elect the lieutenant governor of Connecticut. National Republican candidate and incumbent member of the Connecticut Senate Thaddeus Betts won the election against Independent candidate John M. Holley and several others.

== General election ==
On election day, April 13, 1832, National Republican candidate Thaddeus Betts won the election with 68.30% of the vote, thereby retaining National Republican control over the office of lieutenant governor. Betts was sworn in as the 32nd lieutenant governor of Connecticut on May 4, 1832.

=== Results ===
Connecticut lieutenant gubernatorial election, 1832
Party	Candidate	Votes	%
National Republican	Thaddeus Betts	8,055	68.30
Independent	John M. Holley	3,383	28.70
	Scattering	504	3.00
Total votes		11,802	100.00
National Republican hold			
