= List of lieutenant governors of Connecticut =

Lieutenant Governor of Connecticut
- Seal of the lieutenant governor

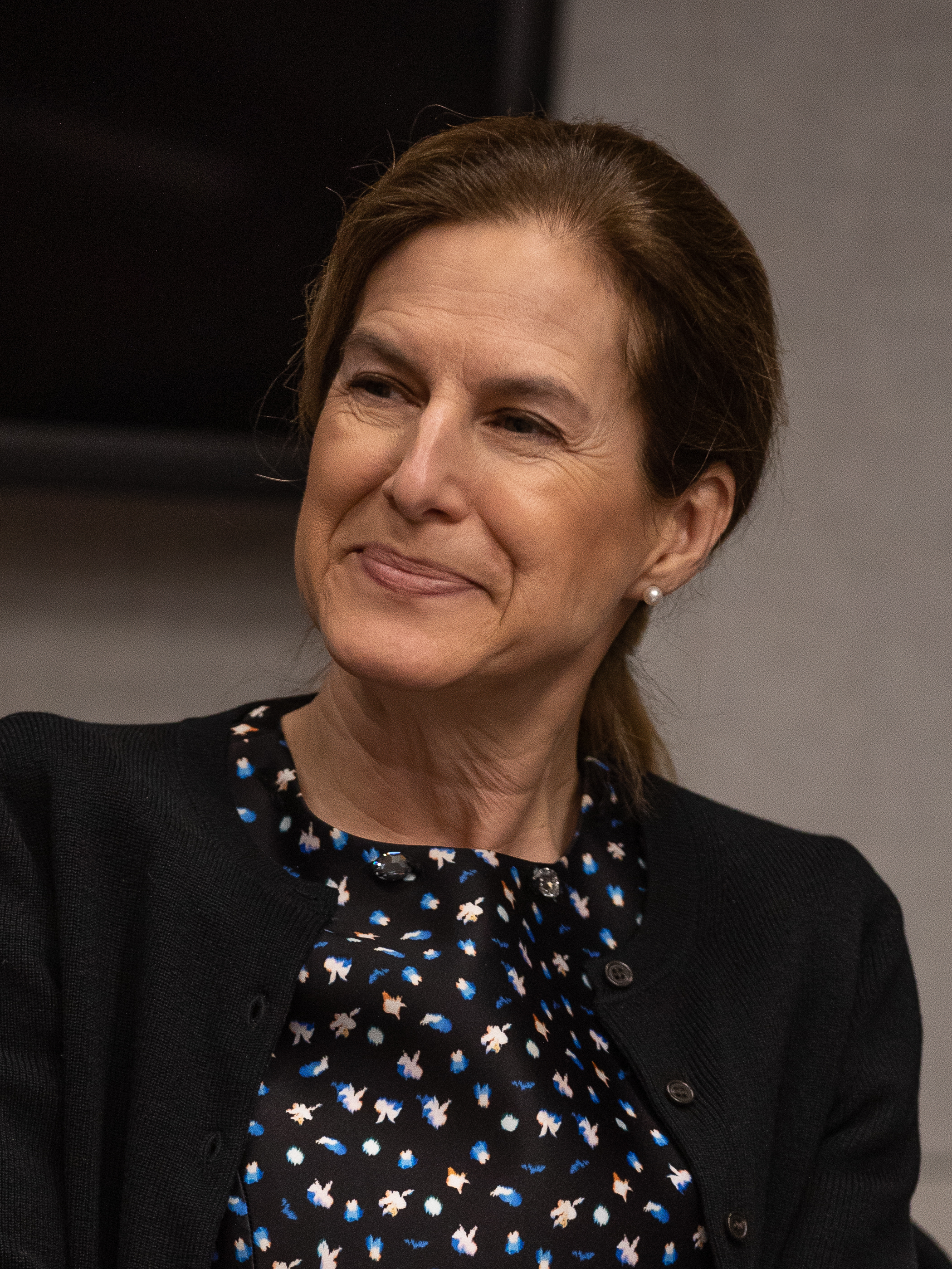
- Incumbent; Susan Bysiewicz since January 9, 2019
- Government of Connecticut
- Style: Her Excellency
- Term length: Four years, No term limits
- Precursor: Deputy Governor of Connecticut Colony
- Inaugural holder: Matthew Griswold State of Connecticut; 1776
- Formation: Constitution of Connecticut
- Succession: First
- Website: Office of the Lt. Governor

The lieutenant governor of Connecticut is the second highest executive officer of the government of the U.S. State of Connecticut. The lieutenant governor acts as President of the State Senate, presiding over the Senate and casting votes in the event of a tie. They are elected to serve four-year terms and run on the same ticket as the governor as running mate with no term limits. They are the first in the gubernatorial line of succession of Connecticut and serve as acting governor in the absence of the governor and as governor for the remainder of the term in the event the governor dies, resigns, or is removed from office.

The incumbent lieutenant governor is Democrat Susan Bysiewicz since 2019, after winning the 2018 gubernatorial election and winning reelection in the 2022 gubernatorial election. Her second and current term is set to expire on January 6, 2027.

== List of lieutenant governors ==
Lieutenant governors of the State of Connecticut
No.	Lieutenant Governor	Term in office	Party	Election	Governor (Note: The office of Lieutenant Governor was known as Deputy-Governor under the colonial charter, but the name 'Lieutenant Governor' was predominantly used after independence.) (Note: Lieutenant governors represented the same party as their governor unless noted.)
21	Matthew Griswold	October 10, 1776 – May 13, 1784	Federalist	1776	Jonathan Trumbull (Note: Represented no party.)
21	Matthew Griswold	October 10, 1776 – May 13, 1784	Federalist	1777	Jonathan Trumbull
21	Matthew Griswold	October 10, 1776 – May 13, 1784	Federalist	1778	Jonathan Trumbull
21	Matthew Griswold	October 10, 1776 – May 13, 1784	Federalist	1779	Jonathan Trumbull
21	Matthew Griswold	October 10, 1776 – May 13, 1784	Federalist	1780	Jonathan Trumbull
21	Matthew Griswold	October 10, 1776 – May 13, 1784	Federalist	1781	Jonathan Trumbull
21	Matthew Griswold	October 10, 1776 – May 13, 1784	Federalist	1782	Jonathan Trumbull
21	Matthew Griswold	October 10, 1776 – May 13, 1784	Federalist	1783	Jonathan Trumbull
22	Samuel Huntington	May 13, 1784 – May 11, 1786	Federalist	1784	Matthew Griswold
22	Samuel Huntington	May 13, 1784 – May 11, 1786	Federalist	1785	Matthew Griswold
23	Oliver Wolcott	May 11, 1786 – January 5, 1796	Federalist	1786	Samuel Huntington (died January 5, 1796)
23	Oliver Wolcott	May 11, 1786 – January 5, 1796	Federalist	1787	Samuel Huntington (died January 5, 1796)
23	Oliver Wolcott	May 11, 1786 – January 5, 1796	Federalist	1788	Samuel Huntington (died January 5, 1796)
23	Oliver Wolcott	May 11, 1786 – January 5, 1796	Federalist	1789	Samuel Huntington (died January 5, 1796)
23	Oliver Wolcott	May 11, 1786 – January 5, 1796	Federalist	1790	Samuel Huntington (died January 5, 1796)
23	Oliver Wolcott	May 11, 1786 – January 5, 1796	Federalist	1791	Samuel Huntington (died January 5, 1796)
23	Oliver Wolcott	May 11, 1786 – January 5, 1796	Federalist	1792	Samuel Huntington (died January 5, 1796)
23	Oliver Wolcott	May 11, 1786 – January 5, 1796	Federalist	1793	Samuel Huntington (died January 5, 1796)
23	Oliver Wolcott	May 11, 1786 – January 5, 1796	Federalist	1794	Samuel Huntington (died January 5, 1796)
23	Oliver Wolcott	May 11, 1786 – January 5, 1796	Federalist	1795	Samuel Huntington (died January 5, 1796)
—	Office vacant from January 5 - May 12, 1796		Office vacated by succession to governor		Oliver Wolcott (died December 1, 1797)
24	Jonathan Trumbull Jr.	May 12, 1796 – December 1, 1797	Federalist	1796	Oliver Wolcott (died December 1, 1797)
24	Jonathan Trumbull Jr.	May 12, 1796 – December 1, 1797	Federalist	1797	Oliver Wolcott (died December 1, 1797)
—	Office vacant from December 1, 1797 - May 10, 1798		Office vacated by succession to governor		Jonathan Trumbull Jr (died August 7, 1809)
25	John Treadwell	May 10, 1798 – August 7, 1809	Federalist	1798	Jonathan Trumbull Jr (died August 7, 1809)
25	John Treadwell	May 10, 1798 – August 7, 1809	Federalist	1799	Jonathan Trumbull Jr (died August 7, 1809)
25	John Treadwell	May 10, 1798 – August 7, 1809	Federalist	1800	Jonathan Trumbull Jr (died August 7, 1809)
25	John Treadwell	May 10, 1798 – August 7, 1809	Federalist	1801	Jonathan Trumbull Jr (died August 7, 1809)
25	John Treadwell	May 10, 1798 – August 7, 1809	Federalist	1802	Jonathan Trumbull Jr (died August 7, 1809)
25	John Treadwell	May 10, 1798 – August 7, 1809	Federalist	1803	Jonathan Trumbull Jr (died August 7, 1809)
25	John Treadwell	May 10, 1798 – August 7, 1809	Federalist	1804	Jonathan Trumbull Jr (died August 7, 1809)
25	John Treadwell	May 10, 1798 – August 7, 1809	Federalist	1805	Jonathan Trumbull Jr (died August 7, 1809)
25	John Treadwell	May 10, 1798 – August 7, 1809	Federalist	1806	Jonathan Trumbull Jr (died August 7, 1809)
25	John Treadwell	May 10, 1798 – August 7, 1809	Federalist	1807	Jonathan Trumbull Jr (died August 7, 1809)
25	John Treadwell	May 10, 1798 – August 7, 1809	Federalist	1808	Jonathan Trumbull Jr (died August 7, 1809)
25	John Treadwell	May 10, 1798 – August 7, 1809	Federalist	1809	Jonathan Trumbull Jr (died August 7, 1809)
—	Office vacant from August 7 - October 20, 1809		Office vacated by succession to governor		John Treadwell
26	Roger Griswold	October 20, 1809 – May 9, 1811	Federalist	1810	John Treadwell
27	John Cotton Smith	May 9, 1811 – October 25, 1812	Federalist	1811	Roger Griswold (died October 25, 1812)
27	John Cotton Smith	May 9, 1811 – October 25, 1812	Federalist	1812	Roger Griswold (died October 25, 1812)
—	Office vacant from October 25, 1812 - May 13, 1813		Office vacated by succession to governor		John Cotton Smith (Note: Represented the Federalist Party)
28	Chauncey Goodrich	May 13, 1813 – August 18, 1815	Federalist	1813	John Cotton Smith
28	Chauncey Goodrich	May 13, 1813 – August 18, 1815	Federalist	1814	John Cotton Smith
28	Chauncey Goodrich	May 13, 1813 – August 18, 1815	Federalist	1815	John Cotton Smith
—	Office vacant from August 18, 1815 - May 9, 1816		Office vacated by death		John Cotton Smith
29	Jonathan Ingersoll	May 9, 1816 – January 12, 1823	Democratic- Republican	1816	John Cotton Smith
29	Jonathan Ingersoll	May 9, 1816 – January 12, 1823	Toleration Party	1817	Oliver Wolcott Jr (Note: Represented the Toleration Party through the 1818 election, and the Democratic-Republican Party after that.)
29	Jonathan Ingersoll	May 9, 1816 – January 12, 1823	Toleration Party	1818	Oliver Wolcott Jr
29	Jonathan Ingersoll	May 9, 1816 – January 12, 1823	Toleration Party	1819	Oliver Wolcott Jr
29	Jonathan Ingersoll	May 9, 1816 – January 12, 1823	Toleration Party	1820	Oliver Wolcott Jr
29	Jonathan Ingersoll	May 9, 1816 – January 12, 1823	Toleration Party	1821	Oliver Wolcott Jr
29	Jonathan Ingersoll	May 9, 1816 – January 12, 1823	Toleration Party	1822	Oliver Wolcott Jr
—	Office vacant from January 12 - May 7, 1823		Office vacated by death		Oliver Wolcott Jr
30	David Plant	May 7, 1823 – May 2, 1827	National; Republican	1823	Oliver Wolcott Jr
30	David Plant	May 7, 1823 – May 2, 1827	National; Republican	1824	Oliver Wolcott Jr
30	David Plant	May 7, 1823 – May 2, 1827	National; Republican	1825	Oliver Wolcott Jr
30	David Plant	May 7, 1823 – May 2, 1827	National; Republican	1826	Oliver Wolcott Jr
31	John Samuel Peters	May 2, 1827 – March 2, 1831	National; Republican	1827	Gideon Tomlinson (Note: Represented the Democratic-Republican Party in his first year, and the National Republican Party after that.)
31	John Samuel Peters	May 2, 1827 – March 2, 1831	National; Republican	1828	Gideon Tomlinson
31	John Samuel Peters	May 2, 1827 – March 2, 1831	National; Republican	1829	Gideon Tomlinson
31	John Samuel Peters	May 2, 1827 – March 2, 1831	National; Republican	1830 (Note: Tomlinson resigned and Peters acted as governor, rendering the office vacant for the remainder of the term.)	Gideon Tomlinson
—	Office vacant from March 2 - May 4, 1831		—	1830	John Samuel Peters
32	Thaddeus Betts	March 2, 1831 – May 1, 1833	National; Republican	1831	John Samuel Peters
32	Thaddeus Betts	March 2, 1831 – May 1, 1833	National; Republican	1832	John Samuel Peters
33	Ebenezer Stoddard	May 1, 1833 – May 7, 1834	Democratic	1833	Henry W. Edwards
34	Thaddeus Betts	May 7, 1834 – May 6, 1835	Whig	1834	Samuel A. Foot
35	Ebenezer Stoddard	May 6, 1835 – May 2, 1838	Democratic	1835	Henry W. Edwards
35	Ebenezer Stoddard	May 6, 1835 – May 2, 1838	Democratic	1836	Henry W. Edwards
35	Ebenezer Stoddard	May 6, 1835 – May 2, 1838	Democratic	1837	Henry W. Edwards
36	Charles Hawley	May 2, 1838 – May 4, 1842	Whig	1838	William W. Ellsworth
36	Charles Hawley	May 2, 1838 – May 4, 1842	Whig	1839	William W. Ellsworth
36	Charles Hawley	May 2, 1838 – May 4, 1842	Whig	1840	William W. Ellsworth
36	Charles Hawley	May 2, 1838 – May 4, 1842	Whig	1841	William W. Ellsworth
37	William S. Holabird	May 4, 1842 – May 1, 1844	Democratic	1842	Chauncey Fitch Cleveland
37	William S. Holabird	May 4, 1842 – May 1, 1844	Democratic	1843	Chauncey Fitch Cleveland
38	Reuben Booth	May 1, 1844 – May 6, 1846	Whig	1844	Roger Sherman Baldwin
38	Reuben Booth	May 1, 1844 – May 6, 1846	Whig	1845	Roger Sherman Baldwin
39	Noyes Billings	May 6, 1846 – May 5, 1847	Democratic	1846	Isaac Toucey
40	Charles J. McCurdy	May 5, 1847 – May 2, 1849	Whig	1847	Clark Bissell
40	Charles J. McCurdy	May 5, 1847 – May 2, 1849	Whig	1848	Clark Bissell
41	Thomas Backus	May 2, 1849 – May 4, 1850	Whig	1849	Joseph Trumbull
42	Charles H. Pond	May 5, 1850 – May 7, 1851	Democratic	1850	Thomas H. Seymour (Note: Represented the Democratic Party.)
43	Green Kendrick	May 7, 1851 – May 7, 1852	Whig	1851	Thomas H. Seymour
44	Charles H. Pond	May 7, 1852 – October 13, 1853	Democratic	1852	Thomas H. Seymour
44	Charles H. Pond	May 7, 1852 – October 13, 1853	Democratic	1853 (Note: Seymour resigned and Pond acted as governor, rendering the office vacant for the remainder of the term.)	Thomas H. Seymour
—	Office vacant from October 13, 1853 - May 3, 1854		—	1853	Charles H. Pond
45	Alexander H. Holley	May 3, 1854 – May 2, 1855	Whig	1854	Henry Dutton
46	William Field	May 2, 1855 – May 7, 1856	Free Soil	1855	William T. Minor
47	Albert Day	May 7, 1856 – May 6, 1857	American	1856	William T. Minor
48	Alfred A. Burnham	May 6, 1857 – May 5, 1858	Republican	1857	Alexander H. Holley
49	Julius Catlin	May 5, 1858 – May 1, 1861	Republican	1858	William Alfred Buckingham
49	Julius Catlin	May 5, 1858 – May 1, 1861	Republican	1859	William Alfred Buckingham
49	Julius Catlin	May 5, 1858 – May 1, 1861	Republican	1860	William Alfred Buckingham
50	Benjamin Douglas	May 1, 1861 – May 7, 1862	Republican	1861	William Alfred Buckingham
51	Roger Averill	May 7, 1862 – May 2, 1866	National Union	1862	William Alfred Buckingham
51	Roger Averill	May 7, 1862 – May 2, 1866	National Union	1863	William Alfred Buckingham
51	Roger Averill	May 7, 1862 – May 2, 1866	National Union	1864	William Alfred Buckingham
51	Roger Averill	May 7, 1862 – May 2, 1866	National Union	1865	William Alfred Buckingham
52	Oliver Winchester	May 2, 1866 – May 1, 1867	Republican	1866	Joseph Roswell Hawley
53	Ephraim H. Hyde	May 1, 1867 – May 5, 1869	Democratic	1867	James E. English
53	Ephraim H. Hyde	May 1, 1867 – May 5, 1869	Democratic	1868	James E. English
54	Francis Wayland III	May 5, 1869 – May 4, 1870	Republican	1869	Marshall Jewell
55	Julius Hotchkiss	May 4, 1870 – May 16, 1871	Democratic	1870	James E. English
56	Morris Tyler	May 16, 1871 – May 7, 1873	Republican	1871	Marshall Jewell
56	Morris Tyler	May 16, 1871 – May 7, 1873	Republican	1872	Marshall Jewell
57	George G. Sill	May 7, 1873 – January 3, 1877	Democratic	1873	Charles Roberts Ingersoll
57	George G. Sill	May 7, 1873 – January 3, 1877	Democratic	1874	Charles Roberts Ingersoll
57	George G. Sill	May 7, 1873 – January 3, 1877	Democratic	1875	Charles Roberts Ingersoll
57	George G. Sill	May 7, 1873 – January 3, 1877	Democratic	Apr. 1876 (Note: This term was only from May 1876 to January 1877, due to a constitutional amendment moving the election schedule.)	Charles Roberts Ingersoll
58	Francis Loomis	January 3, 1877 – January 9, 1879	Democratic	Nov. 1876 (Note: First term under a constitutional amendment which lengthened terms to two years.)	Richard D. Hubbard
59	David Gallup	January 9, 1879 – January 5, 1881	Republican	1878	Charles B. Andrews
60	William H. Bulkeley	January 5, 1881 – January 3, 1883	Republican	1880	Hobart B. Bigelow
61	George G. Sumner	January 3, 1883 – January 8, 1885	Democratic	1882	Thomas M. Waller
62	Lorrin A. Cooke	January 8, 1885 – January 7, 1887	Republican	1884	Henry Baldwin Harrison
63	James L. Howard	January 7, 1887 – January 10, 1889	Republican	1886	Phineas C. Lounsbury
64	Samuel E. Merwin	January 10, 1889 – January 4, 1893	Republican	1888	Morgan Bulkeley (Note: Morgan Bulkeley did not run for re-election in 1890, but due to such a close contest and controversies, the results were not certified, and the legislature spent two years debating the issue; Bulkeley essentially served as governor by default.)
64	Samuel E. Merwin	January 10, 1889 – January 4, 1893	Republican	1890	Morgan Bulkeley
65	Ernest Cady	January 4, 1893 – January 9, 1895	Democratic	1892	Luzon B. Morris
66	Lorrin A. Cooke	January 9, 1895 – January 6, 1897	Republican	1894	Owen Vincent Coffin
67	James D. Dewell	January 6, 1897 – January 4, 1899	Republican	1896	Lorrin A. Cooke
68	Lyman A. Mills	January 4, 1899 – January 9, 1901	Republican	1898	George E. Lounsbury
69	Edwin O. Keeler	January 9, 1901 – January 7, 1903	Republican	1900	George P. McLean
70	Henry Roberts	January 7, 1903 – January 4, 1905	Republican	1902	Abiram Chamberlain
71	Rollin S. Woodruff	January 4, 1905 – January 9, 1907	Republican	1904	Henry Roberts
72	Everett J. Lake	January 9, 1907 – January 9, 1909	Republican	1906	Rollin S. Woodruff
73	Frank B. Weeks	January 6, 1909 – April 21, 1909	Republican	1908 (Note: Lilley died and Weeks acted as governor, rendering the office vacant for the remainder of the term.)	George L. Lilley
—	Office vacant from April 21, 1909 - January 4, 1911		—	1908	Frank B. Weeks
74	Dennis A. Blakeslee	January 4, 1911 – January 8, 1913	Republican	1910	Simeon E. Baldwin
75	Lyman T. Tingier	January 8, 1913 – January 6, 1915	Democratic	1912	Simeon E. Baldwin
76	Clifford B. Wilson	January 6, 1915 – January 5, 1921	Republican	1914	Marcus H. Holcomb
76	Clifford B. Wilson	January 6, 1915 – January 5, 1921	Republican	1916	Marcus H. Holcomb
76	Clifford B. Wilson	January 6, 1915 – January 5, 1921	Republican	1918	Marcus H. Holcomb
77	Charles A. Templeton	January 5, 1921 – January 3, 1923	Republican	1920	Everett J. Lake
78	Hiram Bingham III	January 3, 1923 – January 7, 1925	Republican	1922	Charles A. Templeton
79	John H. Trumbull	January 7, 1925 – January 8, 1925	Republican	1924 (Note: Bingham resigned and Trumbull acted as governor for the remainder of the term; as president pro tempore of the senate, Brainard succeeded Trumbull.)	Hiram Bingham III
80	J. Edwin Brainard	January 8, 1925 – January 9, 1929	Republican	1924	John H. Trumbull
80	J. Edwin Brainard	January 8, 1925 – January 9, 1929	Republican	1926	John H. Trumbull
81	Ernest E. Rogers	January 9, 1929 – January 7, 1931	Republican	1928	John H. Trumbull
82	Samuel R. Spencer	January 7, 1931 – January 4, 1933	Republican	1930	Wilbur Lucius Cross
83	Roy C. Wilcox	January 4, 1933 – January 9, 1935	Republican	1932	Wilbur Lucius Cross
84	T. Frank Hayes	January 9, 1935 – January 4, 1939	Democratic	1934	Wilbur Lucius Cross
84	T. Frank Hayes	January 9, 1935 – January 4, 1939	Democratic	1936	Wilbur Lucius Cross
85	James L. McConaughy	January 4, 1939 – January 8, 1941	Republican	1938	Raymond E. Baldwin
86	Odell Shepard	January 8, 1941 – January 6, 1943	Democratic	1940	Robert A. Hurley
87	William L. Hadden	January 6, 1943 – January 3, 1945	Republican	1942	Raymond E. Baldwin (Note: Represented the Republican Party.)
88	Charles Wilbert Snow	January 3, 1945 – December 27, 1946	Democratic	1944 (Note: Baldwin resigned and Snow acted as governor; the office remained vacant for the remainder of the term.)	Raymond E. Baldwin
—	Office vacant from December 27, 1946 - January 8, 1947		—	1944	Charles Wilbert Snow
89	James C. Shannon	January 8, 1947 – March 7, 1948	Republican	1946 (Note: McConaughy died and Shannon acted as governor; as president pro tempore of the senate, Parsons succeeded Shannon.)	James L. McConaughy
90	Robert E. Parsons	March 7, 1948 – January 5, 1949	Republican	1946	James C. Shannon
91	William T. Carroll	January 5, 1949 – January 3, 1951	Democratic	1948	Chester Bowles
92	Edward N. Allen	January 3, 1951 – January 5, 1955	Republican	1950 (Note: First term under a constitution amendment which lengthened terms to four years.)	John Davis Lodge
93	Charles W. Jewett	January 5, 1955 – January 7, 1959	Republican	1954	Abraham Ribicoff
94	John N. Dempsey	January 7, 1959 – January 21, 1961	Democratic	1958 (Note: Ribicoff resigned and Dempsey acted as governor for the remainder of his term; as president pro tempore of the senate, Armentano succeeded Dempsey.)	Abraham Ribicoff
95	Anthony J. Armentano	January 21, 1961 – January 9, 1963	Democratic	1958	John N. Dempsey
96	Samuel J. Tedesco	January 9, 1963 – January 15, 1966	Democratic	1962 (Note: Tedesco resigned to take a seat on the Connecticut Superior Court; as president pro tempore of the senate, Doocy succeeded him.)	John N. Dempsey
97	Fred J. Doocy	January 15, 1966 – January 4, 1967	Democratic	1962	John N. Dempsey
98	Attilio R. Frassinelli	January 4, 1967 – January 6, 1971	Democratic	1966	John N. Dempsey
99	T. Clark Hull	January 6, 1971 – June 1, 1973	Republican	1970 (Note: Hull resigned to take a seat on the Connecticut Superior Court; as president pro tempore of the senate, Cashman succeeded him.)	Thomas Meskill
100	Peter L. Cashman	June 1, 1973 – January 8, 1975	Republican	1970	Thomas Meskill
101	Robert K. Killian	January 8, 1975 – January 3, 1979	Democratic	1974	Ella Grasso
102	William A. O'Neill	January 3, 1979 – December 31, 1980	Democratic	1978 (Note: Grasso resigned and O'Neill succeeded her; as president pro tempore of the senate, Fauliso succeeded O'Neill.)	Ella Grasso
103	Joseph J. Fauliso	December 31, 1980 – January 9, 1991	Democratic	1978	William A. O'Neill
103	Joseph J. Fauliso	December 31, 1980 – January 9, 1991	Democratic	1982	William A. O'Neill
103	Joseph J. Fauliso	December 31, 1980 – January 9, 1991	Democratic	1986	William A. O'Neill
104	Eunice Groark	January 9, 1991 – January 4, 1995	A Connecticut Party	1990	Lowell Weicker
105	Jodi Rell	January 4, 1995 – July 1, 2004	Republican	1994	John G. Rowland
105	Jodi Rell	January 4, 1995 – July 1, 2004	Republican	1998	John G. Rowland
105	Jodi Rell	January 4, 1995 – July 1, 2004	Republican	2002 (Note: Rowland resigned and Rell succeeded him; as president pro tempore of the senate, Sullivan succeeded Rell.)	John G. Rowland
106	Kevin Sullivan	July 1, 2004 – January 3, 2007	Democratic	2002	Jodi Rell
107	Michael Fedele	January 3, 2007 – January 5, 2011	Republican	2006	Jodi Rell
108	Nancy Wyman	January 5, 2011 – January 9, 2019	Democratic	2010	Dannel Malloy
108	Nancy Wyman	January 5, 2011 – January 9, 2019	Democratic	2014	Dannel Malloy
109	Susan Bysiewicz	January 9, 2019 – Incumbent	Democratic	2018	Ned Lamont
109	Susan Bysiewicz	January 9, 2019 – Incumbent	Democratic	2022	Ned Lamont
