= 1792 Connecticut lieutenant gubernatorial election =

- April 9, 1792
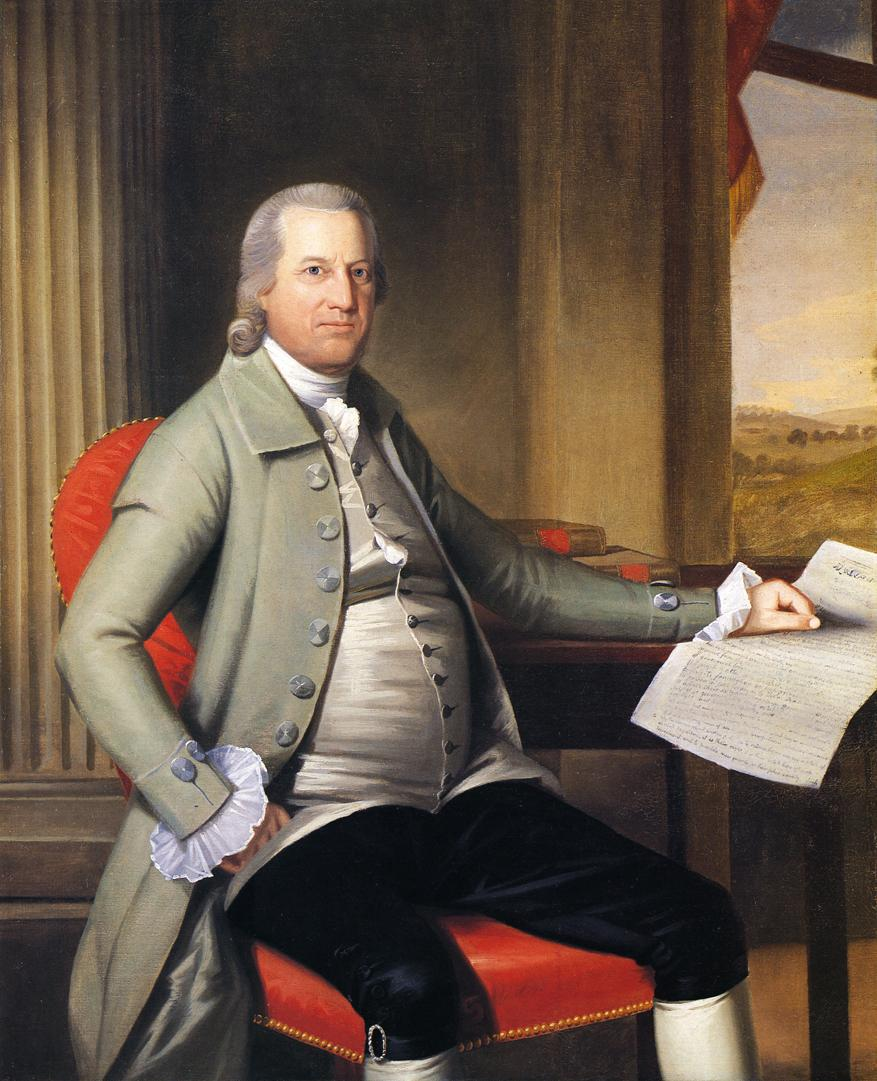

Nominee	Oliver Wolcott	Oliver Ellsworth
Party	Federalist	Federalist
Popular vote	2,370	1,894
Percentage	48.10%	38.50%
Lieutenant Governor before election
Oliver Wolcott
Federalist
Elected Lieutenant Governor
Oliver Wolcott
Federalist

The 1792 Connecticut lieutenant gubernatorial election was held on April 9, 1792, in order to elect the lieutenant governor of Connecticut. Incumbent Federalist lieutenant governor Oliver Wolcott won a plurality of the vote in his re-election bid against fellow Federalist candidate and incumbent United States Senator from Connecticut Oliver Ellsworth and other candidates. However, as no candidate received a majority of the total votes cast as was required by Connecticut law, the election was forwarded to the Connecticut legislature, who chose Wolcott as lieutenant governor.

== General election ==
On election day, April 9, 1792, incumbent Federalist lieutenant governor Oliver Wolcott won the election after having been chosen by the Connecticut legislature. Wolcott was sworn in for his seventh term on May 10, 1792.

=== Results ===
Connecticut lieutenant gubernatorial election, 1792
Party	Candidate	Votes	%
Federalist	Oliver Wolcott (incumbent)	2,370	48.10
Federalist	Oliver Ellsworth	1,894	38.50
	Scattering	660	13.40
Total votes		4,924	100.00
Federalist hold			
