= William W. Boardman =

American politician (1794–1871)

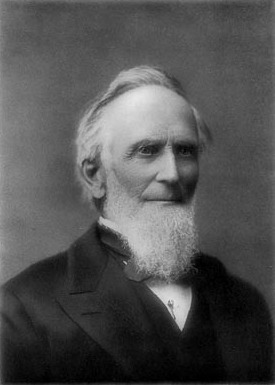

Member of the U.S. House of Representatives from Connecticut's 2nd district
- In office December 7, 1840 – March 3, 1843
- Preceded by: William L. Storrs
- Succeeded by: John Stewart

Member of the Connecticut Senate
- In office 1836-1839; 1845; 1849-1851

Personal details
- Born: October 10, 1794 New Milford, Connecticut
- Died: August 27, 1871 (aged 76) New Haven, Connecticut
- Party: Whig, Democratic
- Spouse: Lucy Hall Boardman
- Education: Yale College; Cambridge; Litchfield Law School

William Whiting Boardman (October 10, 1794 – August 27, 1871) was a politician and United States Representative from Connecticut.

== Biography ==
Born in New Milford, Connecticut, William Whiting Boardman was the son of Senator Elijah Boardman and Mary Ann Whiting Boardman; and nephew of David Sherman Boardman. He was an early graduate of Bacon Academy in Colchester, Connecticut. He graduated from Yale College in 1812 and then studied law first in Cambridge for some time and then at the Litchfield Law School in 1816 and 1817, before being admitted to the bar in 1818. He opened a law office in New Haven in 1820. His first major position was as a Judge of Probate in New Haven, Connecticut from 1825 to 1829.

== Career ==
Boardman served as clerk of the Connecticut State Senate in 1820. His first major position was as a Judge of Probate in New Haven, Connecticut from 1825 to 1829. He was a member of the Connecticut State Senate for the fourth district from 1830 to 1832.

A member of the Connecticut House of Representatives from 1836 to 1839, in 1845, and from 1849 to 1851, he served as Speaker of the Connecticut State House of Representatives in 1836, 1839, and 1845.

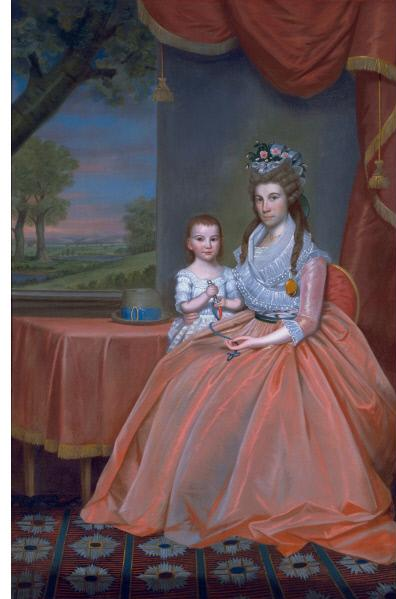
A portrait by the artist, Ralph Earl circa 1796 entitled Mrs. Elijah Boardman and her Son, William Whiting Boardman

Boardman was a delegate to Whig National Convention from Connecticut in 1839 and was a member of the Balloting Committee, and served as speaker. He was chosen as a Whig to the Twenty-sixth Congress to fill the vacancy caused by the resignation of William L. Storrs; reelected to the Twenty-seventh Congress and served from December 7, 1840, to March 3, 1843. He was chairman of the Committee on Public Buildings and Grounds during the Twenty-seventh Congress.

As a member of the Governor's Foot Guard, Boardman rose to the rank of major. In 1864, he was member of the Common Council of New Haven City. He was a trustee of Trinity College from 1832 until 1871 and acted as the president of both the Gas Light Company of New Haven and the New Haven Water Company. He was member of the Episcopal Church and held offices among which were: Warden and vestryman of Trinity Church on the Green, New Haven; trustee of the General, Theological Seminary of the Protestant Episcopal Church; Trustee of the Cheshire Academy; President of the Board of Bishops' Fund. He was a founder and Vice President of the General Hospital Society of New Haven (now called Yale New Haven Hospital).

On July 28, 1857, he married Lucy Hall of Poland, Ohio. He and his wife had no children.

In 1897, Boardman's sister-in-law, Mrs. Mary P. Wade, gave Trinity Church on the Green (New Haven, Connecticut), an opalescent glass a window by the L.C. Tiffany Company in memory of William W. Boardman and Lucy H. Boardman. Trinity Church on the Green, New Haven, Connecticut.

== Death ==
William Whiting Boardman died in New Haven, Connecticut of acute bronchitis, on August 27, 1871 (age 76 years) and is interred at Grove Street Cemetery.

== Bibliography ==
- (1871). "Obituary: William Whiting Boardman." New York Times. August 29, 1871.
- (1880). Obituary Record of Graduates. New Haven: Yale University.
- "William Whiting Boardman." Biographical Directory of the United States Congress. Retrieved October 13, 2007.

U.S. House of Representatives
Preceded by William L. Storrs	Member of the U.S. House of Representatives from Connecticut's 2nd congressional district 1840–1843	Succeeded by John Stewart
