= 1814 Connecticut lieutenant gubernatorial election =

- April 11, 1814
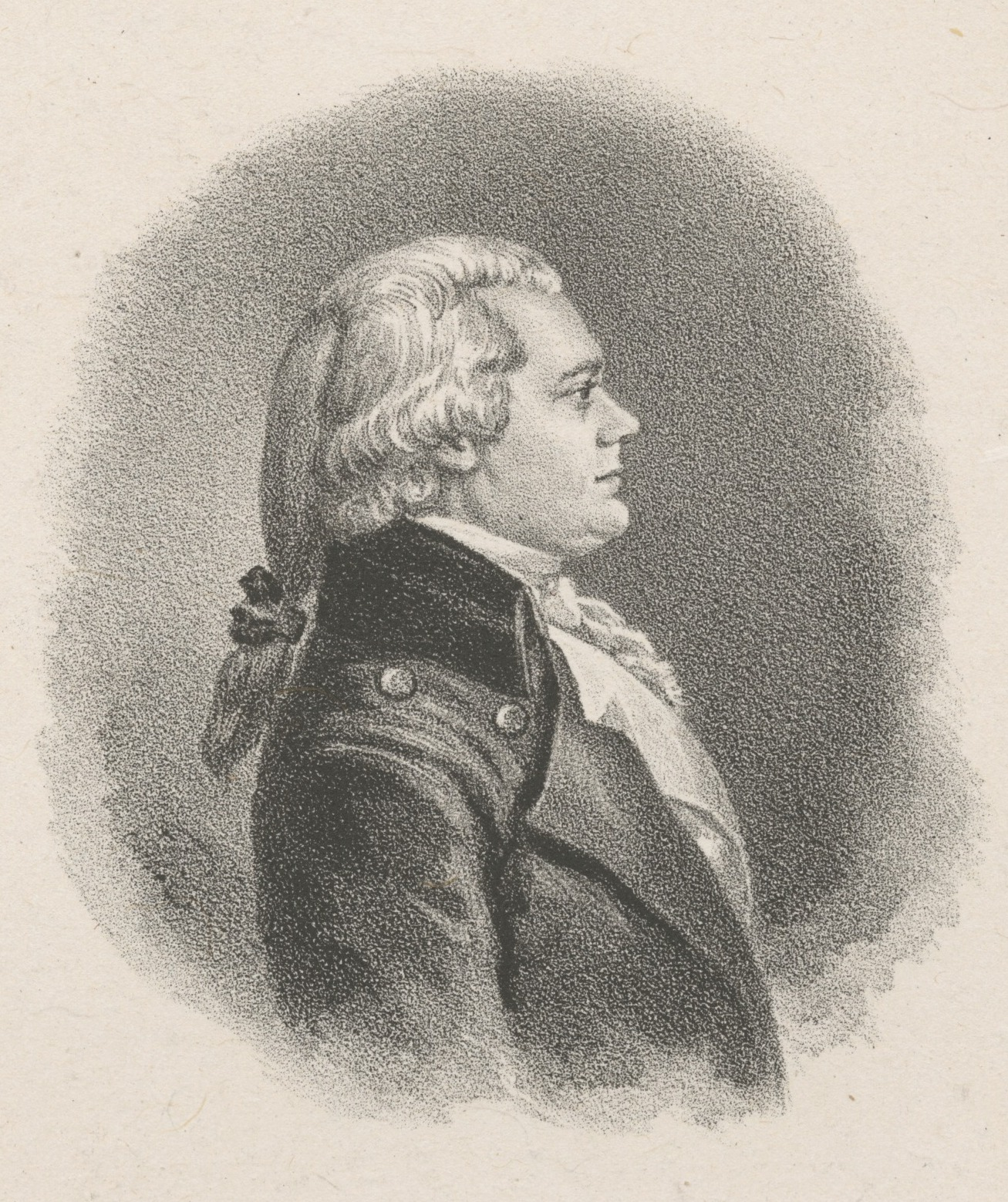

Nominee	Chauncey Goodrich	Isaac Spencer
Party	Federalist	Democratic-Republican
Popular vote	7,784	2,794
Percentage	69.40%	24.90%
Lieutenant Governor before election
Chauncey Goodrich
Federalist
Elected Lieutenant Governor
Chauncey Goodrich
Federalist

The 1814 Connecticut lieutenant gubernatorial election was held on April 11, 1814, in order to elect the lieutenant governor of Connecticut. Incumbent Federalist lieutenant governor Chauncey Goodrich defeated Democratic-Republican candidate Isaac Spencer in a rematch of the previous election.

== General election ==
On election day, April 11, 1814, incumbent Federalist lieutenant governor Chauncey Goodrich won re-election by a margin of 4,990 votes against his opponent Democratic-Republican candidate Isaac Spencer, thereby retaining Federalist control over the office of lieutenant governor. Goodrich was sworn in for his second term on May 12, 1814.

=== Results ===
Connecticut lieutenant gubernatorial election, 1814
Party	Candidate	Votes	%
Federalist	Chauncey Goodrich (incumbent)	7,784	69.40
Democratic-Republican	Isaac Spencer	2,794	24.90
	Scattering	642	5.70
Total votes		11,220	100.00
Federalist hold			
