= 1796 Connecticut lieutenant gubernatorial election =

- April 11, 1796
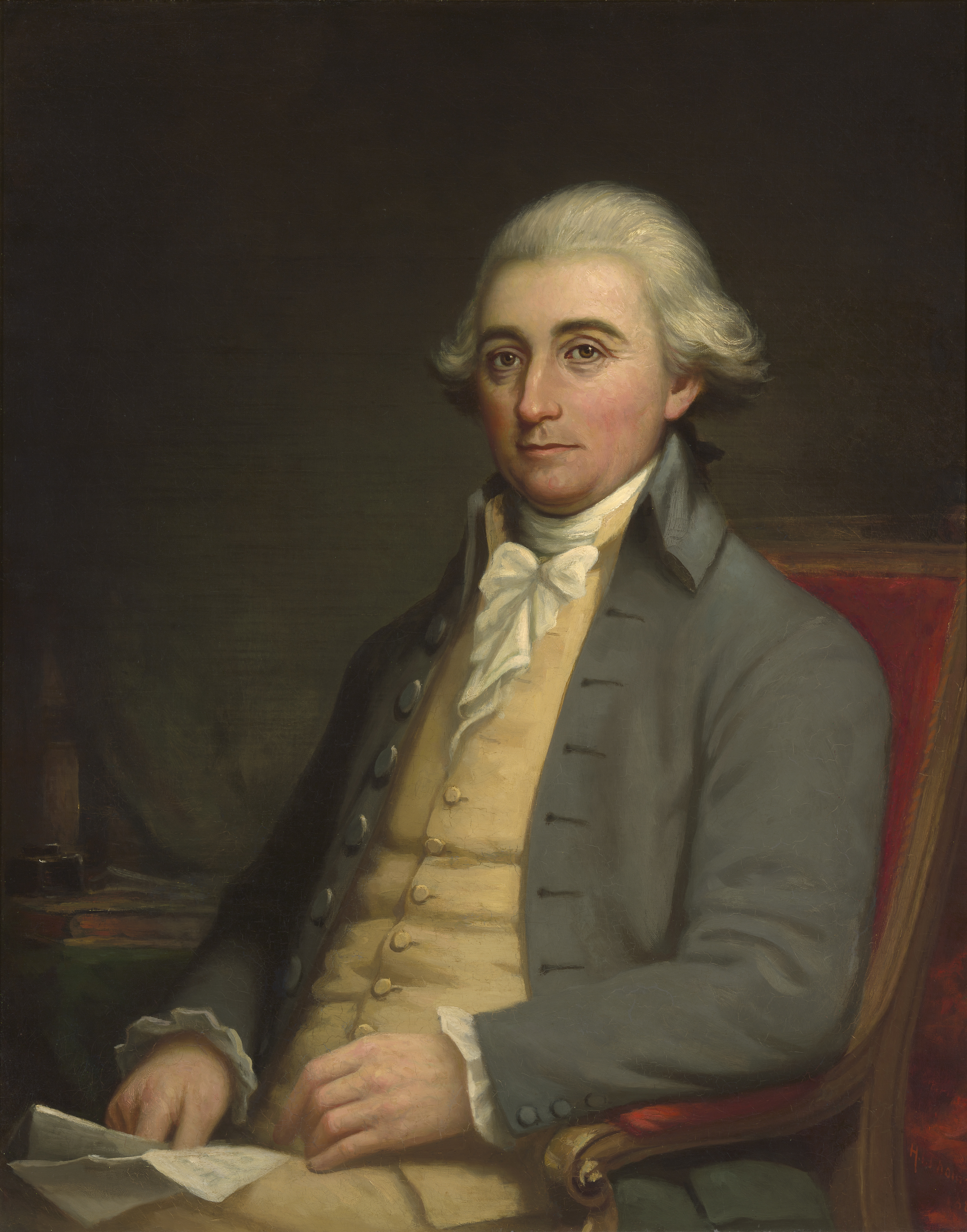

Nominee	Jonathan Trumbull Jr.	Jonathan Ingersoll
Party	Federalist	Democratic-Republican
Popular vote	1,882	1,057
Percentage	34.40%	19.30%
Lieutenant Governor before election
Vacant
Elected Lieutenant Governor
Jonathan Trumbull Jr.
Federalist

The 1796 Connecticut lieutenant gubernatorial election was held on April 11, 1796, in order to elect the lieutenant governor of Connecticut. Federalist candidate and former Speaker of the United States House of Representatives Jonathan Trumbull Jr. won a plurality of the vote against Democratic-Republican candidate Jonathan Ingersoll and other candidates. However, as no candidate received a majority of the total votes cast as was required by Connecticut law, the election was forwarded to the Connecticut legislature, who chose Trumbull as lieutenant governor.

== General election ==
On election day, April 11, 1796, Federalist candidate Jonathan Trumbull Jr. won the election after having been chosen by the Connecticut legislature, thereby retaining Federalist control over the office of lieutenant governor. Trumbull was sworn in as the 24th lieutenant governor of Connecticut on May 12, 1796.

=== Results ===
Connecticut lieutenant gubernatorial election, 1796
Party	Candidate	Votes	%
Federalist	Jonathan Ingersoll	1,882	34.40
Democratic-Republican	Jonathan Ingersoll	1,057	19.30
	Scattering	2,536	46.30
Total votes		5,475	100.00
Federalist hold			
