= Samuel L. Warner =

American politician (1828–1893)

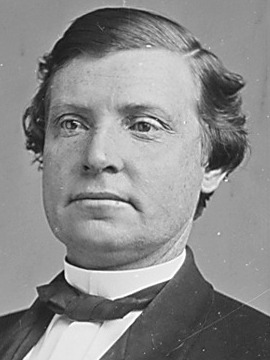

Member of the U.S. House of Representatives from Connecticut's 2nd district
- In office March 4, 1865 – March 3, 1867
- Preceded by: James E. English
- Succeeded by: Julius Hotchkiss

Personal details
- Born: June 14, 1828 Wethersfield, Connecticut, U.S.
- Died: February 6, 1893 (aged 64) Middletown, Connecticut, U.S.
- Party: Republican
- Relatives: Levi Warner (brother)

Samuel Larkin Warner (June 14, 1828 – February 6, 1893) was a U.S. Representative from Connecticut, brother of Levi Warner.

Born in Wethersfield, Connecticut, Warner attended Wilbraham Academy in Wilbraham, Massachusetts, and the law department of Yale College. He graduated from the law department of Harvard University in 1854. He was admitted to the bar in Boston, Massachusetts, in 1854. He commenced the practice of law in Portland, Connecticut, in 1855. He served as member of the State house of representatives in 1858. He moved to Middletown in 1860. He served there as mayor 1862–1866. He served as delegate to the Republican National Convention in 1864, 1888, and 1892.

Warner was elected as a Republican to the Thirty-ninth Congress (March 4, 1865 – March 3, 1867). He was not a candidate for renomination. He resumed the practice of law. He died in Middletown, Connecticut on February 6, 1893.

U.S. House of Representatives
Preceded by James E. English	Member of the U.S. House of Representatives from Connecticut's 2nd congressional district 1865–1867	Succeeded by Julius Hotchkiss
