= 1823 Connecticut lieutenant gubernatorial election =

- April 7, 1823

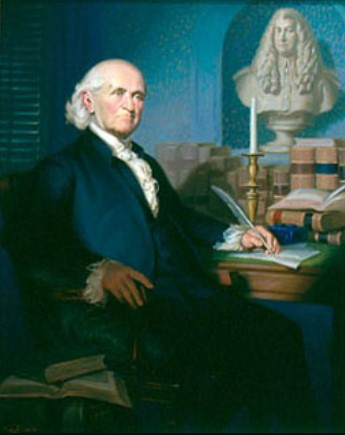
| Nominee | David Plant | Elias Perkins | Zephaniah Swift |
| Party | National Republican | National Republican | Federalist |
| Popular vote | 5,443 | 4,147 | 1,688 |
| Percentage | 45.20% | 34.50% | 14.00% |
- Plant: 30–40% 40–50% 50–60% 60–70% 70–80% 80–90% 90–100% Perkins: 40–50% 50–60% 60–70% 70–80% 80–90% 90–100% Swift: 30–40% 40–50% 50–60% 60–70% Pitkin: 50–60% 60–70% Tie: 40–50% 50% No Data/Vote
Lieutenant Governor before election
Vacant
Elected Lieutenant Governor
David Plant
National Republican

The 1823 Connecticut lieutenant gubernatorial election was held on April 7, 1823, in order to elect the lieutenant governor of Connecticut. National Republican candidate and former Speaker of the Connecticut House of Representatives David Plant received a plurality of the votes against National Republican candidate and former member of the U.S. House of Representatives from Connecticut's at-large district Elias Perkins and Federalist candidate and former Chief justice of the Connecticut Supreme Court Zephaniah Swift. However, since no candidate received a majority in the popular vote, David Plant was elected by the Connecticut General Assembly per the Connecticut Charter of 1662.

== General election ==
On election day, April 7, 1823, National Republican candidate David Plant won a plurality of the vote by a margin of 1,296 votes against his foremost opponent fellow National Republican candidate Elias Perkins. However, as no candidate received a majority of the vote, the election was forwarded to the Connecticut General Assembly.

=== Results ===
Connecticut lieutenant gubernatorial election, 1823
| Party | Candidate | Votes | % |
|---|---|---|---|
| National Republican | David Plant | 5,443 | 45.20 |
| National Republican | Elias Perkins | 4,147 | 34.50 |
| Federalist | Zephaniah Swift | 1,688 | 14.00 |
| | Scattering | 754 | 6.30 |
| Total votes | | 12,032 | 100.00 |
| National Republican gain from Toleration | | | |

== Legislative election ==
As no candidate received a majority of the vote, the Connecticut General Assembly was required to decide the election. National Republican candidate David Plant was ultimately elected by the Connecticut General Assembly, thereby gaining National Republican control over the office of lieutenant governor. Plant was sworn in for his first term on May 7, 1823.

=== Results ===
Connecticut House of Representatives election
| Party | Candidate | Votes | % |
|---|---|---|---|
| National Republican | David Plant | 137 | 66.83% |
| National Republican | Elias Perkins | 41 | 20.00% |
| Federalist | Zephaniah Swift | 19 | 9.27% |
| Federalist | Timothy Pitkin | 5 | 2.44% |
| | Scattering | 3 | 1.46% |
| Total votes | | 205 | 100.00% |
| National Republican gain from Toleration | | | |
