= Morris Franklin Tyler =

American telephone industry pioneer and law professor

Morris Franklin Tyler (August 12, 1848 – December 4, 1907) was an American telephone industry pioneer, lawyer, and professor of law.

== Early life ==
Morris Franklin Tyler was the son of Morris Tyler (1806-1876) and Mary Frisbie (Butler) Tyler. His father, a wholesale boot and shoe merchant, served as mayor of New Haven and Lieutenant Governor of Connecticut. His father also was the second president of the New Haven & Derby Railroad from 1869 to 1874.

== Education and career ==
Morris Franklin Tyler, the son, graduated from Hillhouse High School in New Haven, and obtained A.B., A.M., and LL.B. degrees at Yale University. He was admitted to the bar in 1873, and opened a law office in New Haven. He served as executive secretary to Connecticut Governor Hobart B. Bigelow in 1881-82.

In 1878, he co-founded the New Haven District Telephone Company, which opened the world's first commercial telephone exchange and published the first classified telephone directory. As the firm expanded, it was reorganized as the Connecticut Telephone Company, and in 1882, as the Southern New England Telephone Company. He was elected president in 1883, and led the company through more than two decades of growth.

During the 1890s, while continuing to lead Southern New England Telephone, he also served Yale Law School as a professor of law, and from 1899-1904 was university treasurer. He resigned in 1904 to devote his full attention to the telephone company.

== Personal life ==
In 1873, he married Della Talman, granddaughter of artist John James Audubon. They had five children.

He died at home in New Haven on December 4, 1907.

== Legacy ==
The Morris Tyler Moot Court of Appeals, at Yale Law School, is named for him.
