= 1787 Connecticut lieutenant gubernatorial election =

- April 2, 1787
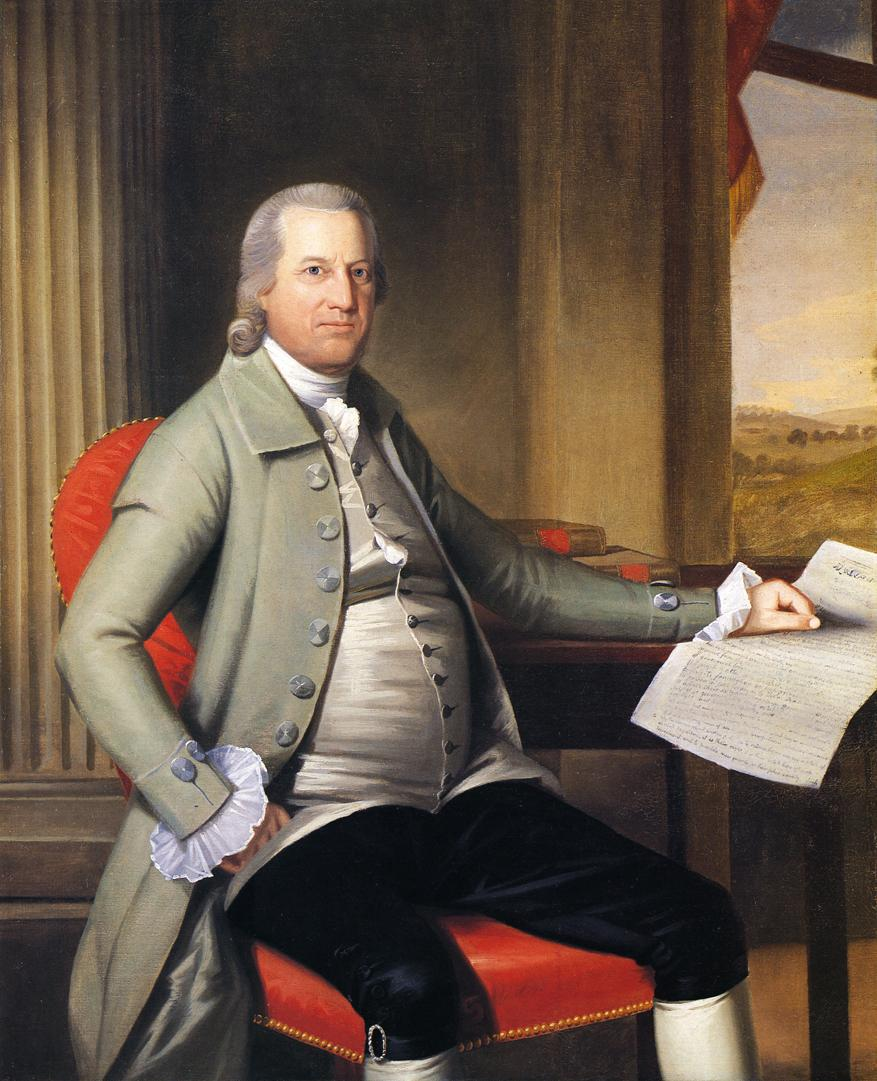
Nominee	Oliver Wolcott
Party	Federalist
Popular vote	2,213
Percentage	38.47%
Lieutenant Governor before election
Oliver Wolcott
Federalist
Elected Lieutenant Governor
Oliver Wolcott
Federalist

The 1787 Connecticut lieutenant gubernatorial election was held on April 2, 1787, in order to elect the lieutenant governor of Connecticut. Incumbent Federalist lieutenant governor Oliver Wolcott won a plurality of the vote in his re-election bid against other candidates. However, as no candidate received a majority of the total votes cast as was required by Connecticut law, the election was forwarded to the Connecticut legislature, who chose Wolcott as lieutenant governor.

== General election ==
On election day, April 2, 1787, incumbent Federalist lieutenant governor Oliver Wolcott won the election after having been chosen by the Connecticut legislature. Wolcott was sworn in for his second term on May 10, 1787.

=== Results ===
Connecticut lieutenant gubernatorial election, 1787
Party	Candidate	Votes	%
Federalist	Oliver Wolcott (incumbent)	2,213	38.47
	Scattering	3,540	61.53
Total votes		5,753	100.00
Federalist hold			
