= William L. Storrs =

American judge (1795–1861)

William Storrs

Associate Justice of the Connecticut Supreme Court
- In office 1840–1861
- Appointed by: William W. Ellsworth

Member of the U.S. House of Representatives from Connecticut's 2nd district
- In office March 4, 1839 – June 1840
- Preceded by: Samuel Ingham
- Succeeded by: William W. Boardman

Member of the U.S. House of Representatives from Connecticut's at-large district
- In office March 4, 1829 – March 3, 1831
- Preceded by: Elisha Phelps
- Succeeded by: Samuel Tweedy

Personal details
- Born: March 25, 1795 Middletown, Connecticut, U.S.
- Died: June 25, 1861 (aged 66) Hartford, Connecticut, U.S
- Party: Whig
- Other political affiliations: Anti-Jacksonian (before 1839)
- Education: Yale College

William Lucius Storrs (March 25, 1795 – June 25, 1861) was a U.S. Representative from Connecticut.

Storrs was born in Middletown, Connecticut. Among his siblings was Henry Randolph Storrs.

Storrs graduated from Yale College in 1814. He studied law and was admitted to the bar in Whitestown, New York, in 1817. He returned to Connecticut that same year and commenced practice in Middletown. He served as a member of the state house of representatives from 1827-1829 and again in 1834. He served as speaker of the state house in 1834.

Storrs was elected as an Anti-Jacksonian to the Twenty-first and Twenty-second Congresses (March 4, 1829 – March 3, 1833). He was not a candidate for renomination in 1832.

Storrs was elected as a Whig to the Twenty-sixth Congress and served from March 1839 until his resignation in June 1840. He was appointed associate judge of the Connecticut Supreme Court in 1840 and promoted to chief justice in 1856; he served as chief justice until his death.

He was a professor of law at Wesleyan University at Middletown from 1841–46, and at Yale College in 1846-47. Storrs was elected as a member to the American Philosophical Society in 1848.

He died in Hartford, Connecticut, June 25, 1861. His remains are interred in Old North Cemetery.

The Storrs Lectures given at Yale Law College were instituted in his memory.

U.S. House of Representatives
Preceded by Samuel B. Sherwood	Member of the U.S. House of Representatives from Connecticut's at-large congressional district 1829-1833	Succeeded by Samuel Tweedy
Preceded by Samuel Ingham	Member of the U.S. House of Representatives from Connecticut's 2nd congressional district 1839-1840	Succeeded by William Whiting Boardman
