= Samuel Dickinson Hubbard =

American politician (1799–1855)

Samuel Hubbard
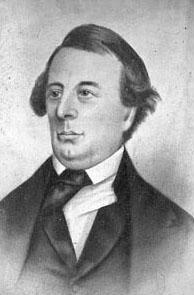

15th United States Postmaster General
- In office August 31, 1852 – March 7, 1853
- President: Millard Fillmore; Franklin Pierce
- Preceded by: Nathan K. Hall
- Succeeded by: James Campbell

Member of the U.S. House of Representatives from Connecticut's 2nd district
- In office March 4, 1845 – March 3, 1849
- Preceded by: John Stewart
- Succeeded by: Walter Booth

Personal details
- Born: Samuel Dickinson Hubbard; August 10, 1799 Middletown, Connecticut, U.S.
- Died: October 8, 1855 (aged 56) Middletown, Connecticut, U.S.
- Resting place: Indian Hill Cemetery
- Party: Whig
- Spouse: Jane Miles
- Education: Yale University (BA)

Samuel Dickinson Hubbard (August 10, 1799 – October 8, 1855) was a U.S. representative from Connecticut and the 15th U.S. postmaster general.

== Early life ==
Samuel Dickinson Hubbard was born in Middletown, Connecticut. He pursued classical studies at Yale College and graduated in 1819. He practiced law from 1823 to 1837.

== Career ==
He then found work in manufacturing, later founding the Russell Manufacturing Company with Samuel Russell in 1824.

Hubbard later got involved in politics and in 1844 he was elected to the Twenty-ninth United States Congress and later reelected to the Thirtieth Congress from Connecticut's 2nd congressional district, serving from March 4, 1845; to March 3, 1849, both terms as a Whig.

In 1852, President Millard Fillmore appointed him as United States Postmaster General serving from August 31, 1852; to March 7, 1853.

He was elected as a member of the American Antiquarian Society in 1853.

== Death ==
Hubbard died on October 8, 1855, aged 55, at his home in Middletown, Connecticut.

Political offices
Preceded by Nathan K. Hall	United States Postmaster General; Served under: Millard Fillmore; August 31, 1852 – March 7, 1853	Succeeded by James Campbell
U.S. House of Representatives
Preceded by John Stewart	Member of the U. S. House of Representatives from Connecticut's 2nd congressional district March 4, 1845 – March 3, 1849	Succeeded by Walter Booth
