= Eli Ives =

American physician (1779–1861)

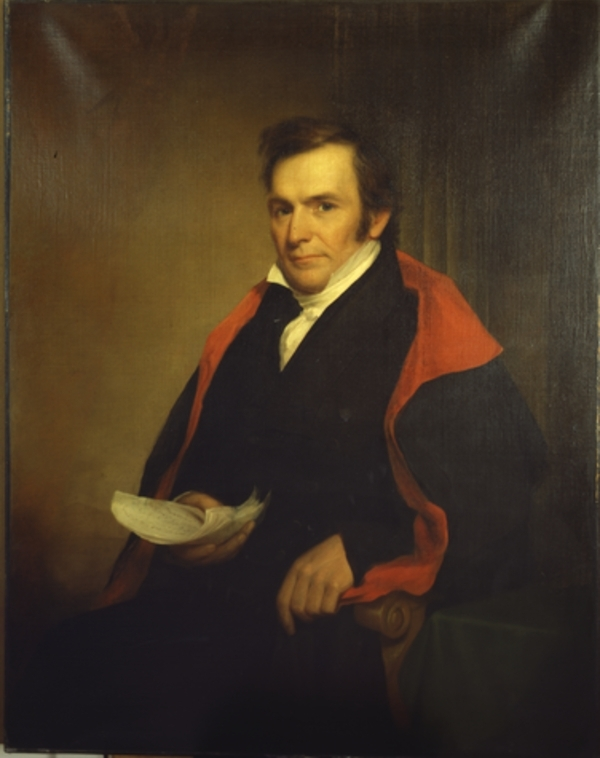
- Portrait of Ives by Nathaniel Jocelyn
- Born: February 7, 1779; New Haven, Connecticut, U.S.
- Died: October 8, 1861 (aged 82); New Haven, Connecticut, U.S.
- Occupation: Physician
- Spouse: Maria Beers (m. 1805)
- Children: 5

Eli Ives (February 7, 1779 – October 8, 1861) was an American medical doctor from Connecticut.

== Early life and education ==
Eli Ives was born on February 7, 1779, in New Haven, Connecticut, to Lydia (née Auger) and Levi Ives. He graduated from Yale University in 1799. He studied medicine with his father and Aeneas Munson. He then attended lectures in Philadelphia with Benjamin Rush and Caspar Wistar.

== Career ==
In 1801, Ives served as rector of the Hopkins Grammar School in New Haven. In the same year, he started a medical practice in New Haven and continued practicing for over 50 years.

Ives was one of the organizers of the Yale School of Medicine and the school organized in 1813. He was appointed as one of the first five professors. He was chair of Materia Medica and Botany for 16 years until 1829 when he became chair of the Theory and Practice of Medicine. In 1853, he left Yale and became professor emeritus. During his time at Yale, he supported the maintenance of its botanical garden. He was a founder of the New Haven Medical Association and a member of the Connecticut State Medical Society. In 1860, he was elected as president of the American Medical Association.

Ives published four articles in early volumes of the American Journal of Science, an oration before the Phi Beta Kappa Society in 1802, and an address before the New Haven Horticultural Society in 1837.

== Personal life ==
Ives married Maria Beers, daughter of Nathan Beers, on September 17, 1805. They had three sons and two daughters.

Ives died on October 8, 1861, at his home in New Haven. Reverend Dr. Dutton's speech at his funeral was printed in the New Englander in October 1861 and was distributed as a pamphlet.
