= 1813 Connecticut lieutenant gubernatorial election =

- April 12, 1813

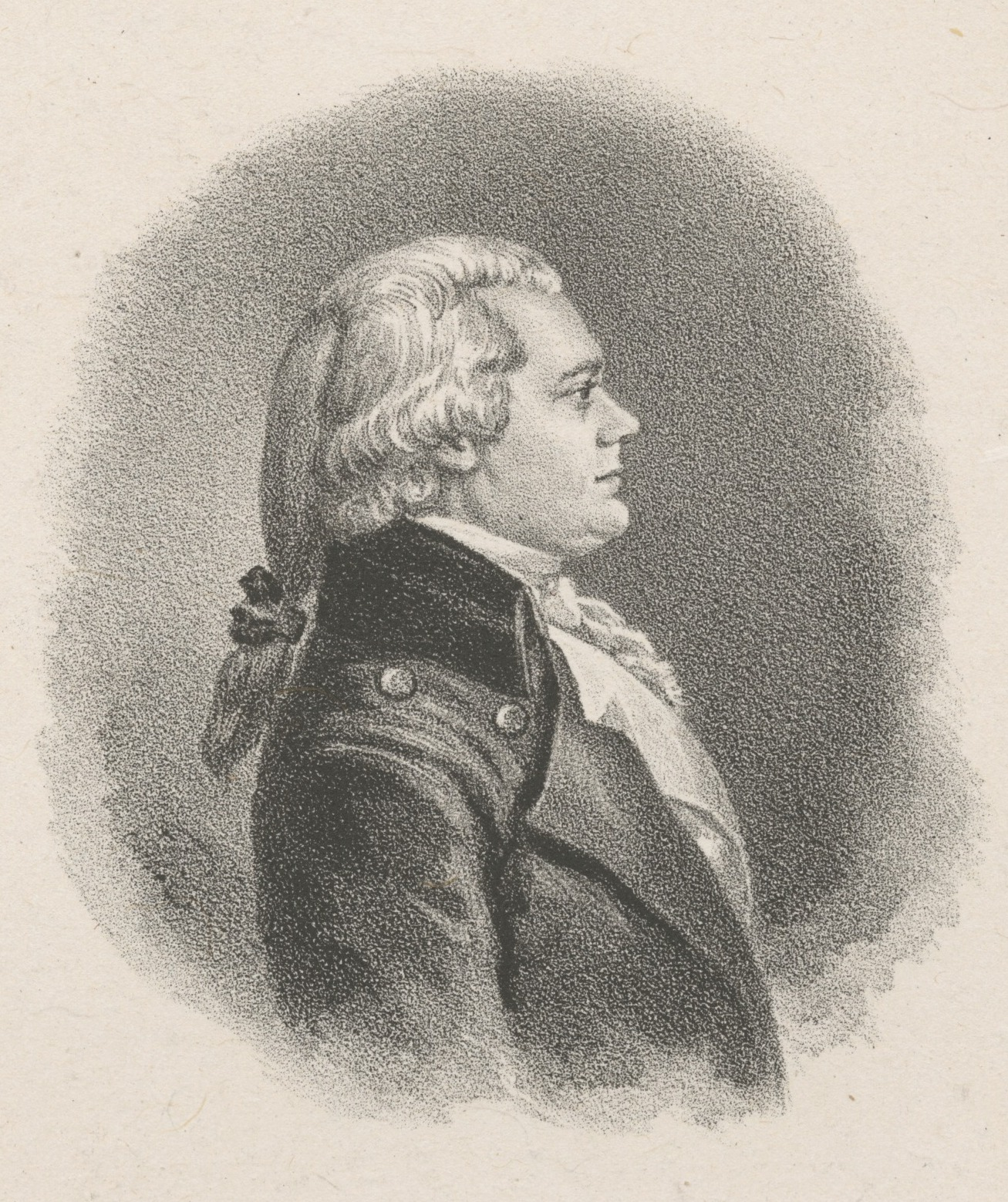

Nominee	Isaac Spencer	Chauncey Goodrich	Calvin Goddard
Party	Democratic-Republican	Federalist	Federalist
Popular vote	5,100	4,198	2,569
Percentage	31.10%	25.60%	15.70%
Lieutenant Governor before election
Vacant
Elected Lieutenant Governor
Chauncey Goodrich
Federalist

The 1813 Connecticut lieutenant gubernatorial election was held on April 12, 1813, in order to elect the lieutenant governor of Connecticut. Democratic-Republican candidate Isaac Spencer received a plurality of the votes against Federalist candidate and incumbent United States Senator from Connecticut Chauncey Goodrich and Federalist candidate and former member of the U.S. House of Representatives from Connecticut's at-large district Calvin Goddard. However, since no candidate received a majority in the popular vote, Chauncey Goodrich was elected by the Connecticut General Assembly per the Connecticut Charter of 1662.

== General election ==
On election day, April 12, 1813, Democratic-Republican candidate Isaac Spencer won a plurality of the vote by a margin of 902 votes against his foremost opponent Federalist candidate Chauncey Goodrich. However, as no candidate received a majority of the vote, the election was forwarded to the Connecticut General Assembly.

=== Results ===
Connecticut lieutenant gubernatorial election, 1813
Party	Candidate	Votes	%
Democratic-Republican	Isaac Spencer	5,100	31.10
Federalist	Chauncey Goodrich	4,198	25.60
Federalist	Calvin Goddard	2,569	15.70
	Scattering	4,534	27.60
Total votes		16,401	100.00
Democratic-Republican gain from Federalist			

== Legislative election ==
As no candidate received a majority of the vote, the Connecticut General Assembly was required to decide the election. Federalist candidate Chauncey Goodrich was ultimately elected by the Connecticut General Assembly, thereby retaining Federalist control over the office of lieutenant governor. Goodrich was sworn in for his first term on May 13, 1813.

=== Results ===
Connecticut House of Representatives election
Party	Candidate	Votes	%
Federalist	Chauncey Goodrich	148	82.70%
Democratic-Republican	Isaac Spencer	18	10.10%
Democratic-Republican	Elijah Boardman	4	2.20%
Federalist	John Treadwell	4	2.20%
Federalist	Calvin Goddard	3	1.70%
Federalist	John Cotton Smith	2	1.10%
Total votes		179	100.00%
Federalist hold			
