= Roy C. Wilcox =

American politician (1891–1975)

Member of the Connecticut Senate from the 13th district
- In office 1927–1931
- Preceded by: Eugene P. Golden
- Succeeded by: Wayne Robison

Personal details
- Born: Roy Cornwell Wilcox; December 24, 1891 Meriden, Connecticut, U.S.
- Died: March 30, 1975 (aged 83) Meriden, Connecticut, U.S.
- Party: Republican
- Spouse: Katherine Smith Wilcox
- Education: Yale University

Roy Cornwell Wilcox (December 24, 1891 – March 30, 1975) was an American politician who was the 83rd Lieutenant Governor of Connecticut from 1933 to 1935. He previously served as President pro tempore of the Connecticut Senate.

== Personal life ==
Wilcox was born on December 24, 1891, in Meriden, Connecticut, to parents George H. and Nettie Curtis Wilcox. He was married to Katherine Smith Wilcox, with whom he had a daughter.

Wilcox graduated from Yale University.

== Death ==
Wilcox died on March 30, 1975, at Meriden-Wallingford Hospital in Meriden, Connecticut, following a short illness. He was 83.

Political offices
Preceded by Samuel R. Spencer	Connecticut State Treasurer; 1931–1933	Succeeded by J. William Hope
Preceded by Samuel R. Spencer	Lieutenant Governor of Connecticut; 1933-1935	Succeeded by T. Frank Hayes
