= Julius Hotchkiss =

American politician

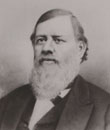

55th Lieutenant Governor of Connecticut
- In office May 4, 1870 – May 16, 1871
- Governor: James E. English
- Preceded by: Francis Wayland III
- Succeeded by: Morris Tyler

Member of the U.S. House of Representatives from Connecticut's 2nd district
- In office March 4, 1867 – March 3, 1869
- Preceded by: Samuel L. Warner
- Succeeded by: Stephen Wright Kellogg

Personal details
- Born: July 11, 1810 Waterbury, Connecticut, U.S.
- Died: December 23, 1878 (aged 68) Middletown, Connecticut, U.S
- Party: Democratic

Julius Hotchkiss (July 11, 1810 – December 23, 1878) was a United States representative from Connecticut. He was born in Waterbury, Connecticut, the son of Woodward and Polly (Castle) Hotchkiss, Prospect farmers. At seventeen, he taught in Prospect schools. He later moved to Waterbury and ran a store and a factory that made cotton webbing and suspenders.

== Personal life ==
In 1832, he married Melissa Perkins (of Oxford) with whom he had five children and were members of The New Church.

== Public office ==
Hotchkiss was nominated by both parties to be the first mayor of Waterbury in 1853 when it was incorporated, shifting to the Democratic Party when the Whigs had dissolved. In 1851 and 1858, he served as a member of the Connecticut House of Representatives. He was elected as a Democrat to the Fortieth Congress (March 4, 1867 – March 3, 1869). After leaving Congress, he was the 55th Lieutenant Governor of Connecticut in 1870. He died in Middletown in 1878 and was buried in Pine Grove Cemetery.

U.S. House of Representatives
Preceded by Samuel L. Warner	Member of the U.S. House of Representatives from Connecticut's 2nd congressional district 1867–1869	Succeeded by Stephen W. Kellogg
Political offices
Preceded by Francis Wayland III	Lieutenant Governor of Connecticut; 1870–1871	Succeeded by Morris Tyler
