= Samuel R. Spencer =

American politician (1871–1961)

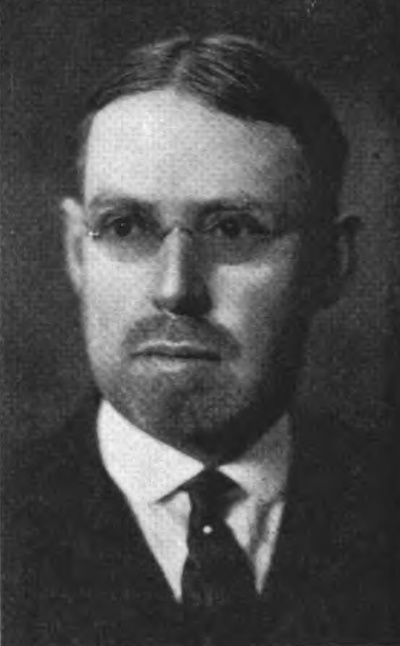
- Spencer in 1918

Lieutenant Governor of Connecticut
- In office 1931–1933
- Governor: Wilbur Lucius Cross

Connecticut State Treasurer
- In office 1929–1931
- Governor: John H. Trumbull

Personal details
- Born: November 4, 1871 Suffield, Connecticut, US
- Died: September 29, 1961 (aged 89) Suffield, Connecticut
- Party: Republican Party
- Education: Suffield Academy
- Alma mater: Yale University
- Occupation: Politician, businessman

Samuel Reid Spencer (November 4, 1871 – September 29, 1961) was an American politician who served as Connecticut State Treasurer from 1929 to 1931 and as the 82nd Lieutenant Governor of Connecticut from 1931 to 1933. He was the first blind lieutenant governor of Connecticut.

== Early life and education ==
Spencer was born in Suffield, Connecticut, on November 4, 1871, to Alfred and Caroline Frances (Reid) Spencer. He attended Suffield Academy and received his Bachelor of Arts degree from Yale University in 1893. He worked in Windsor Locks for the J. R. Montgomery Company, a textile manufacturing firm, from 1893 to 1900. In 1900, he and his older brother, Clinton Spencer (1856–1917) co-founded the Spencer Brothers hardware, lumber, coal, and grain company in Suffield.

== Political and civic career ==
Spencer was a lifelong resident of Suffield and served as the town treasurer for 33 years starting in 1900. A Republican, Spencer served in the Connecticut House of Representatives in 1915 and 1917 and in the Connecticut State Senate in 1927. Spencer went on to serve as state treasurer (1929–1931) and lieutenant governor (1931–1933) under fellow Republican governors John H. Trumbull and Wilbur Lucius Cross. In addition, he held several appointed offices, including state commissioner of motor vehicles and member of the state board of finance and the state liquor control commission.

Along his state service, Spencer was president of the Suffield Savings Bank from 1914 to 1951 and served on the boards of the First National Bank in Suffield, the Hartford Mutual Fire Insurance Company, the J. R. Montgomery Company, the Suffield Town Forest Commission, the Suffield Academy, the Kent Memorial Library, and the Eastern States Exposition.

Spencer was a long-time trustee (1933–1949) and chair of the board (1943–1949) of the University of Connecticut. UConn named the Spencer Residence Hall (now Chandler House and Lancaster House) in his honor.

== Personal life ==
Spencer married Helena Ellsworth Bailey in 1899. The couple were known for their commitment to conservation. Spencer planted about a thousand oak and maple trees along Suffield highways. Helena Bailey-Spencer willed Bailey's Ravine (an 80-acre natural area in Franklin, Connecticut) to the Nature Conservancy in 1989.

Spencer died after a long illness at his Suffield home on September 29, 1961. He had no children. He had been blind for 20 years at the time of his death.

Political offices
Preceded by Ernest E. Rogers	Connecticut State Treasurer; 1929–1931	Succeeded by Roy C. Wilcox
Preceded by Ernest E. Rogers	Lieutenant Governor of Connecticut; 1931–1933	Succeeded by Roy C. Wilcox
