= John Stewart (Connecticut politician) =

American politician (1795–1860)

- Born: February 10, 1795; Chatham, Connecticut
- Died: September 16, 1860 (aged 65); Chatham, Connecticut
- Occupation: Politician
- Known for: 28th Congress, US Representative
- Predecessor: William Whiting Boardman
- Successor: Samuel Dickinson Hubbard

John Stewart (February 10, 1795 – September 16, 1860) was an American merchant and politician who served one term as a U.S. representative from Connecticut from 1843 to 1845.

== Biography ==
Born in Chatham, Connecticut, Stewart completed preparatory studies. He became engaged in shipbuilding and in the mercantile business in Middle Haddam.

=== Political career ===
He served as member of the Connecticut House of Representatives in 1830, and in the Connecticut State Senate from 1832 to 1837.

He served as judge of the county court of Middletown, in Middlesex County, Connecticut.

Stewart was elected as a Democrat to the 28th Congress, serving from March 4, 1843 to March 3, 1845. He was an unsuccessful candidate for reelection in 1844, to the 29th Congress.

=== Later career ===
He thereafter resumed shipbuilding pursuits, serving in the State Senate again in 1846, and in the State House of Representatives again in 1854.

=== Death and burial ===
Stewart died in Chatham, Connecticut, and was interred in Union Hill Cemetery at Middle Haddam, Chatham, Connecticut.

U.S. House of Representatives
Preceded by William Whiting Boardman	Member of the U.S. House of Representatives from Connecticut's 2nd congressional district 1843-1845	Succeeded by Samuel Dickinson Hubbard
