= Thaddeus Betts =

American politician

Thaddeus Laddins Betts

United States Senator from Connecticut
- In office March 4, 1839 – April 7, 1840
- Preceded by: John M. Niles
- Succeeded by: Jabez W. Huntington

32nd and 34th Lieutenant Governor of Connecticut
- In office May 4, 1832 – May 1, 1833
- Governor: John Samuel Peters
- Preceded by: Vacant
- Succeeded by: Ebenezer Stoddard
- In office May 7, 1834 – May 6, 1835
- Governor: Samuel A. Foot
- Preceded by: Ebenezer Stoddard
- Succeeded by: Ebenezer Stoddard

Member of the Connecticut Senate from the 12th District
- In office 1831–1832
- Preceded by: Charles Hawley
- Succeeded by: Charles Hawley

At-large member of the Connecticut Senate
- In office 1828–1830

Member of the Connecticut House of Representatives from Norwalk
- In office May 1815 – October 1815 Serving with Benjamin Isaacs
- Preceded by: Jacob Osborne, Lewis Mallory
- Succeeded by: Benjamin Isaacs, John Eversley
- In office 1830–1831 Serving with Eli Bennett
- Preceded by: Clark Bissell, Charles W. Taylor
- Succeeded by: Eli Bennett, David Roberts

Personal details
- Born: February 4, 1789 Norwalk, Connecticut
- Died: April 7, 1840 (aged 51) Washington, D.C.
- Resting place: Union Cemetery, Norwalk
- Party: Whig
- Spouse: Antoinette Cannon Betts
- Education: Yale College
- Occupation: lawyer

Thaddeus Laddins Betts (February 4, 1789 – April 7, 1840) was the 32nd and 34th lieutenant governor of the state of Connecticut from 1832 to 1833 and from 1834 to 1835, and a United States senator from Connecticut from 1839 to 1840. He had previously served in the Connecticut Senate representing the 12th district and Connecticut House of Representatives from Norwalk, Connecticut.

== Biography ==
Betts was born in Norwalk, Connecticut. He was the son of William Maltby Betts (1759-1832) and Lucretia (Gregory) Betts (1763-1830). He completed preparatory studies, then attended and was graduated from Yale College in 1807. He studied law, and was admitted to the bar in 1810. He began his law practice in Norwalk. He married Antoinette Cannon who was born on April 20, 1789, and died on February 26, 1864.

== Career ==
Betts was a member of the Connecticut House of Representatives in 1815. He was a member of the Connecticut Senate in 1828 as a senator at-large, and was again a member of the state house of representatives in 1830. Betts was then a member of the Connecticut Senate in 1831 representing the 12th District.

In 1832 and 1834, Betts was elected the 32nd and 34th Lieutenant Governor of Connecticut and served two terms, under Governors John Samuel Peters from 1832 to 1833 and under Samuel A. Foot from 1834 to 1835.

Elected as a Whig to the U.S. Senate, Betts served from March 4, 1839 until his death in 1840.

== Death ==
Betts died in Washington, D.C., on April 7, 1840 (age 51 years, 63 days). The funeral took place at the Capitol with the Chaplains to Congress officiating and the President of the United States, Martin Van Buren, attending. He is interred at Union Cemetery, Norwalk, Connecticut. There is a cenotaph for him at the Congressional Cemetery, Washington, D.C.

== See also ==
- List of members of the United States Congress who died in office (1790–1899)

U.S. Senate
Preceded by Jacob Osborne; Lewis Mallory	Member of the Connecticut House of Representatives from Norwalk; May 1815 – October 1815; With: Benjamin Isaacs	Succeeded by Benjamin Isaacs; John Eversley
Preceded by	Connecticut senator At-large; 1828–1830	Succeeded by District elections
Preceded by Clark Bissell; Charles W. Taylor	Member of the Connecticut House of Representatives from Norwalk; 1830–1831; With: Eli B. Bennett	Succeeded by Eli Bennett; David Roberts
Preceded by Charles Hawley	Connecticut senator from the 12th District; 1831–1832	Succeeded by Charles Hawley
Preceded by John Samuel Peters	Lieutenant Governor of Connecticut; 1832–1833	Succeeded by Ebenezer Stoddard
Preceded by Ebenezer Stoddard	Lieutenant Governor of Connecticut; 1834–1835	Succeeded by Ebenezer Stoddard
Preceded by John M. Niles	U.S. senator (Class 1) from Connecticut; March 4, 1839 – April 7, 1840; Served alongside: Perry Smith	Succeeded by Jabez W. Huntington
