= T. Frank Hayes =

American politician (1883–1965)

84th Lieutenant Governor of Connecticut
- In office January 9, 1935 – January 4, 1939
- Governor: Wilbur Lucius Cross
- Preceded by: Roy C. Wilcox
- Succeeded by: James L. McConaughy

Mayor of Waterbury, Connecticut
- In office January 1, 1930 – September 2, 1939
- Preceded by: Francis P. Guilfoile
- Succeeded by: Patrick M. Perriello

Personal details
- Born: July 6, 1883 Waterbury, Connecticut
- Died: March 27, 1965 (aged 81) Waterbury, Connecticut
- Party: Democratic
- Education: Georgetown University

T. Frank Hayes (July 6, 1883 – March 27, 1965) was an American politician who was the 84th Lieutenant Governor of Connecticut from 1935 to 1939, and mayor of Waterbury, Connecticut from 1930 until his resignation in 1939. While serving as mayor, he was charged with conspiracy, corruption and defrauding the town of Waterbury of more than one million dollars. Hayes was convicted and served 6 years in Wethersfield State Prison.

== Early life and political background ==
Hayes was born in Waterbury, Connecticut, to wealthy Irish parents, who owned a liquor store business and real estate in Waterbury. Hayes graduated from Georgetown University. After his father's death in 1913, Hayes assumed control of the family businesses, which included real estate, a brewery and the Jacques Theater. He was also a bank director of a local bank, and president of Lux Clock Company. Between 1927 and 1930, he was a state legislator and was a delegate to the Democratic National Convention in 1932 and 1936. In 1934 he was elected lieutenant-governor under Wilbur Lucius Cross.

== Mayor of Waterbury ==
Hayes was elected mayor in 1929, his position as mayor was in addition to his position as lieutenant-governor, which he held at the same time. Upon taking office in 1930, Hayes changed the city charter, effectively giving him power to make all employment decisions and created a no-bid city contracts system. At least $600,000 in city funds were paid for contracting work that was never done, and fees of $175,000 were split among Hayes, his associates in the mayor's office, and vendors and contractors. Another scam included distributing $100,000 to city officials, from money saved on the city's electric bills. There were additional allegations of corruption involving invoices for services that never happened; cleaning and refacement of a brass statute, cleaning and polishing the marble in the city hall building, and payments for police vehicles that were never ordered or delivered.

In the 1937 election, Hayes won by a margin of only 55 votes over his Republican opponent. Daniel Leary, the incumbent city comptroller, who was involved in the corruption, was defeated by Sherwood Rowland who took over as comptroller. Rowland uncovered the illegal activity involving millions of dollars funneled to Hayes and his associates and leaked his findings to the local newspaper, Waterbury Republican and American. Based on the newspaper stories, the following year a grand jury indicted Hayes, four other city officials and 23 others. They were accused of various kickback schemes, massive fraud, conspiracy and corruption. Hayes was convicted of accepting one million dollars of illegal funds and sentenced to 10 to 15 years in prison. Hayes reported to prison on March 6, 1941, and served six years in Wethersfield State Prison.

== Personal life ==
Hayes never married, and lived with his mother until she died. After being released on parole, he returned to Waterbury where he remained until his death in 1965 of a fatal heart attack.

== See also ==
- Bribery

Political offices
Preceded by Roy C. Wilcox	Lieutenant Governor of Connecticut; 1935-1939	Succeeded by James L. McConaughy
Preceded by Francis P. Guilfoile	Mayor of Waterbury, Connecticut; 1930-1939	Succeeded by Patrick M. Perriello
