= Morris Tyler =

American politician

Morris Tyler (1806 – 1876) was an American politician who was the 56th Lieutenant Governor of Connecticut from 1871 to 1873.

He was a manufacturer and wholesaler of boots and shoes. He was active in politics as a Republican. In 1863–65, he served as Mayor of New Haven, Connecticut.

In 1871, he won a very close and disputed election for Lieutenant Governor, with a reported 47,598 votes, versus 47,263 for incumbent Lieutenant Governor Julius Hotchkiss.

== Personal life ==
He married Mary Frisbie Butler, and was the father of telephone industry pioneer Morris Franklin Tyler. He died in 1876.

Political offices
Preceded by Julius Hotchkiss	Lieutenant Governor of Connecticut; 1871-1873	Succeeded by George G. Sill
