= Charles Hawley =

American politician

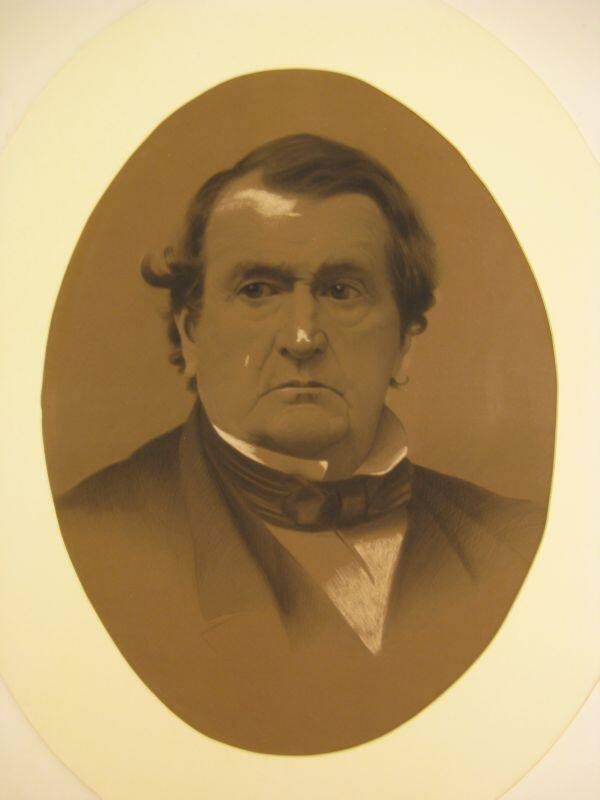
- portrait by his daughter, Elizabeth King Hawley

36th Lieutenant Governor of Connecticut
- In office May 2, 1838 – May 4, 1842
- Governor: William W. Ellsworth
- Preceded by: Ebenezer Stoddard
- Succeeded by: William S. Holabird

Member of the Connecticut Senate from the 12th District
- In office 1830–1831
- Preceded by: At large elections
- Succeeded by: Thaddeus Betts
- In office 1832–1836
- Preceded by: Thaddeus Betts
- Succeeded by: Benjamin Isaacs
- In office 1837–1838
- Preceded by: Benjamin Isaacs
- Succeeded by: Thomas B. Butler

Member of the Connecticut House of Representatives from Stamford
- In office 1821–1822 Serving with Joseph Wood
- Preceded by: Thaddeus Bell, John Augur
- Succeeded by: Daniel Lockwood, Joseph Wood
- In office 1823–1824 Serving with Daniel Lockwood
- Preceded by: Daniel Lockwood, Joseph Wood
- Succeeded by: Isaac Lockwood, Theodore Davenport
- In office 1826–1829
- Preceded by: Isaac Lockwood, Theodore Davenport
- Succeeded by: Simeon H. Minor, William Waterbury, Jr.

Personal details
- Born: June 15, 1792 Huntington, Connecticut
- Died: February 27, 1866 (aged 73) Stamford, Connecticut
- Party: Whig
- Spouse: Mary S. Holly (m. 1821)
- Education: Yale College (1813)

Charles Hawley (June 15, 1792 – February 27, 1866) was an American politician, judge, and the 36th Lieutenant Governor of Connecticut from 1838 to 1842.

== Early life ==
Hawley was born in that part of Huntington, Connecticut, which now constitutes the town of Monroe. He graduated with honor at Yale College in 1813. He studied law, partly at Newtown with Asa Chapman, soon after a judge at the Supreme Court, and partly at Litchfield with Judge Gould. He was admitted to the bar in Fairfield County, Connecticut, in 1815 or early 1816, and opened an office in Stamford. After a brief time in East Haddam, he returned to Stamford and remained there for the rest of his life. In 1824, he was appointed Judge of Probate for the district of Stamford, a district which then embraced many towns, an office which he held until 1838.

In 1821, he married Mary Stiles Holly, with whom he had children, most of whom survived him. He was a firm believer in the Christian religion and a member of the Congregational Church in Stamford.

== Political career ==
Hawley repeatedly represented the town of Stamford in the Connecticut House of Representatives and was also a member of the Connecticut Senate representing the 12th District. As a Whig, he held the office of Lieutenant Governor of Connecticut for four periods, from May 2, 1838 until May 4, 1842, while William W. Ellsworth was Governor of the state.

He died in Stamford on February 27, 1866, aged 74.

Preceded by Thaddeus Bell; John Augur	Member of the Connecticut House of Representatives from Stamford; 1821; With: Joseph Wood	Succeeded by Daniel Lockwood; Joseph Wood
Preceded by Daniel Lockwood; Joseph Wood	Member of the Connecticut House of Representatives from Stamford; 1823–1824; With: Daniel Lockwood	Succeeded by Isaac Lockwood; Theodore Davenport
Preceded by Isaac Lockwood; Theodore Davenport	Member of the Connecticut House of Representatives from Stamford; 1826–1829; With: Jotham Hoyt	Succeeded by Simeon H. Minor; William Waterbury, Jr.
Preceded by At large elections	Member of the Connecticut Senate from the 12th District; 1830–1831	Succeeded by Thaddeus Betts
Preceded by Thaddeus Betts	Member of the Connecticut Senate from the 12th District; 1832–1836	Succeeded by Benjamin Isaacs
Preceded by Benjamin Isaacs	Member of the Connecticut Senate from the 12th District; 1837–1838	Succeeded by Thomas B. Butler
Preceded by Ebenezer Stoddard	Lieutenant Governor of Connecticut; 1838–1842	Succeeded by William S. Holabird
