= George G. Sill =

American politician (1829-1907)

George Griswold Sill
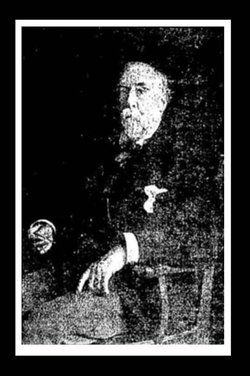

United States Attorney for the District of Connecticut
- In office 1888–1892
- President: Grover Cleveland; Benjamin Harrison
- Preceded by: Lewis E. Stanton
- Succeeded by: George P. McLean

Personal details
- Born: October 26, 1829 Windsor, Connecticut, U.S.
- Died: May 19, 1907 (aged 77)
- Education: Yale

George Griswold Sill (October 26, 1829 – May 19, 1907) was an American politician who was the 57th Lieutenant Governor of Connecticut from 1873 to 1877.

== Early life ==
Sill was born in Windsor, Connecticut. After preparatory studies at Ellington Academy, he attended Yale University from 1848 to 1852 and was a member of Skull and Bones. He studied law and was admitted to the Hartford County Bar in 1856.

When the American Civil War broke out, he organized the first company of Connecticut Volunteers in his office and went to the front.

Sill was also the head of several large firms and corporations, serving as President of the Hartford Governor Company and Director of the Mutual Benefit Life Insurance Company.

== Political career ==
After voting Republican from the first vote he could cast, Sill changed parties to the Democrats in 1872, under the leadership of Horace Greeley. In 1873, he was nominated by the Democrats for the election for Lieutenant Governor of Connecticut and won a large plurality. He served in four consecutive one-year terms, while Charles R. Ingersoll was the Governor, from May 7, 1873, to January 3, 1877. These were the last one-year terms, changes in the Connecticut State Constitution made the terms for governor and lieutenant governor two years long from 1877 on, putting the election in November the year before and having the term start in January.

== Later years ==
Sill was a U.S. Attorney for Connecticut from 1888 to 1892.

He died at his home on the night of May 19, 1907, following an attack of locomotor ataxia.

Political offices
| Preceded by Morris Tyler | Lieutenant Governor of Connecticut; 1873–1877 | Succeeded by Francis Loomis |
