= Ebenezer Stoddard =

American politician

Member of the United States House of Representatives from Connecticut
- In office March 4, 1821 – March 3, 1825

33rd and 35th Lieutenant Governor of Connecticut
- In office May 1, 1833 – May 7, 1834
- Governor: Henry W. Edwards
- Preceded by: Thaddeus Betts
- Succeeded by: Thaddeus Betts
- In office May 6, 1835 – May 2, 1838
- Governor: Henry W. Edwards
- Preceded by: Thaddeus Betts
- Succeeded by: Charles Hawley

Personal details
- Born: May 6, 1785 Union, Connecticut
- Died: August 19, 1847 (aged 82) West Woodstock, Woodstock, Connecticut
- Party: Democratic-Republican, Adams-Clay Republican
- Children: 2
- Education: Brown University (1807)

Ebenezer Stoddard (May 6, 1785 – August 19, 1847) was a United States representative from Connecticut. He was born in Union, Connecticut. He attended Woodstock Academy in 1802 and in 1803 and graduated from Brown University in 1807. After studying, he was admitted to the bar in 1810 and commenced practice in West Woodstock.

Stoddard was elected as a Democratic-Republican to the Seventeenth Congress and reelected as an Adams-Clay Republican candidate to the Eighteenth Congress (March 4, 1821 – March 3, 1825). After leaving Congress, he sat in the Connecticut Senate in 1825–1827. He was the 33rd and 35th lieutenant governor of the state in 1833 and 1835–1837. He continued to practice law before dying in West Woodstock in 1847. He was buried in Bungay Cemetery.

Political offices
Preceded by Thaddeus Betts	Lieutenant Governor of Connecticut; 1833–1834	Succeeded by Thaddeus Betts
Preceded by Thaddeus Betts	Lieutenant Governor of Connecticut; 1835–1838	Succeeded by Charles Hawley
