= 1835 Connecticut gubernatorial election =

- April 6, 1835
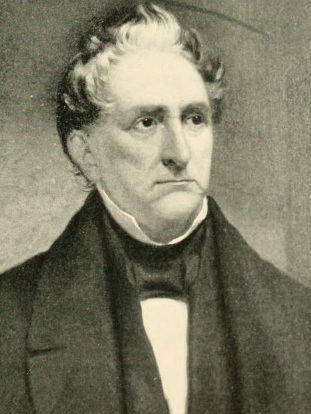

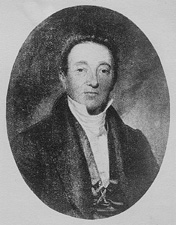
Nominee	Henry W. Edwards	Samuel A. Foot
Party	Democratic	Whig
Popular vote	22,129	19,835
Percentage	52.13%	46.72%
- Edwards: 40–50% 50–60% 60–70% 70–80% Foot: 40–50% 50–60% 60–70% 70–80% 80–90% No Vote/Data
Governor before election
Samuel A. Foot
Whig
Elected Governor
Henry W. Edwards
Democratic

The 1835 Connecticut gubernatorial election was held on April 6, 1835. It was a rematch of the 1834 Connecticut gubernatorial election. Former governor, senator and Democratic nominee Henry W. Edwards was elected, defeating incumbent governor and Whig nominee Samuel A. Foot with 52.13% of the vote.

This was the last appearance of the Anti-Masonic Party in a Connecticut gubernatorial election.

== General election ==
=== Candidates ===
Major party candidates

- Henry W. Edwards, Democratic
- Samuel A. Foot, Whig

Minor party candidates

- Zalmon Storrs, Anti-Masonic

=== Results ===
1835 Connecticut gubernatorial election
Party	Candidate	Votes	%	±%
Democratic	Henry W. Edwards	22,129	52.13%	
Whig	Samuel A. Foot (incumbent)	19,835	46.72%	
Anti-Masonic	Zalmon Storrs	489	1.15%	
Majority		2,294		
Turnout				
Democratic gain from Whig		Swing		
