= 1799 Connecticut gubernatorial election =

- November 1, 1799
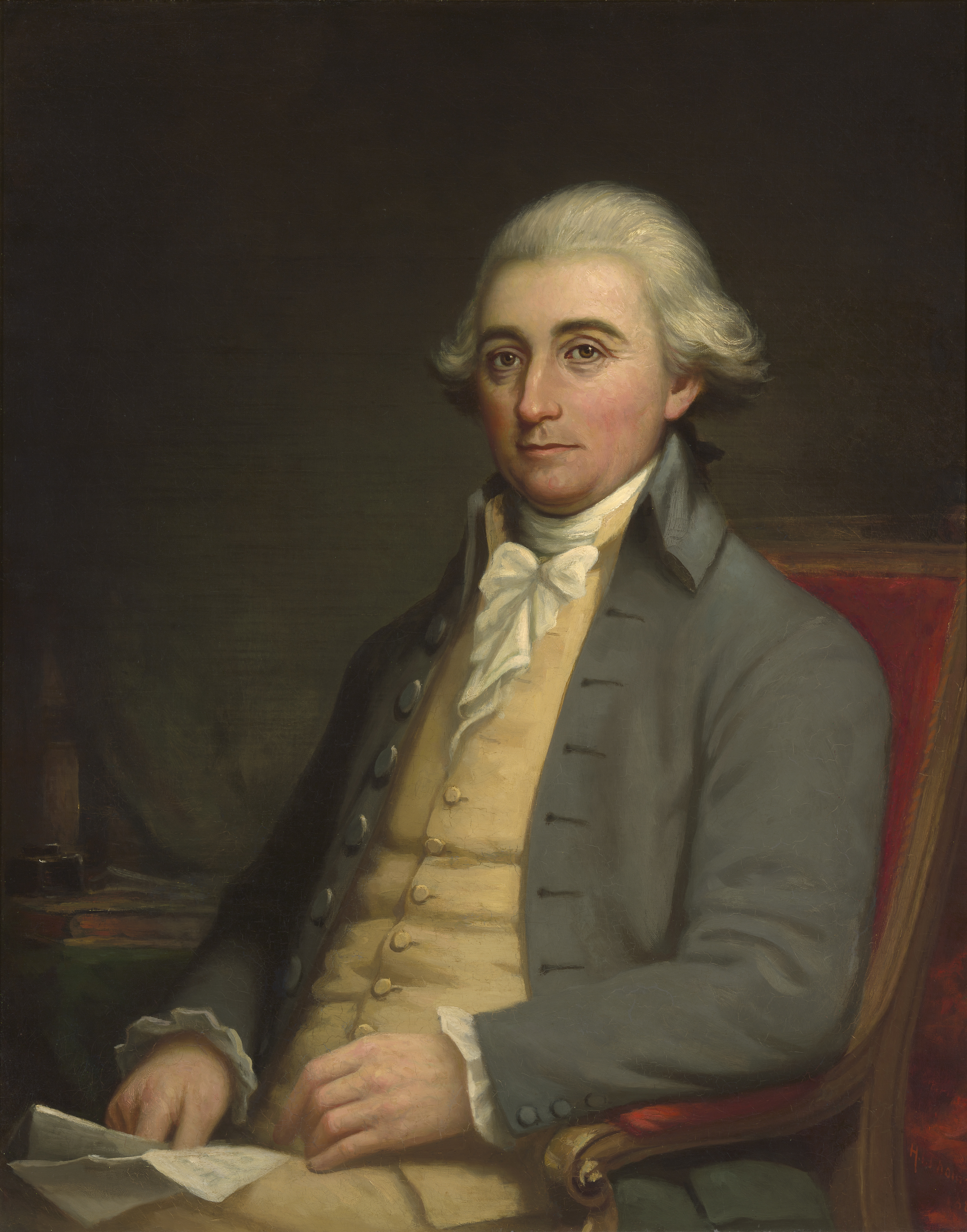
Nominee	Jonathan Trumbull Jr.
Party	Federalist
Popular vote	4,179
Percentage	100.00%
Governor before election
Jonathan Trumbull Jr.
Federalist
Elected Governor
Jonathan Trumbull Jr.
Federalist

The 1799 Connecticut gubernatorial election was held on November 1, 1799, in order to elect the Governor of Connecticut. Incumbent Federalist Governor of Connecticut Jonathan Trumbull Jr. won re-election as he ran unopposed.

== General election ==
On election day, November 1, 1799, Federalist nominee Jonathan Trumbull Jr. easily won re-election as he ran unopposed. Trumbull was sworn in for his second term on December 2, 1799.

=== Results ===
Connecticut gubernatorial election, 1799
Party	Candidate	Votes	%
Federalist	Jonathan Trumbull Jr. (incumbent)	4,179	100.00
Total votes		4,179	100.00
Federalist hold			
