= Zalmon Storrs =

American judge and politician (1779–1867)

Zalmon Storrs (December 18, 1779 – February 17, 1867) was an American judge and politician.

He was the son of Dan and Euth (Conant) Storrs, and was born in Mansfield, Connecticut, December 18, 1779. He was a descendant of Samuel Storrs, who emigrated from Nottinghamshire to Connecticut in 1663. He was a distant cousin of Charles and Augustus Storrs, after whom Storrs, Connecticut is named.

He graduated from Yale College in 1801. He began his legal studies in 1802 with judge Thomas Scott Williams, of Hartford, Connecticut, then a resident of Mansfield; but the death of his brother threw upon him the care of his father's store, and led him to relinquish his law studies.

During his long life he several times represented his native town in the Connecticut State Legislature, was for a period of six years Judge of Probate for the district of Mansfield, for twenty years Postmaster at Mansfield Center, and for thirty-five years Justice of the Peace, holding the latter office until he reached the age of seventy years, the limit fixed by the law of the State.

He ran as an Anti-Mason for governor four times, in 1831, 1833, 1834, and 1835. None of these attempts were successful.

He died at Mansfield, Connecticut, February 17, 1867, aged 87 years. He was the last survivor of the Yale Class of 1801.
