= Calvin Willey =

American politician (1776–1858)

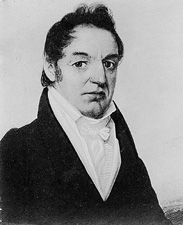

Chair of the Senate Agriculture Committee
- In office 1826–1827
- Preceded by: William Findlay
- Succeeded by: John Branch

United States Senator from Connecticut
- In office May 4, 1825 – March 3, 1831
- Preceded by: James Lanman
- Succeeded by: Gideon Tomlinson

Member of the Connecticut House of Representatives
- In office 1820-1821; 1812; 1810; 1805–1806

Member of the Connecticut Senate
- In office 1823–1824

Personal details
- Born: September 15, 1776 East Haddam, Connecticut, US
- Died: August 23, 1858 (aged 81) Stafford, Connecticut, US
- Party: National Republican (1825-1831); Democratic (1832)

Calvin Willey (September 15, 1776 – August 23, 1858) was an American politician from Connecticut who served in the United States Senate from 1825 to 1831.

== Early life and education ==
Willey was born in East Haddam, Connecticut, and attended common schools. He began to study law in Hebron, Connecticut, in 1795 and was admitted to the bar in February 1798.

== Career ==
Willey established a legal practice in Chatham and moved to Stafford in 1800. He was appointed the first postmaster at Stafford Springs, a position he held from 1806 to 1808. He lived in Stafford until 1808, when he moved to Tolland. Later, he was also a postmaster of Tolland from 1812 to 1816.

Willey was elected member of the Connecticut House of Representatives for Stafford twice and served from 1805 to 1806. He was also a member of the State house of representatives 1810, 1812, 1820–1821, this time representing Tolland. He was judge of probate for Stafford district 1818–1825. In 1823–1824, he was a member of the Connecticut State Senate. He was elector in the 1824 United States presidential election. He was elected to the United States Senate for the term which started on March 4, 1825, but did not assume office until May 4, 1825. He served for the rest of the term to March 3, 1831. He was also the chairman for the United States Senate Committee on Agriculture, Nutrition, and Forestry in the Nineteenth Congress.

After leaving Congress, he held no more public offices, but continued to practice law. He ran for governor of Connecticut as a Democrat in 1832, but was unsuccessful.

== Personal life ==
He died in Stafford, Connecticut, August 23, 1858, and was interred in Skungamaug Cemetery in Tolland.

Party political offices
| First | Democratic nominee for Governor of Connecticut; 1832 | Succeeded by Henry W. Edwards |
U.S. Senate
| Preceded by James Lanman | U.S. senator (Class 3) from Connecticut; 1825–1831; Served alongside: Henry Waggaman Edwards, Samuel A. Foot | Succeeded by Gideon Tomlinson |
