= 1831 Connecticut gubernatorial election =

- April 8, 1831
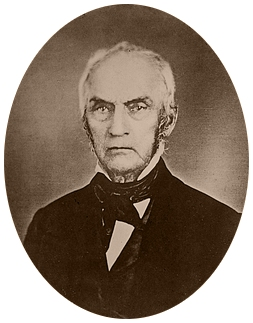

| Nominee | John S. Peters | Zalmon Storrs |
| Party | National Republican | Anti-Masonic |
| Popular vote | 12,819 | 4,778 |
| Percentage | 68.75% | 25.62% |
- Peters: 50–60% 60–70% 70–80% 80–90% 90–100% Storrs: 50–60% 60–70% 70–80% Edwards: 30–40% No Vote/Data
Governor before election
John S. Peters (acting)
National Republican
Elected Governor
John S. Peters
National Republican

The 1831 Connecticut gubernatorial election was held on April 8, 1831. Incumbent acting governor and National Republican nominee John S. Peters was elected to a term in his own right after the resignation of his predecessor Gideon Tomlinson, defeating Anti-Masonic nominee Zalmon Storrs with 68.75% of the vote.

As the election took place during the early Second Party System, this was the last time a candidate for the governor's office would be listed under the Federalist banner.

== General election ==
=== Candidates ===
Major party candidates

- John S. Peters, National Republican

Minor party candidates

- Zalmon Storrs, Anti-Masonic
- Henry W. Edwards, Jacksonian
- John T. Riley
- Timothy Pitkin, Federalist

=== Results ===
1831 Connecticut gubernatorial election
| Party | Candidate | Votes | % | ±% |
|---|---|---|---|---|
| National Republican | John S. Peters (incumbent) | 12,819 | 68.75% | |
| Anti-Masonic | Zalmon Storrs | 4,778 | 25.62% | |
| Jacksonian | Henry W. Edwards | 344 | 1.85% | |
| Other | Others | 322 | 1.73% | |
| Independent | John T. Riley | 228 | 1.22% | |
| Federalist | Timothy Pitkin | 156 | 0.84% | |
| Majority | | 8,041 | | |
| Turnout | | | | |
| National Republican hold | | Swing | | |
