= Ephraim Kirby =

American judge (1757–1804)

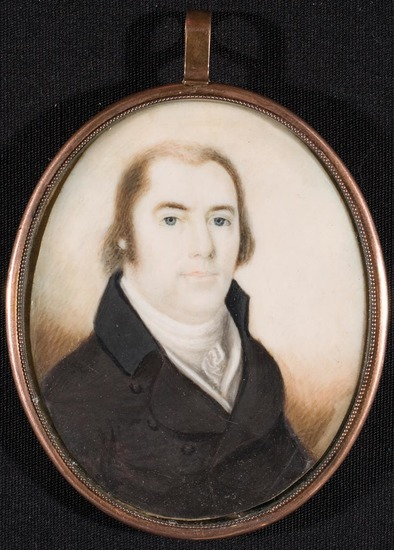
- Born: February 23, 1757; Woodbury
- Died: October 4, 1804 (aged 47); Fort Stoddert
- Occupation: Politician
- Children: Frances Kirby Smith, Edmund Kirby
- Parent(s): Abraham Kirby

Ephraim Kirby (February 23, 1757 – October 4, 1804) was an American Revolutionary War soldier, published the first volume of law reports in the United States, was the first General High Priest of the Royal Arch Masons of the United States, and was the first judge of the Superior Court of the Mississippi Territory.

== Early life ==
Kirby was born in Woodbury, Connecticut, the son of Abraham Kirby and the great-great grandson of Joseph Kirby who emigrated from Warwickshire to Hartford, Connecticut in the early seventeenth century. Kirby attended Yale University but left college without a degree. He served in the cavalry during the American Revolution, seeing combat in the Battle of Bunker Hill and in the engagement at Elk River, he received seven sabre cuts on the head, and was left on the field as dead. In all, he was wounded thirteen times rising to the rank of lieutenant in a Rhode Island company. Upon his return to Litchfield, Connecticut, he married Ruth Marvin, daughter of his legal mentor.

== Career ==
Kirby practiced law in Litchfield, Connecticut and, in 1787, Yale gave him an honorary Master of Arts degree. He served in the Connecticut General Assembly from 1791 until 1801; afterwards he was director of the Western Reserve in Ohio. He was an unsuccessful candidate for governor in 1802 and 1803, and for the U.S. Senate in 1802.

In 1789 Kirby compiled the first volume of law reports in America, those of the Superior Court of Connecticut, in the Reports of Cases Adjudged in the Superior Court of the State of Connecticut, from the year 1785, to May, 1788. He was also the first General Grand High Priest of the Royal Arch Masons of the United States, 1798-1804.

President Thomas Jefferson appointed Kirby Supervisor of Internal Revenue for Connecticut, a position he held until September 1802. In April 1804, Kirby was appointed the first Superior Court Judge of the Mississippi Territory. He went directly to his new post, Fort Stoddert, on the Alabama River north of Spanish-held Mobile, near the present Mount Vernon. In this sparsely settled wilderness, he began the foundation of a new court system for what would become the State of Alabama.

He lived only a few months, dying of fever after being appointed by President Jefferson as the new Judge of the Superior Court of the Territory of Orleans. He left Ruth and eight children in Connecticut.

He died at Fort Stoddert on October 20, 1804. His death is also reported as October 2; the cause was said to be yellow fever. His grave at old Fort Stoddert has never been found. However, a visitor of 1850 reported that at the site of the old fort he found "the remains of chimneys, which were built of sand rock…I also found broken delf, and the neck of champagne bottles. In the cemetery, a little north of Fort Stoddert, on the lake, I found a red cedar board, at the head of a grave, with the name nicely cut, 'Ephraim Kirby, died Oct. 4th, 1804.'"

Judge Kirby was the grandfather of Edmund Kirby Smith, the Confederate general.

== See also ==
- List of Mississippi Territory judges

== Sources ==
- Waselkov, Gregory; Christopher, Raven (April 2012). "Archaeological Survey of the Old Federal Road in Alabama (Public Version - Site Locations Redacted)". Center for Archaeological Studies University of South Alabama.

Party political offices
| Preceded by Richard Law | Democratic-Republican nominee for Governor of Connecticut; 1802, 1803 | Succeeded by William Hart |
Political offices
| Preceded by unknown | Connecticut state representative 1791–1801 | Succeeded by unknown |
Legal offices
| Preceded by newly created position | Judge of the Superior Court of the Territory of Mississippi; 1804 | Succeeded by Harry Toulmin |
| Preceded by newly created position | Judge of the Superior Court of the Territory of Orleans; 1804 | Succeeded by George Mathews, Jr. |
