= Governor Foot =

Governor Foot or Foote may refer to:

- Henry S. Foote (1804–1880), 19th Governor of Mississippi
- Hugh Foot, Baron Caradon (1907–1990), Governor of Jamaica from 1951 to 1957, and Governor of Cyprus from 1957 to 1960
- Samuel A. Foot (1780–1846), 28th Governor of Connecticut
