= 1798 Connecticut gubernatorial election =

- November 1798
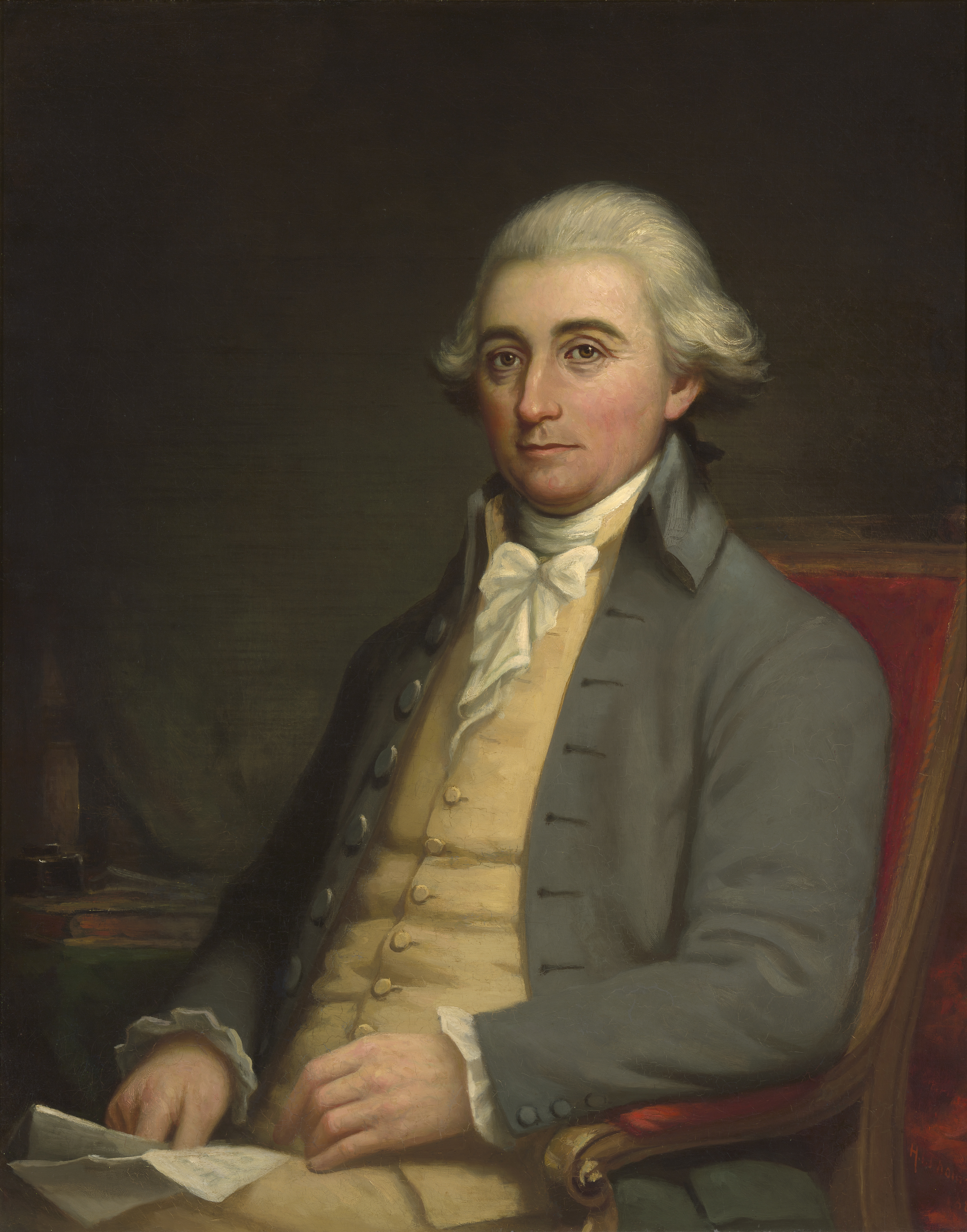
Nominee	Jonathan Trumbull Jr.
Party	Federalist
Popular vote	7,075
Percentage	100.00%
Governor before election
Jonathan Trumbull Jr.
Federalist
Elected Governor
Jonathan Trumbull Jr.
Federalist

The 1798 Connecticut gubernatorial election was held in November 1798 in order to elect the Governor of Connecticut. Incumbent Federalist Governor of Connecticut Jonathan Trumbull Jr. won the election as he ran unopposed.

== General election ==
On election day in November 1798, Federalist nominee Jonathan Trumbull Jr. easily won the election as he ran unopposed. Trumbull was sworn in for his first full term on December 2, 1798.

=== Results ===
Connecticut gubernatorial election, 1798
Party	Candidate	Votes	%
Federalist	Jonathan Trumbull Jr. (incumbent)	7,075	100.00
Total votes		7,075	100.00
Federalist hold			
