= 1806 Connecticut gubernatorial election =

- April 10, 1806
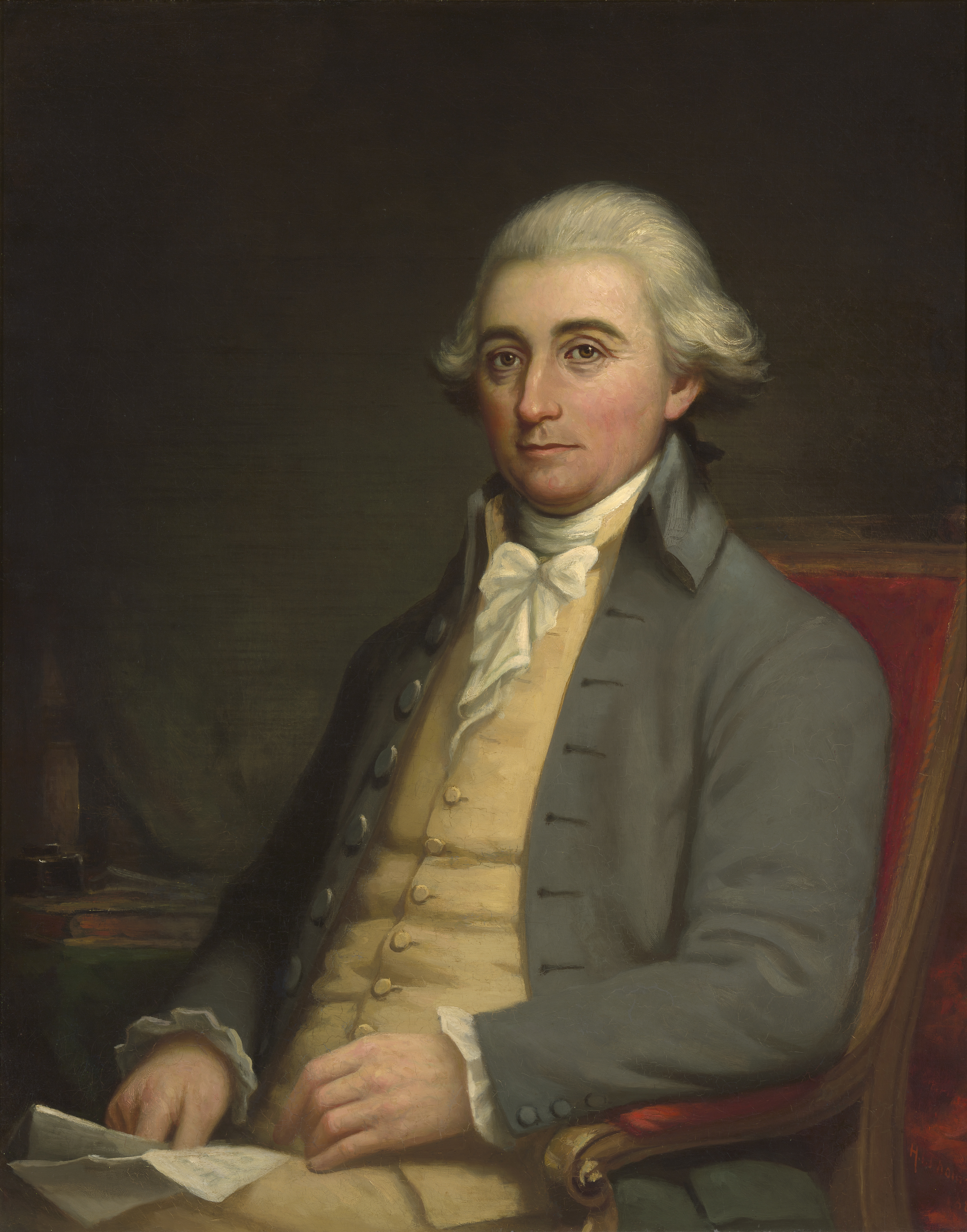

Nominee	Jonathan Trumbull Jr.	William Hart
Party	Federalist	Democratic-Republican
Popular vote	13,413	9,460
Percentage	58.27%	41.10%
- Trumbull: 50–60% 60–70% 70–80% 80–90% 90–100% Hart: 50–60% 60–70% 70–80% 80–90% No Data/Vote
Governor before election
Jonathan Trumbull Jr.
Federalist
Elected Governor
Jonathan Trumbull Jr.
Federalist

The 1806 Connecticut gubernatorial election took place on April 10, 1806. Incumbent Federalist Governor Jonathan Trumbull Jr. won re-election to a ninth full term, defeating Democratic-Republican candidate William Hart in a re-match of the previous year's election.

== Results ==
1806 Connecticut gubernatorial election (Note: Some sources record the result as Trumbull 13,586, Hart 9,589; this includes 173 votes for Trumbull and 129 for Hart rejected by the General Assembly.)
Party	Candidate	Votes	%	±%
Federalist	Jonathan Trumbull Jr. (incumbent)	13,413	58.27%	
Democratic-Republican	William Hart	9,460	41.10%	
Scattering		144	0.63%	
Majority		3,953	17.17%	
Turnout		23,017	100.00%	
Federalist hold		Swing		
