= 1801 Connecticut gubernatorial election =

- April 9, 1801
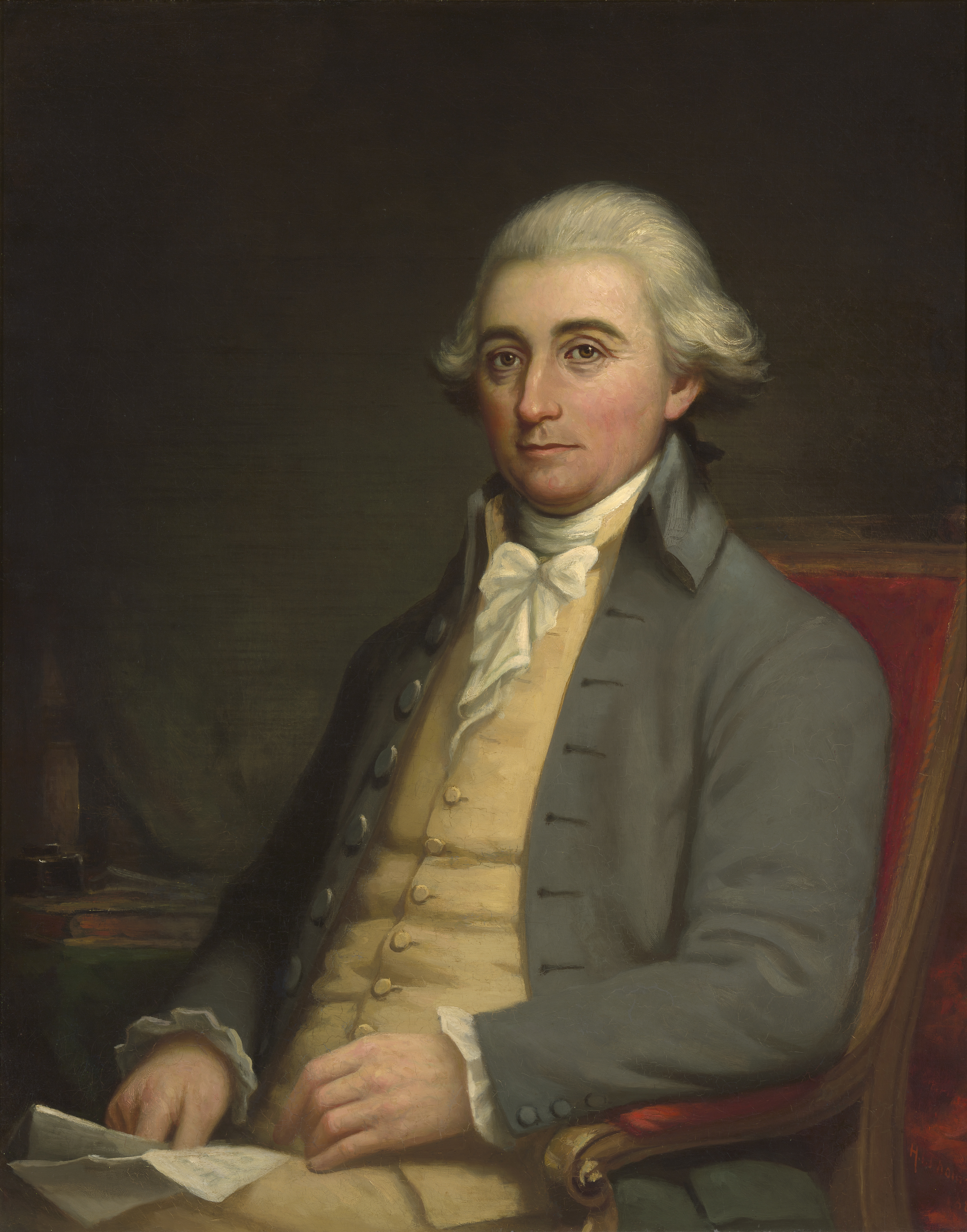

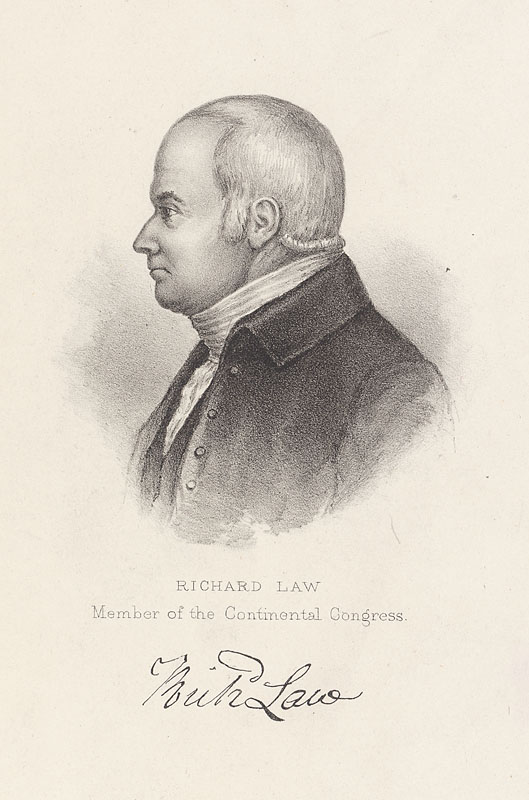
Nominee	Jonathan Trumbull Jr.	Richard Law
Party	Federalist	Democratic-Republican
Popular vote	11,156	1,056
Percentage	83.84%	7.94%
Governor before election
Jonathan Trumbull Jr.
Federalist
Elected Governor
Jonathan Trumbull Jr.
Federalist

The 1801 Connecticut gubernatorial election took place on April 9, 1801. Incumbent Federalist Governor Jonathan Trumbull Jr. won re-election to a fourth full term, defeating Democratic-Republican candidate Richard Law.

== Results ==
1801 Connecticut gubernatorial election
Party	Candidate	Votes	%	±%
Federalist	Jonathan Trumbull Jr. (incumbent)	11,156	83.84%	−16.16%
Democratic-Republican	Richard Law	1,056	7.94%	N/A
Scattering		1,095	8.23%	N/A
Majority		10,100	75.90%	−24.10%
Turnout		13,307	100.00%	
Federalist hold		Swing		
