= John Samuel Peters =

American politician (1772–1858)

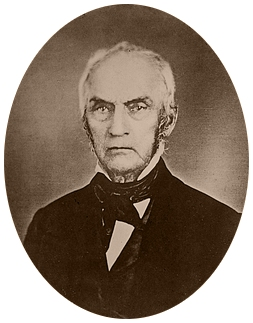

26th Governor of Connecticut
- In office March 2, 1831 – May 1, 1833
- Lieutenant: Thaddeus Betts
- Preceded by: Gideon Tomlinson
- Succeeded by: Henry W. Edwards

31st Lieutenant Governor of Connecticut
- In office May 2, 1827 – March 2, 1831
- Governor: Gideon Tomlinson
- Preceded by: David Plant
- Succeeded by: Vacant

Member of the Connecticut Senate
- In office 1818-1823

Member of the Connecticut House of Representatives
- In office 1810-1818

Personal details
- Born: September 21, 1772 Hebron, Connecticut
- Died: March 30, 1858 (aged 85) Hebron, Connecticut
- Party: National Republican (1827–1833); Whig (1839)
- Education: Yale College; Trinity College
- Profession: physician, politician

John Samuel Peters (September 21, 1772 – March 30, 1858) was an American politician, a member of the National Republican and later Whig parties, and the 26th governor of Connecticut.

== Biography ==
Peters was born in Hebron, Connecticut, on September 21, 1772, son of Beneslie and Ann Shipman Peters. He worked on a farm, attended the district schools, taught school in Hebron in 1790, studied medicine under Dr. Benjamin Rush of Marbletown, N.Y., for six months and then under Dr. Abner Mosely of Glastonbury, Conn.; in 1796 attended lectures in Philadelphia, Pa., and practised in Hebron, from 1797 to 1837. He never married.

== Career ==
Peters was town clerk for twenty years, judge of probate for the district of Hebron, and frequently a member of the state legislature. He received the votes of one branch of the state legislature in 1824, when Calvin Willey was elected. In 1810 he was elected to in the Connecticut House of Representatives and was re-elected in 1816 and 1817. He was a member of Connecticut Council of Assistants in 1818. He served in the Connecticut Senate from 1818 to 1823, and was a member of Connecticut House of Representatives from Hebron from 1824 to 1825.

Peters became the 31st Lieutenant Governor of Connecticut in 1827. He became the Governor of Connecticut in March 1831, when Governor Tomlinson resigned from office. He was nominated and elected the Governor of Connecticut later in 1831, and was re-elected to a second term in 1832. During his term, Connecticut's first railroads were authorized and private enterprise was promoted. He also advocated internal and educational improvements, but he was unsuccessful in securing the appropriate funding. He left office in 1833, after an unsuccessful re-election bid. He was a delegate to the Whig National Convention from Connecticut in 1839, and was the Convention Vice-President.

== Death and legacy ==
Peters died on March 30, 1858, at the age of 85. He is interred at St. Peter's Episcopal Cemetery, Hebron, Connecticut. His large stone monument includes a bust of the governor. He was a fellow of the Tolland County Medical society; treasurer, vice-president and president of the State Medical society, and vice president of the Connecticut Historical Society. He received the honorary degree of M.D. from Yale in 1818, and LL.D. from Trinity in 1831. He was the nephew of clergyman Samuel Peters and the cousin of Connecticut Supreme Court Justice, John Thompson Peters.

Party political offices
Preceded by Gideon Tomlinson	National Republican nominee for Governor of Connecticut; 1831, 1832, 1833	Succeeded by None
Political offices
Preceded by David Plant	Lieutenant Governor of Connecticut; 1827–1831	Succeeded by Thaddeus Betts
Preceded by Oliver Wolcott Jr.	Governor of Connecticut; 1831–1833	Succeeded by Henry W. Edwards
