= 1804 Connecticut gubernatorial election =

- April 12, 1804
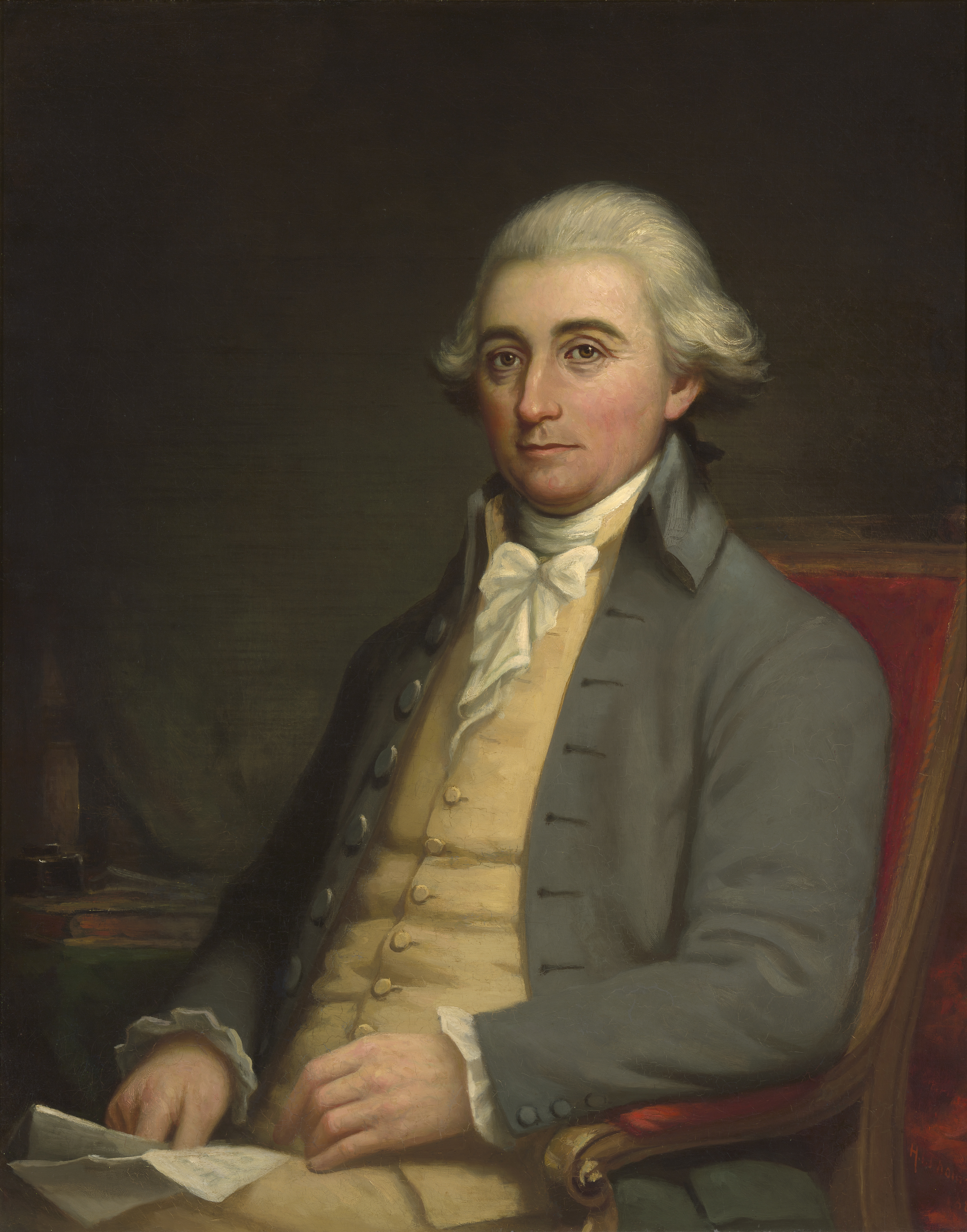

Nominee	Jonathan Trumbull Jr.	William Hart
Party	Federalist	Democratic-Republican
Popular vote	11,108	6,871
Percentage	61.23%	37.88%
- Trumbull: 50–60% 60–70% 70–80% 80–90% 90–100% Hart: 50–60% 60–70% 70–80% No Data/Vote
Governor before election
Jonathan Trumbull Jr.
Federalist
Elected Governor
Jonathan Trumbull Jr.
Federalist

The 1804 Connecticut gubernatorial election took place on April 12, 1804. Incumbent Federalist Governor Jonathan Trumbull Jr. won re-election to a seventh full term, defeating Democratic-Republican candidate William Hart.

== Results ==
1804 Connecticut gubernatorial election (Note: Some sources record the result as Trumbull 11,963, Hart 7,376; this includes 855 votes for Trumbull and 505 for Hart rejected by the General Assembly.)
Party	Candidate	Votes	%	±%
Federalist	Jonathan Trumbull Jr. (incumbent)	11,108	61.23%	
Democratic-Republican	William Hart	6,871	37.88%	
Scattering		162	0.89%	
Majority		4,237	23.35%	
Turnout		18,141	100.00%	
Federalist hold		Swing		
