= 1800 Connecticut gubernatorial election =

- April 10, 1800
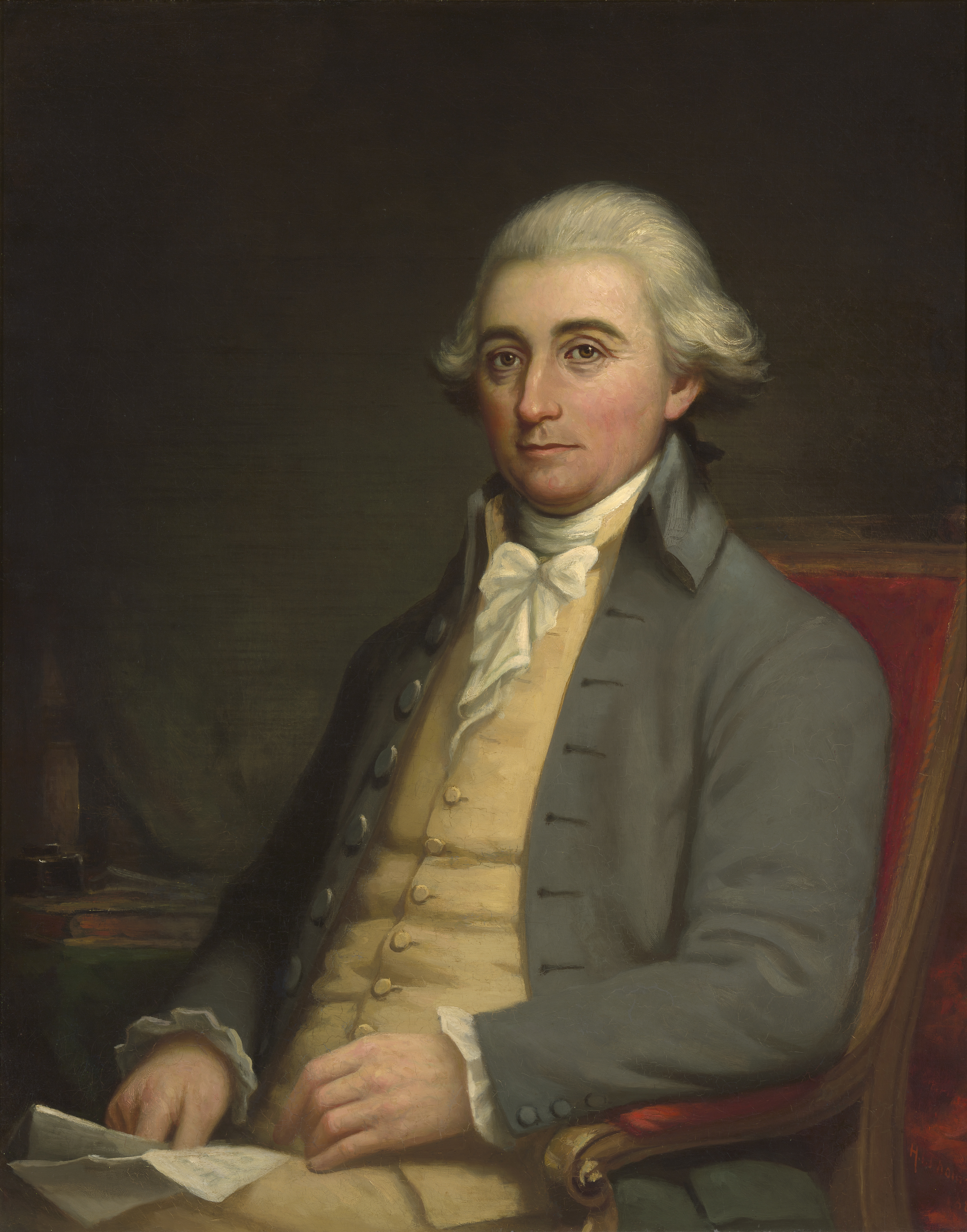
Nominee	Jonathan Trumbull Jr.
Party	Federalist
Popular vote	5,544
Percentage	100.00%
Governor before election
Jonathan Trumbull Jr.
Federalist
Elected Governor
Jonathan Trumbull Jr.
Federalist

The 1800 Connecticut gubernatorial election took place on April 10, 1800. Incumbent Federalist Governor Jonathan Trumbull Jr. won re-election to a third full term, effectively unopposed.

== Results ==
1800 Connecticut gubernatorial election
Party	Candidate	Votes	%	±%
Federalist	Jonathan Trumbull Jr. (incumbent)	5,544	100.00%	
Turnout		5,544	100.00%	
Federalist hold		Swing		
