= 1802 Connecticut gubernatorial election =

- April 8, 1802
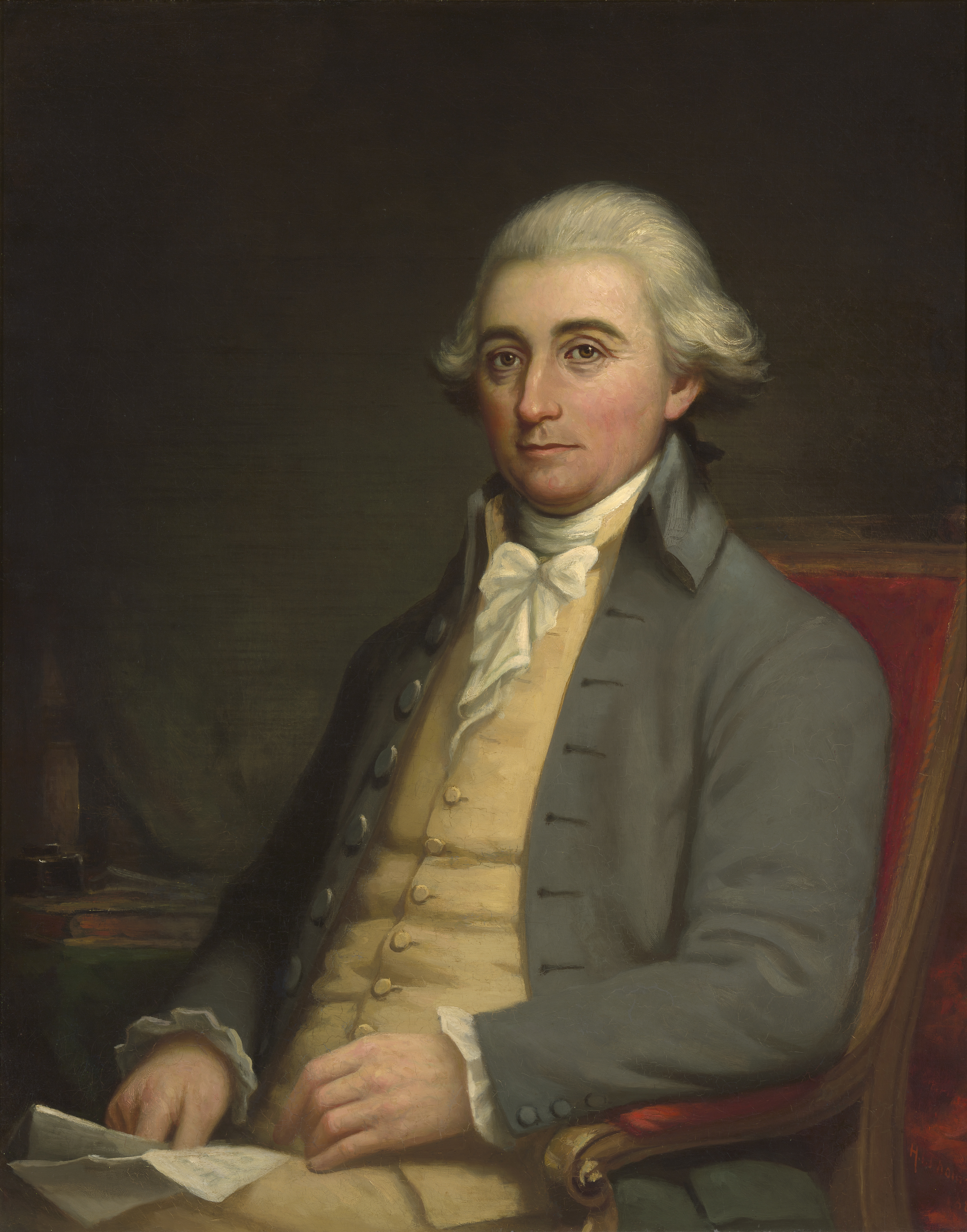

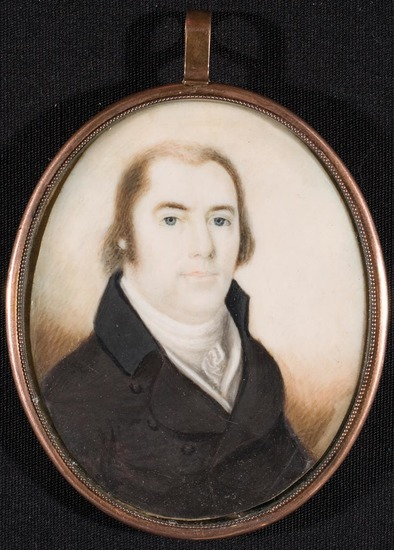
Nominee	Jonathan Trumbull Jr.	Ephraim Kirby
Party	Federalist	Democratic-Republican
Popular vote	11,398	4,523
Percentage	69.87%	27.72%
Governor before election
Jonathan Trumbull Jr.
Federalist
Elected Governor
Jonathan Trumbull Jr.
Federalist

The 1802 Connecticut gubernatorial election took place on April 8, 1802. Incumbent Federalist Governor Jonathan Trumbull Jr. won re-election to a fifth full term, defeating Democratic-Republican candidate Ephraim Kirby.

== Results ==
1802 Connecticut gubernatorial election
Party	Candidate	Votes	%	±%
Federalist	Jonathan Trumbull Jr. (incumbent)	11,398	69.87%	−13.97%
Democratic-Republican	Ephraim Kirby	4,523	27.72%	+19.78%
Scattering		393	2.41%	−5.82%
Majority		6,875	42.14%	−33.76%
Turnout		16,314	100.00%	
Federalist hold		Swing		
