= 1837 Connecticut gubernatorial election =

- April 3, 1837
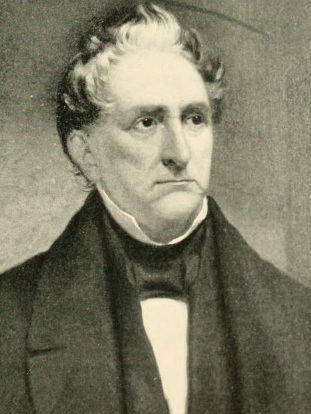

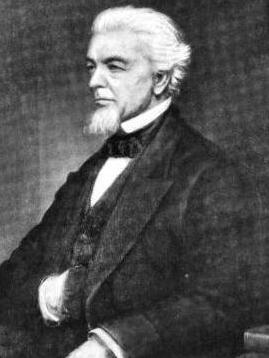
Nominee	Henry W. Edwards	William W. Ellsworth
Party	Democratic	Whig
Popular vote	23,805	21,508
Percentage	52.53%	47.47%
- Edwards: 50–60% 60–70% 70–80% 80–90% Ellsworth: 50–60% 60–70% 70–80%
Governor before election
Henry W. Edwards
Democratic
Elected Governor
Henry W. Edwards
Democratic

The 1837 Connecticut gubernatorial election was held on April 3, 1837. Incumbent governor and Democratic nominee Henry W. Edwards was re-elected, defeating former congressman and Whig nominee William W. Ellsworth with 52.53% of the vote.

== General election ==
=== Candidates ===
Major party candidates

- Henry W. Edwards, Democratic
- William W. Ellsworth, Whig

=== Results ===
1837 Connecticut gubernatorial election
Party	Candidate	Votes	%	±%
Democratic	Henry W. Edwards (incumbent)	23,805	52.53%	
Whig	William W. Ellsworth	21,508	47.47%	
Majority		2,297		
Turnout				
Democratic hold		Swing		
