= 1836 Connecticut gubernatorial election =

- April 4, 1836
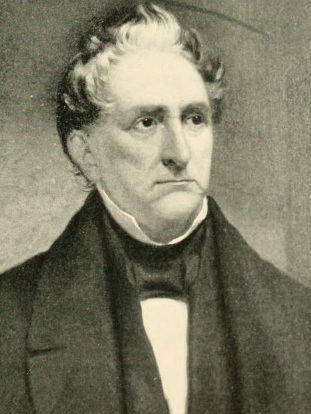

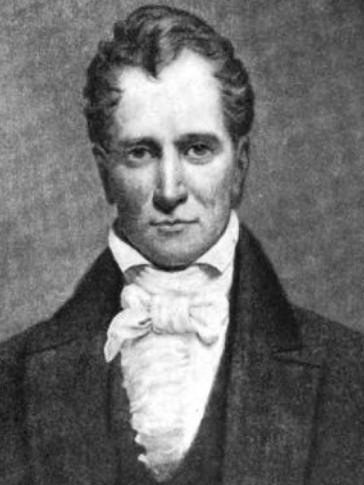
Nominee	Henry W. Edwards	Gideon Tomlinson
Party	Democratic	Whig
Popular vote	20,360	17,393
Percentage	53.93%	46.07%
- Seymour: 50–60% 60–70% 70–80% 80–90% Trumbull: 50–60% 60–70% 70–80% 80–90% Tie: 50% No Vote/Data
Governor before election
Henry W. Edwards
Democratic
Elected Governor
Henry W. Edwards
Democratic

The 1836 Connecticut gubernatorial election was held on April 4, 1836. Incumbent governor and Democratic nominee Henry W. Edwards was re-elected, defeating former governor, senator and Whig nominee Gideon Tomlinson with 53.93% of the vote.

== General election ==
=== Candidates ===
Major party candidates

- Henry W. Edwards, Democratic
- Gideon Tomlinson, Whig

=== Results ===
1836 Connecticut gubernatorial election
Party	Candidate	Votes	%	±%
Democratic	Henry W. Edwards (incumbent)	20,360	53.93%	
Whig	Gideon Tomlinson	17,393	46.07%	
Majority		2,967		
Turnout				
Democratic hold		Swing		
