= 1807 Connecticut gubernatorial election =

- April 9, 1807
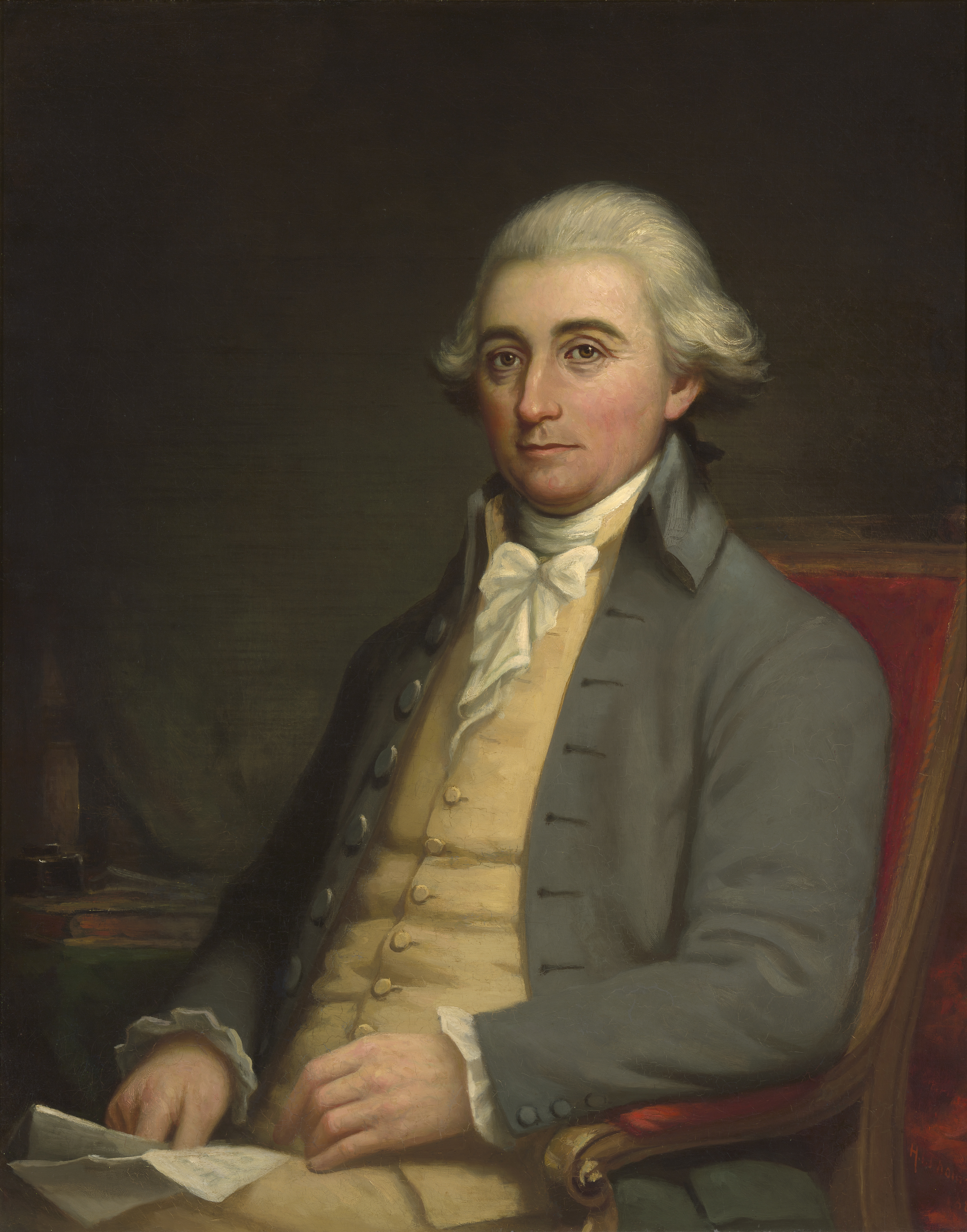

Nominee	Jonathan Trumbull Jr.	William Hart
Party	Federalist	Democratic-Republican
Popular vote	11,959	7,971
Percentage	59.72%	39.80%
- Trumbull: 50–60% 60–70% 70–80% 80–90% 90–100% Hart: 50–60% 60–70% 70–80% 80–90% No Data/Vote
Governor before election
Jonathan Trumbull Jr.
Federalist
Elected Governor
Jonathan Trumbull Jr.
Federalist

The 1807 Connecticut gubernatorial election took place on April 9, 1807. Incumbent Federalist Governor Jonathan Trumbull Jr. won re-election to a tenth full term, defeating Democratic-Republican candidate William Hart in a re-match of the previous year's election.

== Results ==
1807 Connecticut gubernatorial election
Party	Candidate	Votes	%	±%
Federalist	Jonathan Trumbull Jr. (incumbent)	11,959	59.72%	
Democratic-Republican	William Hart	7,971	39.80%	
Scattering		98	0.48%	
Majority		3,988	19.92%	
Turnout		20,026	100.00%	
Federalist hold		Swing		
