= 1832 Connecticut gubernatorial election =

- April 13, 1832
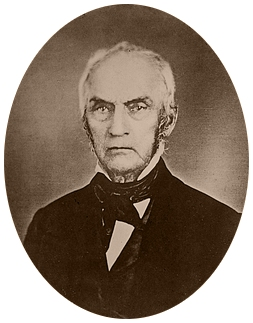

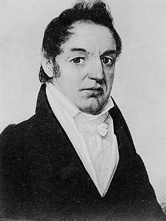
Nominee	John S. Peters	Calvin Willey
Party	National Republican	Democratic
Popular vote	11,971	4,463
Percentage	71.44%	26.63%
- Peters: 50–60% 60–70% 70–80% 80–90% 90–100% Willey: 50–60% 60–70% 90–100% Tie: 50% No Vote/Data
Governor before election
John S. Peters
National Republican
Elected Governor
John S. Peters
National Republican

The 1832 Connecticut gubernatorial election was held on April 13, 1832. Incumbent governor and National Republican nominee John S. Peters was re-elected, defeating former senator and Democratic nominee Calvin Willey with 71.44% of the vote.

The Anti-Masonic Party in Connecticut was opposed to the platform of the National Republicans, and combined its forces with the Democrats in this race, supporting a ticket of Willey for governor and John M. Holley of Salisbury for lieutenant governor. Willey had previously been affiliated with the Anti-Jacksonians during his term in the United States Senate.

This was the last time the National Republican Party would win a Connecticut gubernatorial election.

== General election ==
=== Candidates ===
Major party candidates

- John S. Peters, National Republican
- Calvin Willey, Democratic & Anti-Masonic

=== Results ===
1832 Connecticut gubernatorial election
Party	Candidate	Votes	%	±%
National Republican	John S. Peters (incumbent)	11,971	71.44%	
Democratic	Calvin Willey	4,463	26.63%	
Other	Others	324	1.93%	
Majority		7,508		
Turnout				
National Republican hold		Swing		
