= 1833 Connecticut gubernatorial election =

- April 1, 1833
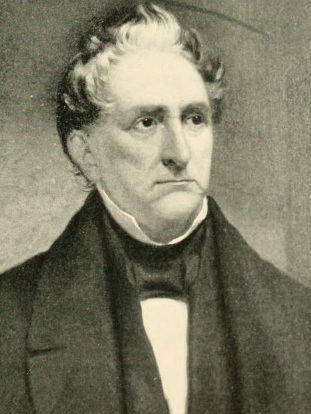

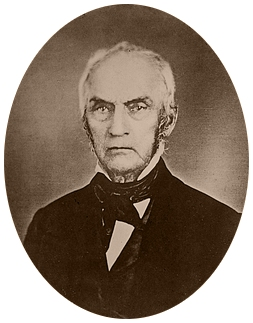

Nominee	Henry W. Edwards	John S. Peters	Zalmon Storrs
Party	Democratic	National Republican	Anti-Masonic
Popular vote	9,030	9,212	3,250
Percentage	41.31%	42.14%	14.87%
- Edwards: 30–40% 40–50% 50–60% 60–70% 70–80% 90–100% Peters: 50–60% 60–70% 70–80% 80–90% 90–100% Storrs: 40–50% 50–60% 60–70% 70–80% Tie: 50% No Data/Vote
Governor before election
John S. Peters
National Republican
Elected Governor
Henry W. Edwards
Democratic

The 1833 Connecticut gubernatorial election was held on April 1, 1833. Former senator and Democratic nominee Henry W. Edwards was elected, defeating incumbent governor and National Republican nominee John S. Peters with 41.31% of the vote.

Peters won a plurality of the vote, but did not win a majority. The state constitution required in that case, the Connecticut General Assembly would elect the governor. Edwards won the vote in the state legislature and was elected governor.

This was the last appearance of the National Republican Party in a Connecticut gubernatorial election.

== General election ==
=== Candidates ===
Major party candidates

- Henry W. Edwards, Democratic
- John S. Peters, National Republican

Minor party candidates

- Zalmon Storrs, Anti-Masonic

=== Results ===
1833 Connecticut gubernatorial election
Party	Candidate	Votes	%	±%
National Republican	John S. Peters (incumbent)	9,212	42.14%	
Democratic	Henry W. Edwards	9,030	41.31%	
Anti-Masonic	Zalmon Storrs	3,250	14.87%	
Other	Others	367	1.68%	
Plurality		182		
Turnout				
Democratic gain from National Republican		Swing		
