= 1808 Connecticut gubernatorial election =

- April 14, 1808
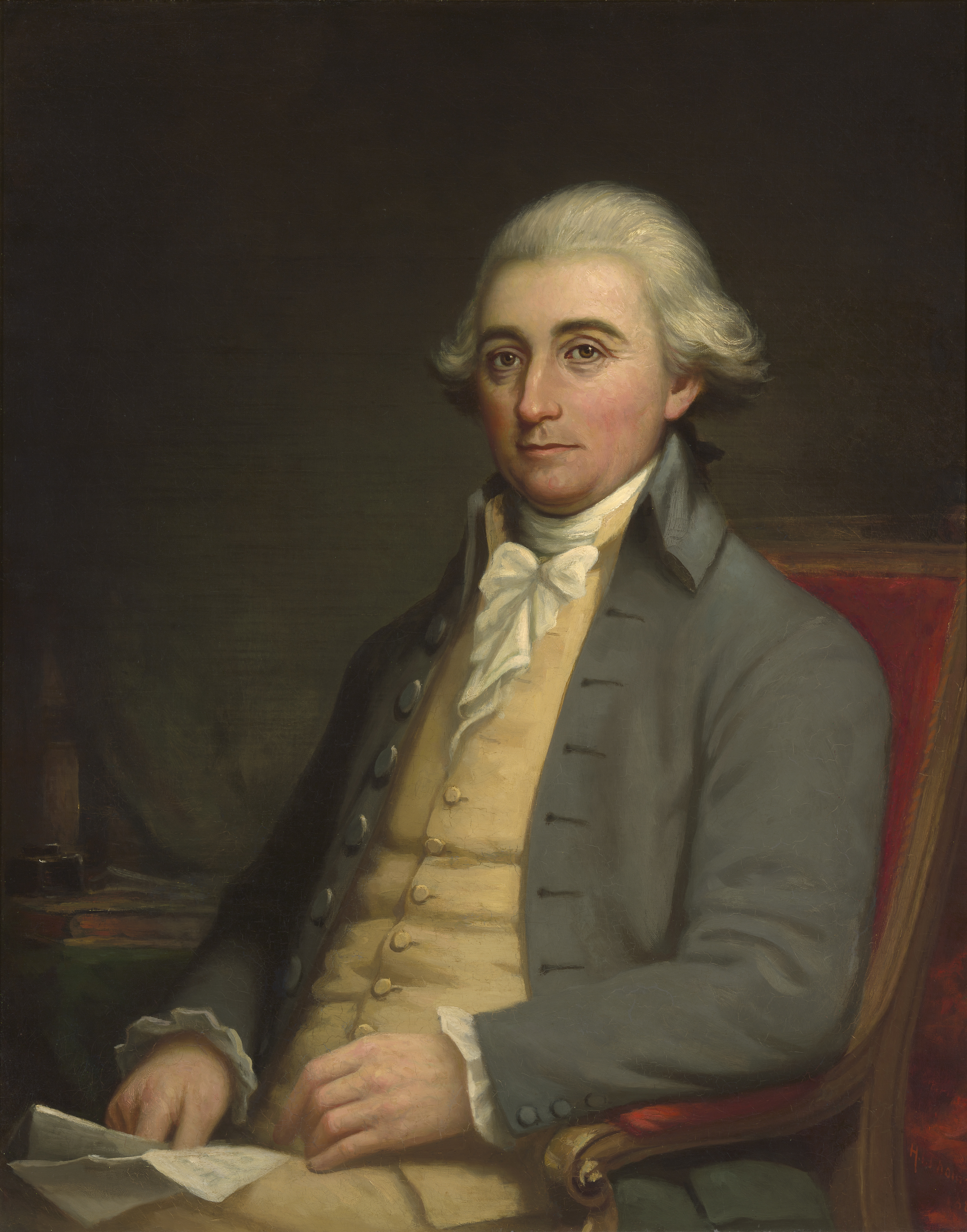

Nominee	Jonathan Trumbull Jr.	William Hart
Party	Federalist	Democratic-Republican
Popular vote	12,146	7,566
Percentage	60.85%	37.91%
- County results Trumbull: 50–60% 60–70% 70–80%
Governor before election
Jonathan Trumbull Jr.
Federalist
Elected Governor
Jonathan Trumbull Jr.
Federalist

The 1808 Connecticut gubernatorial election took place on April 14, 1808. Incumbent Federalist Governor Jonathan Trumbull Jr. won re-election to an eleventh full term, defeating Democratic-Republican candidate William Hart in a re-match of the previous year's election.

== Results ==
1808 Connecticut gubernatorial election (Note: Some sources record the result as Trumbull 13,292, Hart 8,164; this includes 1,146 votes for Trumbull and 598 for Hart rejected by the General Assembly.)
Party	Candidate	Votes	%	±%
Federalist	Jonathan Trumbull Jr. (incumbent)	12,146	60.85%	
Democratic-Republican	William Hart	7,566	37.91%	
Scattering		247	1.24%	
Majority		4,580	22.94%	
Turnout		19,959	100.00%	
Federalist hold		Swing		
