= Daniel Burrows =

American politician (1766–1858)

Member of the U.S. House of Representatives from Connecticut's at-large district
- In office March 4, 1821 – March 4, 1823
- Preceded by: Samuel A. Foot
- Succeeded by: Samuel A. Foot

Personal details
- Born: September 26, 1766 Fort Hill, Connecticut
- Died: January 23, 1858 (aged 91) Mystic, Connecticut
- Party: Democratic-Republican

Daniel Burrows (October 26, 1766 – January 23, 1858) was a United States representative from Connecticut. He was the uncle of Lorenzo Burrows who was a United States representative from New York.

He was born at Fort Hill, Connecticut where he pursued preparatory studies. He engaged in the manufacture of carriages and wagons (also known as a wainwright) at New London. Later, he studied theology and was ordained as a minister of the Methodist Church.

Burrows was a member of the Connecticut House of Representatives 1816–1820 and in 1826 and served as a delegate to the Connecticut constitutional convention in 1818. He was one of the commissioners to establish the boundary line between the States of Connecticut and Massachusetts. He was elected as a Democratic-Republican to the Seventeenth Congress (March 4, 1821 – March 3, 1823) but was not a candidate for renomination in 1822. After leaving Congress, he became a resident of Middletown 1823–1854. He was a surveyor and inspector of customs for the port of Middletown 1823–1847. He died in Mystic in 1858 and was buried in Elm Grove Cemetery.

U.S. House of Representatives
Preceded by Samuel A. Foot	Member of the U.S. House of Representatives from Connecticut's at-large congressional district 1821–1823	Succeeded by Samuel A. Foot
