= 1803 Connecticut gubernatorial election =

- April 14, 1803
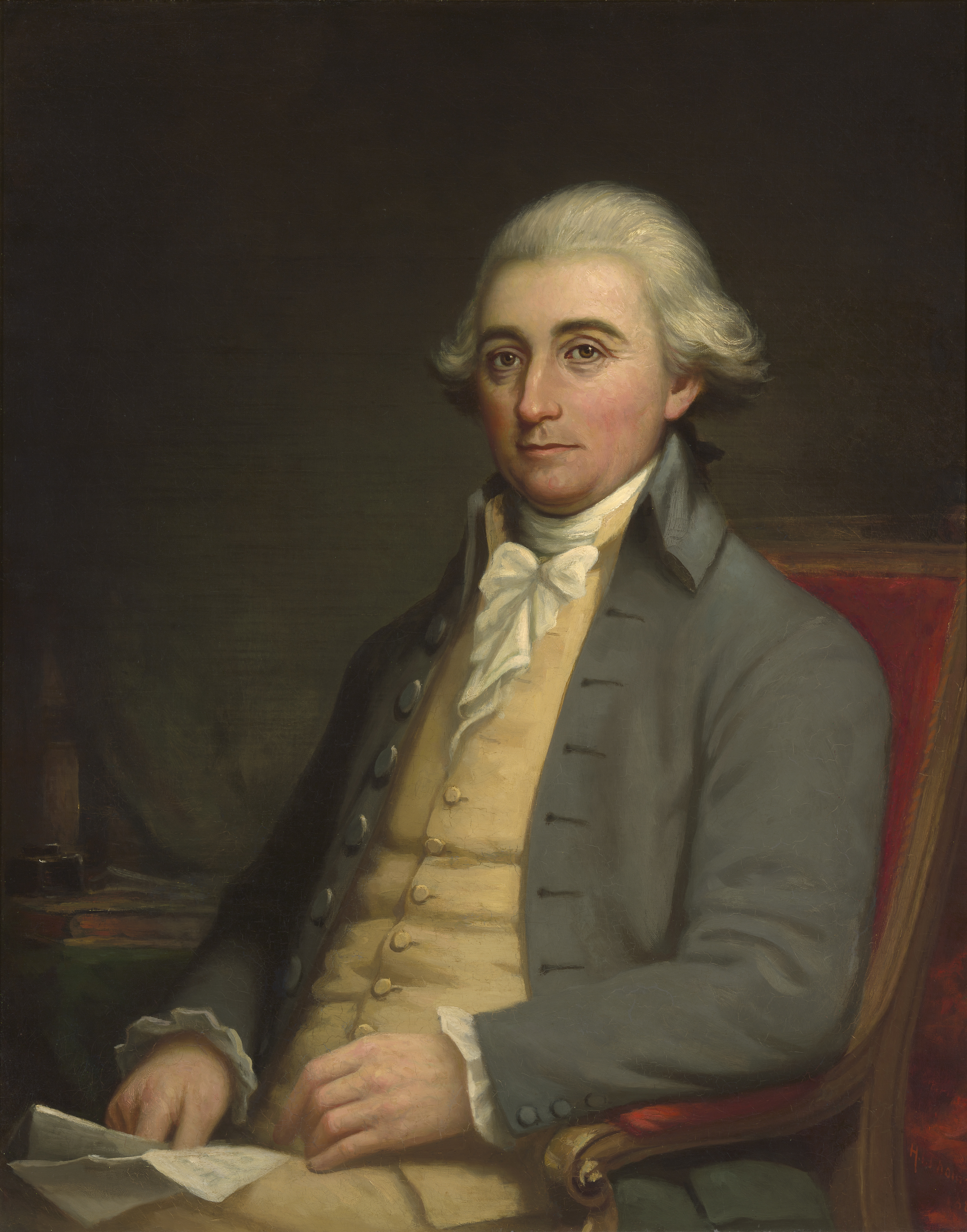

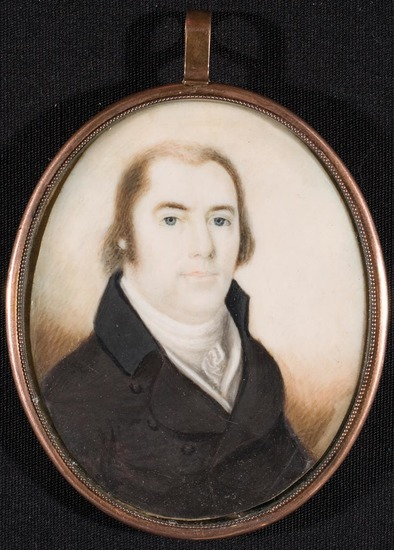
Nominee	Jonathan Trumbull Jr.	Ephraim Kirby
Party	Federalist	Democratic-Republican
Popular vote	14,375	7,848
Percentage	64.04%	34.96%
- County results Trumbull: 50–60% 60–70% 70–80% 80–90% No Data/Vote
Governor before election
Jonathan Trumbull Jr.
Federalist
Elected Governor
Jonathan Trumbull Jr.
Federalist

The 1803 Connecticut gubernatorial election took place on April 14, 1803. Incumbent Federalist Governor Jonathan Trumbull Jr. won re-election to a sixth full term, defeating Democratic-Republican candidate Ephraim Kirby in a re-match of the previous year's election.

== Results ==
1803 Connecticut gubernatorial election
Party	Candidate	Votes	%	±%
Federalist	Jonathan Trumbull Jr. (incumbent)	14,375	64.04%	
Democratic-Republican	Ephraim Kirby	7,848	34.96%	
Scattering		223	0.99%	
Majority		6,527	29.08%	
Turnout		22,446	100.00%	
Federalist hold		Swing		
