= 1805 Connecticut gubernatorial election =

- April 11, 1805
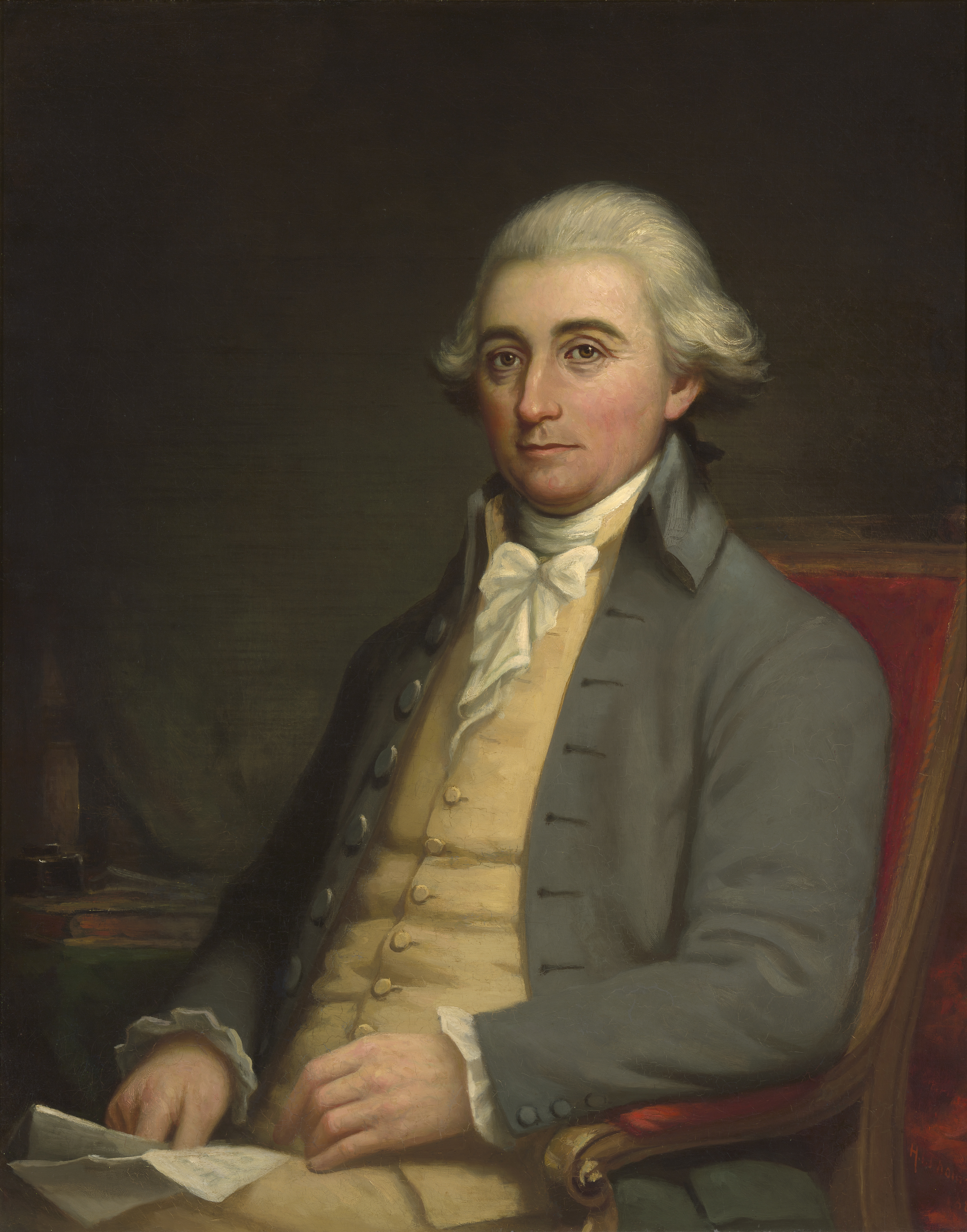

Nominee	Jonathan Trumbull Jr.	William Hart
Party	Federalist	Democratic-Republican
Popular vote	12,700	7,810
Percentage	61.47%	37.80%
- Municipal results Trumbull: 50–60% 60–70% 70–80% 80–90% 90–100% Hart: 50–60% 60–70% 70–80% 80–90% Data Missing
Governor before election
Jonathan Trumbull Jr.
Federalist
Elected Governor
Jonathan Trumbull Jr.
Federalist

The 1805 Connecticut gubernatorial election took place on April 11, 1805. Incumbent Federalist Governor Jonathan Trumbull Jr. won re-election to an eighth full term, defeating Democratic-Republican candidate William Hart in a re-match of the previous year's election.

== Results ==
1805 Connecticut gubernatorial election (Note: Some sources record the result as Trumbull 13,689, Hart 8,223; this includes 989 votes for Trumbull and 413 for Hart rejected by the General Assembly.)
Party	Candidate	Votes	%	±%
Federalist	Jonathan Trumbull Jr. (incumbent)	12,700	61.47%	
Democratic-Republican	William Hart	7,810	37.80%	
Scattering		151	0.73%	
Majority		4,890	23.67%	
Turnout		20,661	100.00%	
Federalist hold		Swing		
