= 1809 Connecticut gubernatorial election =

- April 10, 1809
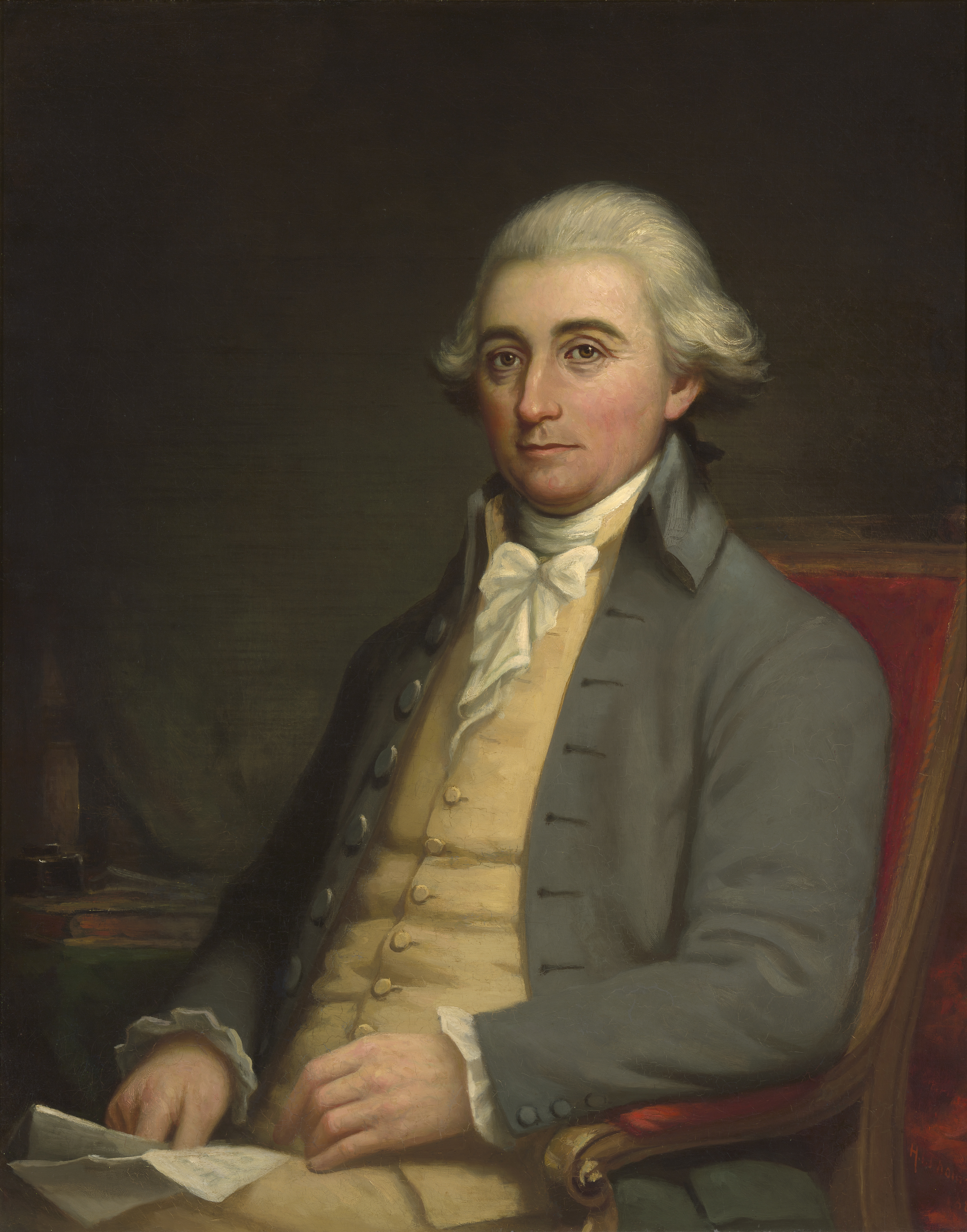

Nominee	Jonathan Trumbull Jr.	Asa Spalding
Party	Federalist	Democratic-Republican
Popular vote	14,650	8,159
Percentage	63.81%	35.54%
- Trumbull: 50–60% 60–70% 70–80% 80–90% 90–100% Spalding: 50–60% 60–70% 70–80% No Data/Vote
Governor before election
Jonathan Trumbull Jr.
Federalist
Elected Governor
Jonathan Trumbull Jr.
Federalist

The 1809 Connecticut gubernatorial election took place on April 10, 1809.

Incumbent Federalist Governor Jonathan Trumbull Jr. won re-election to a twelfth term, defeating Democratic-Republican nominee Asa Spalding with 63.81% of the vote.

== General election ==
=== Candidates ===
- Asa Spalding, Democratic-Republican, attorney, Democratic-Republican nominee for Lieutenant Governor in 1804, 1805, 1806, 1807 and 1808, Democratic-Republican nominee for U.S. Senate in 1807 special election
- Jonathan Trumbull Jr., Federalist, incumbent Governor

=== Results ===
1809 Connecticut gubernatorial election (Note: All 20th Century sources give Spalding's total as 8,159. Two newspapers from 1809 give Spalding's total as 8,150.)
Party	Candidate	Votes	%	±%
Federalist	Jonathan Trumbull Jr. (incumbent)	14,650	63.81%	
Democratic-Republican	Asa Spalding	8,159	35.54%	
Scattering		149	0.65%	
Majority		6,491	28.27%	
Turnout		22,958		
Federalist hold		Swing		
