= 1834 Connecticut gubernatorial election =

- April 7, 1834
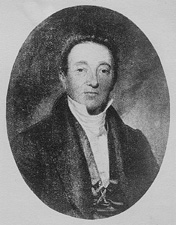

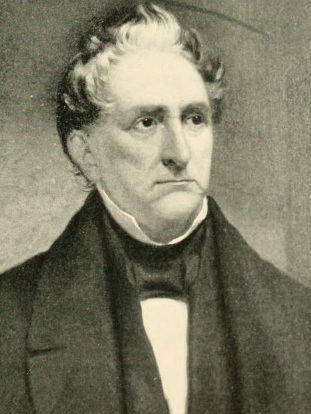

Nominee	Samuel A. Foot	Henry W. Edwards	Zalmon Storrs
Party	Whig	Democratic	Anti-Masonic
Electoral vote	154	70
Popular vote	18,411	15,834	2,398
Percentage	49.83%	42.86%	6.49%
- Foot: 40–50% 50–60% 60–70% 70–80% 80–90% 90–100% Edwards: 30–40% 40–50% 50–60% 60–70% 70–80% Storrs: 40–50% 50–60% No Vote/Data
Governor before election
Henry W. Edwards
Democratic
Elected Governor
Samuel A. Foot
Whig

The 1834 Connecticut gubernatorial election was held on April 7, 1834. Former senator and Whig nominee Samuel A. Foot was elected, defeating incumbent governor and Democratic nominee Henry W. Edwards with 49.83% of the vote.

Foot won a plurality of the vote, but fell just short of a majority, by 63 votes. The state constitution required in that case, the Connecticut General Assembly would elect the governor. Foot won the vote in the state legislature, 154 to 70, and was elected governor.

This was the first appearance of the Whig Party, also known as the "Young Men's Party", in a Connecticut gubernatorial election.

== General election ==
=== Candidates ===
Major party candidates

- Samuel A. Foot, Whig (sometimes listed as Young Men's)
- Henry W. Edwards, Democratic

Minor party candidates

- Zalmon Storrs, Anti-Masonic

=== Results ===
1834 Connecticut gubernatorial election
Party	Candidate	Votes	%	±%
Whig	Samuel A. Foot	18,411	49.83%	
Democratic	Henry W. Edwards (incumbent)	15,834	42.86%	
Anti-Masonic	Zalmon Storrs	2,398	6.49%	
Other	Others	305	0.83%	
Plurality		2,577		
Turnout				

1834 Connecticut gubernatorial election, contingent General Assembly election
Party	Candidate	Votes	%	±%
Whig	Samuel A. Foot	154	68.75%	
Democratic	Henry W. Edwards (incumbent)	70	31.25%	
Majority		84		
Whig gain from Democratic		Swing		
