= Henry W. Edwards =

American politician (1779–1847)

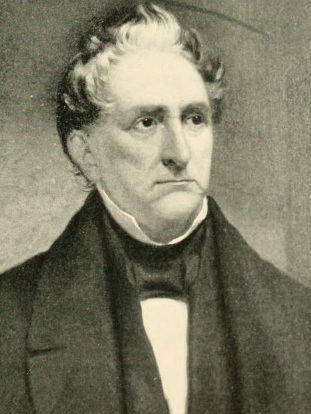

27th & 29th Governor of Connecticut
- In office May 1, 1833 – May 7, 1834
- Lieutenant: Ebenezer Stoddard
- Preceded by: John S. Peters
- Succeeded by: Samuel A. Foot
- In office May 6, 1835 – May 2, 1838
- Lieutenant: Ebenezer Stoddard
- Preceded by: Samuel A. Foot
- Succeeded by: William W. Ellsworth

United States Senator from Connecticut
- In office October 8, 1823 – March 3, 1827
- Preceded by: Elijah Boardman
- Succeeded by: Samuel A. Foot

Member of the U.S. House of Representatives from Connecticut's at-large district
- In office March 4, 1819 – October 8, 1823
- Preceded by: Sylvester Gilbert
- Succeeded by: Noyes Barber

Member of the Connecticut Senate
- In office 1828-1829

Personal details
- Born: Henry Waggaman Edwards; October 1779 New Haven, Connecticut
- Died: July 22, 1847 (aged 67) New Haven, Connecticut
- Resting place: Grove Street Cemetery, New Haven, New Haven County, Connecticut
- Party: Democratic
- Spouse: Lydia Miller
- Education: Princeton, Litchfield Law School
- Profession: lawyer, politician

Henry Waggaman Edwards (October 1779 – July 22, 1847) was an American lawyer, a Democrat, and the 27th and 29th governor of the U.S. state of Connecticut (1833–1834, 1835–1838). He previously served in both the U.S. Senate (1823 to 1827) and the U.S. House of Representatives (1819 to 1823). He was a cousin to Aaron Burr (1756–1836), the third vice president of the United States.

== Biography ==
Edwards was born in New Haven, Connecticut, the son of Judge Pierpont Edwards and Frances Ogden. He graduated from Princeton University in 1797, and earned a law degree from the Litchfield Law School. He married Lydia Miller on October 4, 1801, and they had seven children.

== Career ==
Edwards became a lawyer, was active in Democratic politics, and was the United States representative from Connecticut at-large from 1819 to 1823.

=== U.S. Senator ===
He was appointed to fill the vacancy caused by the death of Elijah Boardman as a United States Senator and served from Connecticut from 1823 to 1827.

=== Other offices ===
He served as a member of Connecticut Senate at-large from 1828 to 1829. member of Connecticut state house of representatives from New Haven, in 1830, and the Speaker of the Connecticut House of Representatives in 1830. He was elected Lieutenant Governor of Connecticut in 1832, but was deprived of the office by a divided Assembly.

=== Governor ===
Elected in 1833, Edwards served as Governor of Connecticut from May 1, 1833, to May 7, 1834. Unsuccessful in his bid for the office in 1834, he was returned to office in 1835 and re-elected two more times, serving again from May 6, 1835, to May 2, 1838. During his tenure, a discriminatory education law was enacted, the railroad expanded, and the state funded a geological survey in 1835.

=== Later years ===
When he did not win the Democratic party's nomination in 1838, he retired from public service.

=== Death ===
Edwards died on July 22, 1847, in New Haven, Connecticut, and is interred at Grove Street Cemetery, New Haven, New Haven County, Connecticut.

Party political offices
Preceded by Calvin Willey	Democratic nominee for Governor of Connecticut; 1833, 1834, 1835, 1836, 1837	Succeeded by Seth P. Beers
U.S. House of Representatives
Preceded by Sylvester Gilbert	U.S. Representative from Connecticut (at large); March 4, 1819 – October 8, 1823	Succeeded by Noyes Barber
U.S. Senate
Preceded by Elijah Boardman	U.S. Senator from Connecticut (class 1); October 8, 1823 – March 3, 1827	Succeeded by Samuel A. Foot
Political offices
Preceded by John S. Peters	Governor of Connecticut; 1833–1834	Succeeded by Samuel A. Foot
Preceded by Samuel A. Foot	Governor of Connecticut; 1835–1838	Succeeded by William W. Ellsworth
