= Samuel A. Foot =

American politician (1780–1846)

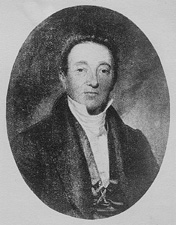

28th Governor of Connecticut
- In office May 7, 1834 – May 6, 1835
- Lieutenant: Thaddeus Betts
- Preceded by: Henry W. Edwards
- Succeeded by: Henry W. Edwards

Member of the U.S. House of Representatives from Connecticut's at-large district
- In office March 4, 1833 – May 9, 1834
- Preceded by: Ralph I. Ingersoll
- Succeeded by: Ebenezer Jackson, Jr.

United States Senator from Connecticut
- In office March 4, 1827 – March 3, 1833
- Preceded by: Henry W. Edwards
- Succeeded by: Nathan Smith

Member of the U.S. House of Representatives from Connecticut's at-large district
- In office March 4, 1823 – March 3, 1825
- Preceded by: Daniel Burrows
- Succeeded by: Ralph I. Ingersoll

Member of the U.S. House of Representatives from Connecticut's at-large district
- In office March 4, 1819 – March 3, 1821
- Preceded by: Sylvester Gilbert
- Succeeded by: Daniel Burrows

5th Speaker of the Connecticut House of Representatives
- In office 1825–1826
- Preceded by: Ralph I. Ingersoll
- Succeeded by: Ebenezer Young

Member of the Connecticut House of Representatives
- In office 1817-1818; 1821-1823; 1825-1826

Personal details
- Born: Samuel Augustus Foot; November 8, 1780 Cheshire, Connecticut, US
- Died: September 15, 1846 (aged 65) Cheshire, Connecticut, US
- Party: National Republican (1824–1834); Whig (1834–1846)
- Spouse: Eudocia Hull Foot
- Children: Andrew Hull Foote
- Education: Yale College; Litchfield Law School
- Profession: farmer, politician

Samuel Augustus Foot (November 8, 1780 – September 15, 1846; his surname is also spelled Foote) was the 28th governor of Connecticut as well as a United States representative and senator.

== Biography ==
Born November 8, 1780 in Cheshire, Connecticut, to John and Abigail (née Hall) Foot. Having entered Yale College at the age of thirteen, Foot was the youngest student in the graduating class of 1797. He attended Litchfield Law School when he was seventeen, but discontinued law studies due to ill health. He then moved to New Haven, Connecticut; became a West India Trader and made many voyages for his health. He married Eudocia Hull in 1803 and they had seven children (the second of whom was Andrew Hull Foote).

== Career ==
When the War of 1812 Embargo Act ruined his business, Foot returned to his father's farm in Cheshire in 1813, engaged in agricultural pursuits and politics.

Foot was a member of the Connecticut House of Representatives in 1817 and 1818, and was elected to the Sixteenth Congress, serving from March 4, 1819 to March 3, 1821. He was again a member of the State house of representatives from 1821 to 1823 and 1825 to 1826, serving as speaker in 1825 to 1826; he was elected to the Eighteenth Congress, serving from March 4, 1823 to March 3, 1825. He was elected by the General Assembly to the U.S. Senate as an Adams man (later Anti-Jacksonian) within the splintering Democratic Republican Party. He served in the Senate from March 4, 1827 to March 3, 1833. In the Senate he is most noted for the "Foot Resolution" of December 29, 1829 to limit the sale of public lands. It was during debate on this resolution that Daniel Webster gave his "Liberty and Union, one and inseparable, now and forever" speech.

Foot was an unsuccessful candidate for reelection in 1832; while in the United States Congress, he was chairman of the Committee on Pensions (Twenty-first and Twenty-second Congresses). He was elected to the Twenty-third Congress, and served from March 4, 1833, to May 9, 1834, when he resigned to become Governor of Connecticut, a position he held in 1834 and 1835. He was an unsuccessful Whig candidate for re-election in 1835. Foot later served as a presidential elector on the Clay-Frelinghuysen ticket in 1844.

== Death ==
Foot died in Cheshire on September 15, 1846. He is interred at Hillside Cemetery, Cheshire, Connecticut.

Party political offices
First	Whig nominee for Governor of Connecticut; 1834, 1835	Succeeded by William W. Ellsworth
U.S. Senate
Preceded by Henry W. Edwards	U.S. senator (Class 1) from Connecticut; March 4, 1827 – March 3, 1833; Served alongside: Calvin Willey, Gideon Tomlinson	Succeeded by Nathan Smith
U.S. House of Representatives
Preceded by Sylvester Gilbert	Member of the U.S. House of Representatives from Connecticut's at-large congressional district March 4, 1819 – March 3, 1821	Succeeded by Daniel Burrows
Preceded by Daniel Burrows	Member of the U.S. House of Representatives from Connecticut's at-large congressional district March 4, 1823 – March 3, 1825	Succeeded by Ralph I. Ingersoll
Preceded by Ralph I. Ingersoll	Member of the U.S. House of Representatives from Connecticut's at-large congressional district March 4, 1833 – May 9, 1834	Succeeded by Ebenezer Jackson Jr.
Political offices
Preceded by Henry W. Edwards	Governor of Connecticut; May 7, 1834 – May 6, 1835	Succeeded by Henry W. Edwards
