= List of governors of Connecticut =

Governor of Connecticut
- Seal of the governor

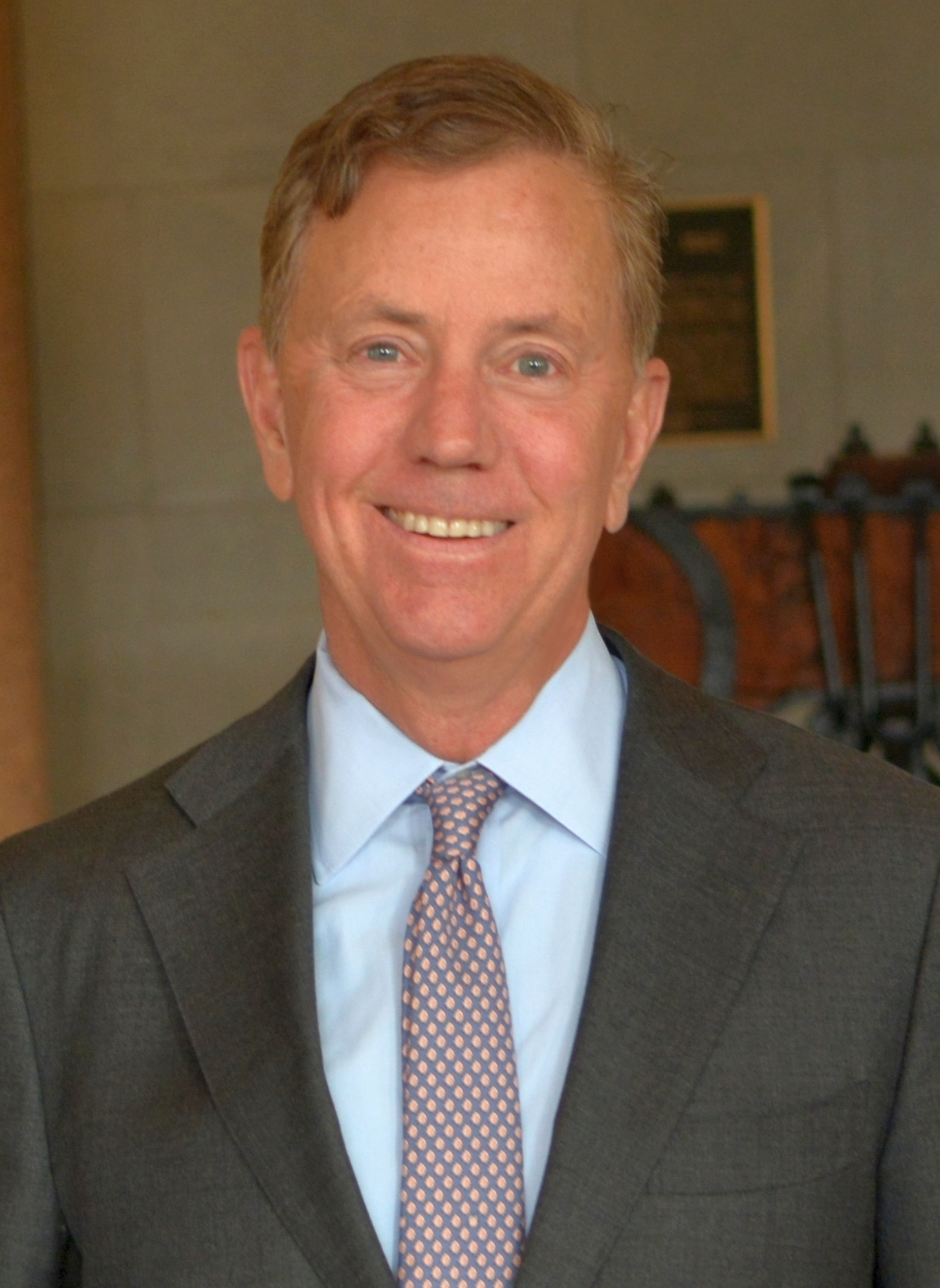
- Incumbent; Ned Lamont since January 9, 2019
- Government of Connecticut
- Style: Governor (informally); His Excellency (formal)
- Type: Head of state Head of government
- Member of: Cabinet
- Residence: Governor's Residence
- Seat: Connecticut State Capitol, Hartford, Connecticut
- Nominator: Political parties
- Appointer: Popular vote
- Term length: Four years, no limit
- Constituting instrument: Constitution of Connecticut
- Precursor: Governor of Saybrook (merged with Connecticut, 1644); Governor of New Haven (merged with Connecticut, 1665)
- Formation: 1639; 387 years ago
- Succession: Line of succession
- Deputy: Lieutenant Governor of Connecticut
- Salary: $226,711
- Website: Office of the Governor

The governor of Connecticut is the head of government of Connecticut, and the commander-in-chief of the state's military forces. The governor has a duty to enforce state laws, and the power to either approve or veto bills passed by the Connecticut General Assembly and to convene the legislature. Unusual among governors, the governor of Connecticut has no power to pardon. The governor of Connecticut is automatically a member of the state's Bonding Commission. He is an ex-officio member of the board of trustees of the University of Connecticut and Yale University.

There have been 69 post-Revolution governors of the state, serving 73 distinct spans in office. Four have served non-consecutive terms: Henry W. Edwards, James E. English, Marshall Jewell, and Raymond E. Baldwin. The longest terms in office were in the state's early years, when four governors were elected to nine or more one-year terms. The longest was that of the first governor, Jonathan Trumbull, who served over 14 years, but 7 of those as colonial governor; the longest-serving state governor — with no other position included in the term — was his son, Jonathan Trumbull Jr., who served over 11 years. The shortest term was that of Hiram Bingham III, who served only one day before resigning to take an elected seat in the United States Senate. Additionally, Lowell Weicker is noted for a rare third party win in American politics, having been elected to a term in 1990 representing A Connecticut Party.

The current governor is Ned Lamont, a Democrat who took office on January 9, 2019.

== Governors ==
Connecticut was one of the original Thirteen Colonies and was admitted as a state on January 9, 1788. Before it declared its independence, Connecticut was a colony of the Kingdom of Great Britain.

Connecticut did not create a state constitution for itself until several decades after it became a state; until 1818, the state operated under the provisions of its colonial charter. The charter called for the election of a governor every year, with the term commencing on the second Thursday in May.

The current Constitution of Connecticut, ratified in 1965, calls for a four-year term for the governor, commencing on the Wednesday after the first Monday in the January following an election. The previous constitution of 1818 originally had only a one-year term for governor; this was increased to two years in 1875, and four years in 1948. The 1875 amendment also set the start date of the term to its current date; before then, it was the first Wednesday in the May following an election. The constitution provides for the election of a lieutenant governor for the same term as the governor. The two offices are elected on the same ticket; this provision was added in 1962. In the event of a vacancy in the office of governor, the lieutenant governor becomes governor. Before the adoption of the 1965 constitution, the lieutenant governor only acted as governor. There is no limit of any kind on the number of terms one may serve.

Governors of the State of Connecticut
No. (Note: According to the Connecticut State Library, the official listing goes back to the first governor of Connecticut Colony in 1639, and did not include repeat governors serving non-consecutive terms in the colonial period; this makes Trumbull the 16th governor. The official numbering since statehood includes repeat and acting governors.)	Governor	Term in office	Party	Election	Lt. Governor (Note: The office of Lieutenant Governor was known as Deputy-Governor under the colonial charter, but the name 'Lieutenant Governor' was predominantly used after independence.) (Note: Lieutenant governors represented the same party as their governor unless noted.)
16	Jonathan Trumbull (1710–1785)	October 13, 1769 – May 13, 1784 (5327 days; retired)	No parties (Note: Elections were non-partisan until the 1790s.)	1776 (Note: The Connecticut General Assembly approved the United States Declaration of Independence on October 10, 1776, and resolved that the state's government would continue as established under the charter; thus, colonial governor Jonathan Trumbull became state governor, serving roughly 14 years total.)	Matthew Griswold
16	Jonathan Trumbull (1710–1785)	October 13, 1769 – May 13, 1784 (5327 days; retired)	No parties	1777	Matthew Griswold
16	Jonathan Trumbull (1710–1785)	October 13, 1769 – May 13, 1784 (5327 days; retired)	No parties	1778	Matthew Griswold
16	Jonathan Trumbull (1710–1785)	October 13, 1769 – May 13, 1784 (5327 days; retired)	No parties	1779	Matthew Griswold
16	Jonathan Trumbull (1710–1785)	October 13, 1769 – May 13, 1784 (5327 days; retired)	No parties	1780	Matthew Griswold
16	Jonathan Trumbull (1710–1785)	October 13, 1769 – May 13, 1784 (5327 days; retired)	No parties	1781	Matthew Griswold
16	Jonathan Trumbull (1710–1785)	October 13, 1769 – May 13, 1784 (5327 days; retired)	No parties	1782	Matthew Griswold
16	Jonathan Trumbull (1710–1785)	October 13, 1769 – May 13, 1784 (5327 days; retired)	No parties	1783	Matthew Griswold
17	Matthew Griswold (1714–1799)	May 13, 1784 – May 11, 1786 (729 days; lost election)	No parties	1784	Samuel Huntington
17	Matthew Griswold (1714–1799)	May 13, 1784 – May 11, 1786 (729 days; lost election)	No parties	1785	Samuel Huntington
18	Samuel Huntington (1731–1796)	May 11, 1786 – January 5, 1796 (3527 days; died in office)	Federalist (Note: Dubin does not assign a party to Huntington, but Kallenbach notes he became a Federalist after parties started forming in the 1790s.)	1786	Oliver Wolcott
18	Samuel Huntington (1731–1796)	May 11, 1786 – January 5, 1796 (3527 days; died in office)	Federalist	1787	Oliver Wolcott
18	Samuel Huntington (1731–1796)	May 11, 1786 – January 5, 1796 (3527 days; died in office)	Federalist	1788	Oliver Wolcott
18	Samuel Huntington (1731–1796)	May 11, 1786 – January 5, 1796 (3527 days; died in office)	Federalist	1789	Oliver Wolcott
18	Samuel Huntington (1731–1796)	May 11, 1786 – January 5, 1796 (3527 days; died in office)	Federalist	1790	Oliver Wolcott
18	Samuel Huntington (1731–1796)	May 11, 1786 – January 5, 1796 (3527 days; died in office)	Federalist	1791	Oliver Wolcott
18	Samuel Huntington (1731–1796)	May 11, 1786 – January 5, 1796 (3527 days; died in office)	Federalist	1792	Oliver Wolcott
18	Samuel Huntington (1731–1796)	May 11, 1786 – January 5, 1796 (3527 days; died in office)	Federalist	1793	Oliver Wolcott
18	Samuel Huntington (1731–1796)	May 11, 1786 – January 5, 1796 (3527 days; died in office)	Federalist	1794	Oliver Wolcott
18	Samuel Huntington (1731–1796)	May 11, 1786 – January 5, 1796 (3527 days; died in office)	Federalist	1795	Oliver Wolcott
19	Oliver Wolcott (1726–1797)	January 5, 1796 – December 1, 1797 (697 days; died in office)	Federalist (Note: Dubin does not label Wolcott's party in 1796, and labels him Federalist in 1797; Kallenbach labels him a Federalist, while labeling all parties in election returns until 1802 as unidentified.)	Lieutenant governor acting	Acting as governor
19	Oliver Wolcott (1726–1797)	January 5, 1796 – December 1, 1797 (697 days; died in office)	Federalist	1796	Jonathan Trumbull Jr.
19	Oliver Wolcott (1726–1797)	January 5, 1796 – December 1, 1797 (697 days; died in office)	Federalist	1797	Jonathan Trumbull Jr.
20	Jonathan Trumbull Jr. (1740–1809)	December 1, 1797 – August 7, 1809 (4267 days; died in office)	Federalist	Lieutenant governor acting	Acting as governor
20	Jonathan Trumbull Jr. (1740–1809)	December 1, 1797 – August 7, 1809 (4267 days; died in office)	Federalist	1798	John Treadwell
20	Jonathan Trumbull Jr. (1740–1809)	December 1, 1797 – August 7, 1809 (4267 days; died in office)	Federalist	1799	John Treadwell
20	Jonathan Trumbull Jr. (1740–1809)	December 1, 1797 – August 7, 1809 (4267 days; died in office)	Federalist	1800	John Treadwell
20	Jonathan Trumbull Jr. (1740–1809)	December 1, 1797 – August 7, 1809 (4267 days; died in office)	Federalist	1801	John Treadwell
20	Jonathan Trumbull Jr. (1740–1809)	December 1, 1797 – August 7, 1809 (4267 days; died in office)	Federalist	1802	John Treadwell
20	Jonathan Trumbull Jr. (1740–1809)	December 1, 1797 – August 7, 1809 (4267 days; died in office)	Federalist	1803	John Treadwell
20	Jonathan Trumbull Jr. (1740–1809)	December 1, 1797 – August 7, 1809 (4267 days; died in office)	Federalist	1804	John Treadwell
20	Jonathan Trumbull Jr. (1740–1809)	December 1, 1797 – August 7, 1809 (4267 days; died in office)	Federalist	1805	John Treadwell
20	Jonathan Trumbull Jr. (1740–1809)	December 1, 1797 – August 7, 1809 (4267 days; died in office)	Federalist	1806	John Treadwell
20	Jonathan Trumbull Jr. (1740–1809)	December 1, 1797 – August 7, 1809 (4267 days; died in office)	Federalist	1807	John Treadwell
20	Jonathan Trumbull Jr. (1740–1809)	December 1, 1797 – August 7, 1809 (4267 days; died in office)	Federalist	1808	John Treadwell
20	Jonathan Trumbull Jr. (1740–1809)	December 1, 1797 – August 7, 1809 (4267 days; died in office)	Federalist	1809	John Treadwell
21	John Treadwell (1745–1823)	August 7, 1809 – May 9, 1811 (641 days; lost election)	Federalist	Lieutenant governor acting	Acting as governor
21	John Treadwell (1745–1823)	August 7, 1809 – May 9, 1811 (641 days; lost election)	Federalist	1810	Roger Griswold
22	Roger Griswold (1762–1812)	May 9, 1811 – October 25, 1812 (536 days; died in office)	Federalist	1811	John Cotton Smith
22	Roger Griswold (1762–1812)	May 9, 1811 – October 25, 1812 (536 days; died in office)	Federalist	1812	John Cotton Smith
23	John Cotton Smith (1765–1845)	October 25, 1812 – May 8, 1817 (1657 days; lost election)	Federalist	Lieutenant governor acting	Acting as governor
23	John Cotton Smith (1765–1845)	October 25, 1812 – May 8, 1817 (1657 days; lost election)	Federalist	1813	Chauncey Goodrich (died August 18, 1815)
23	John Cotton Smith (1765–1845)	October 25, 1812 – May 8, 1817 (1657 days; lost election)	Federalist	1814	Chauncey Goodrich (died August 18, 1815)
23	John Cotton Smith (1765–1845)	October 25, 1812 – May 8, 1817 (1657 days; lost election)	Federalist	1815	Chauncey Goodrich (died August 18, 1815)
23	John Cotton Smith (1765–1845)	October 25, 1812 – May 8, 1817 (1657 days; lost election)	Federalist	1815	Vacant
23	John Cotton Smith (1765–1845)	October 25, 1812 – May 8, 1817 (1657 days; lost election)	Federalist	1816	Jonathan Ingersoll (Note: Represented the Democratic-Republican Party until 1817, and the Toleration Party after that.) (died January 12, 1823)
24	Oliver Wolcott Jr. (1760–1833)	May 8, 1817 – May 2, 1827 (3647 days; lost election)	Toleration (Note: The specific party names were the Toleration and Reform Party in 1817 and the Constitutional and Reform Party in 1818.)	1817	Jonathan Ingersoll (died January 12, 1823)
24	Oliver Wolcott Jr. (1760–1833)	May 8, 1817 – May 2, 1827 (3647 days; lost election)	Toleration	1818	Jonathan Ingersoll (died January 12, 1823)
24	Oliver Wolcott Jr. (1760–1833)	May 8, 1817 – May 2, 1827 (3647 days; lost election)	Democratic- Republican (Note: Sources disagree on when Wolcott became a Democratic-Republican, with Dubin saying either 1817 or 1818, Sobel & Raimo saying 1819, and Kallenbach saying 1820.)	1819	Jonathan Ingersoll (died January 12, 1823)
24	Oliver Wolcott Jr. (1760–1833)	May 8, 1817 – May 2, 1827 (3647 days; lost election)	Democratic- Republican	1820	Jonathan Ingersoll (died January 12, 1823)
24	Oliver Wolcott Jr. (1760–1833)	May 8, 1817 – May 2, 1827 (3647 days; lost election)	Democratic- Republican	1821	Jonathan Ingersoll (died January 12, 1823)
24	Oliver Wolcott Jr. (1760–1833)	May 8, 1817 – May 2, 1827 (3647 days; lost election)	Democratic- Republican	1822	Jonathan Ingersoll (died January 12, 1823)
24	Oliver Wolcott Jr. (1760–1833)	May 8, 1817 – May 2, 1827 (3647 days; lost election)	Democratic- Republican	1822	Vacant
24	Oliver Wolcott Jr. (1760–1833)	May 8, 1817 – May 2, 1827 (3647 days; lost election)	Democratic- Republican	1823	David Plant (Note: The list of lieutenant governors supplied by the Connecticut Secretary of State marks these lieutenant governors as having no record of their party.)
24	Oliver Wolcott Jr. (1760–1833)	May 8, 1817 – May 2, 1827 (3647 days; lost election)	Democratic- Republican	1824	David Plant
24	Oliver Wolcott Jr. (1760–1833)	May 8, 1817 – May 2, 1827 (3647 days; lost election)	Democratic- Republican	1825	David Plant
24	Oliver Wolcott Jr. (1760–1833)	May 8, 1817 – May 2, 1827 (3647 days; lost election)	Democratic- Republican	1826	David Plant
25	Gideon Tomlinson (1780–1854)	May 2, 1827 – March 2, 1831 (1401 days; resigned) (Note: Tomlinson resigned, having been elected to the United States Senate.)	Democratic- Republican (Note: Sobel says Tomlinson was nominated by the "Democratic-Republican and Toleration Party Nominating Caucus," but Dubin simply labels him as Democratic-Republican.)	1827	John Samuel Peters (Note: Represented the National Republican Party)
25	Gideon Tomlinson (1780–1854)	May 2, 1827 – March 2, 1831 (1401 days; resigned)	National; Republican	1828	John Samuel Peters
25	Gideon Tomlinson (1780–1854)	May 2, 1827 – March 2, 1831 (1401 days; resigned)	National; Republican	1829	John Samuel Peters
25	Gideon Tomlinson (1780–1854)	May 2, 1827 – March 2, 1831 (1401 days; resigned)	National; Republican	1830	John Samuel Peters
26	John Samuel Peters (1772–1858)	March 2, 1831 – May 4, 1833 (795 days; lost election)	National; Republican	Lieutenant governor acting	Acting as governor
26	John Samuel Peters (1772–1858)	March 2, 1831 – May 4, 1833 (795 days; lost election)	National; Republican	1831	Vacant
26	John Samuel Peters (1772–1858)	March 2, 1831 – May 4, 1833 (795 days; lost election)	National; Republican	1832	Thaddeus Betts
27	Henry W. Edwards (1779–1847)	May 4, 1833 – May 7, 1834 (369 days; lost election)	Democratic	1833	Ebenezer Stoddard
28	Samuel A. Foot (1780–1846)	May 7, 1834 – May 6, 1835 (365 days; lost election)	Whig (Note: Both Dubin and Kallenbach describe Foot as a National Republican, but Sobel & Raimo note he was nominated by the "newly-formed Whig Party - emerging from the ruins of the National Republican Party.")	1834	Thaddeus Betts
29	Henry W. Edwards (1779–1847)	May 6, 1835 – May 3, 1838 (1094 days; retired)	Democratic	1835	Ebenezer Stoddard
29	Henry W. Edwards (1779–1847)	May 6, 1835 – May 3, 1838 (1094 days; retired)	Democratic	1836	Ebenezer Stoddard
29	Henry W. Edwards (1779–1847)	May 6, 1835 – May 3, 1838 (1094 days; retired)	Democratic	1837	Ebenezer Stoddard
30	William W. Ellsworth (1791–1868)	May 3, 1838 – May 6, 1842 (1465 days; lost election)	Whig	1838	Charles Hawley
30	William W. Ellsworth (1791–1868)	May 3, 1838 – May 6, 1842 (1465 days; lost election)	Whig	1839	Charles Hawley
30	William W. Ellsworth (1791–1868)	May 3, 1838 – May 6, 1842 (1465 days; lost election)	Whig	1840	Charles Hawley
30	William W. Ellsworth (1791–1868)	May 3, 1838 – May 6, 1842 (1465 days; lost election)	Whig	1841	Charles Hawley
31	Chauncey F. Cleveland (1799–1887)	May 6, 1842 – May 2, 1844 (728 days; lost election)	Democratic	1842	William S. Holabird
31	Chauncey F. Cleveland (1799–1887)	May 6, 1842 – May 2, 1844 (728 days; lost election)	Democratic	1843	William S. Holabird
32	Roger Sherman Baldwin (1793–1863)	May 2, 1844 – May 8, 1846 (737 days; retired)	Whig	1844	Reuben Booth
32	Roger Sherman Baldwin (1793–1863)	May 2, 1844 – May 8, 1846 (737 days; retired)	Whig	1845	Reuben Booth
33	Isaac Toucey (1792–1869)	May 8, 1846 – May 5, 1847 (363 days; lost nomination) (Note: Toucey lost the Democratic nomination to Thomas T. Whittlesey.)	Democratic	1846	Noyes Billings
34	Clark Bissell (1782–1857)	May 5, 1847 – May 3, 1849 (730 days; lost nomination)	Whig	1847	Charles J. McCurdy
34	Clark Bissell (1782–1857)	May 5, 1847 – May 3, 1849 (730 days; lost nomination)	Whig	1848	Charles J. McCurdy
35	Joseph Trumbull (1782–1861)	May 3, 1849 – May 2, 1850 (365 days; retired)	Whig	1849	Thomas Backus
36	Thomas H. Seymour (1807–1868)	May 2, 1850 (Note: The constitutional start date for the term in 1850 was May 1; the delay is likely because Seymour was chosen by the legislature after a close election.) – October 13, 1853 (1261 days; resigned) (Note: Seymour resigned, having been appointed United States Minister to Russia.)	Democratic	1850	Charles H. Pond
36	Thomas H. Seymour (1807–1868)	May 2, 1850 – October 13, 1853 (1261 days; resigned)	Democratic	1851	Green Kendrick (Note: Represented the Whig Party)
36	Thomas H. Seymour (1807–1868)	May 2, 1850 – October 13, 1853 (1261 days; resigned)	Democratic	1852	Charles H. Pond
36	Thomas H. Seymour (1807–1868)	May 2, 1850 – October 13, 1853 (1261 days; resigned)	Democratic	1853	Charles H. Pond
37	Charles H. Pond (1781–1861)	October 13, 1853 – May 4, 1854 (204 days; retired)	Democratic	Lieutenant governor acting	Acting as governor
38	Henry Dutton (1796–1869)	May 4, 1854 – May 3, 1855 (365 days; lost election)	Whig	1854	Alexander H. Holley
39	William T. Minor (1815–1889)	May 3, 1855 – May 6, 1857 (735 days; retired)	American	1855	William Field (Note: Represented the Free Soil Party)
39	William T. Minor (1815–1889)	May 3, 1855 – May 6, 1857 (735 days; retired)	American	1856	Albert Day
40	Alexander H. Holley (1804–1887)	May 6, 1857 – May 5, 1858 (365 days; retired)	Republican (Note: Holley's party is described as American Republican by the state; Whig by the National Governor's Association, due to early membership in that party; "Union Party", a coalition of Know Nothings and Republicans, by Sobel & Raimo; and simply Republican by Dubin.)	1857	Alfred A. Burnham
41	William A. Buckingham (1804–1875)	May 5, 1858 – May 2, 1866 (2920 days; retired)	Republican (Note: Buckingham, a Republican, and Averill, a War Democrat, ran together on a fusion ticket in 1862 as the Union Party of Connecticut.)	1858	Julius Catlin
41	William A. Buckingham (1804–1875)	May 5, 1858 – May 2, 1866 (2920 days; retired)	Republican	1859	Julius Catlin
41	William A. Buckingham (1804–1875)	May 5, 1858 – May 2, 1866 (2920 days; retired)	Republican	1860	Julius Catlin
41	William A. Buckingham (1804–1875)	May 5, 1858 – May 2, 1866 (2920 days; retired)	Republican	1861	Benjamin Douglas
41	William A. Buckingham (1804–1875)	May 5, 1858 – May 2, 1866 (2920 days; retired)	Republican	1862	Roger Averill (Note: Averill, a War Democrat, represented the Union Party; he and Buckingham were elected on a fusion ticket.)
41	William A. Buckingham (1804–1875)	May 5, 1858 – May 2, 1866 (2920 days; retired)	Republican	1863	Roger Averill
41	William A. Buckingham (1804–1875)	May 5, 1858 – May 2, 1866 (2920 days; retired)	Republican	1864	Roger Averill
41	William A. Buckingham (1804–1875)	May 5, 1858 – May 2, 1866 (2920 days; retired)	Republican	1865	Roger Averill
42	Joseph R. Hawley (1826–1905)	May 2, 1866 – May 1, 1867 (365 days; lost election)	Republican	1866	Oliver Winchester
43	James E. English (1812–1890)	May 1, 1867 – May 5, 1869 (736 days; lost election)	Democratic	1867	Ephraim H. Hyde
43	James E. English (1812–1890)	May 1, 1867 – May 5, 1869 (736 days; lost election)	Democratic	1868	Ephraim H. Hyde
44	Marshall Jewell (1825–1883)	May 5, 1869 – May 4, 1870 (365 days; lost election)	Republican	1869	Francis Wayland III
45	James E. English (1812–1890)	May 4, 1870 – May 16, 1871 (378 days; lost election) (Note: James English won the popular vote, but a canvassing committee found the election was fraudulent, and named Jewell governor several days into the term.)	Democratic	1870	Julius Hotchkiss
46	Marshall Jewell (1825–1883)	May 16, 1871 – May 7, 1873 (723 days; retired)	Republican	1871	Morris Tyler
46	Marshall Jewell (1825–1883)	May 16, 1871 – May 7, 1873 (723 days; retired)	Republican	1872	Morris Tyler
47	Charles Roberts Ingersoll (1821–1903)	May 7, 1873 – January 3, 1877 (1338 days; retired)	Democratic	1873	George G. Sill (Note: The list of lieutenant governors supplied by the Connecticut Secretary of State marks Sill as having represented the Republican Party, but contemporary news on his death reported him as having been a Democrat.)
47	Charles Roberts Ingersoll (1821–1903)	May 7, 1873 – January 3, 1877 (1338 days; retired)	Democratic	1874	George G. Sill
47	Charles Roberts Ingersoll (1821–1903)	May 7, 1873 – January 3, 1877 (1338 days; retired)	Democratic	1875	George G. Sill
47	Charles Roberts Ingersoll (1821–1903)	May 7, 1873 – January 3, 1877 (1338 days; retired)	Democratic	^{Apr.}1876 (Note: This term was only from May 1876 to January 1877, due to a constitutional amendment moving the election schedule.)	George G. Sill
48	Richard D. Hubbard (1818–1884)	January 3, 1877 – January 9, 1879 (737 days; lost election)	Democratic	^{Nov.}1876 (Note: First election under a constitutional amendment which lengthened terms to two years.)	Francis Loomis
49	Charles B. Andrews (1834–1902)	January 9, 1879 (Note: The constitutional start date for the term in 1879 was January 8; the delay may be because Andrews was chosen by the legislature after a close election.) – January 5, 1881 (728 days; retired)	Republican	1878	David Gallup
50	Hobart B. Bigelow (1834–1891)	January 5, 1881 – January 3, 1883 (729 days; retired)	Republican	1880	William H. Bulkeley
51	Thomas M. Waller (1839–1924)	January 3, 1883 – January 8, 1885 (737 days; lost election)	Democratic	1882	George G. Sumner
52	Henry Baldwin Harrison (1821–1901)	January 8, 1885 (Note: The constitutional start date for the term in 1885 was January 7; the delay may be because Harrison was chosen by the legislature after a close election.) – January 6, 1887 (729 days; retired)	Republican	1884	Lorrin A. Cooke
53	Phineas C. Lounsbury (1841–1925)	January 6, 1887 (Note: The constitutional start date for the term in 1887 was January 5; the delay may be because Lounsbury was chosen by the legislature after a close election.) – January 10, 1889 (736 days; retired)	Republican	1886	James L. Howard
54	Morgan Bulkeley (1837–1922)	January 10, 1889 (Note: The constitutional start date for the term in 1889 was January 9; the delay may be because Bulkeley was chosen by the legislature after a close election.) – January 4, 1893 (1456 days; retired)	Republican	1888	Samuel E. Merwin
54	Morgan Bulkeley (1837–1922)	January 10, 1889 – January 4, 1893 (1456 days; retired)	Republican	1890 (Note: Morgan Bulkeley did not run for reelection in 1890, but due to a close contest and controversies, the results were not certified, and the legislature spent two years debating the issue; Bulkeley essentially served as governor by default.)	Samuel E. Merwin
55	Luzon B. Morris (1827–1895)	January 4, 1893 – January 9, 1895 (736 days; retired)	Democratic	1892	Ernest Cady
56	Owen Vincent Coffin (1836–1921)	January 9, 1895 – January 6, 1897 (729 days; retired)	Republican	1894	Lorrin A. Cooke
57	Lorrin A. Cooke (1831–1902)	January 6, 1897 – January 4, 1899 (729 days; retired)	Republican	1896	James D. Dewell
58	George E. Lounsbury (1838–1904)	January 4, 1899 – January 9, 1901 (736 days; retired)	Republican	1898	Lyman A. Mills
59	George P. McLean (1857–1932)	January 9, 1901 – January 7, 1903 (729 days; retired)	Republican	1900	Edwin O. Keeler
60	Abiram Chamberlain (1837–1911)	January 7, 1903 – January 4, 1905 (729 days; retired)	Republican	1902	Henry Roberts
61	Henry Roberts (1853–1929)	January 4, 1905 – January 9, 1907 (736 days; retired)	Republican	1904	Rollin S. Woodruff
62	Rollin S. Woodruff (1854–1925)	January 9, 1907 – January 6, 1909 (729 days; retired)	Republican	1906	Everett J. Lake
63	George L. Lilley (1859–1909)	January 6, 1909 – April 21, 1909 (106 days; died in office)	Republican	1908	Frank B. Weeks
64	Frank B. Weeks (1854–1935)	April 21, 1909 – January 4, 1911 (624 days; retired)	Republican	Lieutenant governor acting	Acting as governor
65	Simeon E. Baldwin (1840–1927)	January 4, 1911 – January 6, 1915 (1464 days; retired) (Note: Baldwin instead ran unsuccessfully for the United States Senate.)	Democratic	1910	Dennis A. Blakeslee (Note: Represented the Republican Party)
65	Simeon E. Baldwin (1840–1927)	January 4, 1911 – January 6, 1915 (1464 days; retired)	Democratic	1912	Lyman T. Tingier
66	Marcus H. Holcomb (1844–1932)	January 6, 1915 – January 5, 1921 (2192 days; retired)	Republican	1914	Clifford B. Wilson
66	Marcus H. Holcomb (1844–1932)	January 6, 1915 – January 5, 1921 (2192 days; retired)	Republican	1916	Clifford B. Wilson
66	Marcus H. Holcomb (1844–1932)	January 6, 1915 – January 5, 1921 (2192 days; retired)	Republican	1918	Clifford B. Wilson
67	Everett J. Lake (1871–1948)	January 5, 1921 – January 3, 1923 (729 days; retired)	Republican	1920	Charles A. Templeton
68	Charles A. Templeton (1871–1955)	January 3, 1923 – January 7, 1925 (736 days; retired)	Republican	1922	Hiram Bingham III
69	Hiram Bingham III (1875–1956)	January 7, 1925 – January 8, 1925 (2 days; resigned) (Note: Bingham resigned, having been elected to the United States Senate.)	Republican	1924	John H. Trumbull
70	John H. Trumbull (1873–1961)	January 8, 1925 – January 7, 1931 (2191 days; retired)	Republican	Lieutenant governor acting	Acting as governor (Note: Since Trumbull took over only one day into the term, nearly all sources describe J. Edwin Brainard as lieutenant governor during this term; however, constitutionally, he would have remained president of the senate and only acted as lieutenant governor. At least one contemporary news source described him as such.)
70	John H. Trumbull (1873–1961)	January 8, 1925 – January 7, 1931 (2191 days; retired)	Republican	1926	J. Edwin Brainard
70	John H. Trumbull (1873–1961)	January 8, 1925 – January 7, 1931 (2191 days; retired)	Republican	1928	Ernest E. Rogers
71	Wilbur Lucius Cross (1862–1948)	January 7, 1931 – January 4, 1939 (2920 days; lost election)	Democratic	1930	Samuel R. Spencer
71	Wilbur Lucius Cross (1862–1948)	January 7, 1931 – January 4, 1939 (2920 days; lost election)	Democratic	1932	Roy C. Wilcox
71	Wilbur Lucius Cross (1862–1948)	January 7, 1931 – January 4, 1939 (2920 days; lost election)	Democratic	1934	T. Frank Hayes
71	Wilbur Lucius Cross (1862–1948)	January 7, 1931 – January 4, 1939 (2920 days; lost election)	Democratic	1936	T. Frank Hayes
72	Raymond E. Baldwin (1893–1986)	January 4, 1939 – January 8, 1941 (736 days; lost election)	Republican	1938	James L. McConaughy
73	Robert A. Hurley (1895–1968)	January 8, 1941 – January 6, 1943 (729 days; lost election)	Democratic	1940	Odell Shepard
74	Raymond E. Baldwin (1893–1986)	January 6, 1943 – December 27, 1946 (1452 days; resigned) (Note: Baldwin resigned, having been elected to the United States Senate.)	Republican	1942	William L. Hadden
74	Raymond E. Baldwin (1893–1986)	January 6, 1943 – December 27, 1946 (1452 days; resigned)	Republican	1944	Charles Wilbert Snow (Note: Represented the Democratic Party)
75	Charles Wilbert Snow (1884–1977)	December 27, 1946 – January 8, 1947 (13 days; retired)	Democratic	Lieutenant governor acting	Acting as governor
76	James L. McConaughy (1887–1948)	January 8, 1947 – March 7, 1948 (425 days; died in office)	Republican	1946	James C. Shannon
77	James C. Shannon (1896–1980)	March 7, 1948 – January 5, 1949 (305 days; lost election)	Republican	Lieutenant governor acting	Acting as governor (Note: Robert E. Parsons is always listed as serving as lieutenant governor during this term, but constitutionally he likely would have remained president of the senate. However, questions were raised over whether or not they should fully succeed to the next office.)
78	Chester B. Bowles (1901–1986)	January 5, 1949 – January 3, 1951 (729 days; lost election)	Democratic	1948	William T. Carroll
79	John Davis Lodge (1903–1985)	January 3, 1951 – January 5, 1955 (1464 days; lost election)	Republican	1950 (Note: First term under a constitution amendment which lengthened terms to four years.)	Edward N. Allen
80	Abraham Ribicoff (1910–1998)	January 5, 1955 – January 21, 1961 (2209 days; resigned) (Note: Ribicoff resigned, having been confirmed as United States Secretary of Health, Education, and Welfare.)	Democratic	1954	Charles W. Jewett
80	Abraham Ribicoff (1910–1998)	January 5, 1955 – January 21, 1961 (2209 days; resigned)	Democratic	1958	John N. Dempsey
81	John N. Dempsey (1915–1989)	January 21, 1961 – January 6, 1971 (3638 days; retired)	Democratic	Lieutenant governor acting	Acting as governor (Note: Anthony J. Armentano is always listed as serving as lieutenant governor during this term, but constitutionally he likely would have remained president of the senate. This is the last time such a confusion would exist, as the 1965 constitution established a solid line of succession.)
81	John N. Dempsey (1915–1989)	January 21, 1961 – January 6, 1971 (3638 days; retired)	Democratic	1962	Samuel J. Tedesco (resigned January 15, 1966)
81	John N. Dempsey (1915–1989)	January 21, 1961 – January 6, 1971 (3638 days; retired)	Democratic	1962	Fred J. Doocy
81	John N. Dempsey (1915–1989)	January 21, 1961 – January 6, 1971 (3638 days; retired)	Democratic	1966	Attilio R. Frassinelli
82	Thomas Meskill (1928–2007)	January 6, 1971 – January 8, 1975 (1464 days; retired)	Republican	1970	T. Clark Hull (resigned June 1, 1973)
82	Thomas Meskill (1928–2007)	January 6, 1971 – January 8, 1975 (1464 days; retired)	Republican	1970	Peter L. Cashman
83	Ella Grasso (1919–1981)	January 8, 1975 – December 31, 1980 (2185 days; resigned) (Note: Grasso resigned due to illness.)	Democratic	1974	Robert K. Killian
83	Ella Grasso (1919–1981)	January 8, 1975 – December 31, 1980 (2185 days; resigned)	Democratic	1978	William A. O'Neill
84	William A. O'Neill (1930–2007)	December 31, 1980 – January 9, 1991 (3662 days; retired)	Democratic	Succeeded from lieutenant governor	Joseph J. Fauliso
84	William A. O'Neill (1930–2007)	December 31, 1980 – January 9, 1991 (3662 days; retired)	Democratic	1982	Joseph J. Fauliso
84	William A. O'Neill (1930–2007)	December 31, 1980 – January 9, 1991 (3662 days; retired)	Democratic	1986	Joseph J. Fauliso
85	Lowell Weicker (1931–2023)	January 9, 1991 – January 4, 1995 (1457 days; retired)	A Connecticut; Party	1990	Eunice Groark
86	John G. Rowland (b. 1957)	January 4, 1995 – July 1, 2004 (3467 days; resigned) (Note: Rowland resigned due to a federal corruption investigation; he later pleaded guilty to corruption.)	Republican	1994	Jodi Rell
86	John G. Rowland (b. 1957)	January 4, 1995 – July 1, 2004 (3467 days; resigned)	Republican	1998	Jodi Rell
86	John G. Rowland (b. 1957)	January 4, 1995 – July 1, 2004 (3467 days; resigned)	Republican	2002	Jodi Rell
87	Jodi Rell (1946–2024)	July 1, 2004 – January 5, 2011 (2380 days; retired)	Republican	Succeeded from lieutenant governor	Kevin Sullivan
87	Jodi Rell (1946–2024)	July 1, 2004 – January 5, 2011 (2380 days; retired)	Republican	2006	Michael Fedele
88	Dannel Malloy (b. 1955)	January 5, 2011 – January 9, 2019 (2927 days; retired)	Democratic	2010	Nancy Wyman
88	Dannel Malloy (b. 1955)	January 5, 2011 – January 9, 2019 (2927 days; retired)	Democratic	2014	Nancy Wyman
89	Ned Lamont (b. 1954)	January 9, 2019 – Incumbent (Note: Lamont's second term began on January 4, 2023, and will expire on January 6, 2027; he was elected to a third term on November 3, 2026.) (in office 2875 days)	Democratic	2018	Susan Bysiewicz
89	Ned Lamont (b. 1954)	January 9, 2019 – Incumbent (in office 2875 days)	Democratic	2022	Susan Bysiewicz
89	Ned Lamont (b. 1954)	January 9, 2019 – Incumbent (in office 2875 days)	Democratic	2026	Susan Bysiewicz

== Timeline ==
Timeline of Connecticut governors

== See also ==
- Gubernatorial lines of succession in the United States § Connecticut
- List of colonial governors of Connecticut
- List of lieutenant governors of Connecticut

== Sources ==
- "Governors of Connecticut". National Governors Association.
- "Governors and Deputy or Lieutenant Governors". Secretary of the State of Connecticut. Archived from the original on October 6, 2026.
- "Connecticut Constitution". State Democracy Research Initiative. University of Wisconsin Law School. 1965.
- "Connecticut Constitution". Connecticut General Assembly. 1818. Archived from the original on October 5, 2026.
- Dubin, Michael J. (2003). United States Gubernatorial Elections, 1776–1860: The Official Results by State and County. McFarland. ISBN 0-7864-1439-1 – via Internet Archive.
- Glashan, Roy R. (1979). American Governors and Gubernatorial Elections, 1775-1978. Meckler Books. ISBN 0-7201-1511-6 – via Internet Archive.
- Kallenbach, Joseph E.; Kallenbach, Jessamine S. (1977). American State Governors, 1776-1976. Oceana Publications. ISBN 978-0-379-00665-0 – via Internet Archive.
- Mullaney, Marie Marmo (1994). Biographical Directory of the Governors of the United States, 1988–1994. Greenwood Publishing Group. ISBN 0-313-28312-5 – via Internet Archive.
- Sobel, Robert; Raimo, John (1978). Biographical Directory of the Governors of the United States, 1789-1978. Vol. 1. Meckler Books. ISBN 0-930466-01-2 – via Internet Archive.
- Thorpe, Francis Newton, ed. (1909). The Federal and State Constitutions, Colonial Charters, and Other Organic Laws of the States, Territories, and Colonies Now or Heretofore Forming the United States of America. Vol. 1. United States Government Publishing Office – via Internet Archive.
