= Jonathan Trumbull Jr. =

American politician and military officer (1740–1809)

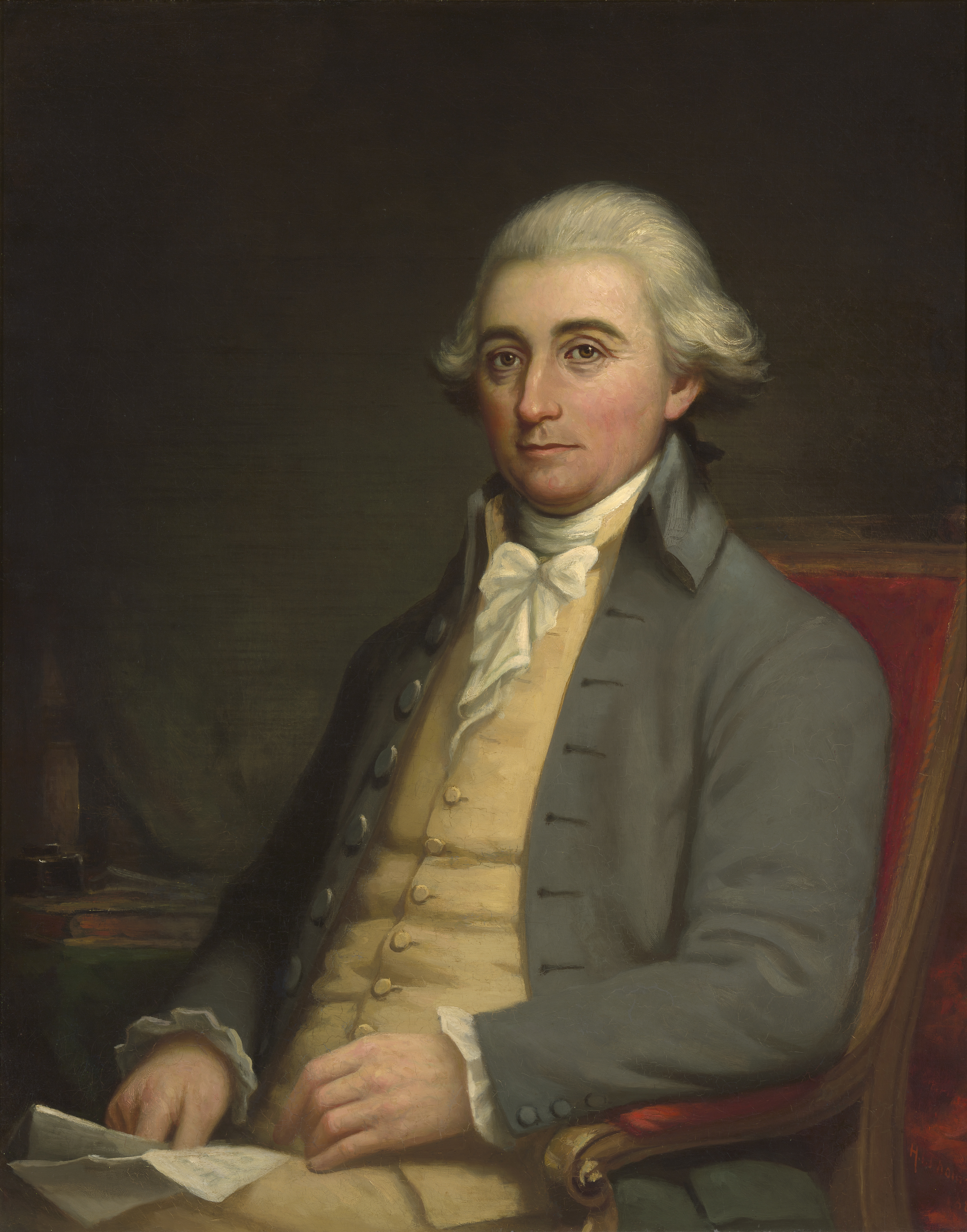
- Posthumous portrait by Harry Ives Thompson, c. 1880

2nd Speaker of the United States House of Representatives
- In office October 24, 1791 – March 3, 1793
- Preceded by: Frederick Muhlenberg
- Succeeded by: Frederick Muhlenberg

20th Governor of Connecticut
- In office December 1, 1797 – August 7, 1809
- Lieutenant: John Treadwell
- Preceded by: Oliver Wolcott
- Succeeded by: John Treadwell

Associate Justice of the Connecticut Supreme Court of Errors
- In office 1796–1807
- In office March 4, 1795 – June 10, 1796
- Preceded by: Stephen Mix Mitchell
- Succeeded by: Uriah Tracy

24th Lieutenant Governor of Connecticut
- In office June 14, 1796 – December 1, 1797
- Governor: Oliver Wolcott
- Preceded by: Oliver Wolcott
- Succeeded by: John Treadwell

Member of the U.S. House of Representatives from Connecticut's at-large district
- In office March 4, 1789 – March 3, 1795
- Preceded by: Constituency established
- Succeeded by: Roger Griswold

Speaker of the Connecticut House of Representatives
- In office 1788

Member of the Connecticut House of Representatives
- In office 1774-1775
- In office 1779-1780
- In office 1788

Personal details
- Born: March 26, 1740 Lebanon, Connecticut Colony, British America
- Died: August 7, 1809 (aged 69) Lebanon, Connecticut, U.S.
- Party: Federalist (1795–1809); Pro-Administration (before 1795)
- Spouse: Eunice Backus
- Children: 5
- Education: Harvard College (AB, AM)
- Occupation: Paymaster, comptroller

Jonathan Trumbull Jr. (March 26, 1740 – August 7, 1809) was an American politician and military officer who served as the governor of Connecticut, speaker of the United States House of Representatives, and lieutenant governor of Connecticut. He is often confused with his younger brother, John Trumbull, a famous artist during the revolutionary war and early years of the United States. He is the longest-serving governor in Connecticut history since the Revolutionary War.

== Early life ==
Trumbull was born in Lebanon, Connecticut, the second son of Jonathan Trumbull Sr. (the eventual governor of Connecticut) and his wife Faith Robinson, daughter of Rev. John Robinson. Trumbull graduated from Harvard College in 1759, and gave the valedictory address when he received his master's degree in 1762. His brother John Trumbull was a noted painter of the Revolution.

== Career ==
=== State and local office ===
Carrying on the family's tradition of public service, Trumbull began with town and colony offices: lister, grand juror, surveyor of highways, justice of the peace, and selectman. In 1774 he was elected deputy. the first of seven terms representing Lebanon. He served in the state legislature three times; from 1774 to 1775, from 1779 to 1780, and in 1788, serving as Speaker of the House in 1788.

=== Revolutionary War ===
Trumbull served in the Continental Army as paymaster general of the Northern Department from July 28, 1775, to July 29, 1778. In February 1781, he was given the rank of lieutenant colonel. He was included in the general orders of June 8, 1781: "Jonathan Trumbull. Esqr., Junior, is appointed Secretary to the Commander in Chief and to be respected accordingly." He served for the duration of the war as aide-de-camp to General George Washington until December 28, 1783. After the war, he became an original member of the Connecticut Society of the Cincinnati.

=== United States Congress ===
Elected to the First, Second, and Third Congresses, Trumbull served in the United States House of Representatives from March 4, 1789, to March 3, 1795. He was the Speaker of the House in the Second Congress, both preceded and succeeded by Frederick A. C. Muhlenberg. He did not seek re-election for a fourth term and instead ran for the United States Senate.

When Trumbull was elected to the United States Senate, he served from March 4, 1795, to June 10, 1796.

=== Governor of Connecticut ===
On June 10, 1796, he resigned from the United States Senate to become Lieutenant Governor of Connecticut. When Governor Wolcott died in December 1797, he became governor and was re-elected to eleven consecutive terms until his death in Lebanon, Connecticut. He also served as a member of the Connecticut Supreme Court of Errors from 1796 to 1807, serving as chief justice while he was governor.

== Personal life ==
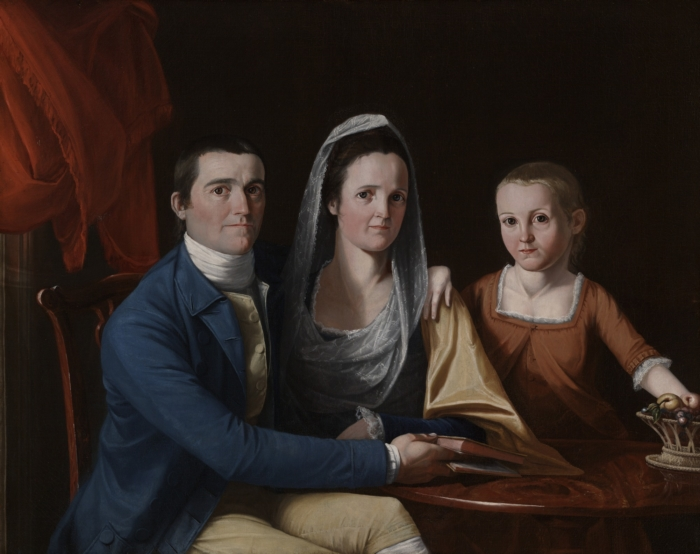
Family portrait of Jonathan, Eunice and Faith painted by his brother, John Trumbull, 1777

Trumbull married Eunice Backus. Together, they had one son and four daughters:

- Jonathan Trumbull (b. December 24, 1767, d. January 14, 1768), who died young
- Faith Trumbull (b. February 1, 1769), who married Daniel Wadsworth (1771–1848), an artist and architect
- Mary Trumbull (b. December 27, 1777)
- Harriet Trumbull Silliman (b. September 2, 1783, d. January 1850), who married Benjamin Silliman (1779–1864), a scientist.
- Maria Trumbull (b. February 14, 1785).

He was elected a Fellow of the American Academy of Arts and Sciences in 1804.

Trumbull died August 7, 1809, aged 69 years. He is interred at Trumbull Cemetery, Lebanon, Connecticut. He was one of the original members of the board of trustees of Bacon Academy.

== See also ==
- Trumbull, Connecticut
- Trumbull County, Ohio

Party political offices
| Preceded by Oliver Wolcott | Federalist nominee for Governor of Connecticut; 1798, 1799, 1800, 1801, 1802, 1803, 1804, 1805, 1806, 1807, 1808, 1809 | Succeeded by John Treadwell |
U.S. House of Representatives
| New district | Member of the U.S. House of Representatives from Connecticut's at-large congressional district March 4, 1789 – March 3, 1795 | Succeeded by Roger Griswold |
Political offices
| Preceded by Frederick Muhlenberg | Speaker of the United States House of Representatives; October 24, 1791 – March 4, 1793 | Succeeded by Frederick Muhlenberg |
| Preceded by Oliver Wolcott | Lieutenant Governor of Connecticut; 1796 – December 1797 | Succeeded by John Treadwell |
| Preceded by Oliver Wolcott | Governor of Connecticut; December 1797 – August 7, 1809 | Succeeded by John Treadwell |
U.S. Senate
| Preceded by Stephen Mix Mitchell | U.S. senator (Class 3) from Connecticut; March 4, 1795 – June 10, 1796; Served alongside: Oliver Ellsworth, James Hillhouse | Succeeded by Uriah Tracy |
