= 1869 Connecticut lieutenant gubernatorial election =

- April 5, 1869
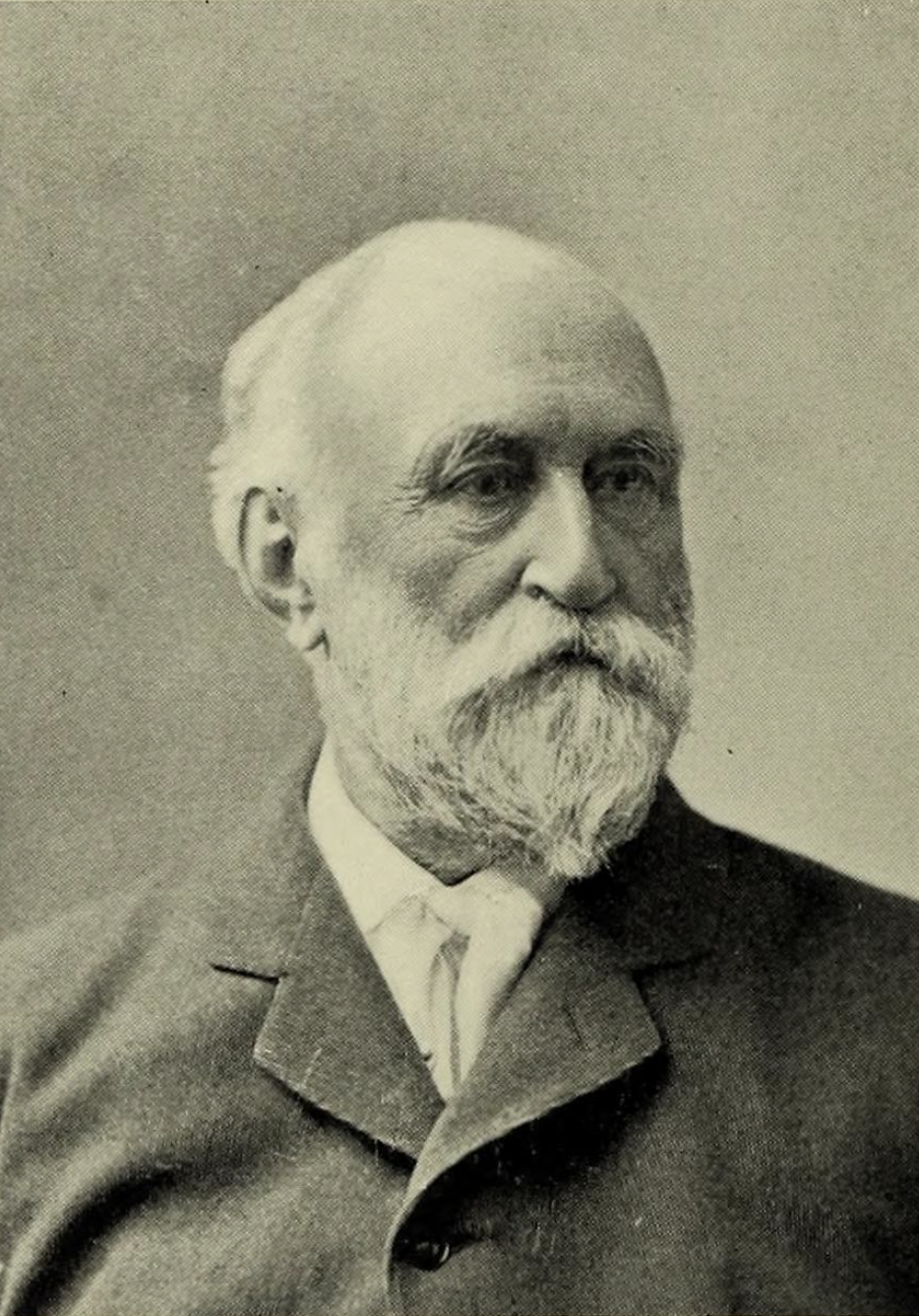

Nominee	Francis Wayland III	Ephraim H. Hyde
Party	Republican	Democratic
Popular vote	45,724	44,710
Percentage	50.60%	49.40%
Lieutenant Governor before election
Ephraim H. Hyde
Democratic
Elected Lieutenant Governor
Francis Wayland III
Republican

The 1869 Connecticut lieutenant gubernatorial election was held on April 5, 1869, to elect the lieutenant governor of Connecticut. Republican nominee Francis Wayland III won the election against incumbent Democratic lieutenant governor Ephraim H. Hyde in a rematch of the previous election.

== General election ==
On election day, April 5, 1869, Republican nominee Francis Wayland III won the election with 50.60% of the vote, thereby gaining Republican control over the office of lieutenant governor. Wayland was sworn in as the 54th lieutenant governor of Connecticut on May 5, 1869.

=== Results ===
Connecticut lieutenant gubernatorial election, 1869
Party	Candidate	Votes	%
Republican	Francis Wayland III	45,724	50.60
Democratic	Ephraim H. Hyde (incumbent)	44,710	49.40
	Scattering	4	0.00
Total votes		90,438	100.00
Republican gain from Democratic			
