= 1868 Connecticut lieutenant gubernatorial election =

- April 6, 1868

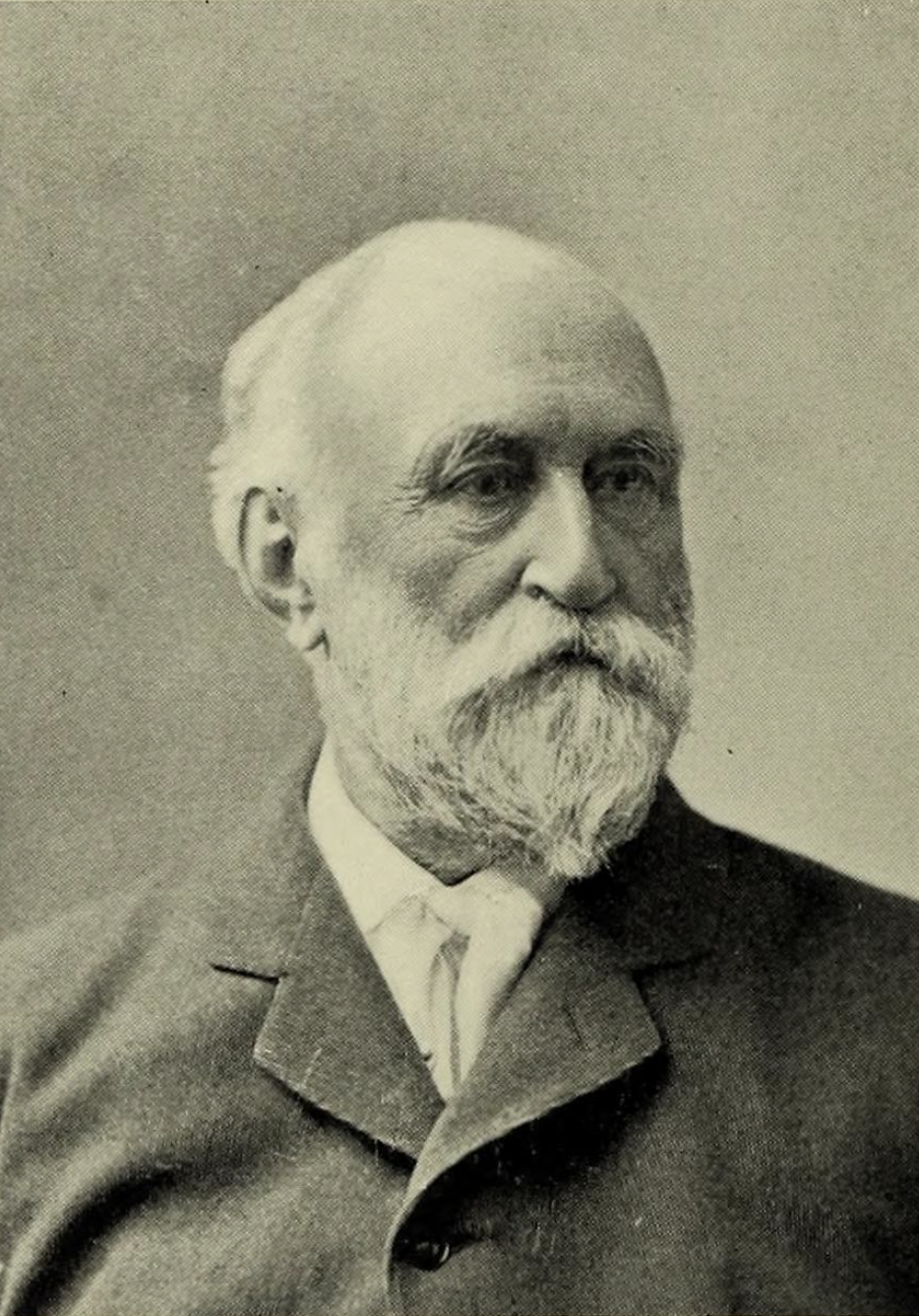
Nominee	Ephraim H. Hyde	Francis Wayland III
Party	Democratic	Republican
Popular vote	50,506	48,806
Percentage	50.85%	49.15%
Lieutenant Governor before election
Ephraim H. Hyde
Democratic
Elected Lieutenant Governor
Ephraim H. Hyde
Democratic

The 1868 Connecticut lieutenant gubernatorial election was held on April 6, 1868, to elect the lieutenant governor of Connecticut. Incumbent Democratic lieutenant governor Ephraim H. Hyde won re-election against Republican nominee Francis Wayland III.

== General election ==
On election day, April 6, 1868, incumbent Democratic lieutenant governor Ephraim H. Hyde won re-election with 50.85% of the vote, thereby retaining Democratic control over the office of lieutenant governor. Hyde was sworn in for his second term on May 6, 1868.

=== Results ===
Connecticut lieutenant gubernatorial election, 1868
Party	Candidate	Votes	%
Democratic	Ephraim H. Hyde (incumbent)	50,506	50.85
Republican	Francis Wayland III	48,806	49.15
	Scattering	2	0.00
Total votes		99,314	100.00
Democratic hold			
