= 1869 Connecticut gubernatorial election =

- April 5, 1869
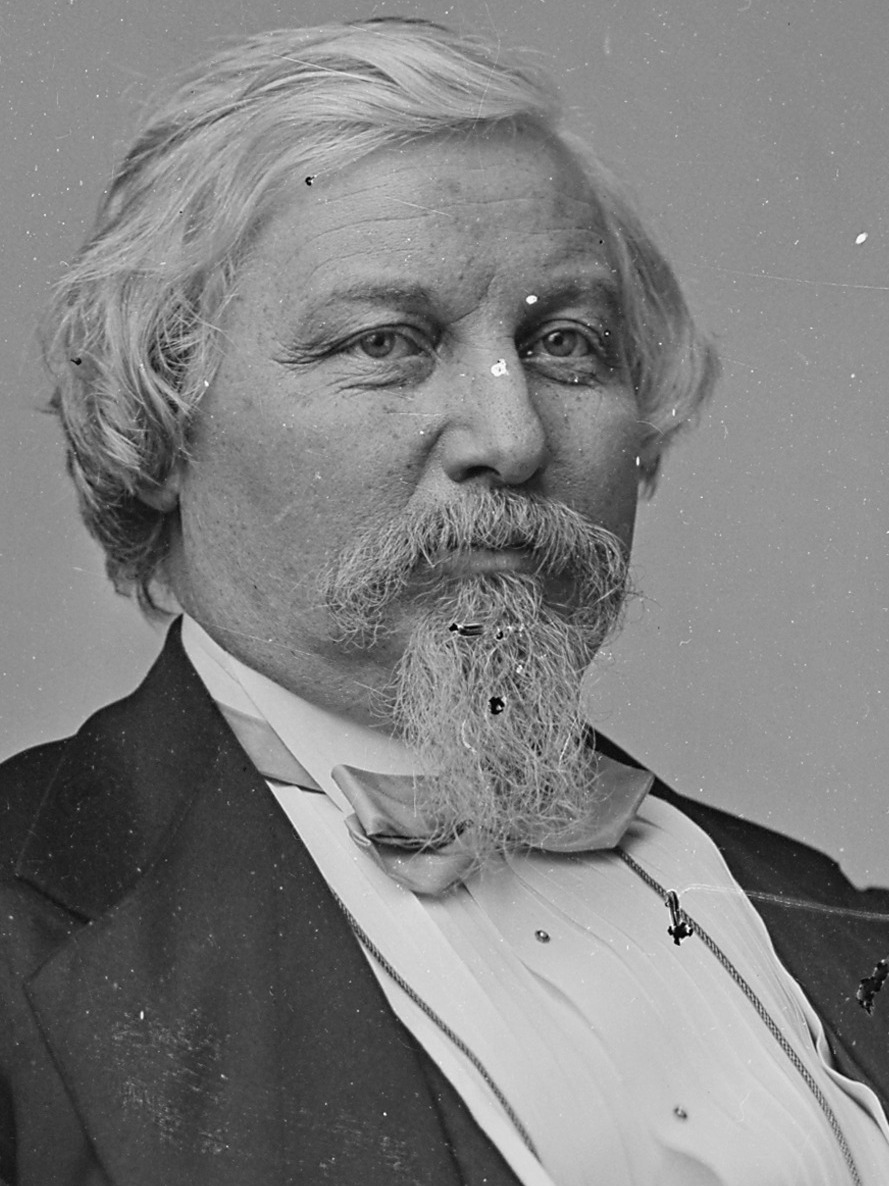

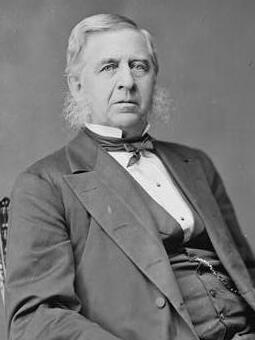
Nominee	Marshall Jewell	James E. English
Party	Republican	Democratic
Popular vote	45,493	45,082
Percentage	50.22%	49.77%
- Jewell: 50–60% 60–70% 70–80% English: 50–60% 60–70% 70–80% 90–100%
Governor before election
James E. English
Democratic
Elected Governor
Marshall Jewell
Republican

The 1869 Connecticut gubernatorial election was held on April 5, 1869. It was a rematch of the 1868 Connecticut gubernatorial election. Republican nominee Marshall Jewell defeated incumbent governor and Democratic nominee James E. English with 50.22% of the vote.

== General election ==
=== Candidates ===
Major party candidates

- Marshall Jewell, Republican
- James E. English, Democratic

=== Results ===
1869 Connecticut gubernatorial election
Party	Candidate	Votes	%	±%
Republican	Marshall Jewell	45,493	50.22%	
Democratic	James E. English (incumbent)	45,082	49.77%	
Other	Others	7	0.01%	
Majority		411		
Turnout				
Republican gain from Democratic		Swing		
