= James E. English =

American politician (1812–1890)

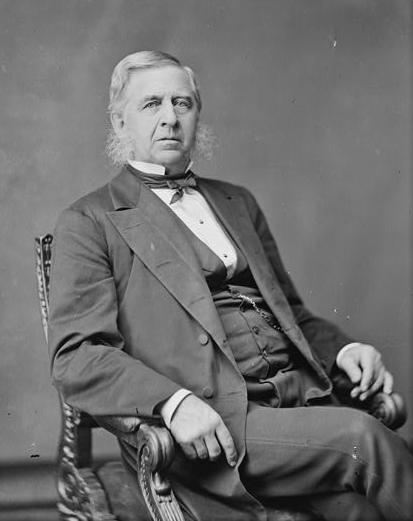
- English, 1865–1880

United States Senator from Connecticut
- In office November 27, 1875 – May 17, 1876
- Appointed by: Charles Roberts Ingersoll
- Preceded by: Orris S. Ferry
- Succeeded by: William H. Barnum

45th Governor of Connecticut
- In office May 4, 1870 – May 16, 1871
- Lieutenant: Julius Hotchkiss
- Preceded by: Marshall Jewell
- Succeeded by: Marshall Jewell

43rd Governor of Connecticut
- In office May 1, 1867 – May 5, 1869
- Lieutenant: Ephraim H. Hyde
- Preceded by: Joseph R. Hawley
- Succeeded by: Marshall Jewell

Member of the U.S. House of Representatives from Connecticut's 2nd district
- In office March 4, 1861 – March 3, 1865
- Preceded by: John Woodruff
- Succeeded by: Samuel L. Warner

Member of the Connecticut Senate
- In office 1856–1858

Member of the Connecticut House of Representatives
- In office 1855; 1872

Personal details
- Born: James Edward English; March 13, 1812 New Haven, Connecticut, U.S.
- Died: March 2, 1890 (aged 77) New Haven, Connecticut, U.S.
- Party: Democratic
- Spouse(s): -Caroline A. Fowler English, Anna Robinson Morris English
- Children: 4
- Profession: Politician, banker, lumberman, manufacturer

James Edward English (March 13, 1812 – March 2, 1890) was a United States representative and later U.S. senator from Connecticut, and governor of Connecticut.

== Early life and education ==
English was born in New Haven, Connecticut, and attended the common schools. An apprentice carpenter at the age of 16, he became a successful businessman, establishing the English and Welch Lumber Company, and restructuring the New Haven Clock Company into one of the largest clock manufacturers. He was twice married, to Caroline A. Fowler and to Anna Robinson Morris. He had four children.

== Career ==
English engaged in the lumber business, banking, and manufacturing. He was a member of the New Haven board of selectmen from 1847 to 1861, and a member of the common council in 1848 and 1849. He was a member of the Connecticut House of Representatives in 1855 and of the Connecticut Senate from 1856 to 1858, and was an unsuccessful candidate for lieutenant governor in 1860.

English was elected as a Democrat to the Thirty-seventh and Thirty-eighth Congresses, serving from March 4, 1861, to March 3, 1865. He was not a candidate for renomination in 1864.

He left his ill wife to vote at the U.S. Capitol, where, despite being a Democrat, he voted in favor of the Thirteenth Amendment abolishing slavery in 1864. His "aye" prompted applause "and the tide turned." He later remarked that voting for the Amendment ruined his standing among Democrats, but he thought it the right thing to do, saying "I suppose I am politically ruined, but that day was the happiest of my life." However, his reservation was not to be, as he had a fairly successful career afterwards.

Unsuccessful in his 1866 gubernatorial bid, English was elected Connecticut's 26th governor on April 1, 1867, serving from May 1, 1867, to May 5, 1869. He was elected again in 1868. He lost his reelection in 1869, but was elected as governor again in 1870 and served from May 4, 1870, to May 16, 1871. During his tenure, an argument between the railroad and shipping industries was settled with the approval for construction of two new bridges. English ran again for reelection in 1871, and won the popular vote, but a canvassing committee found the election was fraudulent with stolen votes and erroneous totals, and awarded the governorship to Marshall Jewell.

English received votes for President at the 1868 Democratic National Convention, reaching a peak of 16 votes from New England delegates on the first ballot; most of English's votes during the Convention came from his home state of Connecticut.

English was elected again in 1872 to serve in the Connecticut House of Representatives. He was appointed as a Democrat to the U.S. Senate to fill the vacancy caused by the death of Orris S. Ferry and served from November 27, 1875, to May 17, 1876, when a successor was elected.

An unsuccessful candidate for election in 1876 to fill the vacancy, English resumed his manufacturing and commercial activities.

== In popular culture ==
- In Steven Spielberg's 2012 film Lincoln, both English and Augustus Brandegee, his abolitionist Republican colleague from Connecticut, are given two fictional names and are both shown, erroneously, to have voted against the amendment.

== Death ==
English died in New Haven March 2, 1890 (age 77 years, 354 days), and is interred at Evergreen Cemetery, New Haven, Connecticut.

Party political offices
| Preceded by Origen S. Seymour | Democratic nominee for Governor of Connecticut; 1866, 1867, 1868, 1869, 1870, 1871 | Succeeded by Richard D. Hubbard |
| Preceded by Richard D. Hubbard | Democratic nominee for Governor of Connecticut; 1880 | Succeeded by Thomas M. Waller |
U.S. House of Representatives
| Preceded by John Woodruff | Member of the U.S. House of Representatives from Connecticut's 2nd congressional district March 4, 1861 – March 3, 1865 | Succeeded by Samuel L. Warner |
Political offices
| Preceded by Joseph R. Hawley | Governor of Connecticut; 1867–1869 | Succeeded by Marshall Jewell |
| Preceded by Marshall Jewell | Governor of Connecticut; 1870–1871 | Succeeded by Marshall Jewell |
U.S. Senate
| Preceded by Orris S. Ferry | U.S. senator (Class 3) from Connecticut; November 27, 1875 – May 17, 1876; Served alongside: William W. Eaton | Succeeded by William H. Barnum |
