= 1870 Connecticut gubernatorial election =

- April 4, 1870
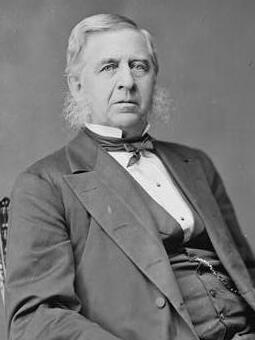

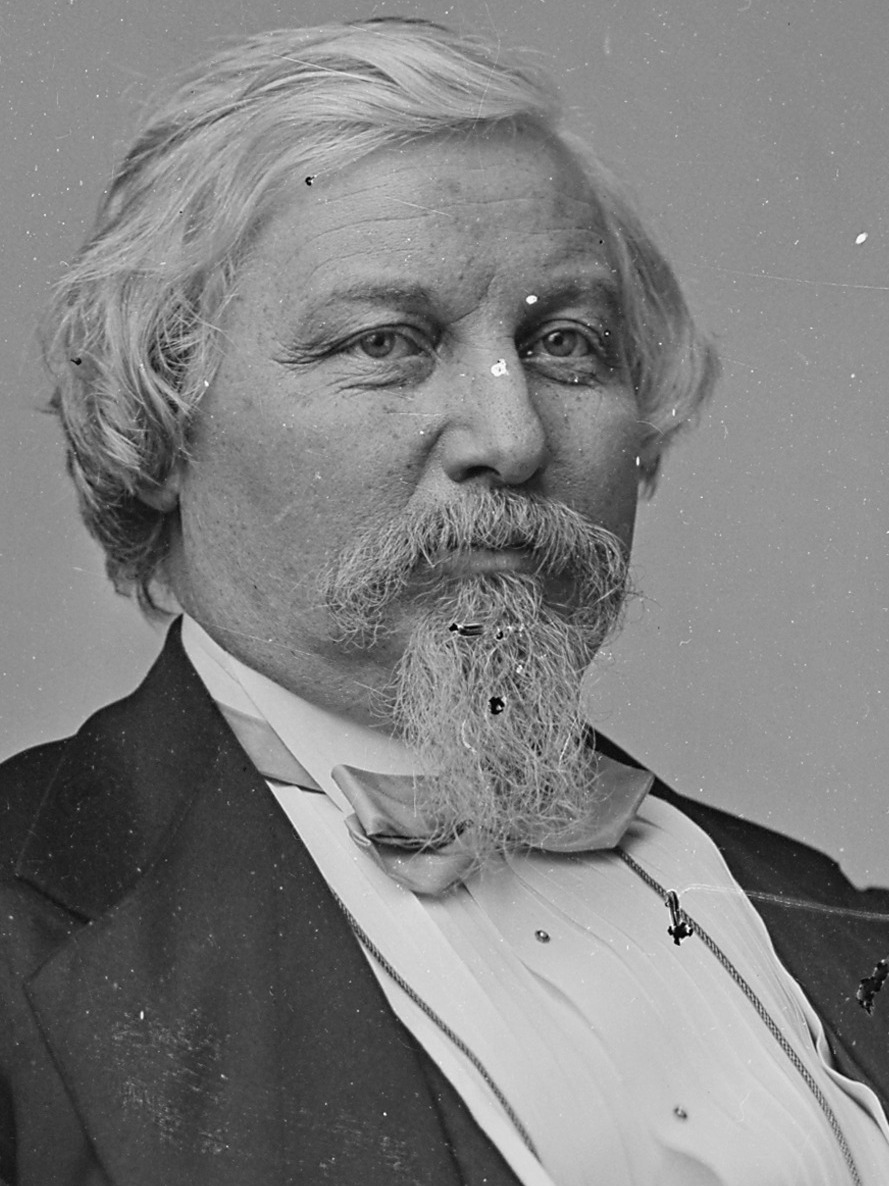
Nominee	James E. English	Marshall Jewell
Party	Democratic	Republican
Popular vote	44,128	43,285
Percentage	50.48%	49.52%
- English: 50–60% 60–70% 70–80% 80–90% Jewell: 50–60% 60–70% 70–80% Tie: 50%
Governor before election
Marshall Jewell
Republican
Elected Governor
James E. English
Democratic

The 1870 Connecticut gubernatorial election was held on April 4, 1870. It was the third consecutive contest between the same two major party nominees. Former governor and Democratic nominee James E. English defeated incumbent governor and Republican nominee Marshall Jewell with 50.48% of the vote.

== General election ==
=== Candidates ===
Major party candidates

- James E. English, Democratic
- Marshall Jewell, Republican

=== Results ===
1870 Connecticut gubernatorial election
Party	Candidate	Votes	%	±%
Democratic	James E. English	44,128	50.48%	
Republican	Marshall Jewell (incumbent)	43,285	49.52%	
Other	Others	2	0.00%	
Majority		843		
Turnout				
Democratic gain from Republican		Swing		
