= 1871 Connecticut gubernatorial election =

- April 3, 1871
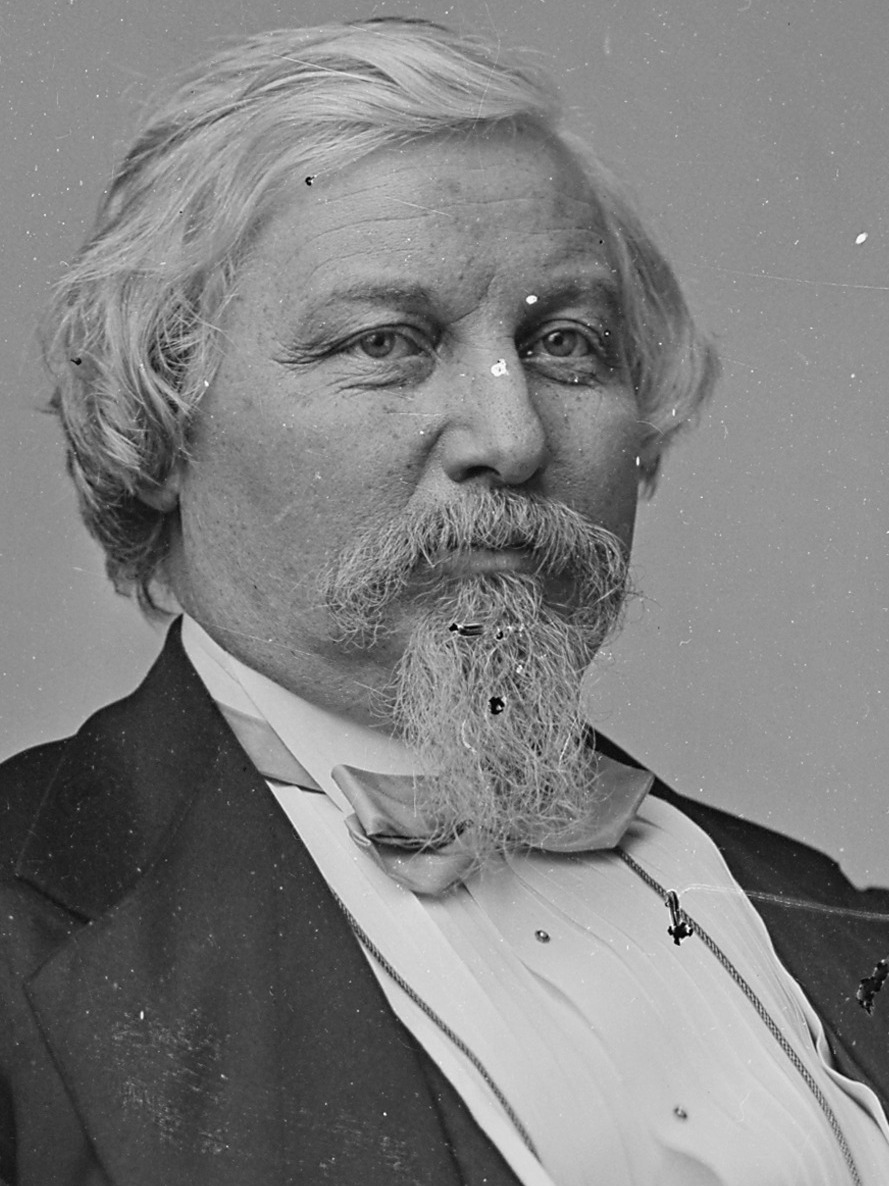

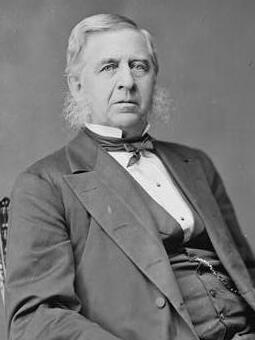
Nominee	Marshall Jewell	James E. English
Party	Republican	Democratic
Popular vote	47,473	47,370
Percentage	50.05%	49.94%
- Jewell: 50–60% 60–70% 70–80% English: 50–60% 60–70% 70–80% Tie: 50%
Governor before election
James E. English
Democratic
Elected Governor
Marshall Jewell
Republican

The 1871 Connecticut gubernatorial election was held on April 3, 1871. It was the fourth consecutive contest between the same two major party nominees. Former governor and Republican nominee Marshall Jewell defeated incumbent governor and Democratic nominee James E. English with 50.05% of the vote.

The race was extremely close, with English finishing ahead in the initial count. However, a canvassing committee found a series of English's votes to be fraudulent and had errors that caused them to be disqualified. An investigation into the votes in Cheshire also added 23 votes to Jewell's total. These events placed Jewell ahead in the vote count with a majority. Jewell would be declared the winner and be seated as governor several days into the next term, and inaugurated governor on May 16, 1871.

== General election ==
=== Candidates ===
Major party candidates

- Marshall Jewell, Republican
- James E. English, Democratic

=== Results ===
1871 Connecticut gubernatorial election, initial canvass
Party	Candidate	Votes	%	±%
Democratic	James E. English (incumbent)	47,492	50.01%	
Republican	Marshall Jewell	47,450	49.97%	
Other	Others	17	0.02%	
Majority		42		
Turnout				
Democratic hold		Swing		

1871 Connecticut gubernatorial election, final results
Party	Candidate	Votes	%	±%
Republican	Marshall Jewell	47,473	50.05%	
Democratic	James E. English (incumbent)	47,370	49.94%	
Other	Others	14	0.01%	
Majority		103		
Turnout				
Republican gain from Democratic		Swing		
