= 1872 Connecticut gubernatorial election =

- April 1, 1872
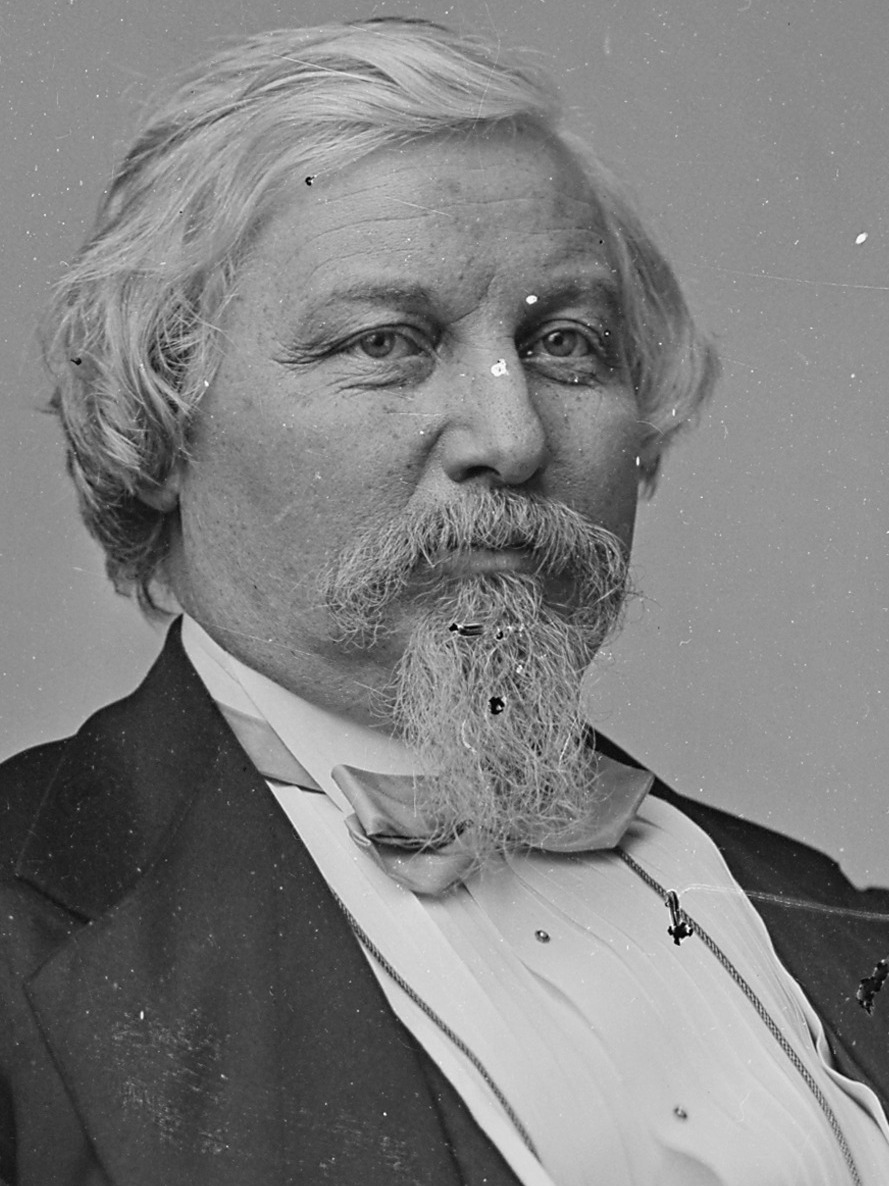

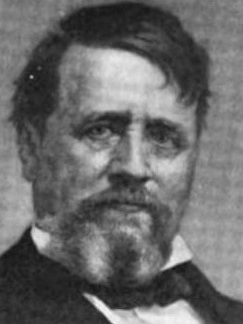
Nominee	Marshall Jewell	Richard D. Hubbard
Party	Republican	Democratic
Popular vote	46,563	44,562
Percentage	50.02%	47.87%
- Jewell: 40–50% 50–60% 60–70% 70–80% Hubbard: 40–50% 50–60% 60–70% 70–80%
Governor before election
Marshall Jewell
Republican
Elected Governor
Marshall Jewell
Republican

The 1872 Connecticut gubernatorial election was held on April 1, 1872. Incumbent governor and Republican nominee Marshall Jewell defeated Democratic nominee Richard D. Hubbard with 50.02% of the vote.

== General election ==
=== Candidates ===
Major party candidates

- Marshall Jewell, Republican
- Richard D. Hubbard, Democratic

Other candidates

- Francis Gillette, Temperance
- Albert R. Harrison, Labor Reform

=== Results ===
1872 Connecticut gubernatorial election
Party	Candidate	Votes	%	±%
Republican	Marshall Jewell (incumbent)	46,563	50.02%	
Democratic	Richard D. Hubbard	44,562	47.87%	
Temperance Party	Francis Gillette	1,549	1.66%	
Labor Reform Party	Albert R. Harrison	399	0.43%	
Other	Others	25	0.03%	
Majority		2,001		
Turnout				
Republican hold		Swing		
