= James William Marshall =

American politician

James Marshall
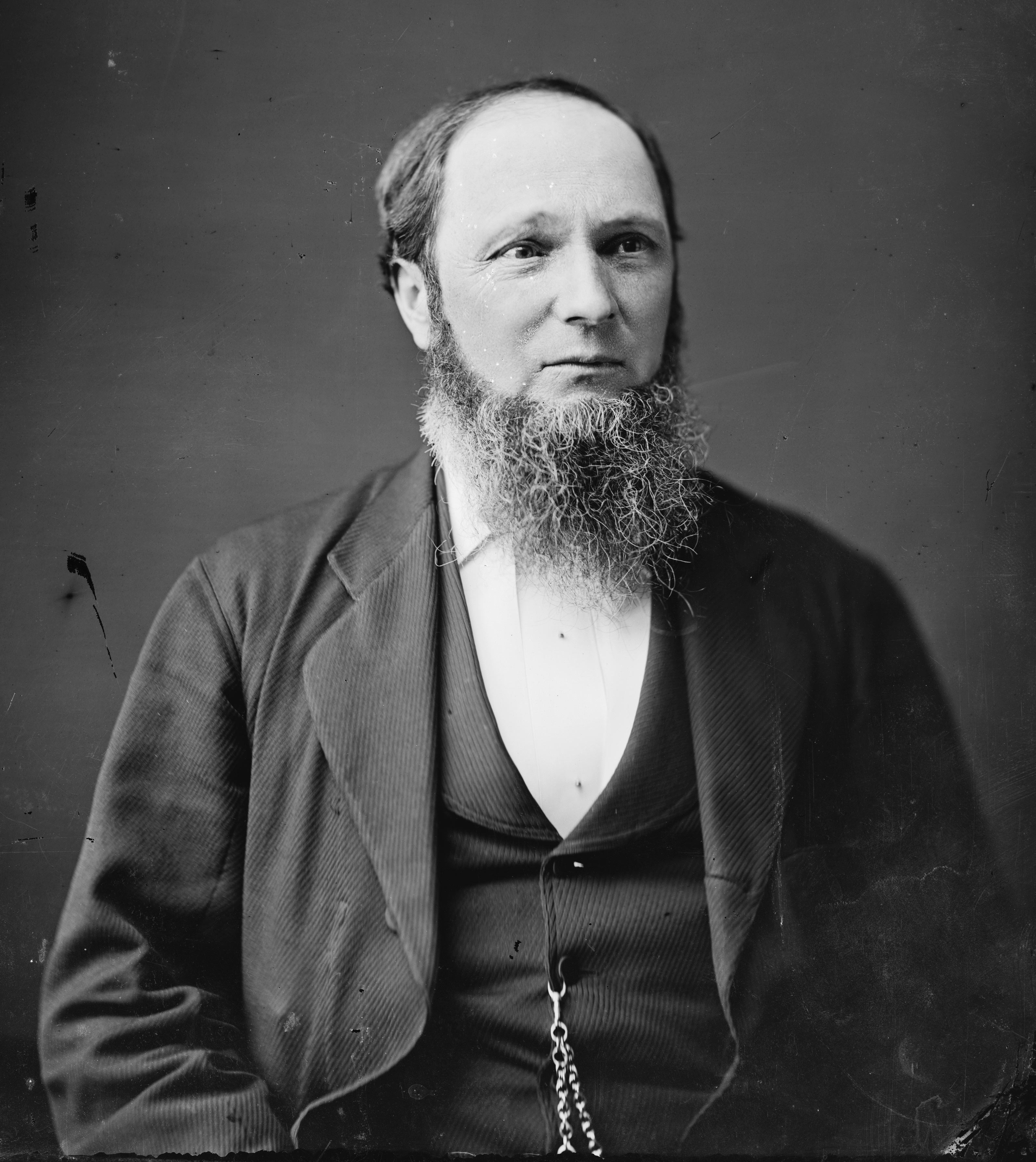

24th United States Postmaster General
- In office July 3, 1874 – August 24, 1874
- President: Ulysses S. Grant
- Preceded by: John Creswell
- Succeeded by: Marshall Jewell

Personal details
- Born: James William Marshall; August 14, 1822 Wilson, Virginia, U.S.
- Died: February 5, 1910 (aged 87) Washington, D.C., U.S.
- Party: Republican
- Education: Dickinson College (BA)
- Occupation: Diplomat, Educator, Other

James William Marshall (August 14, 1822 – February 5, 1910) was a United States Postmaster General under President Ulysses S. Grant as well as a government administrator in several capacities for presidents Lincoln, Grant, and Hayes. Marshall was the third to last surviving cabinet member of the Grant Administration. He was not known for any involvement in Grant administration scandals, and his reputation remained intact. Marshall worked under Postmaster John Creswell who implemented racial integration of African Americans into the U.S. Postal System, during Reconstruction Era, led by President Grant.

== Early life, marriage, and career ==
James William Marshall was born in Clarke County, Virginia, a slave state, on August 14, 1822. His mother was Susan Oreah Marshall and his father was James Pede. His grandfather was Rush Marshall. Marshall attended schools at Clarke and Fauquier Counties until 1837. The same year Marshall was removed to Mount Sterling, Kentucky, also a slave state, where he was engaged in business. Marshall graduated from Dickinson College, located at Carlisle, Pennsylvania in 1848. After graduation Marshall served as adjunct Professor of Ancient Languages at Dickinson College from 1848 to 1850.

Marshall married Jane Stephenson of Carlisle in 1850. Marshall then served as full Professor of Ancient Languages chairmanship from 1850 to 1862. Marshall's nephew was James Pede Marshall. In 1860, according to the U.S. Census, Marshall's household size was six. His occupation was Professor of Languages. He lived in Carlisle and his worth was $13,000 ($314,000.00 in 2020). He was married and had three children.

On March 4, 1861, while he was faculty at Dickinson College, Marshall had to punish two students involved in gunplay. In Carlisle, Dickinson College student William De Vecmom (Class of 1863), was given ten penalty points by the Dickinson College faculty for possession of a firearm, a pistol. Vecmom's fraternity brother, Henry Sherwood (Class of 1864), was also punished by the Dickinson College faculty for handling that pistol "at the same time and immediately after its discharge." De Vecmom later became a lawyer and Sherwood became a printer and served in the Union Army during the Civil War.

== Civil War ==
=== Students demand term to end ===
On April 20, 1861, eight days after the Civil War started, the country was in a "disturbed state". Students from the upper classes at Dickinson college demanded to be tested immediately and that their term to end. However, the Dickinson College faculty in Carlisle, having read the student debates, declined to make a decision on the matter, and the term year ended at its regular date.

=== United States Consul ===
At the outbreak of the Civil War, although a Southerner, Marshall sided with the North. Marshal was appointed United States Consul to Leeds, England by President Abraham Lincoln serving four years from 1861 to 1865.

== Reconstruction ==
=== First Assistant Postmaster General (1869–1874) ===
In 1869 President Ulysses S. Grant appointed Marshall First Assistant Postmaster General to Postmaster John Creswell. Marshall's tenor lasted until 1874. A significant event in 1873, during Marshall's tenor under Postmaster Creswell, was the implementation of postcards by the United States Postal Service.

==== African Americans appointed ====
Marshall worked under Creswell during the Reconstruction Era, a time when former black slaves had received citizenship and voting rights. As a Radical Republican, Postmaster Creswell integrated the Postal Service, and appointed African Americans to serve in every state working in the Postal System. African American postal workers encountered abuse in certain areas of the South. Creswell appointed more African Americans than any of his predecessors.

==== Patronage reduced ====
While Marshall worked under Postmaster Creswell, the U.S. Postal System was full of patronage opportunities, potentially leading to abusive power in making appointments. However, in distributing patronage, Creswell followed the spirit of Civil Service reform and improved the efficiency of the postal service. Creswell was known to have "distributed the enormous patronage of his office with a minimum of friction."

=== U.S. Postmaster-General (1874) ===
In July 1874 President Grant appointed Marshall Postmaster-General serving until the appointment of Marshall Jewell to Postmaster-General in the same year. James Marshall took the place of Postmaster-General John Creswell who had resigned office and was appointed by Grant in 1869. James Marshall served in office until September 1874. Marshall was a Southern cabinet member during Reconstruction.

=== First Assistant Postmaster General (1874–1877) ===
Marshall was reappointed First Assistant Postmaster-General in 1874 after Marshall Jewell was appointed Postmaster-General the same year. James Marshall continued service until 1877 at the close of the Grant Administration. A significant event that took place in 1874 was the creation of the General Postal Union (now Universal Postal Union).

== Later career ==
Marshall was appointed General Superintendent of the Railway Mail Service by Postmaster General Key, a southerner, serving under President Rutherford B. Hayes until Key's tenor ended in 1880. Afterwards Marshall retired from political and public life.

== Death ==
On February 5, 1910, Marshall died in Washington D.C. caused by general debility. Marshall was the third to last surviving cabinet member of President Ulysses S. Grant.

== Legacy ==
Marshall was not known to be associated with any Grant Administration scandals. No book biographies have been written on Marshall. Much of his life outside of the public office is unknown. Overall his legacy is viewed as positive. During his tenor as Assistant Postmaster under Postmaster Cresswell, in 1873, the U.S. Post Office issued its first postcards, to be used in the U.S. Postal System. Postmaster Marshall was one of four Grant cabinet members who survived into the 20th Century. Although Marshall was a Southerner, he worked under Postmaster General Creswell who implemented racial integration into the U.S. Postal System.

== Sources ==
- "James Williams Marshall" (PDF). New York Times. February 6, 1910.
- Rositter Johnson, ed. (1906). Biographical Dictionary of America Marshall, James William. Boston: American Biographical Society.
- "James William Marshall (New York Times)". Dickinson College.
- "Significant Dates". United States Postal Service.
- "Marshall, James William". House Divided: The Civil War Research Engine at Dickinson College.
- Osborne, John. "In Carlisle, Pennsylvania, two Dickinson College students punished for gun play on campus". House Divided: The Civil War Research Engine at Dickinson College.
- Osborne, John. "At Dickinson College, the Junior and Senior classes request the end of term be brought forward". House Divided: The Civil War Research Engine at Dickinson College.
- Friedenberg, Robert V. (Summer 1969). "John A. J. Creswell of Maryland: Reformer in the Post Office". Maryland Historical Magazine. pp. 133–143.

Political offices
| Preceded by John A. J. Creswell | United States Postmaster General; Served under: Ulysses S. Grant; July 3, 1874 – August 24, 1874 | Succeeded by Marshall Jewell |
