= John W. Curry =

- Born: date unknown
- Died: 1899
- Known for: first African-American letter carrier working for the United States Post Office

John W. Curry has been credited as the first African-American letter carrier working for the United States Post Office. He was active in the National Association of Letter Carriers, and his death in 1899 was noted in its magazine, The Postal Record. He was employed in the Washington, DC post office in 1867.

The Washington Bee in 1899 praised him as doing much "to open the way for admission of other colored carriers."
