= 1868 Connecticut gubernatorial election =

- April 6, 1868
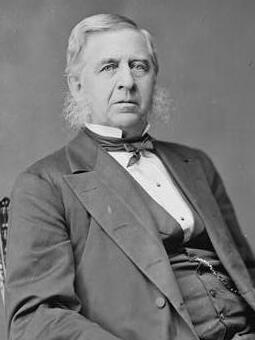

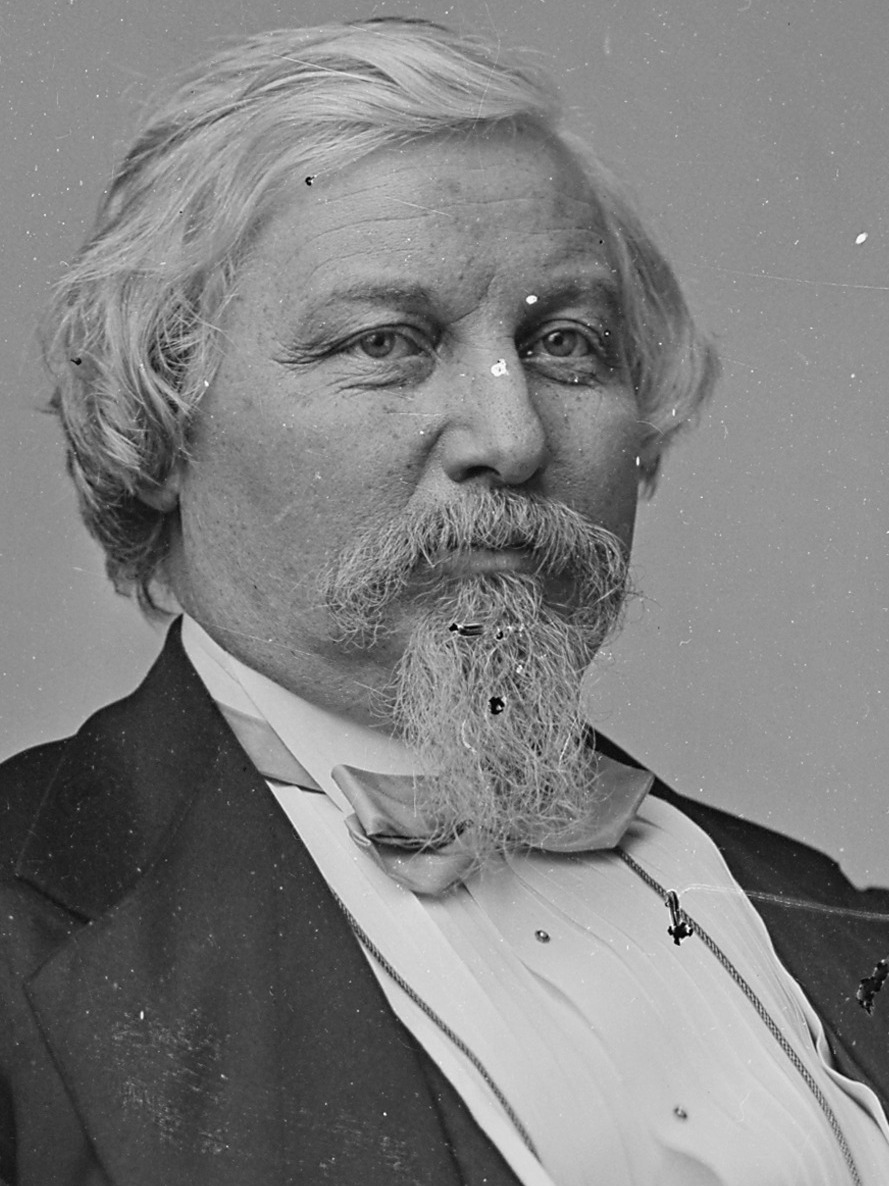
Nominee	James E. English	Marshall Jewell
Party	Democratic	Republican
Popular vote	50,541	48,777
Percentage	50.88%	49.11%
- English: 50–60% 60–70% 70–80% 80–90% Jewell: 50–60% 60–70% 70–80%
Governor before election
James E. English
Democratic
Elected Governor
James E. English
Democratic

The 1868 Connecticut gubernatorial election was held on April 6, 1868. It was the first of four consecutive contests between the same two men. Incumbent governor and Democratic nominee James E. English defeated Republican nominee Marshall Jewell with 50.88% of the vote.

== General election ==
=== Candidates ===
Major party candidates

- James E. English, Democratic
- Marshall Jewell, Republican

=== Results ===
1868 Connecticut gubernatorial election
Party	Candidate	Votes	%	±%
Democratic	James E. English (incumbent)	50,541	50.88%	
Republican	Marshall Jewell	48,777	49.11%	
Other	Others	7	0.01%	
Majority		1,764		
Turnout				
Democratic hold		Swing		
