= John Creswell =

American politician (1828–1891)

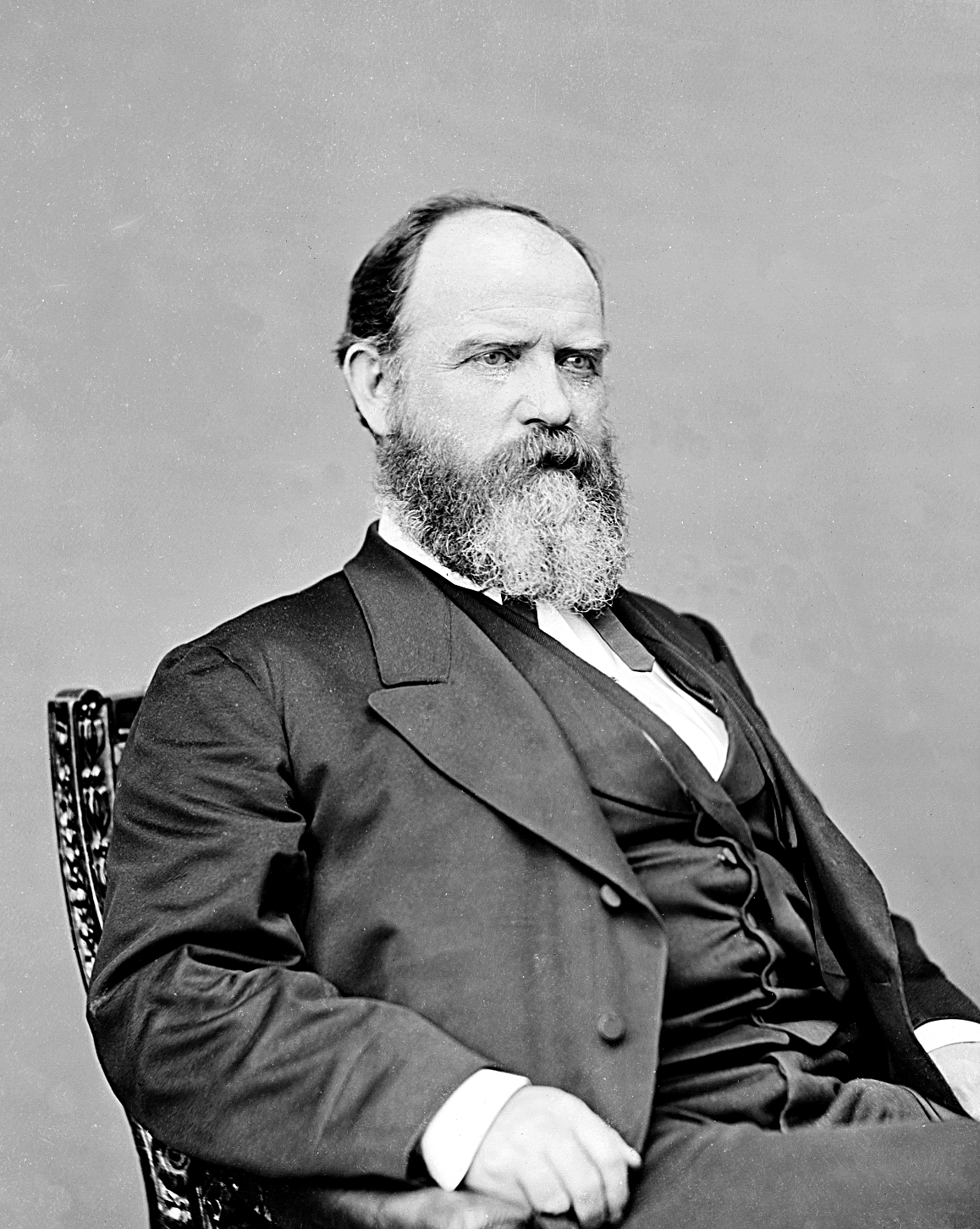
- Creswell, 1860–1875

23rd United States Postmaster General
- In office March 5, 1869 – June 22, 1874
- President: Ulysses S. Grant
- Preceded by: Alexander Randall
- Succeeded by: James William Marshall

United States Senator from Maryland
- In office March 9, 1865 – March 3, 1867
- Preceded by: Thomas Holliday Hicks
- Succeeded by: George Vickers

Member of the U.S. House of Representatives from Maryland's 1st district
- In office March 4, 1863 – March 3, 1865
- Preceded by: John W. Crisfield
- Succeeded by: Hiram McCullough

Member of the Maryland House of Delegates from the Cecil County district
- In office 1861–1862 Serving with Andrew McIntire and Hamilton Morton
- Preceded by: James W. Maxwell, Andrew McIntire, William R. Miller
- Succeeded by: George W. Boulden, William J. Jones, Slater B. Stubbs

Personal details
- Born: John Andrew Jackson Creswell; November 18, 1828 Creswell's Ferry, Maryland, U.S. (now Port Deposit)
- Died: December 23, 1891 (aged 63) Elkton, Maryland, U.S.
- Resting place: Elkton Presbyterian Cemetery
- Party: Republican (1860–1891)
- Other political affiliations: Democratic (1856–1860); Whig (before 1856)
- Spouse: Hannah J. Richardson
- Relatives: Jacob Tome (uncle)
- Education: Dickinson College (BA)

John Andrew Jackson Creswell (November 18, 1828 – December 23, 1891) was an American politician and abolitionist from Maryland, who served as United States Representative, United States Senator, and as Postmaster General of the United States appointed by President Ulysses S. Grant. Creswell is considered to be one of the ablest, if not the best, Postmaster General in United States history. Creswell modernized the U.S. postal system to adapt to an expanding demand for increased postal routes throughout the Western states and remain competitive worldwide. Creswell also integrated the U.S. postal system, appointing both male and female African American postmasters throughout the United States, giving them significant positions of federal authority. Sweeping and constructive reforms of the U.S. postal system took place during Creswell's tenure, including securing fair competition among Star Route carriages, and the abolition of the franking system. Creswell developed a codified classification system of offenses against postal laws. Creswell streamlined and reduced postal costs, making the United States postal system run efficiently creating a fair pricing system domestically, and reducing international mailing prices. Creswell developed and implemented the United States first penny postcard.

After attending a local academy, Creswell graduated from Dickinson College in 1848 and passed the bar in 1850. A former Whig, Creswell joined the Democratic Party and supported James Buchanan for president. When the Civil War broke in 1861, Creswell remained loyal to the Union and supported Abraham Lincoln. Creswell joined the Radical Republicans and supported the civil rights of African Americans and the end of slavery. In 1861, Creswell was elected to represent Cecil County in the Maryland House of Delegates and served until 1862, where he helped keep the state from joining the Confederacy. In 1862 Creswell was elected U.S. Representative and served from 1863 to 1865. Creswell was elected U.S. Senator in 1864 and served from 1865 to 1867. In 1868 Creswell supported Ulysses S. Grant for president. In 1869, President Grant appointed the "gifted and debonair" Creswell as Postmaster General. His appointment by Grant was very popular in Maryland whose citizens considered themselves part of the South. Having retired as Postmaster, Creswell was appointed by President Grant as an Alabama Claims Commissioner and served from 1874 to 1876. Creswell returned to private law practice and worked in the banking industry.

Modern historians, starting in the 1960s and continuing into the 21st century, have taken a renewed interest in Creswell as a forgotten abolitionist and for his appointments and integration of both male and female African Americans to prominent positions in the U.S. postal system, viewing him as "a man of the future".

== Early life ==
John A. J. Creswell was born in Port Deposit, Maryland, then known as Creswells Ferry, on November 18, 1828. His father was John G. Creswell, from Maryland of English ancestry. His mother was Rebecca E. Webb, from Pennsylvania, of German and English ancestry. One of Rebecca's forebears was Quaker missionary, Elizabeth Webb. Creswell attended a local academy before moving on to Dickinson College where he graduated with honors in 1848. He studied law for two years and was admitted to the bar in Baltimore in 1850, commencing practice in Elkton, Maryland.

== Family life ==
During Creswell's early career as a Maryland lawyer, he married Hannah J. Richardson of Maryland. Hannah was considerably wealthy. His uncle was Jacob Tome.

== Political career ==
During the early 1850s, Creswell was a strongly partisan Whig. In 1850, Creswell was an unsuccessful candidate to the Maryland Reform State Convention. When the Whig party ceased to exist in the mid-1850s, Creswell became a Democrat and he attended the 1856 Democratic National Convention in Cincinnati, Ohio that nominated James Buchanan for president.

=== Maryland delegate and the Civil War ===
At the outbreak of the Civil War, Creswell became a devoted and strongly influential Radical Republican. In 1861 Creswell was elected for the first time to public office, as a loyalist Union member of the Maryland House of Delegates. He served until 1862 and worked to prevent Maryland from leaving the Union and joining the Confederate States. In 1863, Creswell was appointed the state's adjutant general, where he was in charge of raising Maryland's quota of troops for the Union war effort.

=== U.S. Representative ===
Creswell was elected to the U.S. House of Representatives in 1862, serving from 1863 to 1865. A staunch supporter of President Abraham Lincoln, Creswell was the first man in Congress to propose a constitutional amendment banning slavery.

=== U.S. Senator ===
Having lost reelection to the House in 1864, Creswell was elected to the U.S. Senate to fill the vacancy caused by the death of Thomas H. Hicks, serving from 1865 until the end of that term in 1867. During his time in the Senate, he served as chairman of the Committee on the Library in the 39th Congress. At the Republican National Convention in 1868, Creswell's name was put forward for either the presidential or vice presidential nominations.

== Postmaster General ==
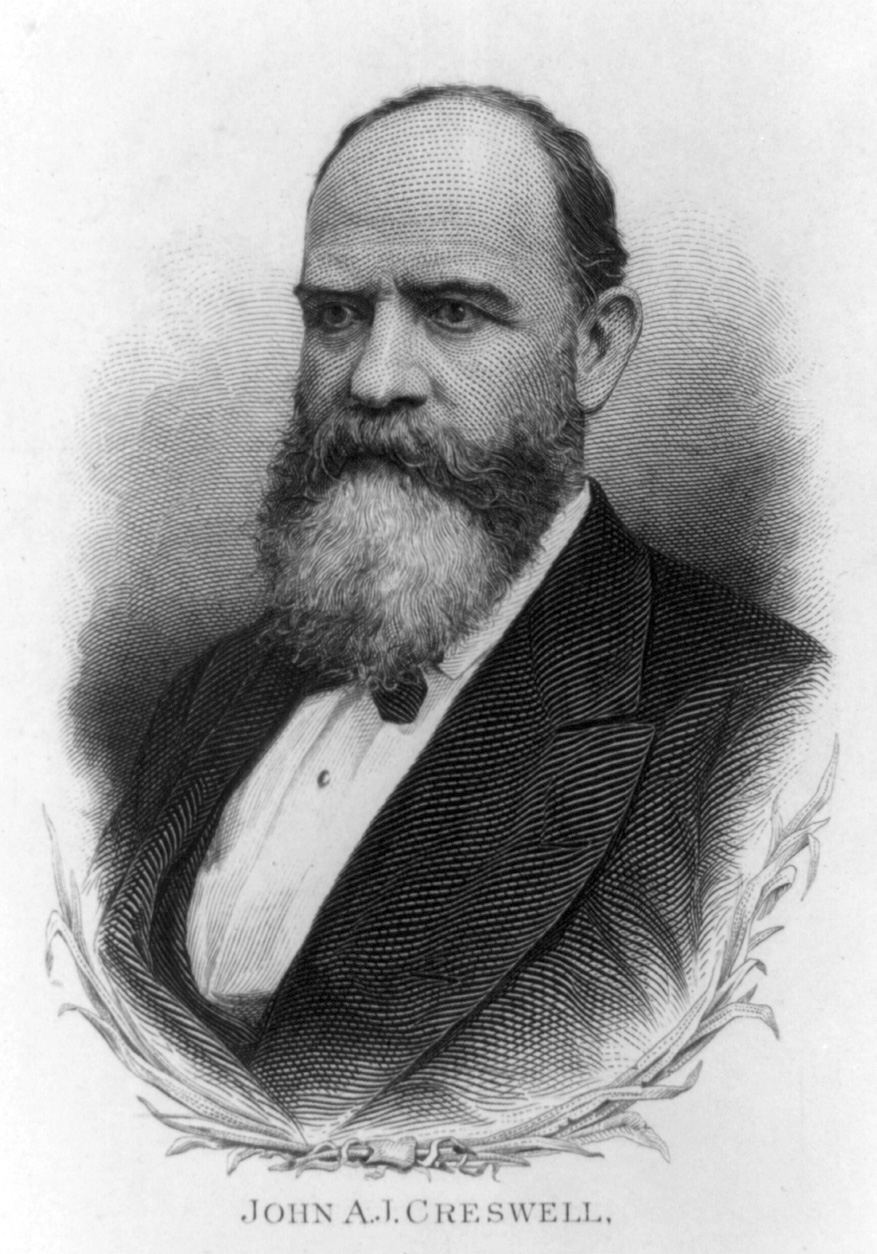
Engraved portrait of Creswell

After Ulysses S. Grant was elected, he appointed Creswell Postmaster General. As Postmaster General, he reorganized the Post Office Department, introduced penny postcards and postal telegraphs, proposed a postal savings system. Creswell proved to be one of the ablest organizers ever to head the Post Office. He cut costs while greatly expanding the number of mail routes, postal clerks and letter carriers. He introduced the penny postcard and worked with Fish to revise postal treaties. A Radical, he used the vast patronage of the post office to support Grant's coalition. He asked for the total abolition of the franking privilege since it reduced the revenue receipts by five percent. The franking privilege allowed members of Congress to send mail at the government's expense. When Creswell suddenly resigned in 1874, historians have speculated this was due to impending scandals that plagued the Grant administration, however, Creswell gave no official reason for his resignation. Fatigue and an important personal matter may have been factors why Creswell resigned.

During the beginning of the Grant administration, it was reported by the New York Times, on 29 July 1869, that Creswell injured himself in Baltimore while on a visit to his father-in-law Rev. James McIntire, near Elton. His left elbow was fractured by a fall from a porch on a chair. Creswell was in deep pain, but the injury was not considered serious and was expected to heal in a few weeks. Creswell said he felt better and he would take a few days off before he returned to Washington.

=== Appointed African Americans and patronage ===
Creswell, as Postmaster-General, had enormous power in distributing patronage nationally in the Postal Service. During Reconstruction as a Radical Republican, Creswell appointed African Americans to serve in every state working in the Postal System. African American postal workers encountered abuse in certain areas of the South. Creswell appointed more African Americans than any of his predecessors. In distributing patronage Creswell followed the spirit of Civil Service reform and improved the efficiency of the postal service. Creswell was known to have "distributed the enormous patronage of his office with a minimum of friction."

Prior to 1865, African Americans were banned from working in the Postal Department, mostly due to the Southern racism of not allowing blacks to handle the mail. At the end of the Civil War this restriction was lifted, but white postmasters in major cities around the nation only appointed a few African American clerks. Immediately when Creswell took office the conservative policy of appointing only white postmasters ended. When black applicants overcame the difficulty of posting a bond, Creswell began to appoint black postmasters across the country, including the South. One black postmaster, Charles Miller, received as hostile reception among white conservative society in Columbia, South Carolina in 1869. On November 15, 1872 Creswell appointed Mrs. Anna M. Dumas the first female African American postmaster in Covington, Louisiana. Creswell ended the policy of whites only mail carriers and appointed James Christian of Richmond, Virginia, the first black mail carrier, on June 1, 1869. Five months later Creswell appointed black Union veteran and first Medal of Honor hero, William Carney, letter carrier of Bedford, Massachusetts. On April 20, 1870 Creswell appointed John W. Curry Washington D.C.'s first black postman. Creswell also appointed Isaac Myers of Baltimore the first African American postal inspector.

=== General Tate conversation (1870) ===
President Grant, at the beginning of his first term in office, initiated an attempt to annex the Dominican Republic, then known as Santo Domingo. President Grant believed that the annexation and eventual statehood of the island country would add to American mineral resources and serve as a refuge for African Americans, who were harassed by violence from the Ku Klux Klan. At a White House reception on January 1, 1870, African Haitian minister, General Alexander Tate, attended. President Grant, who had no racial animosity, cordially shook General Tate's hand. Other white dignitaries refused to associate with General Tate because he was black and ignored him at the reception. Postmaster Creswell, however, noticed that General Tate was being snubbed, and went over and had a pleasant conversation with him.

=== Attempt to remove Creswell (1870) ===
Upon assuming office, Postmaster Creswell strongly advocated the abolishment of the franking privilege that allowed Congress, both the Senate and the House of Representatives, to use the U.S. Postal Service paid for by taxpayers. Many in Congress, during November 1870, opposed the removal of this privilege, and friends of President Grant extensively lobbied that Creswell to be removed from office and replaced by Pennsylvanian, John W. Forney. This was done in part to having a Pennsylvanian on the Presidential cabinet so President Grant could freely choose a Revenue Commissioner. President Grant, however, resisted this pressure and kept Creswell in office.

=== Congressional franking privilege abolished (1873) ===
On January 28, 1873, President Ulysses S. Grant signed into law the abolition of the Congressional franking privilege. Previously, on January 27, 1873, the U.S. Senate bill, with amendments, to abolish the franking privilege, had been introduced by New Jersey Representative John Hill to vote on by the House of Representatives. Many Representatives in the House attempted by an amendment to make the franking abolition legislature less sweeping, however, these efforts failed. The stronger franking abolition bill passed the House by a vote of 143 to 48. Those who voted against the franking abolition were divided equally among both Republicans and Democrats, mostly from the Southern states. A bill to cut spending on Public Printing was introduced to the House, however, this failed to gain a two-thirds majority to pass. The abolition of the franking privilege would be effective on July 1, 1873. On February 26, 1873 Postmaster Creswell went before the House Committee on Appropriations and testified that federal postage appropriations were necessary for the U.S. Treasury and the Postal Department, after the abolishment of the franking took effect. Federal executive departments were exempt from the law.

=== Proposed check payable bill (1874) ===
By law, to secure a postal contract, bidders had to pay a 5% guarantee check at a national bank payable to the Postmaster General. Some bidders, however, in good faith, were only writing "John Creswell" or "John A. Creswell" rather than "John A.J. Creswell, Postmaster General" on their deposit checks. This was brought to the attention of Postmaster Creswell by California U.S. Representative John K. Luttrell. Pacific Coast mail routes would be effected without the proper format. On February 8, 1874, in order to solve the problem, Postmaster Creswell wrote a bill to Congress that required the correct "Postmaster General" format be put on all postal route guarantee checks. On February 9, Representative Luttrell promptly submitted the bill written by Postmaster Creswell to the House for ratification.

== Alabama claims commissioner ==
Creswell accepted the appointment of a United States counsel before the Alabama Claims Commission; he served in that position from 1874 to 1876.

== Legal and banking career ==
Creswell resumed practicing law and served as the president of two banks.

== Death ==
Creswell died suddenly at noon at his home a mile outside of Elkton, Cecil County, Maryland, on December 23, 1891. His wife and the Presbyterian minister, Rev. Dr. Osmond, were with Creswell when he died. Creswell had contracted the flu and then succumbed to pneumonia. For the past several years Creswell had been in poor health having a heart condition. Seven other Marylanders during the last previous ten days had died of the flu and pneumonia. Creswell was interred in Elkton Presbyterian Cemetery. In April 1892, his extensive law library was put up for auction by Latimer & Sloan, Auctioneers in Washington, D.C.

== Historical reputation ==
Historians view Creswell as a forgotten "committed abolitionist" and have taken renewed interest for Creswell's support of the Thirteenth Amendment ending slavery for African Americans in the United States, as a member of the House of Representatives, and for his advancement of African Americans, both male and female, in the Postal Service, while serving as President Grant's appointed Postmaster General during that latter half of Reconstruction. The mistake of his name "Angel James" from his correct name "Andrew Jackson" may have "originated in the late nineteenth century, possibly when his papers were processed by the Library of Congress." According to historians John M. Osborne and Christine Bombaro, both of Dickinson College, Creswell "left few records of his personal life. There is no autobiography, diary, or memoir to be found beyond a brief and incomplete biographical sketch he wrote in November 1863, presumably for the United States Congressional Directory."

Professor Matthew Pinsker, also of Dickinson College, said "[w]hile serving as a Postmaster General during the Grant Administration, Creswell helped to integrate and modernize the federal post office system. He had truly become a man of the future." Born a Southerner, Creswell became "an unlikely advocate for equality of opportunity." Historian Ronald C. White said Creswell was a "highly competent lawyer" and "had ideas on how to reform the Post Office Department." White noted that Postmaster Creswell received "strong commendations" for introducing reforms, including expanding the Western mail service, instituting fair competition on carriage routes for mail transportation, a system previously riddled with bribery, and for strongly advocating the abolishment of the franking privilege system, all of these efforts endorsed by President Grant.

Osborne and Bombaro concluded that Creswell was "a true Border State pragmatist who came to embrace what were at the time considered radical ideas about abolishing slavery and promoting equality. He came late to these ideas of 'freedom national,' but when he joined the movement, he was as ardent as any of its adherents. Creswell could be ambitious and opportunistic, but he could also stand firmly for important values."

== Memorials ==
John Creswell is the namesake of Creswell, North Carolina, and Creswell, Oregon.

An inscription on Creswell's enormous and elaborate granite monument located at Elkton Presbyterian Church Cemetery on Creswell's family plot reads:

Lawyer, orator, statesman, patriot, member of the Bar of Cecil County and of the Court of Appeals of Maryland and of the Bar of the Supreme Court of the United States. Adjutant General of Maryland in the Civil War. Member of the House of Representatives and of the Senate of the United States.

Postmaster General in the Cabinet of President Grant. Eloquent defender of the Union. Faithful to every trust. Loyal to every friend. Generous to every cause. A wise Counsellor, an able advocate.

His career was an honor to the county which gave him birth and to his state. He was dignified in demeanor, commanding in person, courtly in manner. Fearless in defence of the right, upright in his dealings with his fellow men. Exemplary in his domestic life, pure in morals. Faithful in religious duties. Generous but unostentatious in charity.

== Sources ==
- Brands, H. W. (2012). The Man Who Saved the Union: Ulysses S. Grant in War and Peace. New York: Doubleday. ISBN 978-0-385-53241-9.
- Creswell Credited With Keeping State From Seceding From Union - Delmarva Heritage Series
- Friedenberg, Robert V. (Summer 1969). "John A. J. Creswell of Maryland: Reformer in the Post Office". Maryland Historical Magazine. pp. 133–143.
- McFeely, William S. (1981). Grant: A Biography. Norton. ISBN 0-393-01372-3.
- Moore, Beth Boulden (May 27, 2017). "Elkton Presbyterian Church Cemetery: A who's who of local history". Cecil Whig. cecildaily.com.
- Osborne, John M.; Bombaro, Christine (2015). "Forgotten Abolitionist: John A. J. Creswell of Maryland". SmashWords (PDF). Carlisle, PA: Dickinson College.
- Smith, Jean Edward (2001). Grant. New York: Simon & Schuster. ISBN 0-684-84927-5.
- "The Accident to Postmaster-General Creswell" (PDF). July 29, 1869.
- United States Congress. "John Creswell (id: C000904)". Biographical Directory of the United States Congress.
- White, Ronald C. (2016). American Ulysses: A Life of Ulysses S. Grant. Random House Publishing Group. ISBN 978-1-5883-6992-5.

U.S. House of Representatives
Preceded by John W. Crisfield	Member of the U.S. House of Representatives from Maryland's 1st congressional district March 4, 1863 – March 3, 1865	Succeeded by Hiram McCullough
U.S. Senate
Preceded by Thomas H. Hicks	U.S. senator (Class 3) from Maryland; March 9, 1865 – March 3, 1867; Served alongside: Reverdy Johnson	Succeeded by George Vickers
Political offices
Preceded by Alexander W. Randall	United States Postmaster General; Served under: Ulysses S. Grant; March 5, 1869 – June 22, 1874	Succeeded by James W. Marshall
