= Francis Wayland III =

American politician

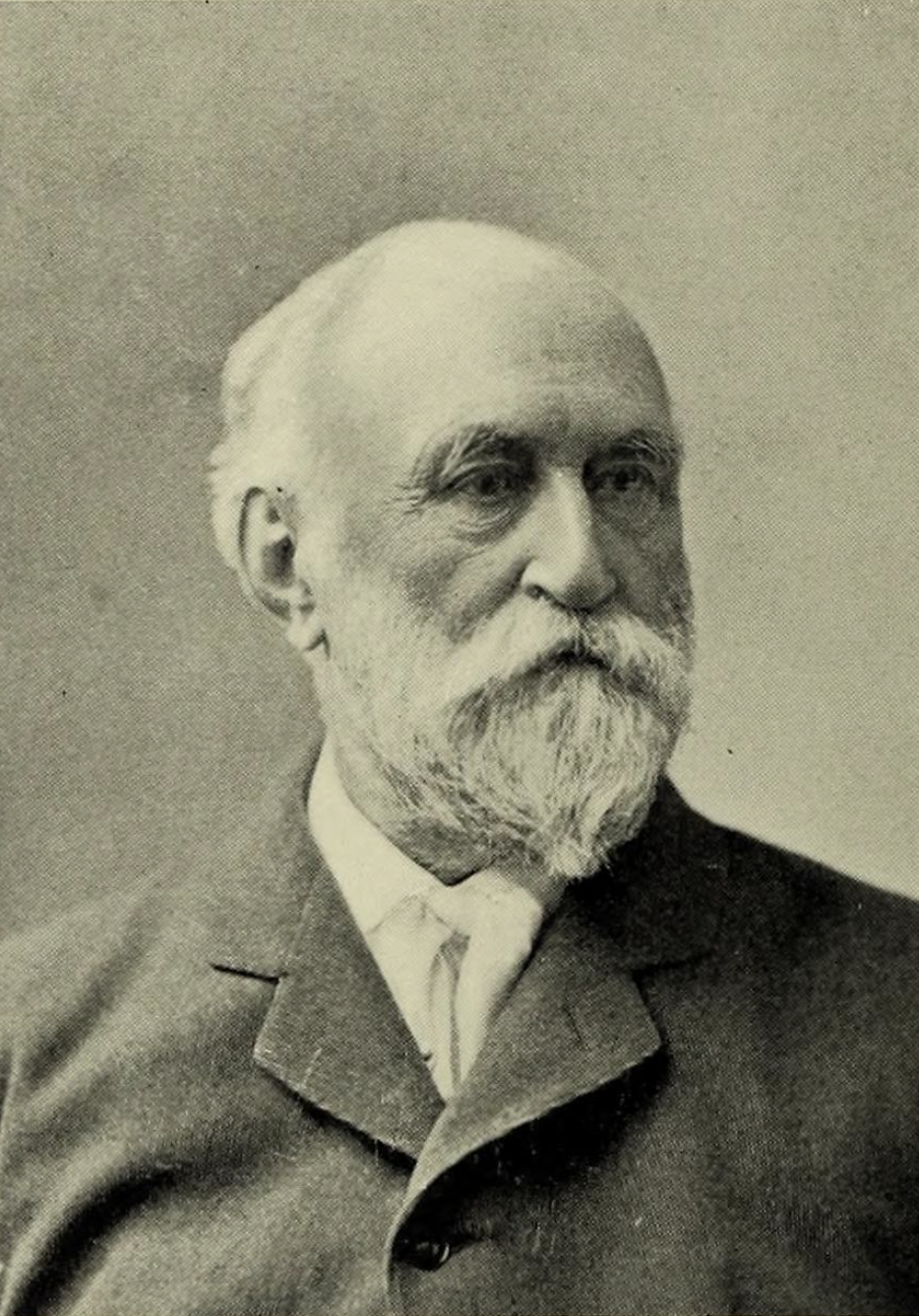

1st Dean of Yale Law School
- In office 1873–1903
- Preceded by: Position created
- Succeeded by: Henry Wade Rogers

54th Lieutenant Governor of Connecticut
- In office May 5, 1869 – May 4, 1870
- Governor: Marshall Jewell
- Preceded by: Ephraim H. Hyde
- Succeeded by: Julius Hotchkiss

Personal details
- Born: August 23, 1826 Boston, Massachusetts, U.S.
- Died: January 9, 1904 (aged 78) New Haven, Connecticut, U.S.
- Party: Republican
- Parent: Francis Wayland (father)
- Education: Brown University (AB); Harvard Law School

Francis Wayland III (August 23, 1826 – January 9, 1904) was an American lawyer and politician who served as the first dean of Yale Law School and 54th lieutenant governor of Connecticut.

== Early life and education ==
Wayland was born in Boston, the son of Francis Wayland. He earned a Bachelor of Arts degree from Brown University in 1846 and studied law at Harvard Law School.

== Career ==
Wayland became probate judge in Connecticut in 1864 and was the 54th lieutenant governor of Connecticut in 1869–1870. In 1872, he became a professor in the Yale Law School, of which he was dean from 1873 to 1903.

Political offices
Preceded by Ephraim H. Hyde	Lieutenant Governor of Connecticut; 1869–1870	Succeeded by Julius Hotchkiss
Academic offices
Preceded by none	Dean of Yale Law School; 1873 – 1903	Succeeded by Henry Wade Rogers
