= Ephraim H. Hyde =

American politician

53rd Lieutenant Governor of Connecticut
- In office May 1, 1867 – May 5, 1869
- Governor: James E. English
- Preceded by: Oliver Winchester
- Succeeded by: Francis Wayland III

President Pro Tempore of the Connecticut Senate
- In office 1876–1877
- Preceded by: Caleb B. Bowers
- Succeeded by: Oliver Hoyt

Personal details
- Born: June 1, 1812 Stafford, Connecticut, U.S.
- Died: June 18, 1896 (aged 84) Stafford, Connecticut, U.S.
- Resting place: Stafford, Connecticut
- Party: Democratic
- Spouses: Hannah Converse Young (m. 1836; died 1862) Mary S. Williams (m. 1869)

Ephraim H. Hyde (June 1, 1812 – June 18, 1896) was an American politician who was the 53rd Lieutenant Governor of Connecticut from 1867 to 1869. He previously served as President pro tempore of the Connecticut Senate.

A noted agricultural scientist, breeder of pureblood Devon cattle, school and prison reformer. Born, lived and died at Stafford, Connecticut.

== Education ==
Attendance at the district school in his native town, and about six weeks of study at the academy in Monson, Mass., comprised his entire school education. His boyhood was passed in the manner common to the boys of that time; work on the farm, accompanied by general service in an old-time hotel connected with the farm and known as the half-way stage station between Worcester and Hartford, and about four months as a stage driver between Stafford and Sturbridge, filled up the years between school and the commencement of his active business life.

== Early business life ==
He was interested in a blast furnace business for about eight years; in his twenty-ninth year he was the chief promoter of a cotton mill at Stafford Springs; he was for many years interested in the business of manufacturing satinets, as one of the firm of Converse & Hyde; and he was engaged in many other industrial enterprises.

== Stock breeding ==
His energies were devoted principally to breeding blooded stock. About the year 1842, having become the owner of two or three large farms, he commenced the careful breeding of stock from imported and native cattle, and thus entered upon a course that was to make his name familiar as a household word to the leading agriculturists throughout the country.

He began with Devons, and afterwards experimented with Ayrshires, Durhams, and Jerseys; but believing the Devons to be the best adapted to this part of the country, he applied himself to the scientific selection and breeding of that class, and as a result he greatly improved the stock and produced herds of rare beauty and excellence, the winners of many a sweepstake medal and prize.

Animals from his herds went out to all parts of the country, and the improvement of the stock in his native state was credited in a large measure to his care and wisdom as a breeder of pure-blooded Devons.

== Agricultural societies ==
Largely due to his influence and enterprise the Tolland County Agricultural Society was organized in 1852. Ephrain Hyde was its president from its organization to 1860, and again from 1864 to 1868. He was president of the Connecticut State Agricultural Society from 1858 to 1881, vice president of the New England Agricultural Society from its beginning in 1864, vice president of the State Board of Agriculture from its organization in 1866 to 1882; and was chosen again in 1890; chairman of the commissioners on diseases of domestic animals for over thirty years; president of the American Breeders' Association from 1865 until it resolved itself into sections for each breed; president of the Connecticut Valley Agricultural Association, comprising Connecticut, Massachusetts, New Hampshire, and Vermont; incorporator of the Connecticut Stock Breeders' Association; vice president of the Dairyman's Association; chairman of the committee to publish the first volume of the American Herd Book; president of the Tolland County East Agricultural Society from its organization in 1870 to 1876; and one of the trustees and vice president of the Storrs School.

== Storrs School (now the University of Connecticut) ==
Hyde long favored a school in which the science of agriculture would be taught, and he was one of the first two persons who consulted the Storrs brothers in regard to the project of establishing such a school. Their scheme met his approval; and that the plan was finally adopted, and that the school was able to maintain itself against the numerous attacks that have been made upon it by friends and foes alike, was largely owing to his indefatigable efforts and earnest support. At a meeting of the trustees in 1889 he was chosen one of the building committee to erect the beautiful and commodious structures which have been completed at about the estimated cost of $50,000.

== Prisoner's Friend Association ==
Hyde's labors to secure reform in the management of prisons and houses of correction were extensive and persistent. In 1845, he was one of the founders and directors of the Prisoner's Friend Association; later he was a director, also, of the Industrial School for Girls; and has been more or less active in the direction of the state board of education, especially in 1867, 1868, and 1869.

== Political offices ==
Hyde was county commissioner for Tolland County 1842–1843; member of the house of representatives from Stafford 1851-1852; and delegate to the Democratic National Convention at Baltimore in 1860. He was a state senator and president pro tem of the Connecticut state senate in 1876-1877, and Lieutenant Governor of Connecticut 1867-1869.

== Family ==
Ephraim Hyde married, first, Hannah Converse Young, September 27, 1836. Six children were born to them, three of whom died in infancy, another at the age of four years; the other two were Ellen E., wife of Ernest Cady, of the Pratt & Cady Company of Hartford, and E. H. Hyde, Jr., of the firm of Hyde & Joslyn, Hartford.

His first wife died February 26, 1862, and, on October 19, 1869, he married Miss Mary S. Williams of Hartford, who survived him.

== Religion ==
Hyde took an efficient and active interest in the Universalist Society of Stafford, serving therein as sexton, organist, and leader of the choir for fifteen years.

Political offices
Preceded by Oliver F. Winchester	Lieutenant Governor of Connecticut; 1867–1869	Succeeded by Francis Wayland III
