= List of elections in 1812 =

The following elections occurred in the year 1812.

== Europe ==
- 1812 United Kingdom general election

== North America ==
=== United States ===
- 1812 United States elections
- 1812 United States presidential election

==== United States lieutenant gubernatorial ====
- 1812 Connecticut lieutenant gubernatorial election

==== United States gubernatorial ====
- 1812 Connecticut gubernatorial election
- 1812 Kentucky gubernatorial election
- 1812 Louisiana gubernatorial election
- 1812 Maryland gubernatorial election
- 1812 Massachusetts gubernatorial election
- 1812 New Hampshire gubernatorial election
- 1812 New Jersey gubernatorial election
- 1812 North Carolina gubernatorial election
- 1812 Ohio gubernatorial election
- 1812 Rhode Island gubernatorial election
- 1812 South Carolina gubernatorial election
- 1812 Vermont gubernatorial election
- 1812 Virginia gubernatorial election
- 1812 Virginia gubernatorial special election

==== United States Senate ====
- 1812 and 1813 United States Senate elections
- 1812 United States Senate election in Pennsylvania

==== United States House of Representatives ====
- 1812 and 1813 United States House of Representatives elections
- 1812 United States House of Representatives election in Delaware
- 1812 United States House of Representatives election in Georgia
- 1812 Georgia's at-large congressional district special election
- 1812 United States House of Representatives election in Illinois Territory
- 1812 United States House of Representatives elections in Kentucky
- 1812 United States House of Representatives election in Louisiana
- 1812 United States House of Representatives elections in Maryland
- 1812 United States House of Representatives elections in Massachusetts
- 1812 Massachusetts's 17th congressional district special election
- 1812 United States House of Representatives election in Missouri Territory
- 1812 United States House of Representatives election in New Hampshire
- 1812 United States House of Representatives election in New Jersey
- 1812 United States House of Representatives elections in New York
- 1812 New York's 6th congressional district special election
- 1812 United States House of Representatives elections in North Carolina
- 1812 United States House of Representatives elections in Ohio
- 1812 United States House of Representatives elections in Pennsylvania
- 1812 United States House of Representatives elections in Pennsylvania
- 1812 United States House of Representatives elections in South Carolina
- 1812 United States House of Representatives election in Vermont

== See also ==
- Category:1812 elections
