= 1811 Connecticut lieutenant gubernatorial election =

- April 8, 1811

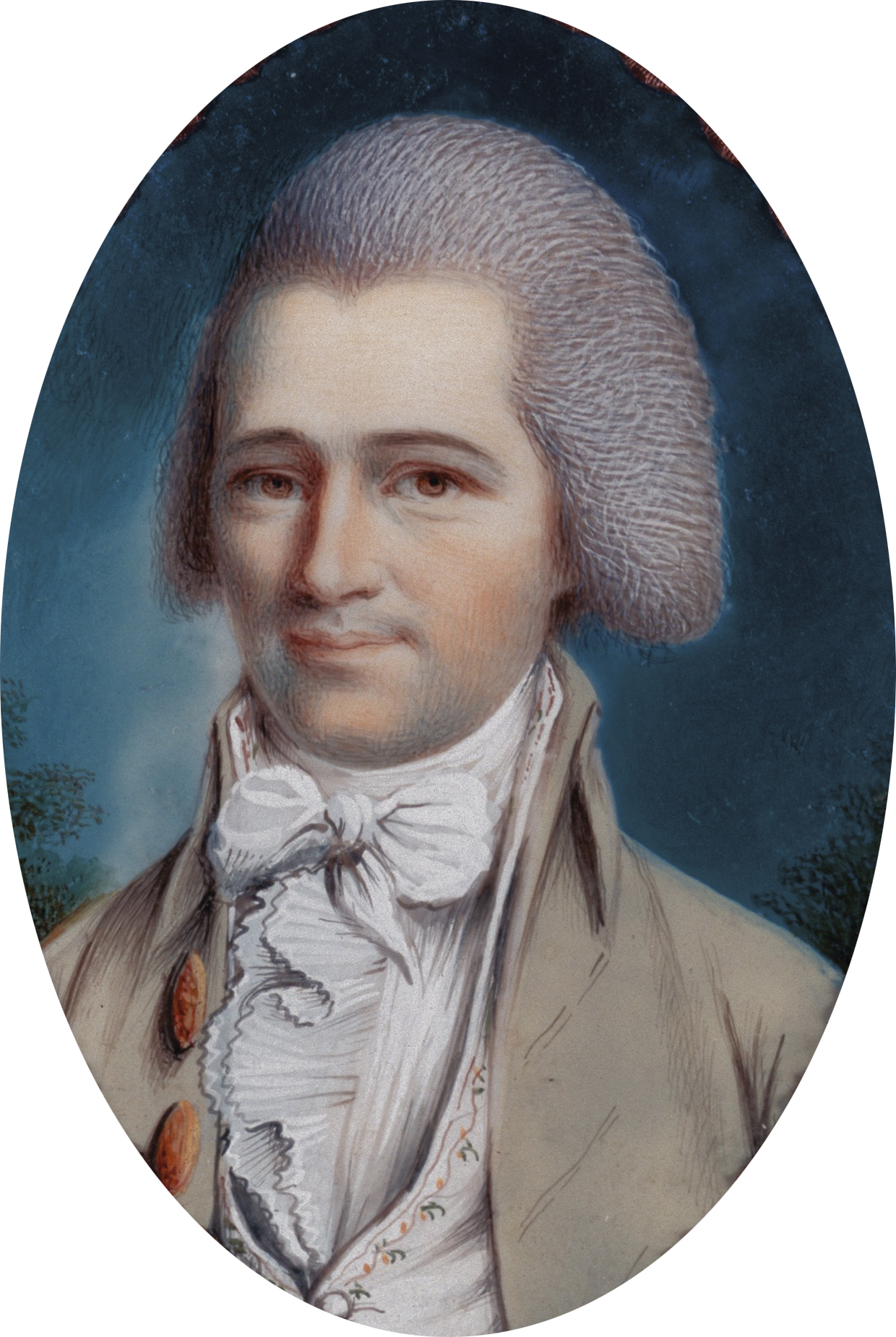

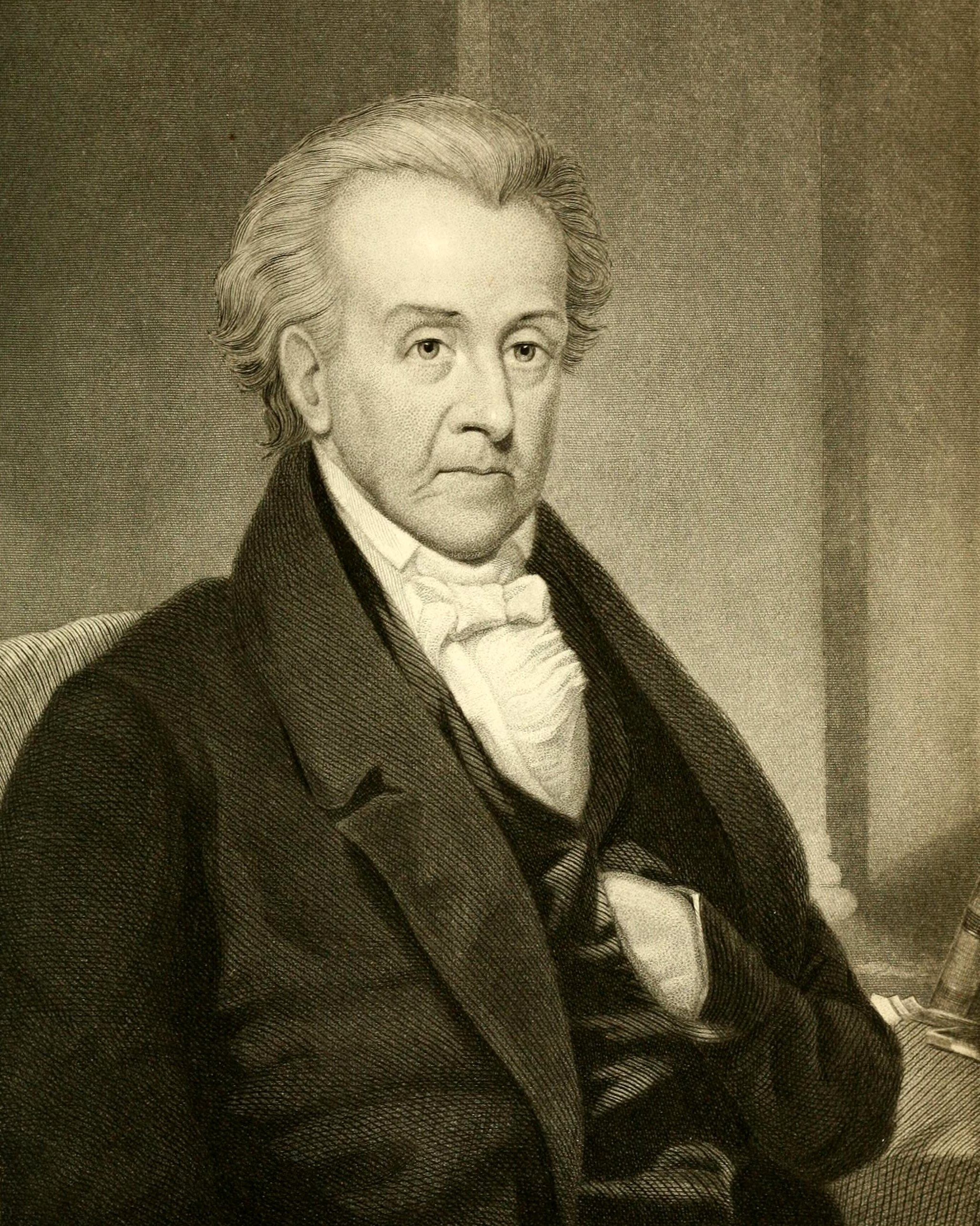
Nominee	Roger Griswold	Elijah Boardman	John Cotton Smith
Party	Federalist	Democratic-Republican	Federalist
Popular vote	7,404	5,966	1,789
Percentage	47.30%	38.10%	11.40%
Lieutenant Governor before election
Roger Griswold
Federalist
Elected Lieutenant Governor
John Cotton Smith
Federalist

The 1811 Connecticut lieutenant gubernatorial election was held on April 8, 1811, in order to elect the lieutenant governor of Connecticut. Incumbent Federalist lieutenant governor Roger Griswold received a plurality of the votes against Democratic-Republican candidate Elijah Boardman and Federalist candidate and former member of the U.S. House of Representatives from Connecticut's at-large district John Cotton Smith in a rematch of the previous year's election. However, since no candidate received a majority in the popular vote, John Cotton Smith was elected by the Connecticut General Assembly per the Connecticut Charter of 1662.

== General election ==
On election day, April 8, 1811, incumbent Federalist lieutenant governor Roger Griswold won a plurality of the vote by a margin of 1,438 votes against his foremost opponent Democratic-Republican candidate Elijah Boardman. However, as no candidate received a majority of the vote, the election was forwarded to the Connecticut General Assembly.

=== Results ===
Connecticut lieutenant gubernatorial election, 1811
Party	Candidate	Votes	%
Federalist	Roger Griswold (incumbent)	7,404	47.30
Democratic-Republican	Elijah Boardman	5,966	38.10
Federalist	John Cotton Smith	1,789	11.40
	Scattering	490	3.20
Total votes		15,649	100.00
Federalist hold			

== Legislative election ==
As no candidate received a majority of the vote, the Connecticut General Assembly was required to decide the election. Incumbent Federalist lieutenant governor and winner of the popular vote Roger Griswold, was elected governor on the same day as the lieutenant gubernatorial election and therefor became ineligible to be elected lieutenant governor of Connecticut in the legislative vote. Federalist candidate John Cotton Smith was ultimately elected by the Connecticut General Assembly, thereby retaining Federalist control over the office of lieutenant governor. Smith was sworn in for his first term on May 9, 1811.

=== Results ===
Connecticut House of Representatives election
Party	Candidate	Votes	%
Federalist	John Cotton Smith	105	55.90%
Democratic-Republican	Elijah Boardman	60	31.90%
Federalist	Chauncey Goodrich	15	8.00%
Federalist	John Treadwell	8	4.20%
Total votes		188	100.00%
Federalist hold			
