= 1815 Connecticut gubernatorial election =

- April 10, 1815
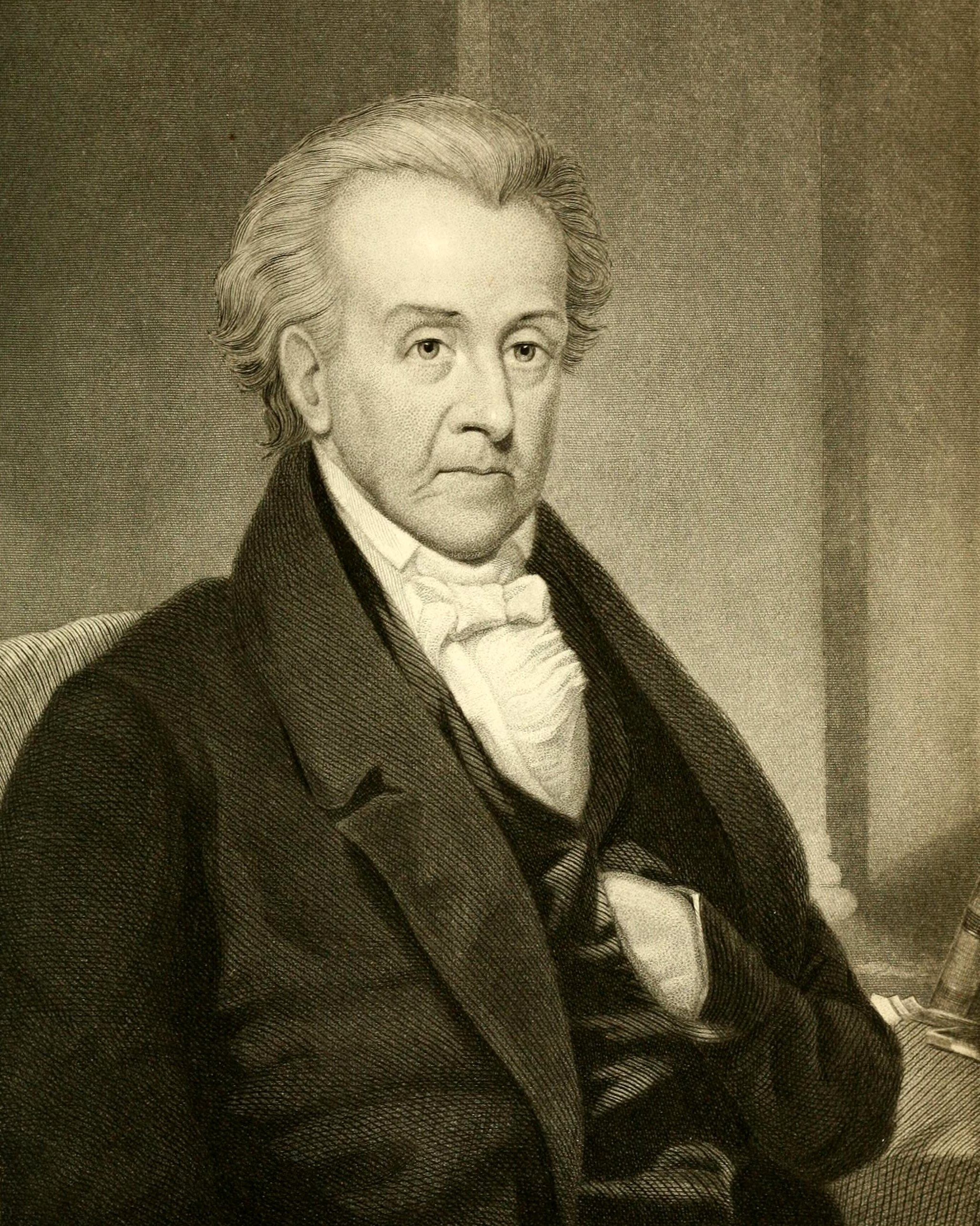

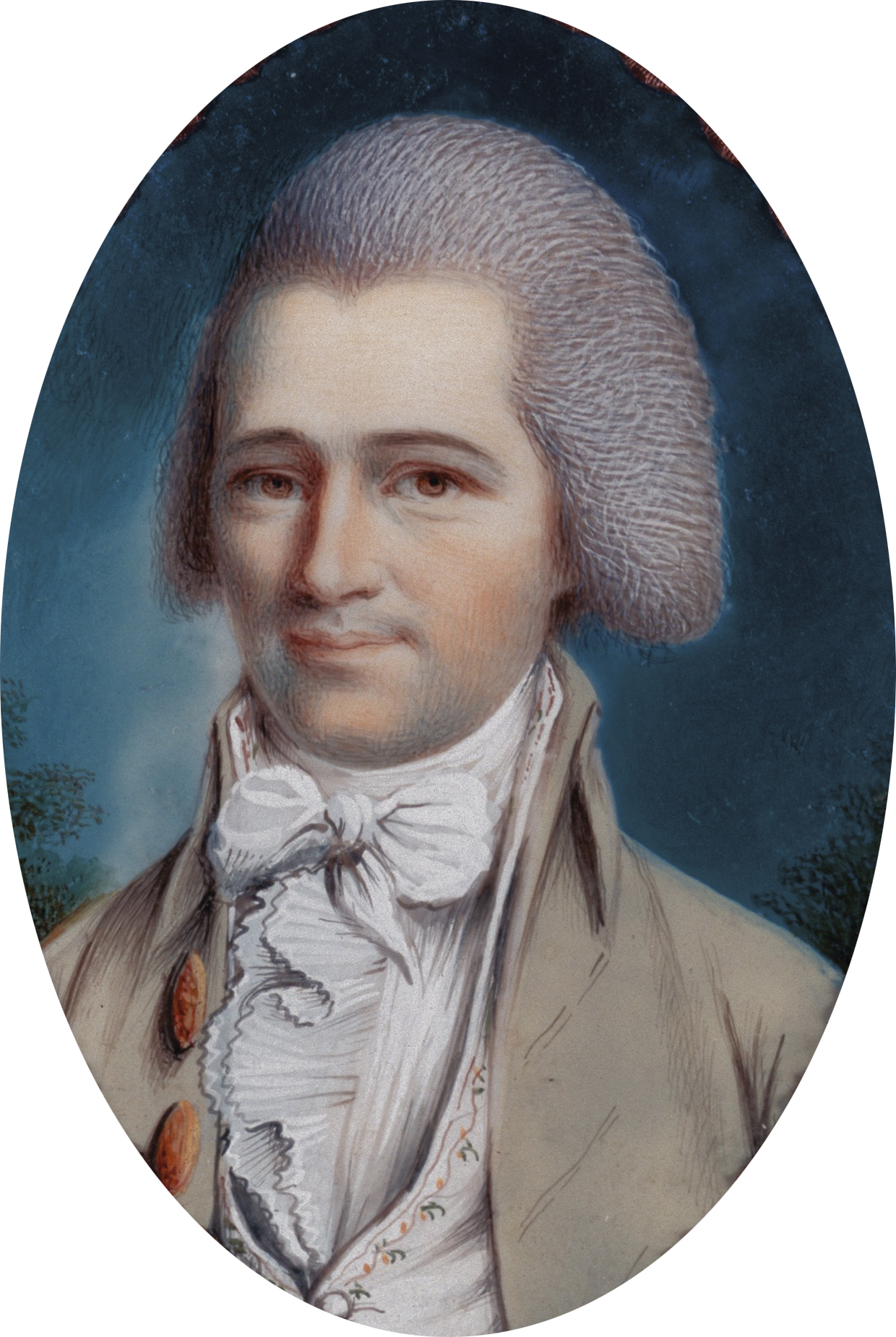
Nominee	John Cotton Smith	Elijah Boardman
Party	Federalist	Democratic-Republican
Popular vote	8,176	4,876
Percentage	59.27%	35.35%
- County results Smith: 50–60% 70–80% 80–90% Boardman: 50–60% 60–70% No data
Governor before election
John Cotton Smith
Federalist
Elected Governor
John Cotton Smith
Federalist

The 1815 Connecticut gubernatorial election took place on April 10, 1815.

Incumbent Federalist Governor John Cotton Smith defeated Democratic-Republican nominee Elijah Boardman in a re-match of the previous year's election.

== General election ==
=== Candidates ===
- Elijah Boardman, Democratic-Republican, former member of the Connecticut House of Representatives, Democratic-Republican nominee for governor in 1812, 1813 and 1814
- John Cotton Smith, Federalist, incumbent governor

=== Results ===
1815 Connecticut gubernatorial election
Party	Candidate	Votes	%	±%
Federalist	John Cotton Smith (incumbent)	8,176	59.27%	
Democratic-Republican	Elijah Boardman	4,876	35.35%	
Scattering		742	5.38%	
Majority		3,300	23.92%	
Turnout		13,794		
Federalist hold		Swing		
