= 1810 Connecticut lieutenant gubernatorial election =

- April 9, 1810

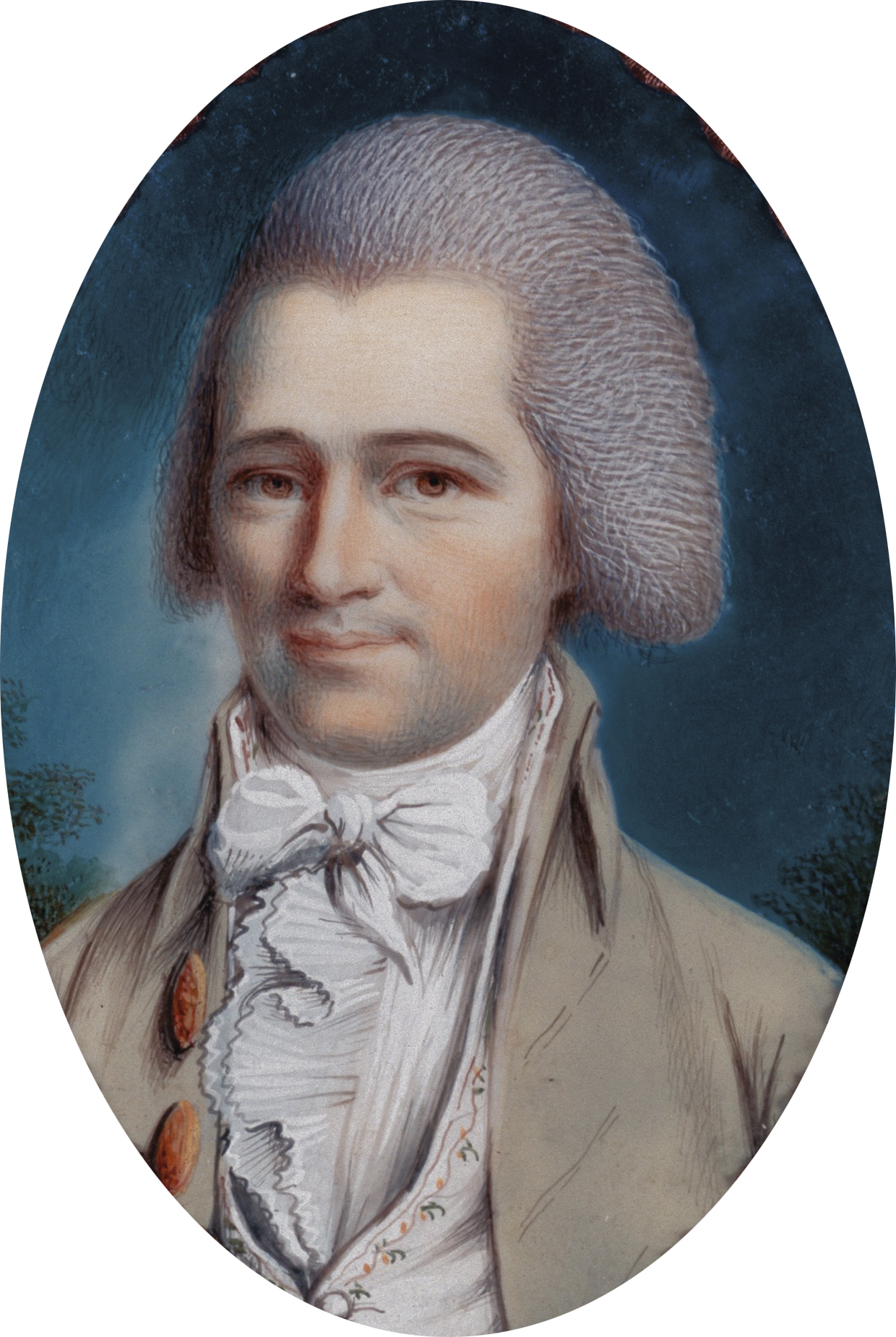

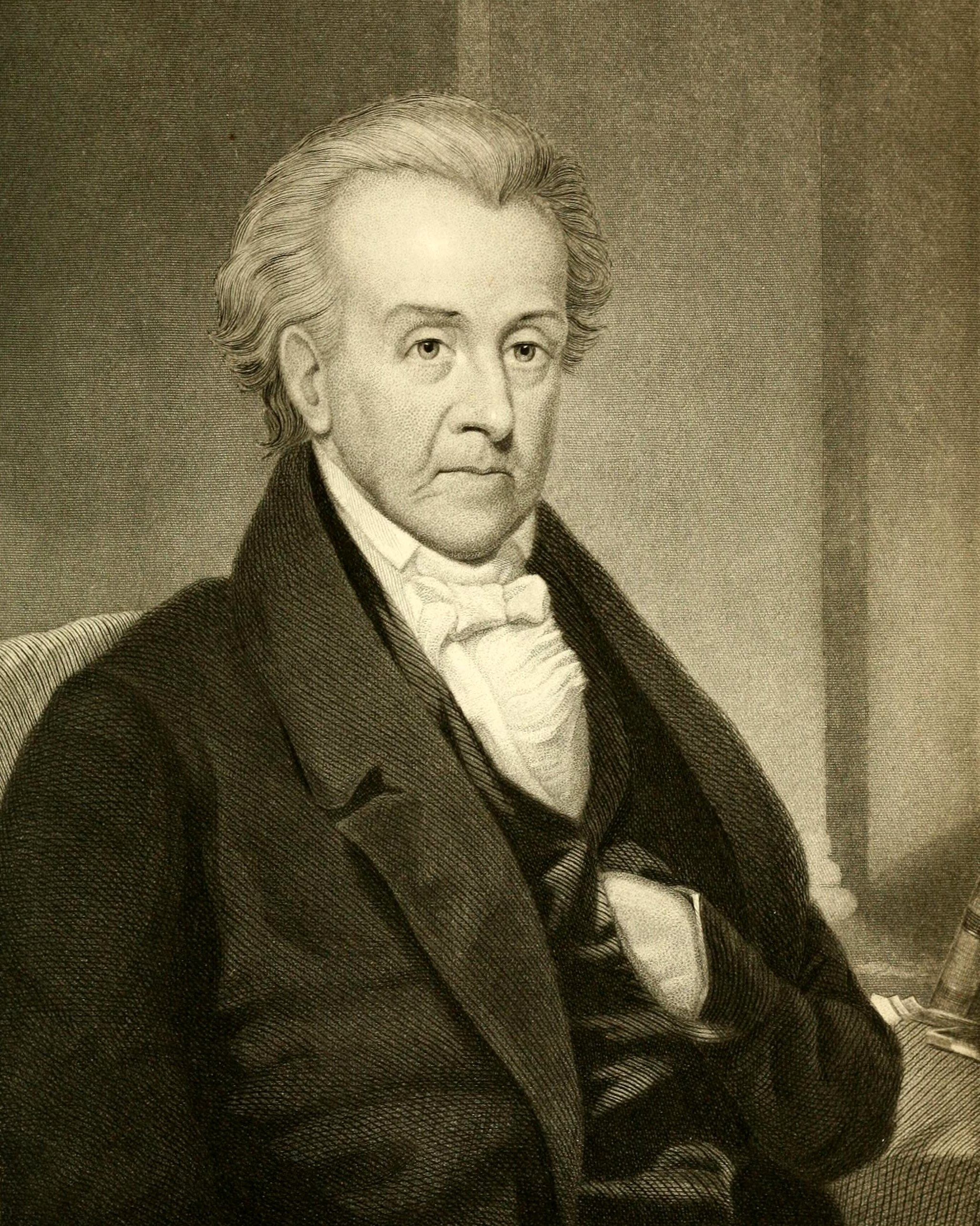
Nominee	Roger Griswold	Elijah Boardman	John Cotton Smith
Party	Federalist	Democratic-Republican	Federalist
Popular vote	9,009	6,358	1,419
Percentage	51.10%	36.00%	8.00%
Lieutenant Governor before election
Roger Griswold (Note: Appointed October 20, 1809.)
Federalist
Elected Lieutenant Governor
Roger Griswold
Federalist

The 1810 Connecticut lieutenant gubernatorial election was held on April 9, 1810, in order to elect the lieutenant governor of Connecticut. Incumbent Federalist lieutenant governor Roger Griswold defeated Democratic-Republican candidate Elijah Boardman and Federalist candidate and former member of the U.S. House of Representatives from Connecticut's at-large district John Cotton Smith.

== General election ==
On election day, April 9, 1810, incumbent Federalist lieutenant governor Roger Griswold won the election by a margin of 2,651 votes against his foremost opponent Democratic-Republican candidate Elijah Boardman, thereby retaining Federalist control over the office of lieutenant governor. Griswold was sworn in for his first full term on May 10, 1810.

=== Results ===
Connecticut lieutenant gubernatorial election, 1810
Party	Candidate	Votes	%
Federalist	Roger Griswold (incumbent)	9,009	51.10
Democratic-Republican	Elijah Boardman	6,358	36.00
Federalist	John Cotton Smith	1,419	8.00
	Scattering	861	4.90
Total votes		17,647	100.00
Federalist hold			
