= 1807 Connecticut lieutenant gubernatorial election =

- April 13, 1807
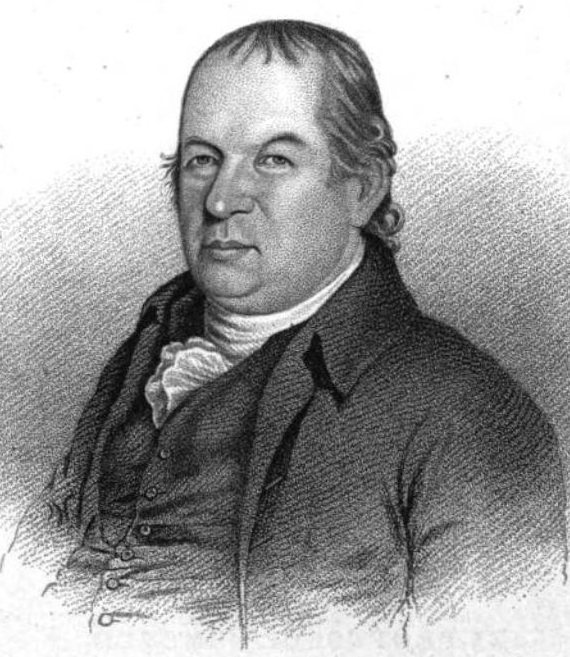

Nominee	John Treadwell	Asa Spalding
Party	Federalist	Democratic-Republican
Popular vote	10,851	7,025
Percentage	60.10%	38.90%
Lieutenant Governor before election
John Treadwell
Federalist
Elected Lieutenant Governor
John Treadwell
Federalist

The 1807 Connecticut lieutenant gubernatorial election was held on April 13, 1807, in order to elect the lieutenant governor of Connecticut. Incumbent Federalist lieutenant governor John Treadwell defeated Democratic-Republican candidate Asa Spalding in a re-match of the previous year's election.

== General election ==
On election day, April 13, 1807, incumbent Federalist lieutenant governor John Treadwell won re-election by a margin of 3,826 votes against his opponent Democratic-Republican candidate Asa Spalding, thereby retaining Federalist control over the office of lieutenant governor. Treadwell was sworn in for his tenth term on May 14, 1807.

=== Results ===
Connecticut lieutenant gubernatorial election, 1807
Party	Candidate	Votes	%
Federalist	John Treadwell (incumbent)	10,851	60.10
Democratic-Republican	Asa Spalding	7,025	38.90
	Scattering	187	1.00
Total votes		18,063	100.00
Federalist hold			
