= 1814 Connecticut gubernatorial election =

- April 11, 1814
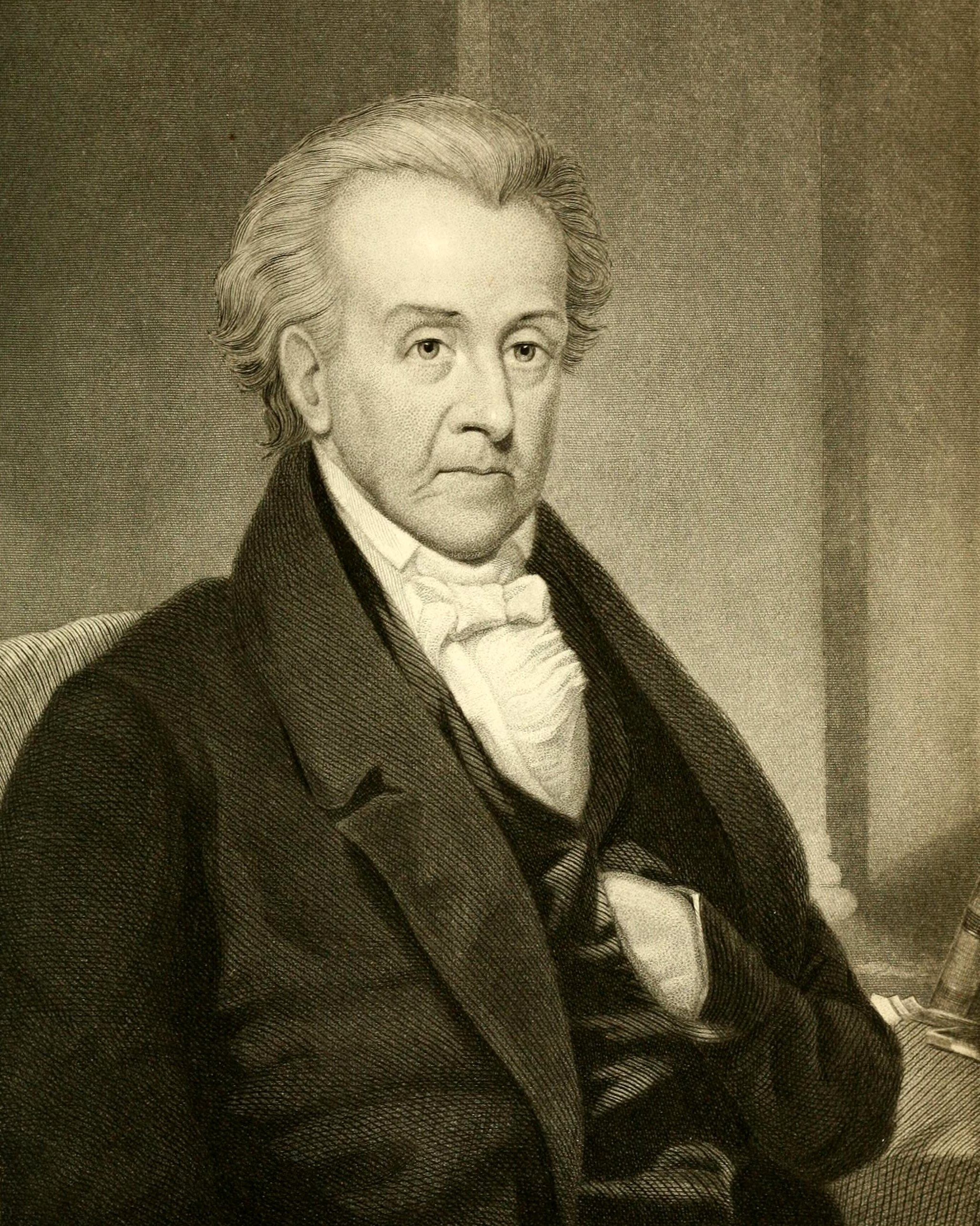

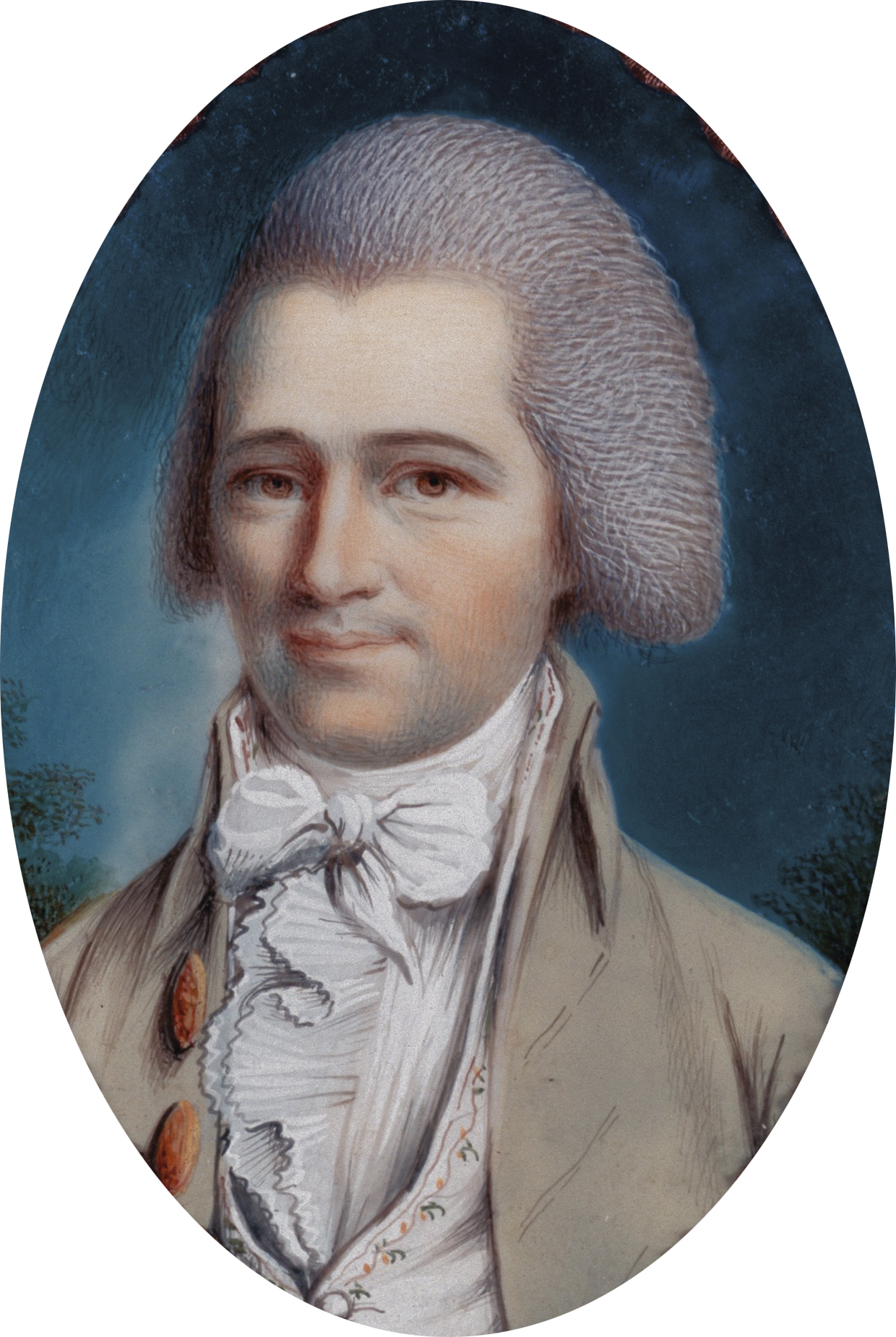
Nominee	John Cotton Smith	Elijah Boardman
Party	Federalist	Democratic-Republican
Popular vote	9,415	2,619
Percentage	72.87%	20.27%
- County results Smith: 70–80% >90% No data
Governor before election
John Cotton Smith
Federalist
Elected Governor
John Cotton Smith
Federalist

The 1814 Connecticut gubernatorial election took place on April 11, 1814.

Incumbent Federalist Governor John Cotton Smith defeated Democratic-Republican nominee Elijah Boardman in a re-match of the previous year's election.

== General election ==
=== Candidates ===
- Elijah Boardman, Democratic-Republican, former member of the Connecticut House of Representatives, Democratic-Republican nominee for Governor in 1812 and 1813
- John Cotton Smith, Federalist, incumbent Governor

=== Results ===
1814 Connecticut gubernatorial election
Party	Candidate	Votes	%	±%
Federalist	John Cotton Smith (incumbent)	9,415	72.87%	
Democratic-Republican	Elijah Boardman	2,619	20.27%	
Scattering		887	6.86%	
Majority		6,796	52.60%	
Turnout		12,921		
Federalist hold		Swing		
