= 1810 United States elections =

- ← 1808 1809 1810 1811 1812 → Midterm elections
- Incumbent president: ▌James Madison (DR)
- Next Congress: 12th

Senate elections
- Overall control: Democratic-Republican hold
- Seats contested: 11 of 34 seats
- Net seat change: Federalist -1

House elections
- Overall control: Democratic-Republican hold
- Seats contested: All 143 voting seats
- Net seat change: Democratic-Republican +13

Elections occurred in the middle of Democratic-Republican President James Madison's first term, during the First Party System. Members of the 12th United States Congress were chosen in this election. During the 12th Congress, Louisiana joined the union. The Democratic-Republicans continued to control both chambers of Congress.

In the House, the Democratic-Republicans picked up a moderate number of seats, increasing their already-dominant majority.

In the Senate, Democratic-Republicans won a small number of seats, increasing their commanding majority.

== See also ==
- 1810–11 United States House of Representatives elections
- 1810–11 United States Senate elections
