= 1810 Connecticut gubernatorial election =

- April 9, 1810
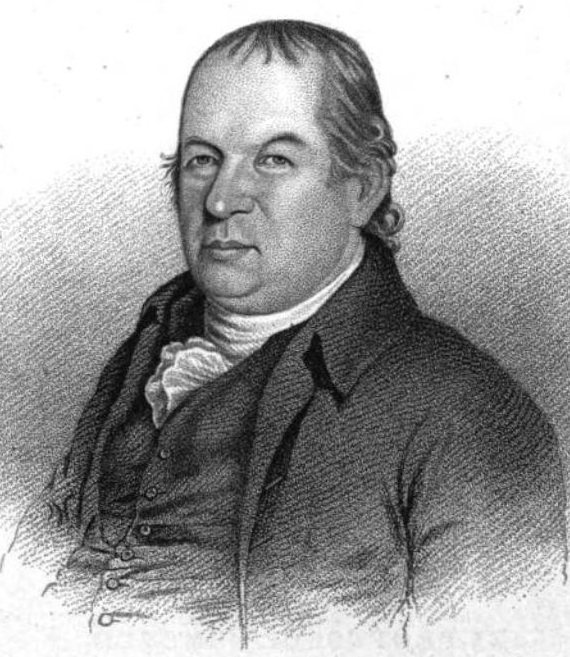

Nominee	John Treadwell	Asa Spalding	Roger Griswold
Party	Federalist	Democratic-Republican	Federalist
Electoral vote	121	42	29
Popular vote	10,265	7,185	3,110
Percentage	49.50%	34.65%	15.00%
- County results Treadwell: 50–60% Spalding: 30–40% 40–50%
Governor before election
John Treadwell
Federalist
Elected Governor
John Treadwell
Federalist

The 1810 Connecticut gubernatorial election took place on April 9, 1810.

Federalist Lieutenant Governor John Treadwell had become acting Governor on the death of Governor Jonathan Trumbull Jr. on August 7, 1809.

Treadwell was elected to a term in his own right, defeating Democratic-Republican nominee Asa Spalding and Federalist nominee Roger Griswold.

Since no candidate received a majority in the popular vote, Treadwell was elected by the Connecticut General Assembly per the Connecticut Charter of 1662.

== General election ==
=== Candidates ===
- Roger Griswold, Federalist, incumbent Lieutenant Governor
- Asa Spalding, Democratic-Republican, attorney, Democratic-Republican nominee for Governor in 1809
- John Treadwell, Federalist, incumbent Governor

Griswold was also a candidate in the concurrent election for Lieutenant Governor.

=== Results ===
1810 Connecticut gubernatorial election
Party	Candidate	Votes	%	±%
Federalist	John Treadwell (incumbent)	10,265	49.50%	
Democratic-Republican	Asa Spalding	7,185	34.65%	
Federalist	Roger Griswold	3,110	15.00%	
Scattering		177	0.85%	
Majority		3,080	14.85%	
Turnout		20,737		

=== Legislative election ===
As no candidate received a majority of the vote, the Connecticut General Assembly was required to decide the election, the House of Representatives making a choice with the concurrence of the Executive Council. The legislative election was held on May 11, 1810.

Connecticut House of Representatives election
Party	Candidate	Votes	%
Federalist	John Treadwell (incumbent)	121	63.02%
Democratic-Republican	Asa Spalding	42	21.88%
Federalist	Roger Griswold	29	15.10%
Turnout		192	
Federalist hold			

The Executive Council concurred unanimously in the House of Representatives' choice of Treadwell.
