= 1805 Connecticut lieutenant gubernatorial election =

- April 8, 1805
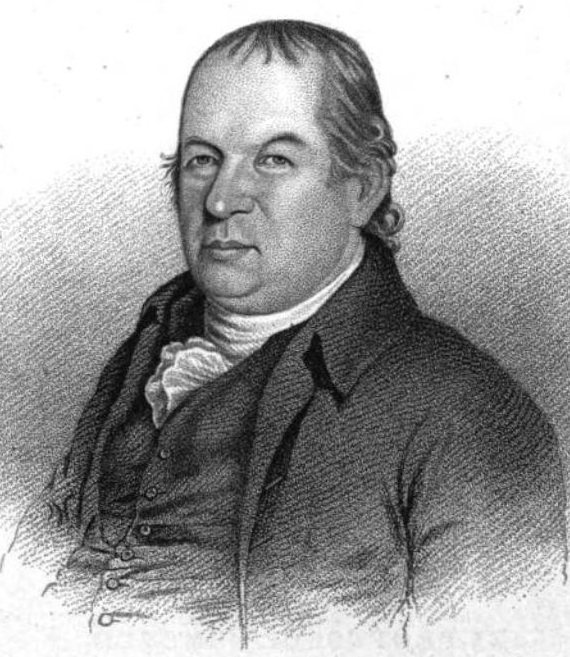

Nominee	John Treadwell	Asa Spalding
Party	Federalist	Democratic-Republican
Popular vote	10,635	7,178
Percentage	59.00%	39.80%
Lieutenant Governor before election
John Treadwell
Federalist
Elected Lieutenant Governor
John Treadwell
Federalist

The 1805 Connecticut lieutenant gubernatorial election was held on April 8, 1805, in order to elect the lieutenant governor of Connecticut. Incumbent Federalist lieutenant governor John Treadwell defeated Democratic-Republican candidate Asa Spalding in a re-match of the previous year's election.

== General election ==
On election day, April 8, 1805, incumbent Federalist lieutenant governor John Treadwell won re-election by a margin of 3,457 votes against his opponent Democratic-Republican candidate Asa Spalding, thereby retaining Federalist control over the office of lieutenant governor. Treadwell was sworn in for his eighth term on May 9, 1805.

=== Results ===
Connecticut lieutenant gubernatorial election, 1805
Party	Candidate	Votes	%
Federalist	John Treadwell (incumbent)	10,635	59.00
Democratic-Republican	Asa Spalding	7,178	39.80
	Scattering	202	1.20
Total votes		18,015	100.00
Federalist hold			
