= 1812 Connecticut lieutenant gubernatorial election =

Election in a U.S. state

- April 13, 1812
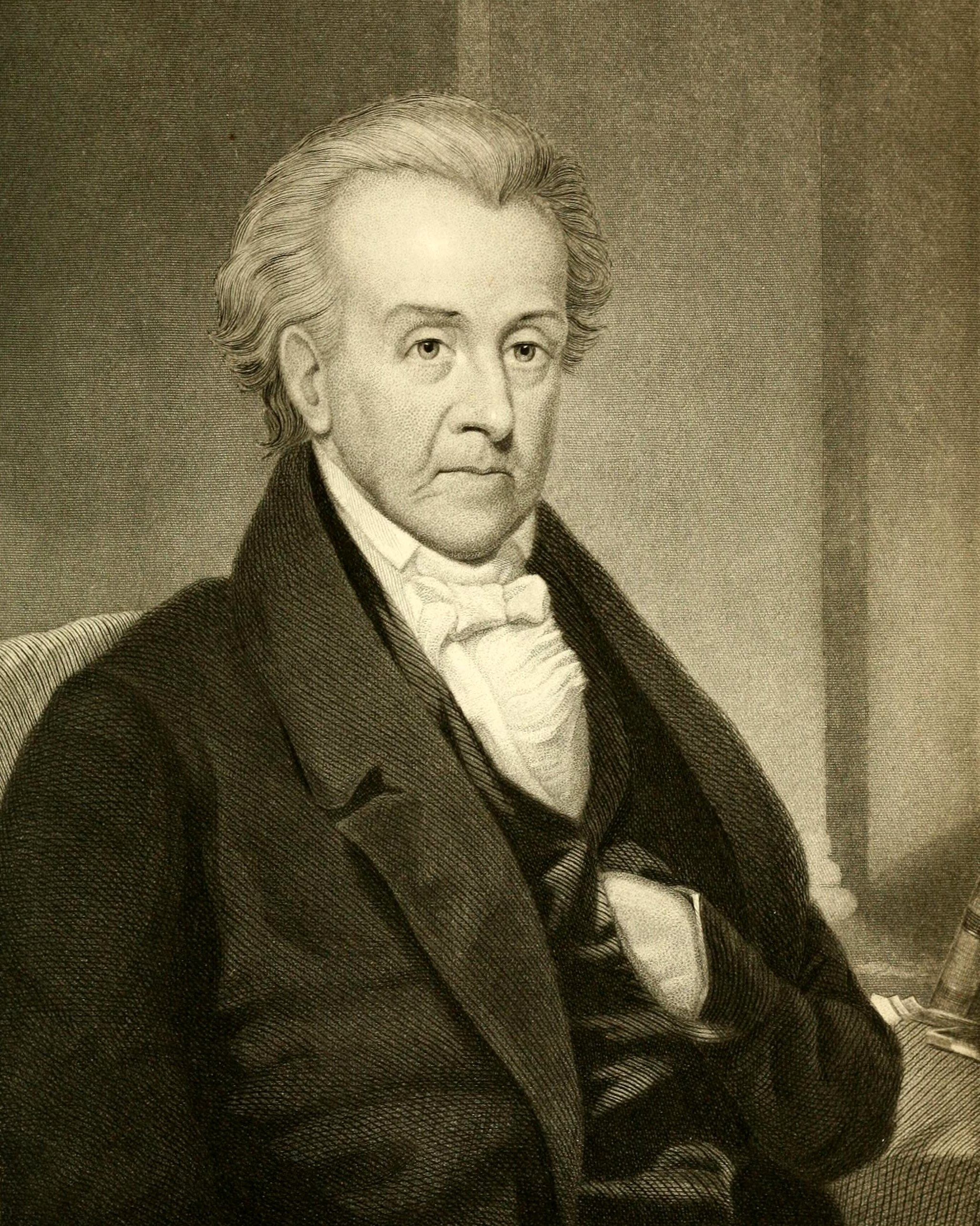

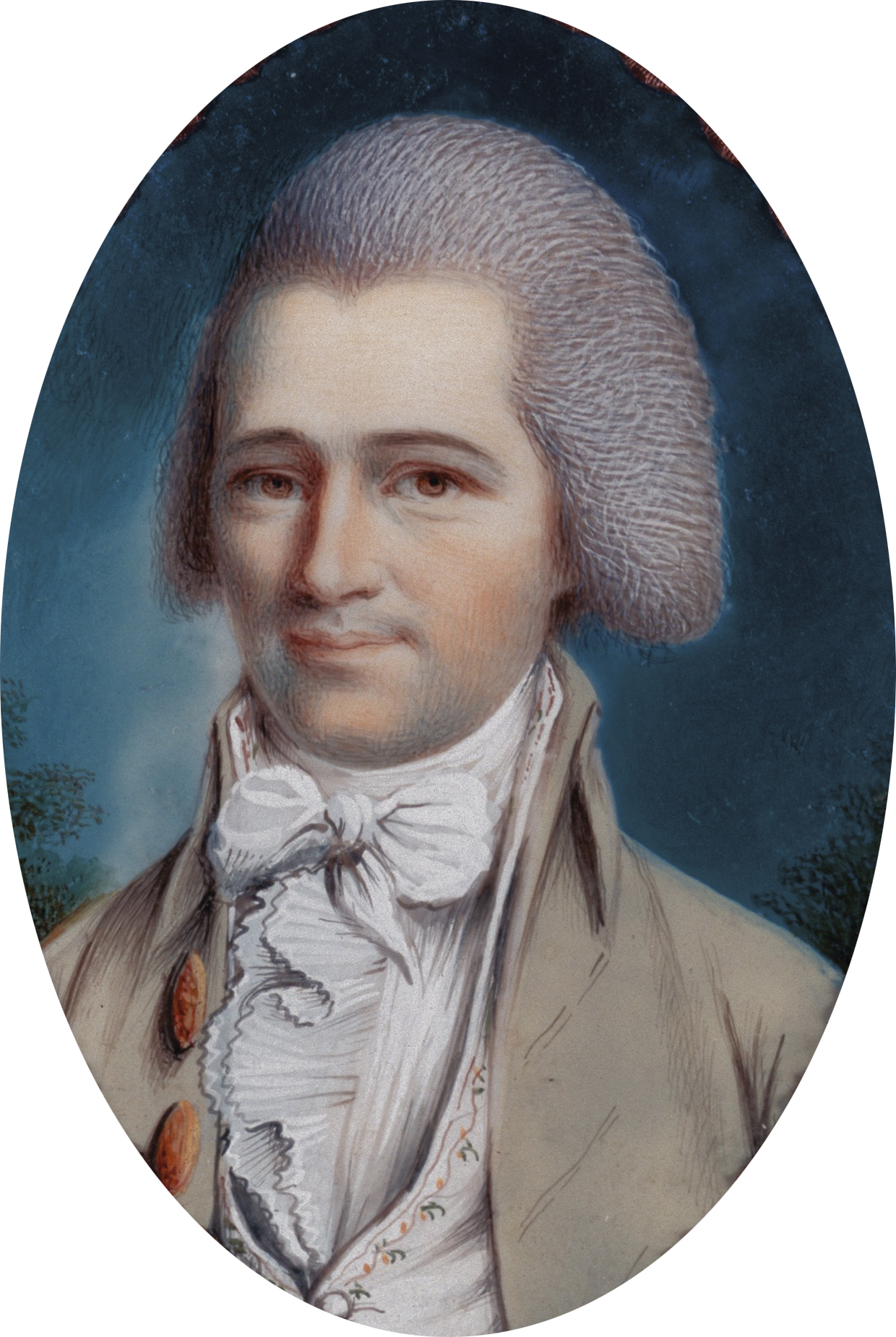
Nominee	John Cotton Smith	Elijah Boardman
Party	Federalist	Democratic-Republican
Popular vote	8,509	1,238
Percentage	85.40%	12.40%
Lieutenant Governor before election
John Cotton Smith
Federalist
Elected Lieutenant Governor
John Cotton Smith
Federalist

The 1812 Connecticut lieutenant gubernatorial election was held on April 13, 1812, in order to elect the lieutenant governor of Connecticut. Incumbent Federalist lieutenant governor John Cotton Smith defeated Democratic-Republican candidate Elijah Boardman.

== General election ==
On election day, April 13, 1812, incumbent Federalist lieutenant governor John Cotton Smith won re-election by a margin of 7,271 votes against his opponent Democratic-Republican candidate Elijah Boardman, thereby retaining Federalist control over the office of lieutenant governor. Smith was sworn in for his second term on May 14, 1812.

=== Results ===
Connecticut lieutenant gubernatorial election, 1812
Party	Candidate	Votes	%
Federalist	John Cotton Smith (incumbent)	8,509	85.40
Democratic-Republican	Elijah Boardman	1,238	12.40
	Scattering	222	2.20
Total votes		9,969	100.00
Federalist hold			
