= 1804 Connecticut lieutenant gubernatorial election =

- April 9, 1804
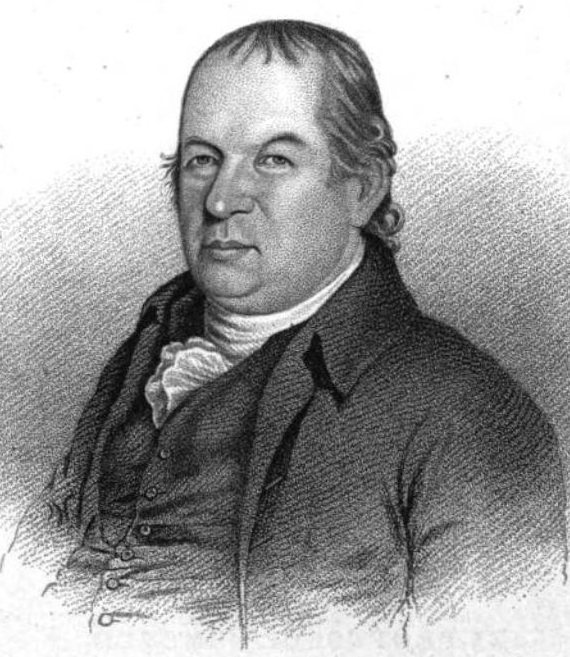

Nominee	John Treadwell	Asa Spalding
Party	Federalist	Democratic-Republican
Popular vote	9,592	5,970
Percentage	60.80%	37.90%
Lieutenant Governor before election
John Treadwell
Federalist
Elected Lieutenant Governor
John Treadwell
Federalist

The 1804 Connecticut lieutenant gubernatorial election was held on April 9, 1804, in order to elect the lieutenant governor of Connecticut. Incumbent Federalist lieutenant governor John Treadwell defeated Democratic-Republican candidate Asa Spalding.

== General election ==
On election day, April 9, 1804, incumbent Federalist lieutenant governor John Treadwell won re-election by a margin of 3,622 votes against his opponent Democratic-Republican candidate Asa Spalding, thereby retaining Federalist control over the office of lieutenant governor. Treadwell was sworn in for his seventh term on May 10, 1804.

=== Results ===
Connecticut lieutenant gubernatorial election, 1804
Party	Candidate	Votes	%
Federalist	John Treadwell (incumbent)	9,592	60.80
Democratic-Republican	Asa Spalding	5,970	37.90
	Scattering	211	1.30
Total votes		15,773	100.00
Federalist hold			
