= 1813 Connecticut gubernatorial election =

- April 12, 1813
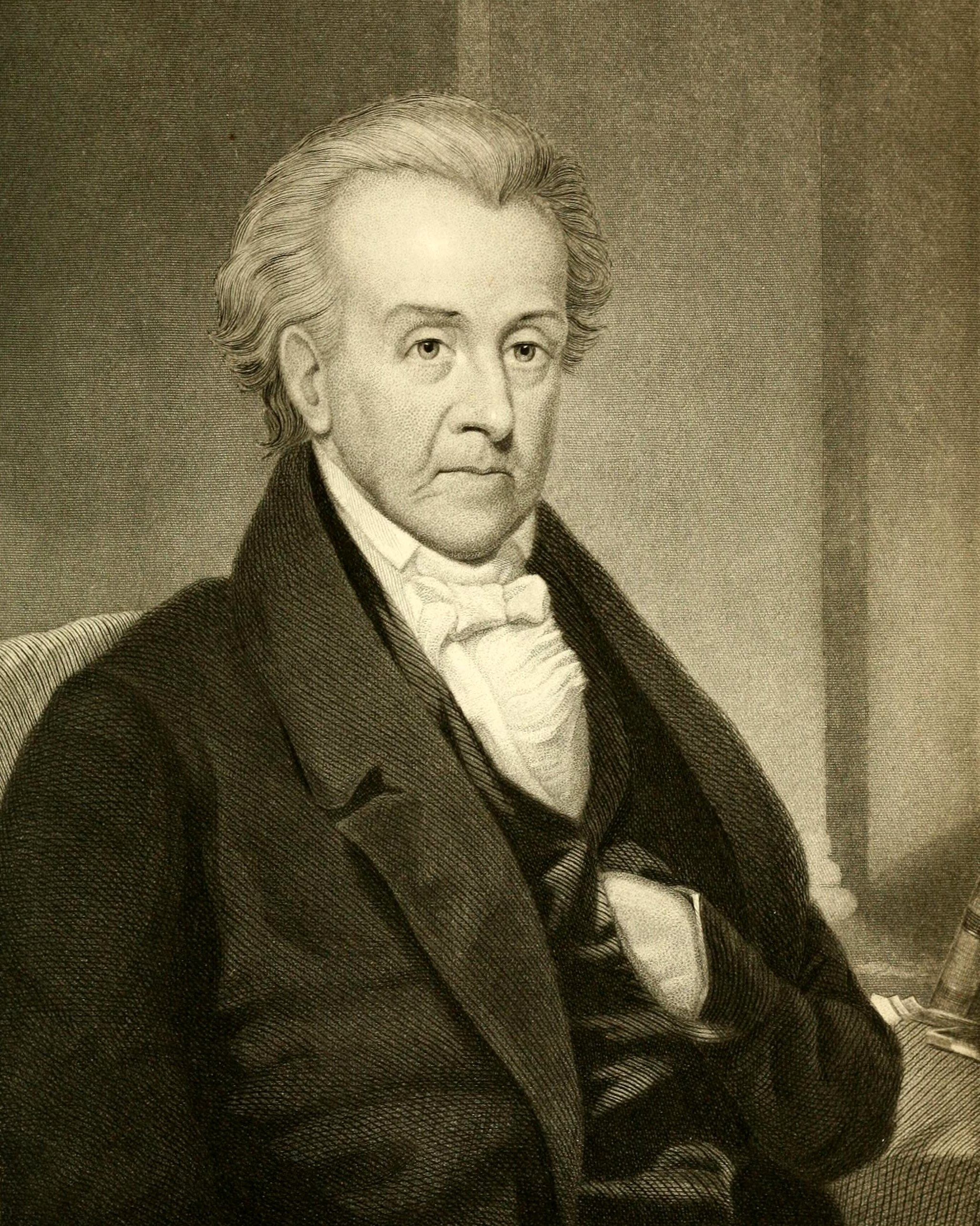

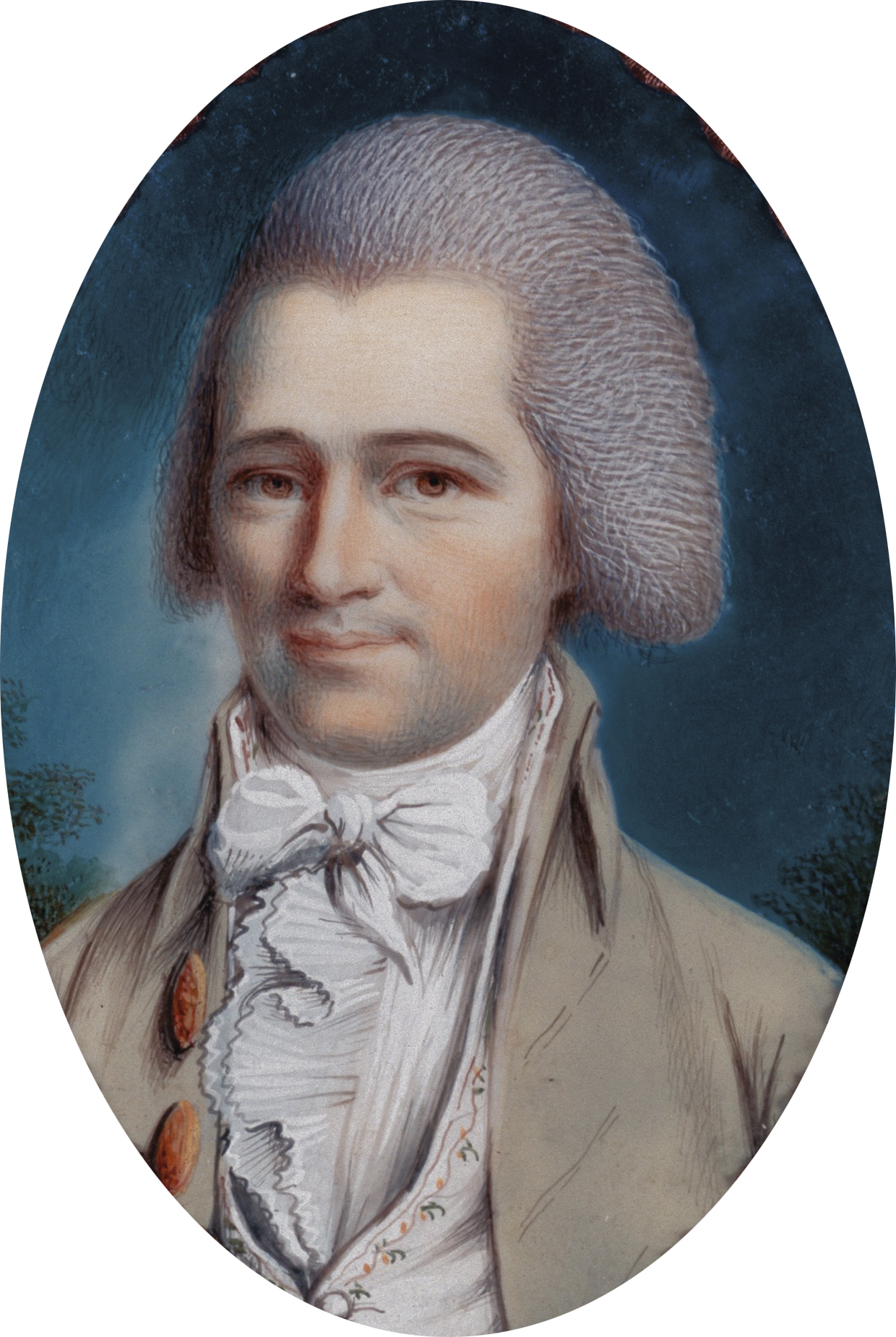
Nominee	John Cotton Smith	Elijah Boardman
Party	Federalist	Democratic-Republican
Popular vote	11,893	7,201
Percentage	59.12%	35.80%
- County results Smith: 50–60% 60–70% 70–80%
Governor before election
John Cotton Smith
Federalist
Elected Governor
John Cotton Smith
Federalist

The 1813 Connecticut gubernatorial election took place on April 12, 1813.

Federalist Lieutenant Governor John Cotton Smith had become acting Governor on the death of Governor Roger Griswold on October 25, 1812. Smith was elected to a term in his own right, defeating Democratic-Republican nominee Elijah Boardman.

== General election ==
=== Candidates ===
- Elijah Boardman, Democratic-Republican, former member of the Connecticut House of Representatives, Democratic-Republican nominee for Governor in 1812
- John Cotton Smith, Federalist, acting Governor

=== Results ===
1813 Connecticut gubernatorial election
Party	Candidate	Votes	%	±%
Federalist	John Cotton Smith (incumbent)	11,893	59.12%	
Democratic-Republican	Elijah Boardman	7,201	35.80%	
Scattering (Note: Contemporary newspapers list the scattering votes as Federalist. Chauncey Goodrich appears to have received the major share of them and he is often credited by 20th Century sources with these votes. Goodrich was a candidate in the concurrent election for Lieutenant Governor.)		1,023	5.08%	
Majority		4,692	23.32%	
Turnout		20,117		
Federalist hold		Swing		
