= List of elections in 1811 =

The following elections occurred in the year 1811.

== North America ==
=== United States ===
==== United States lieutenant gubernatorial ====
- 1811 Connecticut lieutenant gubernatorial election
- 1811 New York lieutenant gubernatorial special election

==== United States gubernatorial ====
- 1811 Connecticut gubernatorial election
- 1811 Georgia gubernatorial election
- 1811 Maryland gubernatorial election
- 1811 Massachusetts gubernatorial election
- 1811 New Hampshire gubernatorial election
- 1811 New Jersey gubernatorial election
- 1811 North Carolina gubernatorial election
- 1811 Rhode Island gubernatorial election
- 1811 Tennessee gubernatorial election
- 1811 Vermont gubernatorial election
- 1811 Virginia gubernatorial election
- 1811 Virginia gubernatorial special election

==== United States Senate ====
- 1810 and 1811 United States Senate elections

==== United States House of Representatives ====
- 1810 and 1811 United States House of Representatives elections
- 1811 Connecticut's at-large congressional district special election
- 1811 Maryland's 4th congressional district special election
- 1811 Maryland's 6th congressional district special election
- 1811 Maryland's 7th congressional district special election
- 1811 Massachusetts's 4th congressional district special election
- 1811 Massachusetts's 10th congressional district special election
- 1811 New York's 6th congressional district special election
- 1811 United States House of Representatives elections in Rhode Island
- 1811 United States House of Representatives elections in Tennessee
- 1811 United States House of Representatives elections in Virginia
- 1811 Virginia's 1st congressional district special election

== Europe ==
=== United Kingdom ===
- 1811 University of Cambridge Chancellor election

== See also ==
- Category:1811 elections
