= 1812 United States elections =

- ← 1810 1811 1812 1813 1814 → Presidential election year
- Incumbent president: ▌James Madison (DR)
- Next Congress: 13th

Presidential election
- Partisan control: Democratic-Republican hold
- Electoral vote
- James Madison (DR): 128
- DeWitt Clinton (DR/F): 89
- 1812 presidential election results. Green denotes states won by Madison, burnt orange denotes states won by Clinton. Numbers indicate the number of electoral votes allotted to each state.

Senate elections
- Overall control: Democratic-Republican hold
- Seats contested: 12 of 36 seats
- Net seat change: Federalist +2

House elections
- Overall control: Democratic-Republican hold
- Seats contested: All 182 voting members
- Net seat change: Democratic-Republican +7

Elections for the 13th United States Congress were held in 1812 and 1813. The election took place during the First Party System, and shortly after the start of the War of 1812. The Federalist Party made a relatively strong showing, winning seats in both chambers while supporting a competitive challenge to the incumbent Democratic-Republican president James Madison. However, the Democratic-Republican Party continued its control of the presidency and both houses of Congress.

In the presidential election, incumbent Democratic-Republican President James Madison defeated the New York Lieutenant Governor and New York City Mayor DeWitt Clinton. Clinton was a member of the Democratic-Republican Party, but his presidential bid received the support of both anti-Madison Democratic-Republicans and many Federalists. Although Madison won, the presidential election was the closest since the 1800 election, as Clinton won New England and three mid-Atlantic states.

Following the 1810 census, 39 seats were added to the House. Federalists won major gains, but Democratic-Republicans continued to dominate the chamber.

In the Senate, Federalists picked up a small number of seats, but Democratic-Republicans retained a dominant majority.

== Background ==
Military conflict resulting from the Napoleonic Wars in Europe had been steadily worsening throughout James Madison's first term, and the British and French had been ignoring the neutrality of the United States at sea by seizing American ships to look for supposed deserters. The British further provoked the Americans by impressing American seamen, maintaining forts within United States territory in the Northwest, and supporting Native Americans at war with the U.S. Meanwhile, expansionists in the south and west of the United States coveted British Canada and Spanish Florida and wanted to use British provocations as a pretext to seize both areas. The pressure continued to build, and as a result the United States declared war on the United Kingdom on June 12, 1812. This occurred after Madison had been nominated by the Democratic-Republicans, but before the Federalists had made their nomination.

The Federalist Party had dominated the American government from 1789 to 1801 under Alexander Hamilton whilst retaining a stronghold in New England. It made a brief resurgence in the 1812 election by opposing the war, and dissolved shortly after in 1834.

== See also ==
- 1812 United States presidential election
- 1812–13 United States House of Representatives elections
- 1812–13 United States Senate elections
