= 1811 Connecticut gubernatorial election =

- April 8, 1811

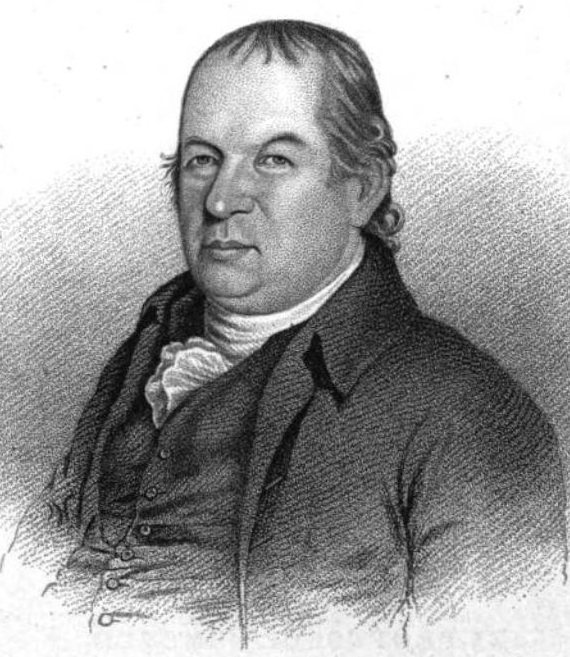
Nominee	Roger Griswold	John Treadwell
Party	Federalist	Federalist
Alliance	Democratic-Republican
Popular vote	10,148	8,727
Percentage	52.37%	45.04%
- County results Griswold: 40–50% 50–60% 60–70% 70–80% Treadwell: 50–60%
Governor before election
John Treadwell
Federalist
Elected Governor
Roger Griswold
Federalist

The 1811 Connecticut gubernatorial election took place on April 8, 1811.

Incumbent Federalist Governor John Treadwell was defeated by Roger Griswold, a Federalist who received the support of the Democratic-Republican Party.

== General election ==
=== Candidates ===
- Roger Griswold, Federalist, incumbent Lieutenant Governor
- John Treadwell, Federalist, incumbent Governor

Both candidates were Federalists; Griswold was supported by the Democratic-Republicans.

Contemporary sources indicate that Treadwell was supported by the established church while Griswold was supported by lawyers.

=== Results ===
1811 Connecticut gubernatorial election
Party	Candidate	Votes	%	±%
Federalist	Roger Griswold	10,148	52.37%	
Federalist	John Treadwell (incumbent)	8,727	45.04%	
Scattering		502	2.59%	
Majority		1,421	7.33%	
Turnout		19,377		
Federalist hold		Swing		
