= 1812 Rhode Island gubernatorial election =

- April 1, 1812
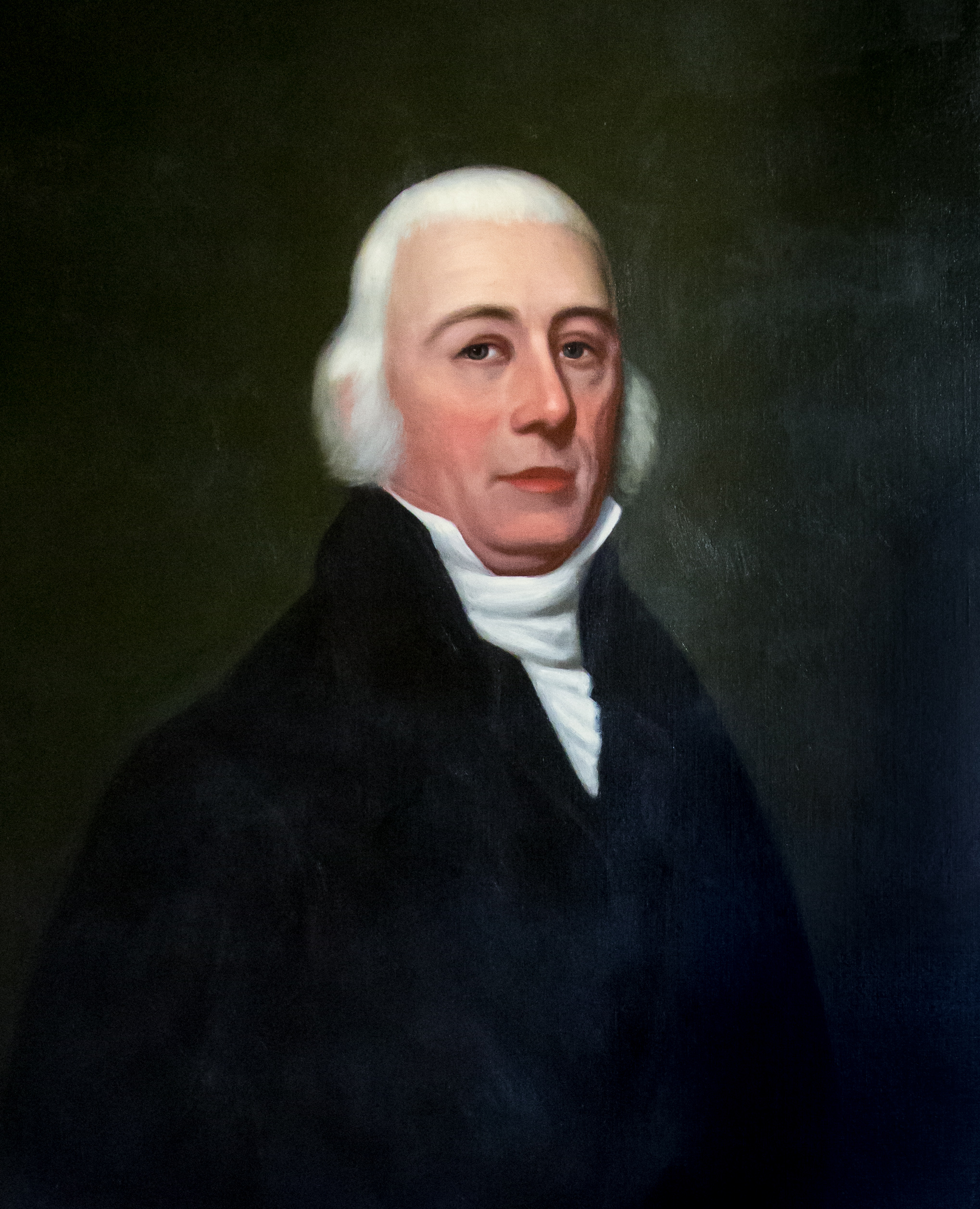

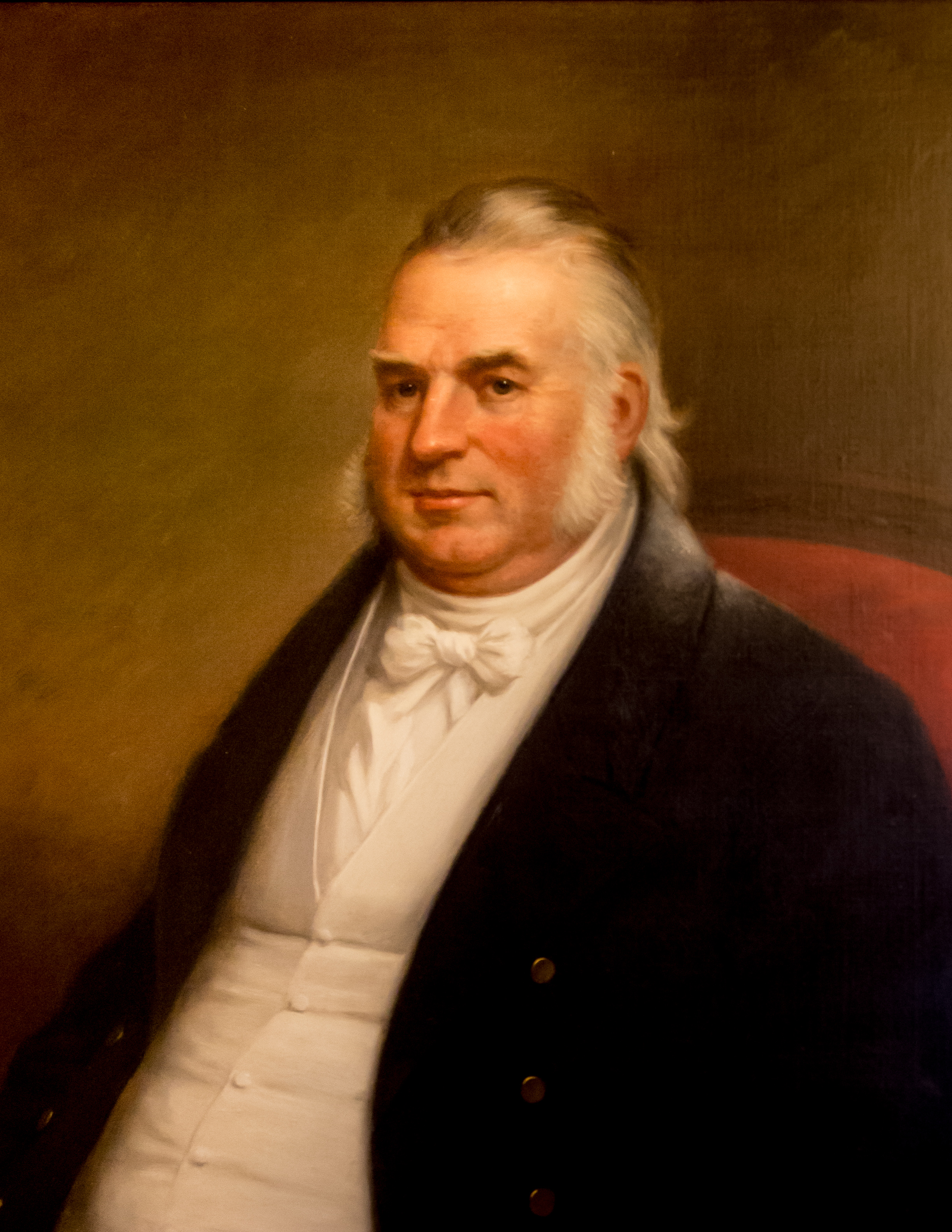
Nominee	William Jones	James Fenner
Party	Federalist	Democratic-Republican
Popular vote	4,122	3,874
Percentage	51.45%	48.36%
- County results Jones: 50–60% Fenner: 50–60%
Governor before election
William Jones
Federalist
Elected Governor
William Jones
Federalist

The 1812 Rhode Island gubernatorial election was held on April 1, 1812, in order to elect the governor of Rhode Island. Incumbent Federalist governor William Jones won re-election against former Democratic-Republican governor James Fenner in a rematch of the previous election.

== General election ==
On election day, April 1, 1812, incumbent Federalist governor William Jones won re-election by a margin of 248 votes against his opponent former Democratic-Republican governor James Fenner, thereby retaining Federalist control over the office of governor. Jones was sworn in for his second term on May 7, 1812.

=== Results ===
Rhode Island gubernatorial election, 1812
Party	Candidate	Votes	%
Federalist	William Jones (incumbent)	4,122	51.45
Democratic-Republican	James Fenner	3,874	48.36
	Scattering	15	0.19
Total votes		8,011	100.00
Federalist hold			
