= 1812 Virginia gubernatorial election =

- December 5, 1812
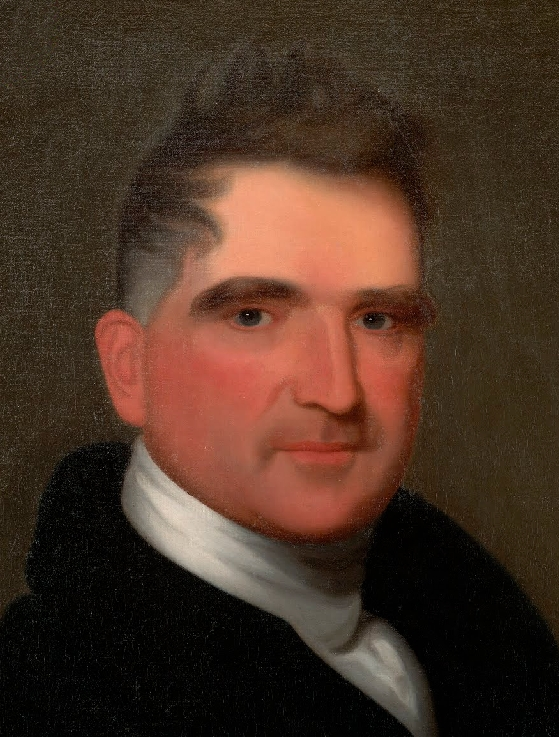
| Nominee | James Barbour |
Governor before election
James Barbour
Democratic-Republican
Elected Governor
James Barbour
Democratic-Republican (Note: Lampi lists no parties for this election. Both Kallenbach and Kallenbach and Sobel and Raimo list Barbour as a Democratic-Republican during his tenure.)

A gubernatorial election was held in Virginia on December 5, 1812. The incumbent governor of Virginia James Barbour was re-elected without opposition.

Barbour's tenure coincided with the War of 1812. His administration of the state's affairs met with the broad approval of the public and their representatives, and he faced no challenger for re-election when the legislature convened in late November.

The election was conducted by the Virginia General Assembly in joint session. Barbour was elected with a majority on the first ballot.

== General election ==
1812 Virginia gubernatorial election
| Candidate | First ballot | |
| Candidate | Count | Percent |
|---|---|---|
| James Barbour (incumbent) | ** | |
| Total | ** | 100.00 |

== Bibliography ==
- Kallenbach, Joseph E.; Kallenbach, Jessamine S. (1977). American State Governors, 1776–1976. Vol. 1. Dobbs Ferry, NY: Oceana Publications.
- Lampi, Philip J. (2012). "Virginia 1812 Governor". A New Nation Votes. American Antiquarian Society.
- Lowery, Charles D. (1984). James Barbour: A Jeffersonian Republican. University, AL: University of Alabama Press.
- Sobel, Robert; Raimo, John (1978). Biographical Directory of the Governors of the United States 1789–1978. Vol. 4. Westport, CT: Meckler Books.
- Virginia (n.d.). Journal of the House of Delegates [...]. Richmond.
