= 1812 New Jersey gubernatorial election =

- October 29, 1812
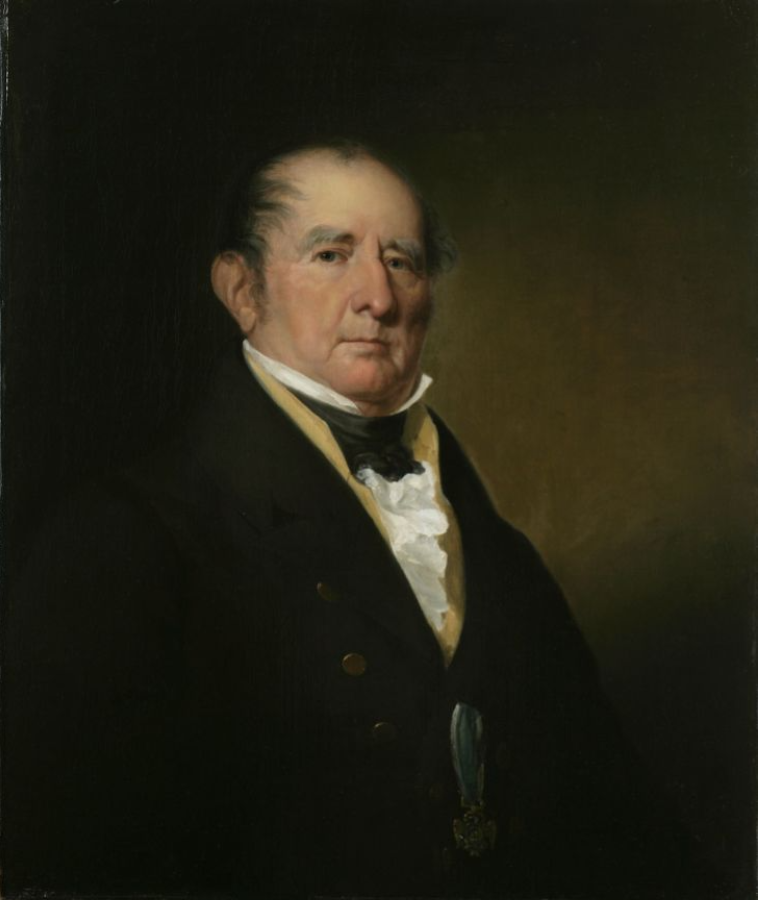

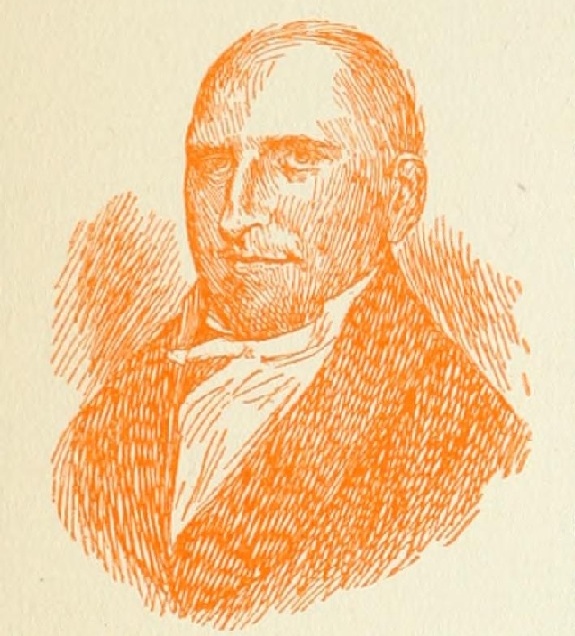
| Nominee | Aaron Ogden | William Sanford Pennington |
| Party | Federalist | Democratic-Republican |
| Popular vote | 30 | 22 |
| Percentage | 57.69% | 42.31% |
Governor before election
Joseph Bloomfield
Democratic-Republican
Elected Governor
Aaron Ogden
Federalist

The 1812 New Jersey gubernatorial election was held on October 29, 1812, in order to elect the Governor of New Jersey. Federalist nominee and former United States Senator from New Jersey Aaron Ogden was elected by the New Jersey General Assembly against Democratic-Republican nominee and former United States Attorney for the District of New Jersey William Sanford Pennington.

== General election ==
On election day, October 29, 1812, Federalist nominee Aaron Ogden was elected by the New Jersey General Assembly by a margin of 8 votes against his opponent Democratic-Republican nominee William Sanford Pennington, thereby gaining Federalist control over the office of Governor. Ogden was sworn in as the 5th Governor of New Jersey that same day.

=== Results ===
New Jersey gubernatorial election, 1812
| Party | Candidate | Votes | % |
|---|---|---|---|
| Federalist | Aaron Ogden | 30 | 57.69% |
| Democratic-Republican | William Sanford Pennington | 22 | 42.31% |
| Total votes | | 52 | 100.00% |
| Federalist gain from Democratic-Republican | | | |
