= John Cotton Smith =

American lawyer, judge and politician (1765–1845)

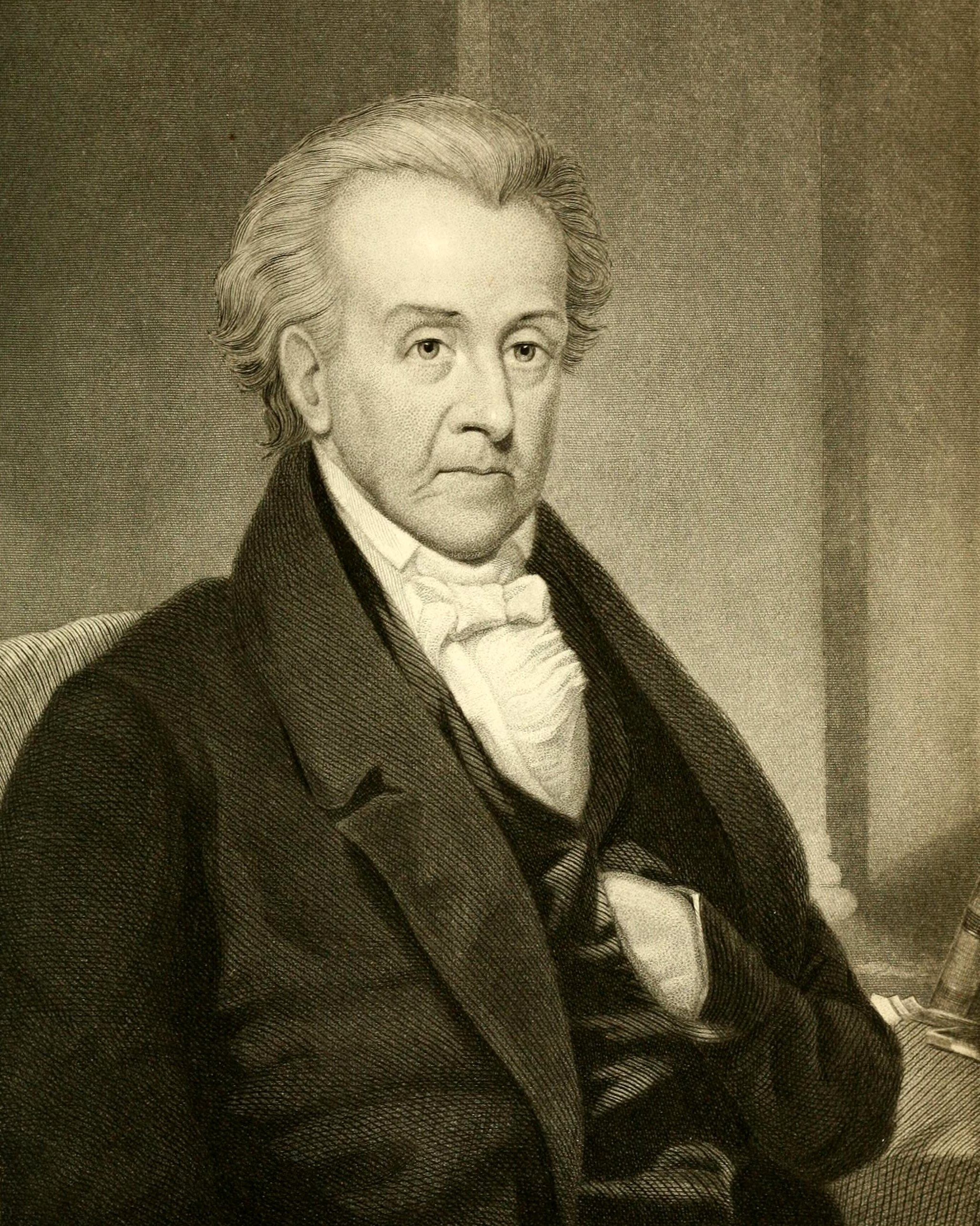

Member of the U.S. House of Representatives from Connecticut's at-large district
- In office November 17, 1800 – August 1806
- Preceded by: Roger Griswold
- Succeeded by: James Davenport

27th Lieutenant Governor of Connecticut
- In office May 9, 1811 – October 25, 1812
- Governor: Roger Griswold
- Preceded by: Roger Griswold
- Succeeded by: Chauncey Goodrich

23rd Governor of Connecticut
- In office October 25, 1812 – May 8, 1817
- Lieutenant: Chauncey Goodrich
- Preceded by: Roger Griswold
- Succeeded by: Oliver Wolcott Jr.

Member of the Connecticut House of Representatives
- In office 1793; 1796; 1800

Personal details
- Born: February 12, 1765 Sharon, Connecticut Colony, British America
- Died: December 7, 1845 (aged 80) Sharon, Connecticut, U.S.
- Party: Federalist
- Spouse: Margaret Evertson Smith
- Parent: Cotton Mather Smith
- Education: Yale College
- Occupation: Lawyer, Judge, Politician

John Cotton Smith (February 12, 1765 – December 7, 1845) was an American lawyer, judge and politician from Connecticut. He served as a member of the United States House of Representatives, as the 27th lieutenant governor of Connecticut and as the 23rd governor of Connecticut.

== Biography ==
Smith was born in Sharon in the Connecticut Colony, the son of Cotton Mather Smith, a Puritan minister who moved from Massachusetts to Connecticut. Smith completed preparatory studies and graduated from Yale College in 1783. After graduation, he studied law and was admitted to the bar. He began the practice of law in Sharon in 1787. Smith married Margaret Evertson and they had one son together.

He entered politics as a member of the Connecticut House of Representatives in 1793. He served in the State House in 1793, 1796 and 1800. In 1800 he served as speaker of that body.

Smith was elected as a Federalist candidate to the Sixth Congress to fill the vacancy caused by the resignation of Jonathan Brace. He was reelected to the Seventh, Eighth and Ninth Congresses, serving from November 17, 1800, until his resignation in August 1806. Smith was chairman of the Committee on Claims in the Seventh through Ninth Congresses.

After serving in Congress, Smith served as an associate judge of the Superior Court and Supreme Court of Errors from 1809 to 1811. He served as the 27th Lieutenant Governor of Connecticut from 1811 to 1812. He was the 23rd Governor of Connecticut from October 25, 1812, to May 8, 1817. Smith was an unsuccessful candidate for Governor on the Federalist ticket in 1817. He was the last Federalist Governor of Connecticut.

Smith retired from politics but remained involved in academic and religious organizations. He was a member of the Massachusetts Historical Society, the Connecticut Historical Society, and was elected a member of the American Antiquarian Society in 1813. He served as president of the American Bible Society from 1831 until his death in 1845. Smith died on December 7, 1845, in Sharon. He is interred in Hillside Cemetery.

Smith's home in Sharon is listed on the National Register of Historic Places.

== Popular culture ==
Henry Russell dedicated the song My Mother's Bible to Gov. Smith.

Party political offices
Preceded by Roger Griswold	Federalist nominee for Governor of Connecticut; 1813, 1814, 1815, 1816, 1817	Succeeded by Timothy Pitkin
U.S. House of Representatives
Preceded by Jonathan Brace	Member of the U.S. House of Representatives from Connecticut's at-large congressional district 1800–1806	Succeeded by Theodore Dwight
Political offices
Preceded by Roger Griswold	Lieutenant Governor of Connecticut; 1811–1813	Succeeded by Chauncey Goodrich
Preceded by Roger Griswold	Governor of Connecticut; 1812–1817	Succeeded by Oliver Wolcott Jr.
