= Elijah Boardman =

American politician (1760–1823)

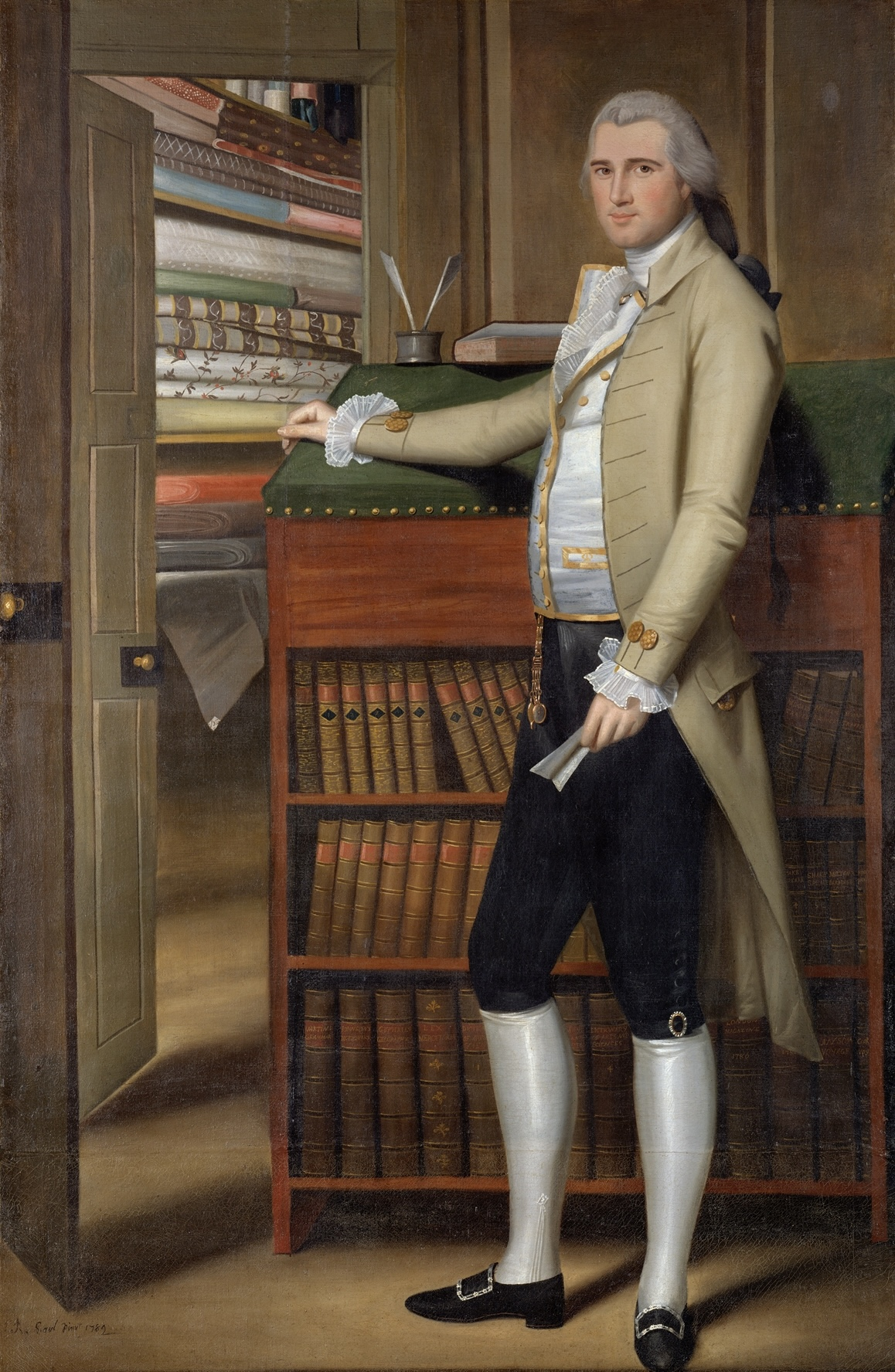
- Portrait by Ralph Earl, c. 1789

United States Senator from Connecticut
- In office March 4, 1821 – August 18, 1823
- Preceded by: Samuel W. Dana
- Succeeded by: Henry W. Edwards

Personal details
- Born: March 7, 1760 New Milford, Connecticut Colony
- Died: August 18, 1823 (aged 63) Boardman, Ohio, U.S.
- Resting place: New Milford, Connecticut
- Party: Democratic Republican
- Children: William Whiting Boardman
- Occupation: Dry goods merchant

Elijah Boardman (March 7, 1760 – August 18, 1823) was an American politician who served as a senator from Connecticut. Born to a noted and politically connected Connecticut family, he served in the Connecticut militia before becoming a noted merchant and businessman. Becoming involved in property and land ownership in Connecticut and Ohio, he founded the towns of Boardman and Medina in Ohio. His involvement in politics also increased, and he gradually rose through the ranks of the local, and then national government, being elected by the Connecticut legislature to the United States Senate. He served as Senator from Connecticut until his death in Ohio.

== Biography ==
Coat of Arms of Elija Boardman

=== Early life ===
Boardman, was born in New Milford in Connecticut, the third of four children for Deacon Sherman Boardman (1728–1814) and Sarah Bostwick Boardman (1730–1818). His father, son of the first minister of the Congregational Church, was a "prosperous farmer", well educated and well versed in local politics – he was 21 times elected as a member of the General Assembly of Connecticut – and was familiar with "civil and military concerns of the town." The Boardman family were the town's founding family, and lived on a "substantial farm" on the Housatonic River.

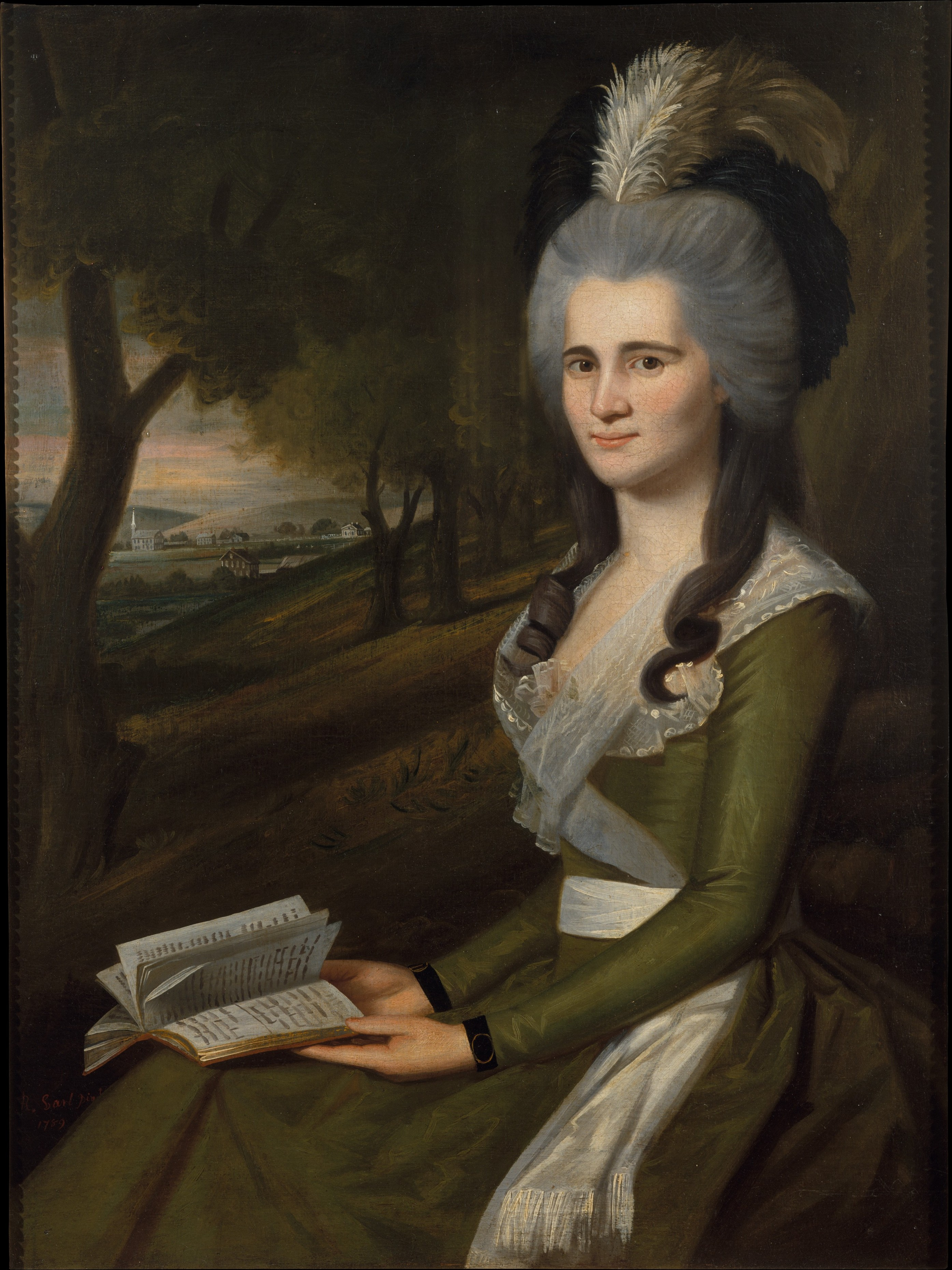
Portrait by Ralph Earl of Elijah Boardman's sister Esther Boardman 1762–1851.

A biographer of his later wife wrote of Elijah Boardman: "Inheriting many of the good qualities of his father and his grandfather, he combined, with those good qualities, the energy and intrepidity of his mother and of his grandmother, respecting both of whom there are preserved family traditions of much historical and domestic interest." The biographer also noted Boardman to be "dignified" in personal appearance, and handsome. His brother, David Sherman Boardman, remarked that he was "inclined" to hilarity. Elijah Boardman was educated by private tutors – including tutoring in Latin by the Reverend Nathaniel Taylor and other matters by his own mother – at home before enlisting in the Connecticut militia to serve in the American Revolutionary War as a "common soldier", in March 1776 aged 16.

=== Revolutionary War ===
Under Captain Isaac Bostwick, Boardman served in one of the first sixteen regiments raised by the Continental Congress under the command of Colonel Charles Webb. Boardman was directed to Boston, and diverted to New London and New York City, where he took part in Battle of Long Island, however after defeat there and American evacuation to Washington, he was confined to a sick bed having exacerbated childhood medical difficulties and fever. After six months, having achieved an ultimate rank of sergeant, he obtained passage on a wagon back to New York, where he was discovered in poor health by a friend of his father, who sent word home for Boardman to be collected. Meanwhile, Boardman obtained a discharge from the army.

In the summer of 1777, Sir Henry Clinton led British forces through Fort Montgomery and prompted a call-up of Connecticut militia, which Boardman joined until the danger passed following the surrender of General Burgoyne, whereupon the militia was disbanded. Now detached from the army, Boardman resumed his tutorship under John Hickling, a family tutor employed by Boardman's father.

=== Mercantile employment ===
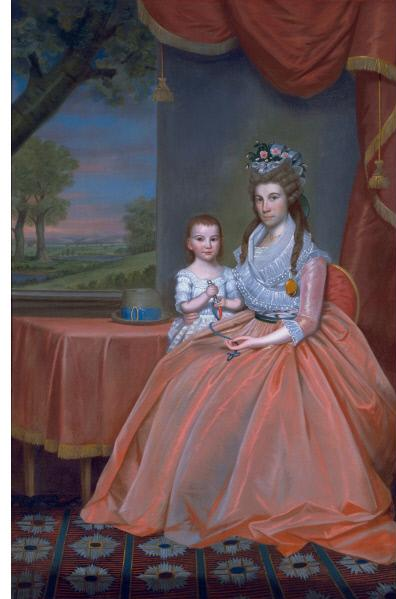
Mary Anna Whiting and son William Whiting Boardman, oil canvas painting by Ralph Earl in 1795 or 1796. William was the first son of Mary Anna and Elijah, and went on to have a political career of his own.

In 1781, Boardman took work as a clerk and as a merchant. He spent time employed in New Haven, training as a shopkeeper in the store of Elijah and Archibald Austin, before setting up his own company in his home town of New Milford later that same year. This business, a dry-goods store, was operated in conjunction with his two brothers, David and Daniel. As part of his travels, he visited Ohio, where he founded the town of Boardman. In 1789, he was the subject of a portrait by Ralph Earl, which "portrayed the richly dressed dry goods merchant... in his store in New Milford... through the open door, bolts of textiles tell the viewer how Boardman earned a living." Earl's most "accomplished" and successful series of paintings were of the Boardman family. Boardman then married Mary Anna Whiting on September 25, 1792, for whom he would build 'Boardman House', which still stands in New Milford. By this time, he had also opened a second shop outside of any partnership with his brothers, which was situated in Litchfield County and was designed by architect William Sprats, and on October 10, 1794, his first son, William Whiting Boardman, was born.

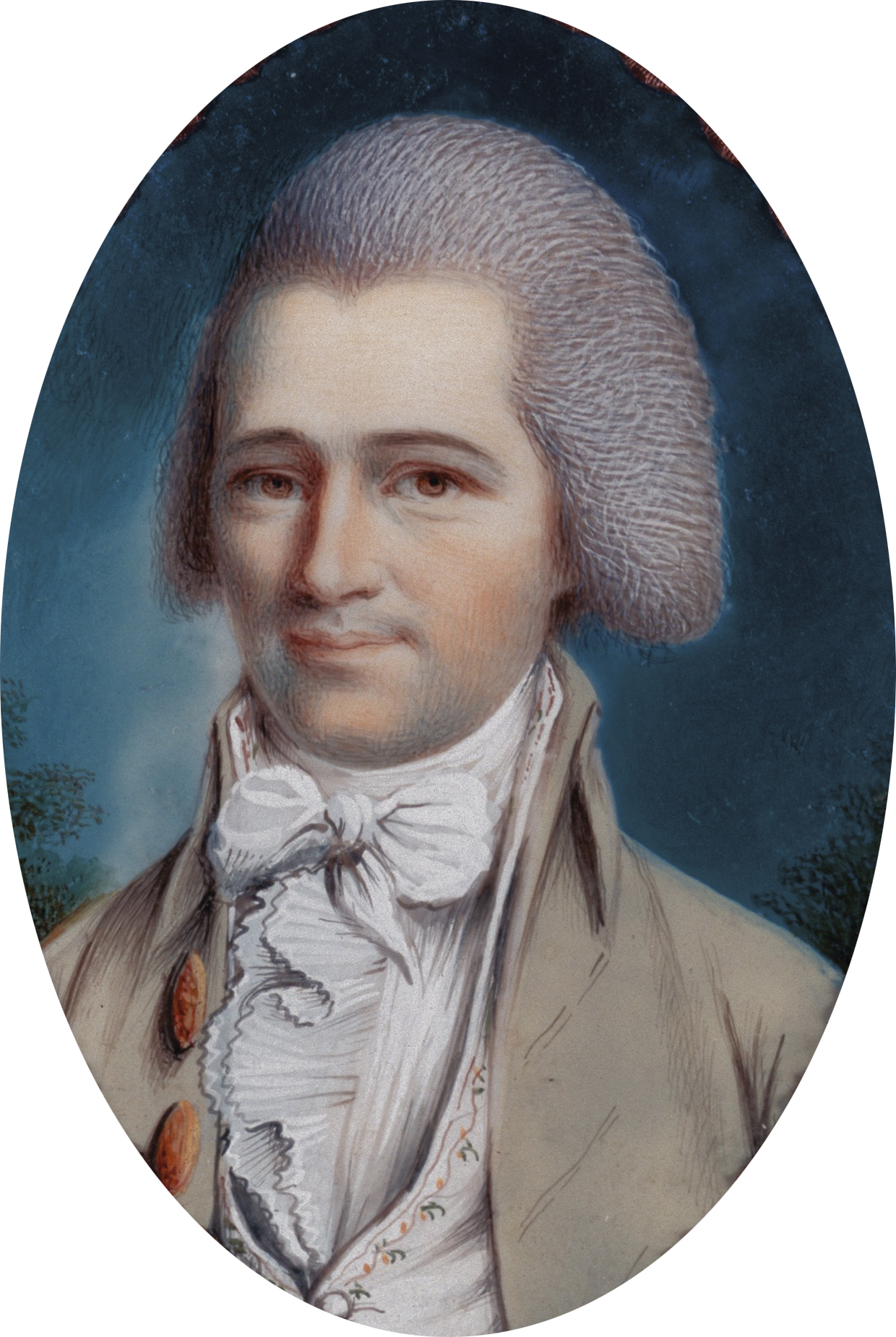
Portrait miniature of Elijah Boardman by John Ramage, c. 1790

In September 1795, Boardman became a member of the Connecticut Land Company, and a purchaser of the Connecticut Western Reserve – now part of northern Ohio – which entitled Boardman and his associates to two townships located there, one of which being Medina. The 227-acre (0.92 km^{2}) site set aside to create a county seat was originally named Mecca, until it was realised that a nearby town was named the same. Boardman's land agent, Rufus Ferris Sr., became the first resident of Medina, Together with his brothers, Boardman had thus became the owner of a "considerable" amount of real estate, among the post-Revolutionary War landed gentry "among the town's highest taxpayers." Boardman also owned a slave named Isabella.

=== Politics ===
Boardman's initial ventures into politics are recorded in a letter to then-President Thomas Jefferson on June 18, 1801. He included a sermon of the Rev. Stanley Griswold, of the New Milford church, which discussed the new president as "an example of how evil could be overcome by good." Jefferson subsequently replied with a detailed critique of the sermon.

Boardman became a member of the State House of Representatives for the period 1803–05 and again in 1816, before becoming a member of the State's upper house between 1817 and 1819, and a member of the State Senate between 1819 and 1821. On March 4, 1821, he was elected to the US Senate while living in Litchfield, Connecticut. He is listed by the Abridgment of the Debates of Congress, from 1789 to 1856 as having been present at Senate proceedings on December 3, 1821, in Washington DC in the company of Class-3 Connecticut senator James Lanman.

=== Later life and death ===
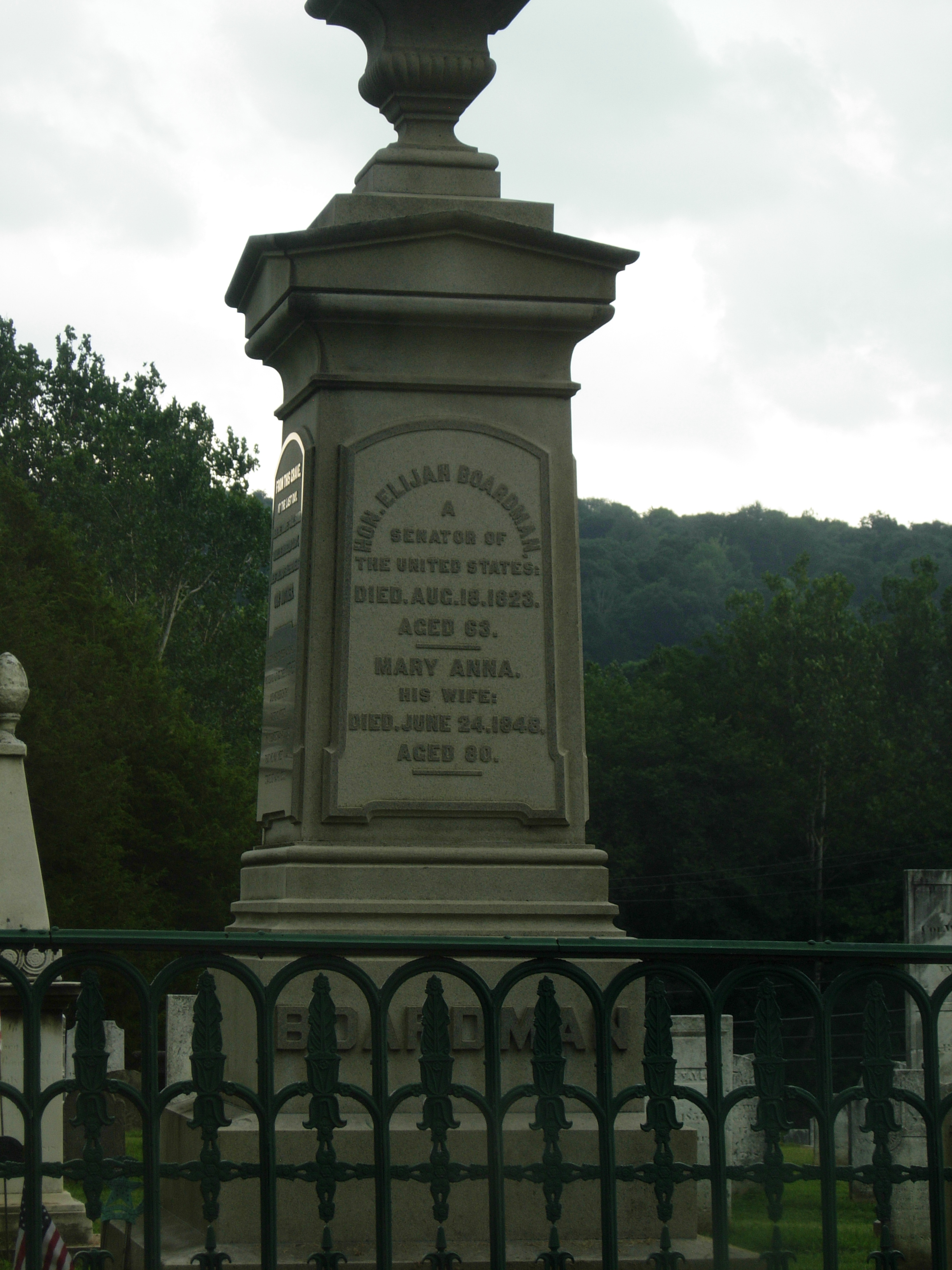
Elijah Boardman's gravestone in New Milford, Connecticut.

Boardman served in the Senate until his death during a visit to his son, whereupon he was succeeded by Henry W. Edwards. His cause of death is a subject of speculation, however biographer and son-in-law John Frederick Schroeder (m. Caroline Maria Boardman) related it while writing in 1849 to several bouts of cholera and fever Boardman had suffered throughout his life, particularly during a tour of Rhode Island in 1780, as well as other attacks in Vermont and New Hampshire. Senator James Lanman proposed on December 5, 1823, a motion for the members of the Senate to wear "the usual mourning" for thirty days to commemorate his death. Boardman's body was returned home and interred in New Milford. He was survived by his first son, later politician William, and his second, Henry Mason Boardman. Mabel Thorp Boardman, American philanthropist, was his great-granddaughter.

== See also ==
- List of members of the United States Congress who died in office (1790–1899)

== Notes ==
Party political offices
Vacant Title last held by Asa Spaulding	Democratic-Republican nominee for Governor of Connecticut; 1812, 1813, 1814, 1815	Succeeded by Oliver Wolcott Jr.
U.S. Senate
Preceded by Samuel W. Dana	U.S. Senator from Connecticut (class 1); March 4, 1821 – August 18, 1823	Succeeded by Henry W. Edwards
