= 1812 Connecticut gubernatorial election =

- April 13, 1812

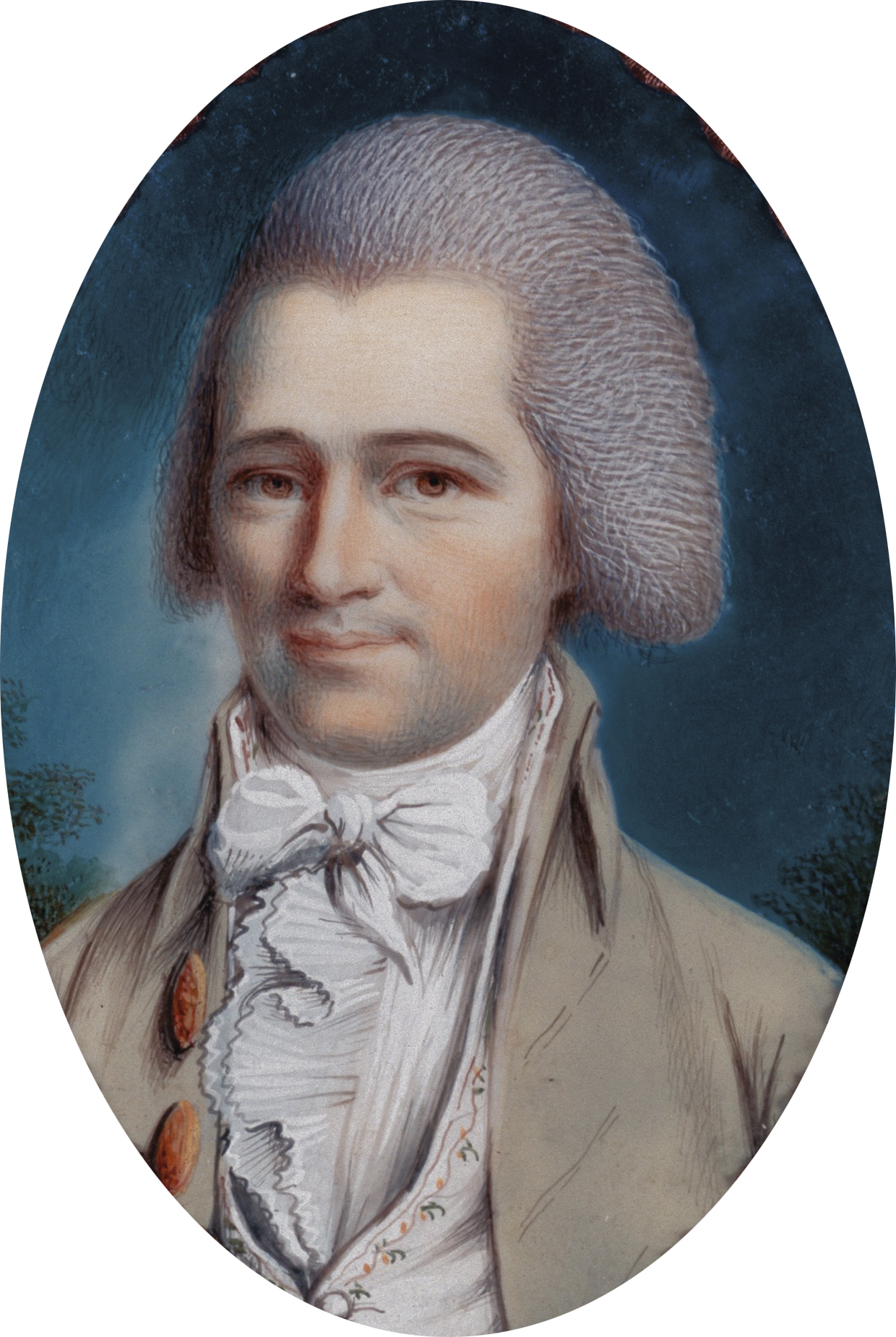
Nominee	Roger Griswold	Elijah Boardman
Party	Federalist	Democratic-Republican
Popular vote	11,721	1,748
Percentage	83.99%	12.52%
- County results Griswold: 70–80% >90%
Gov/ernor before election
Roger Griswold
Federalist
Elected Gov/ernor
Roger Griswold
Federalist

The 1812 Connecticut gubernatorial election took place on April 13, 1812.

Incumbent Federalist Governor Roger Griswold won re-election, defeating Democratic-Republican nominee Elijah Boardman with 83.99% of the vote.

== General election ==
=== Candidates ===
- Elijah Boardman, Democratic-Republican, former member of the Connecticut House of Representatives
- Roger Griswold, Federalist, incumbent Governor

=== Results ===
1812 Connecticut gubernatorial election (Note: Some source give Boardman's total as 1,487. This appears to be incorrect. Contemporary newspapers giving incomplete returns from 105 out of 119 towns record Boardman's total as 1,545.)
Party	Candidate	Votes	%	±%
Federalist	Roger Griswold (incumbent)	11,721	83.99%	
Democratic-Republican	Elijah Boardman	1,748	12.52%	
Scattering		487	3.49%	
Majority		9,973	71.47%	
Turnout		13,956		
Federalist hold		Swing		
