= Roger Griswold =

American lawyer, judge, and politician (1762–1812)

22nd Governor of Connecticut
- In office May 9, 1811 – October 25, 1812
- Lieutenant: John Cotton Smith
- Preceded by: John Treadwell
- Succeeded by: John Cotton Smith

Member of the U.S. House of Representatives from Connecticut's at-large district (seat D)
- In office March 4, 1795 – 1805
- Preceded by: Chauncey Goodrich
- Succeeded by: Nathaniel Smith

26th Lieutenant Governor of Connecticut
- In office October 20, 1809 – May 9, 1811
- Governor: John Treadwell
- Preceded by: John Treadwell
- Succeeded by: John Cotton Smith

Personal details
- Born: May 21, 1762 Lyme, Connecticut Colony, British America
- Died: October 25, 1812 (aged 50) Norwich, Connecticut, U.S.
- Party: Federalist
- Spouse(s): Fanny Rogers Griswold October 27, 1788(The Griswold Family of Connecticut, Part 3)
- Relations: Matthew Griswold and Roger Wolcott
- Children: 10
- Parent(s): Matthew Griswold and Ursula (Wolcott) Griswold
- Education: Yale College and Harvard University
- Occupation: Lawyer, Judge, Politician

Roger Griswold (/ˈɡrɪzwɔːld, -wəld/; May 21, 1762 – October 25, 1812) was a lawyer, politician and judge from Connecticut. He served as a member of the United States House of Representatives, judge of the Connecticut Supreme Court and the 22nd governor of Connecticut, serving as a Federalist. He was a member of the prominent Griswold family.

== Biography ==
Coat of arms of Matthew Griswold

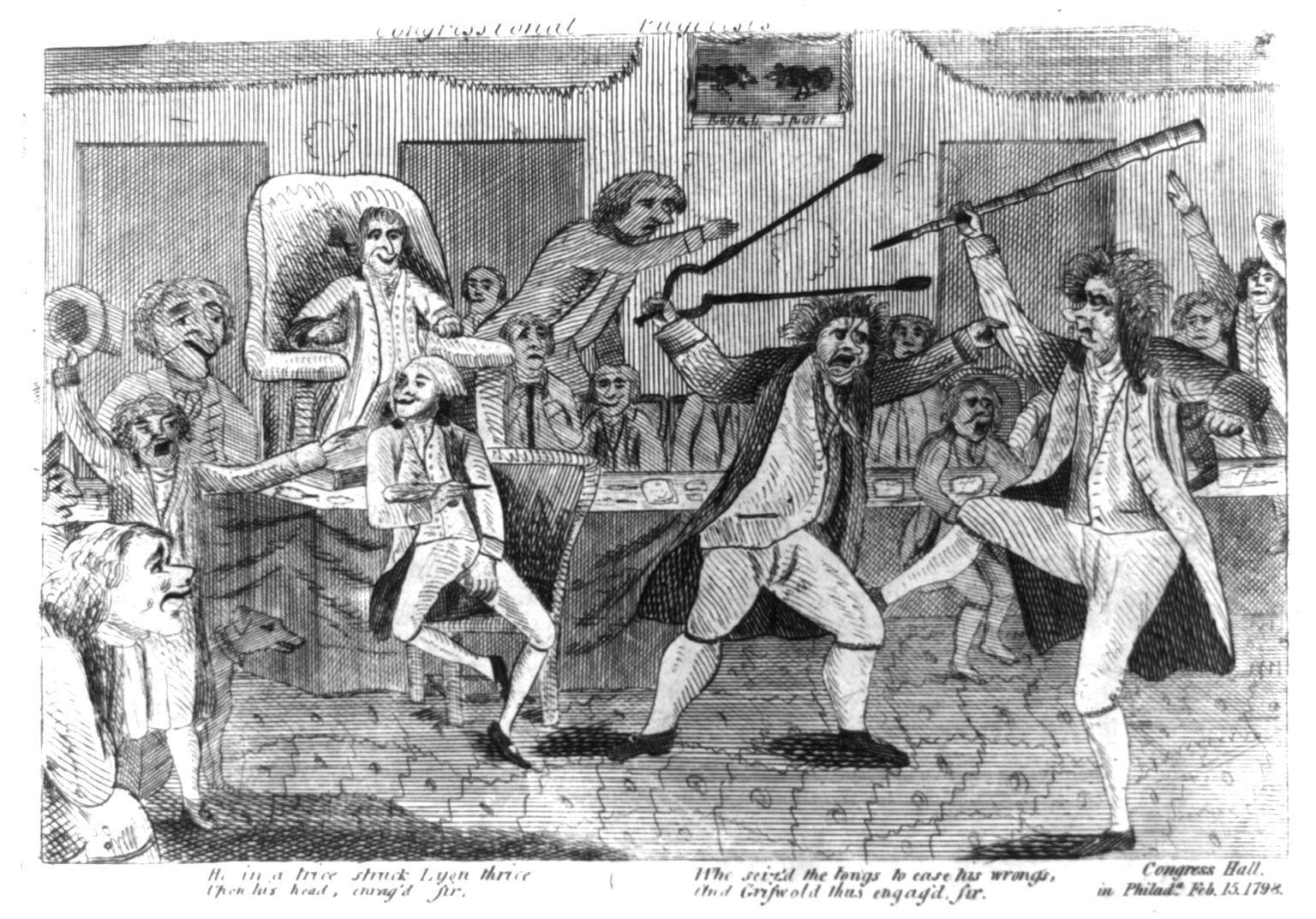
A political cartoon of the Lyon-Griswold brawl.

Griswold was born in Lyme in the Connecticut Colony to Matthew Griswold and Ursula (Wolcott) Griswold of the prominent Griswold family. He pursued classical studies, entered Yale College at the age of fourteen and graduated from Yale in 1780. He received a Doctor of Law degree from Harvard University in 1811, and a Doctor of Law degree from Yale in 1812.

Griswold studied law with his father and was admitted to the bar in 1783. He began the practice of law in Norwich, Connecticut, and unsuccessfully ran for Congress in an 1793 special election. He returned to Lyme in 1794 and was elected as a Federalist candidate to the Fourth United States Congress and to the five succeeding Congresses. Griswold served in Congress from March 4, 1795, until his resignation in 1805 prior to the convening of the Ninth Congress. During the Sixth Congress, he served as chairman of the Committee on Revisal and Unfinished Business and as a member of the Committee on Ways and Means. He was a U.S. Senate candidate in 1800.

In 1803 Griswold, along with several other New England Federalist politicians, proposed secession from the union due to the growing influence of Jeffersonian Democrats and the Louisiana Purchase, which they felt would dilute Northern influence. Griswold declined President John Adams' request for him to serve as the Secretary of War in 1801.

Griswold served as judge of the Supreme Court of Connecticut from 1807 to 1809. He was presidential elector on the Charles Cotesworth Pinckney and Rufus King ticket. He was the Lieutenant Governor of Connecticut from 1809 to 1811, and was the Governor of Connecticut from 1811 until his unexpected death in Norwich on October 25, 1812, at the age of 50. He is interred in Griswold Cemetery at Black Hall, in the town of Lyme (now Old Lyme, Connecticut). When Griswold, Connecticut, was incorporated in 1815, it was named in his honor.

== Lyon-Griswold brawl ==
On 30th January, 1798, Representative Griswold heard another representative, Matthew Lyon, a Jeffersonian Republican from Vermont, insulting the Connecticut House members. Griswold walked over to Lyon and spoke to him, relating to a "wooden sword"(a comment on Matthew Lyon having been temporarily discharged from the Continental Army), before repeating the statement. Lyon then spit at Griswold in the face.

After the vote to expel Lyon failed to pass, Griswold, on 15th February, 1798, struck Lyon, who was at his desk, with a cane repeatedly. Lyon managed to escape his desk and acquire a pair of tongs, beginning to brawl with Lyon. They eventually ended up on the floor and would be separated. The vote to oust Lyon and Griswold was rejected.

== Personal life ==
Griswold's father Matthew Griswold was the 17th governor of Connecticut from 1784 to 1786.
Griswold's maternal grandfather Roger Wolcott was the colonial governor of Connecticut from 1751 to 1754.

Griswold married Fanny Rogers on October 27, 1798, and they had ten children together.

His grandson, Matthew Griswold, served as a state representative in Connecticut in the 1860s, and was later elected to two terms in Congress from Pennsylvania in the 1890s.

His great-grandson was Francis Joseph Hall (1857–1932).

Party political offices
Preceded by John Treadwell	Federalist nominee for Governor of Connecticut; 1812	Succeeded by John Cotton Smith
U.S. House of Representatives
Preceded by Jonathan Trumbull, Jr.	Member of the U.S. House of Representatives from Connecticut's at-large congressional district 1795–1805	Succeeded by Timothy Pitkin
Political offices
Preceded by John Treadwell	Lieutenant Governor of Connecticut; 1809–1811	Succeeded by John C. Smith
Preceded by John Treadwell	Governor of Connecticut; 1811–1812	Succeeded by John C. Smith
