= John Treadwell =

American politician (1745–1823)

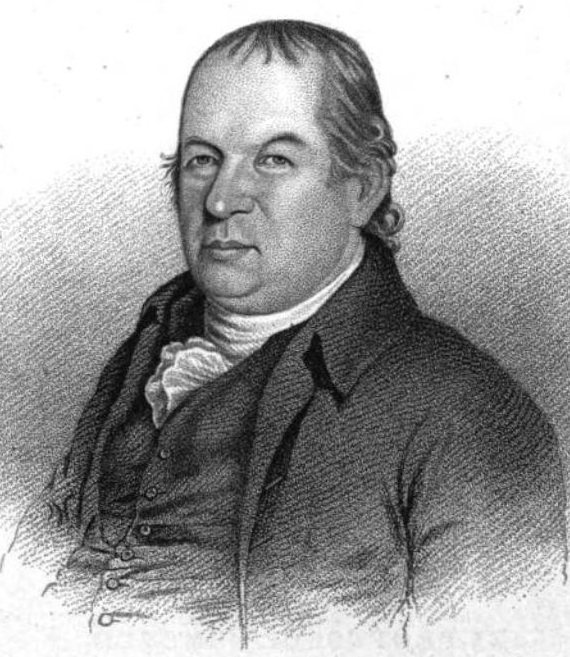

21st Governor of Connecticut
- In office August 7, 1809 – May 9, 1811
- Lieutenant: Roger Griswold
- Preceded by: Jonathan Trumbull Jr.
- Succeeded by: Roger Griswold

25th Lieutenant Governor of Connecticut
- In office December 1, 1797 – August 7, 1809
- Governor: Jonathan Trumbull Jr.
- Preceded by: Jonathan Trumbull Jr.
- Succeeded by: Roger Griswold

Personal details
- Born: November 23, 1745 Farmington, Connecticut, U.S.
- Died: August 18, 1823 (aged 77) Farmington, Connecticut, U.S.
- Party: Federalist
- Spouse: Dorothy Pomeroy Treadwell
- Education: Yale University
- Occupation: lawyer; politician; judge

John Treadwell (November 23, 1745 – August 18, 1823) was an American politician and the 21st governor of Connecticut.

== Biography ==
Treadwell was born in Farmington, Connecticut the only son of Ephraim and Mary (Porter) Treadwell, on November 23, 1745. He graduated from Yale University in 1767. He then studied law with Judge Titus Hosmer in Middletown, was admitted to the bar and practiced law in Farmington. On November 20, 1770, John Treadwell married Dorothy Pomroy, of Northampton, Massachusetts. They had four daughters, Dolle 1st, who died at just three years of age; Dolle 2nd; Eunice; and Mary, and two sons, George and John.

== Career ==
Treadwell served as a member of the General Assembly from 1776 to 1783. He was then elevated to the governor's council. He held that position until 1783. He was elected to the Confederation Congress in 1784, 1785, and 1787, but did not attend. He was a member of Connecticut council of assistants from 1786 to 1798. From 1786 to 1797 he served as Judge of the Court of Common Pleas. In 1788 he was a Delegate to the state convention that ratified the US Constitution. In 1789 Treadwell became Judge of the Probate Court and the Supreme Court of Errors, serving until 1809. He was elected a Fellow of the American Academy of Arts and Sciences in 1805. Treadwell unsuccessfully ran for Connecticut's at-large congressional district at least 5 times between 1788 and 1800, with his best performance coming in the September 1797 special election where he was a distant runner-up to William Edmond.

In 1798, Treadwell was elected the Lieutenant Governor of Connecticut, an office he also held until 1809. Jonathan Trumbull, the Governor of Connecticut, died in office on August 7, 1809. Treadwell, lieutenant governor at the time, assumed the governor's office. He was elected by popular vote on April 9, 1810, to the governorship. During his term, the Hartford Fire Insurance Company was proposed, and the Non-Intercourse Act was reinstated in February 1811, which resulted from Connecticut's opposition to the United States's impending war with Great Britain.

Treadwell left office on May 9, 1811 after an unsuccessful re-election bid. In 1814-15 he was a Connecticut delegate to the Hartford Convention. He was a member of the 1818 Constitutional Convention and also served on the American Board of Commissioners for Foreign Missions.

== Death ==
Treadwell, a Congregationalist, died in Farmington, Hartford County, Connecticut, on August 18, 1823 (age 77 years, 268 days). He is interred at Farmington Old Cemetery. He was a founder of the Connecticut Missionary Society, the missionary arm of the Connecticut General Association of Congregational ministers.

Party political offices
Preceded by Jonathan Trumbull Jr.	Federalist nominee for Governor of Connecticut; 1810, 1811	Succeeded by Roger Griswold
Political offices
Preceded by Jonathan Trumbull, Jr.	Lieutenant Governor of Connecticut; 1798–1809	Succeeded by Roger Griswold
Preceded by Jonathan Trumbull, Jr.	Governor of Connecticut; 1809–1811	Succeeded by Roger Griswold
