= 1802–03 United States House of Representatives elections =

House elections for the 8th U.S. Congress

- April 26, 1802 – December 14, 1803

All 142 seats in the United States House of Representatives 72 seats needed for a majority
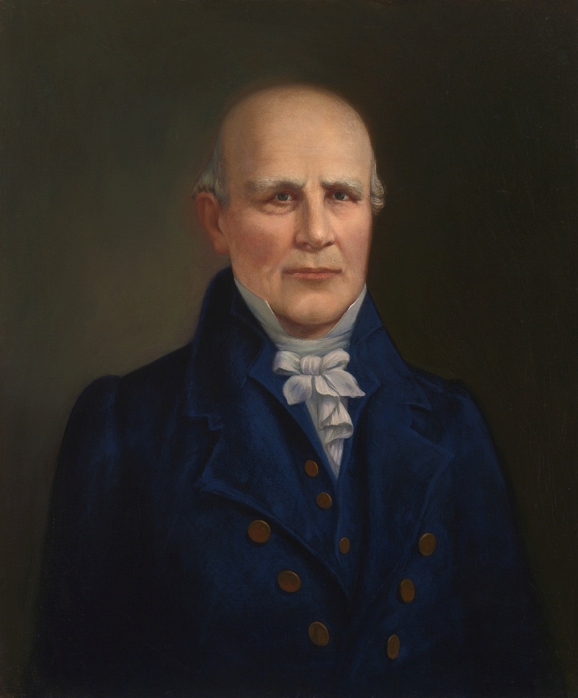

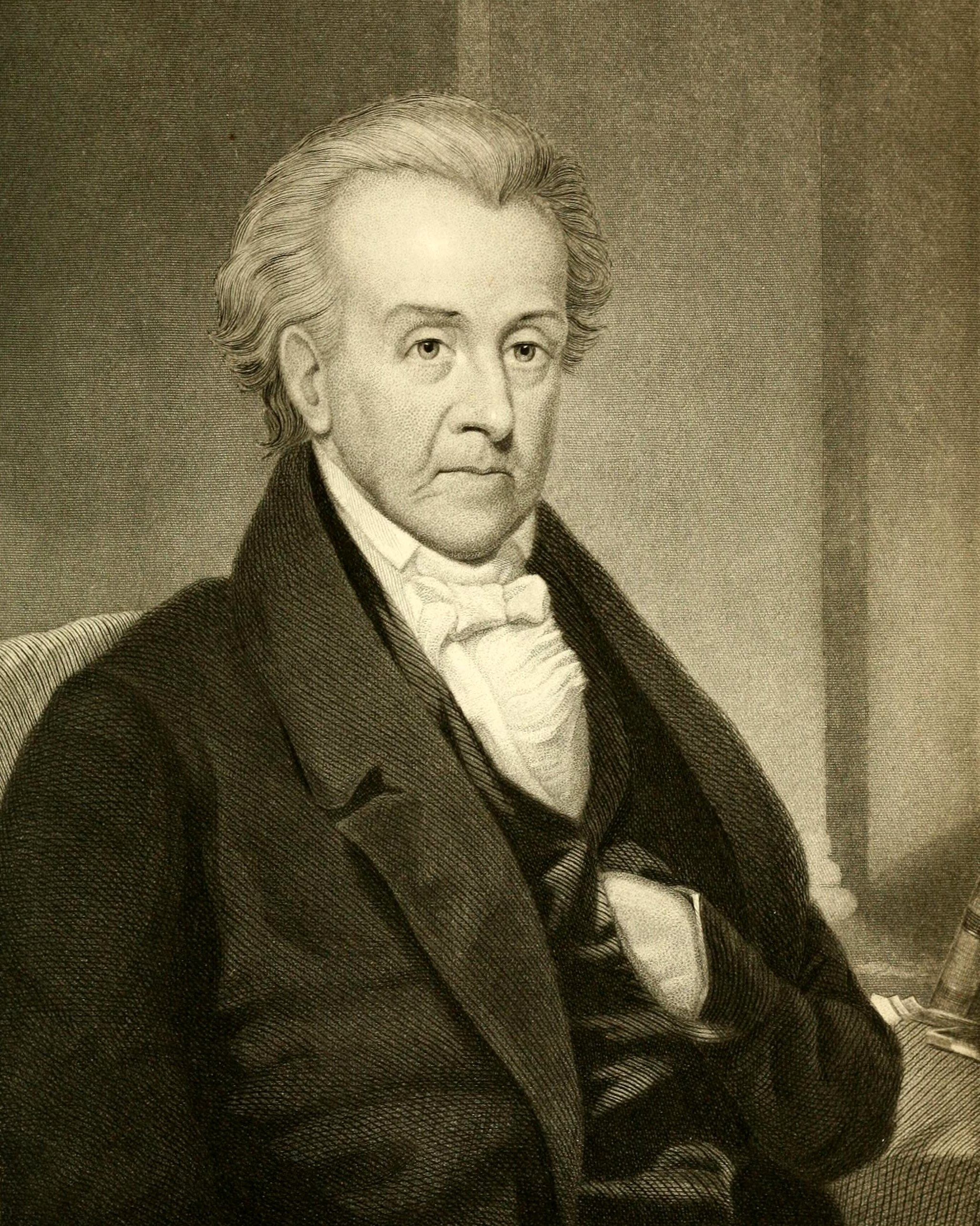
	Majority party	Minority party
Leader	Nathaniel Macon	John Cotton Smith
Party	Democratic-Republican	Federalist
Leader's seat	North Carolina 6th	Connecticut at-large
Last election	68 seats	38 seats
Seats won	103	39
Seat change	▲35	▲1
- Results: Federalist hold Federalist gain Democratic-Republican hold Democratic-Republican gain Undistricted
Speaker before election
Nathaniel Macon
Democratic-Republican
Elected Speaker
Nathaniel Macon
Democratic-Republican

The 1802–03 United States House of Representatives elections were held on various dates in various states between April 26, 1802 (in New York) and December 14, 1803 (in New Jersey). Each state set its own date for its elections to the House of Representatives, either before or after the first session of the 8th United States Congress convened on October 17, 1803. They occurred during President Thomas Jefferson's first term in office.

With the addition of the new state of Ohio's representatives, and the congressional reapportionment based on the 1800 United States census, the size of the House increased from 106 to 142 seats. The greatest population growth revealed in the 1800 census was in territories that constituted the western regions of the country at the time, a tremendous boost for Democratic-Republican candidates. Nearly all of the new seats created in the reapportionment went to Democratic-Republicans, closely aligned as they were with the agrarian interests of Western farmers. As a result, the Democratic-Republicans won the largest proportion of seats that either they or the competing Federalists had ever been able to secure in any earlier Congress, a supermajority greater than two-thirds of the total number.

== Election summaries ==
These elections were the first following reapportionment after the 1800 census. Thirty-five new seats were added in reapportionment, with three states having no change in apportionment, and thirteen states gaining between 1 and 7 seats. One further seat was added for the new state of Ohio, which is included in this table below.

↓
102	40
Democratic-Republican	Federalist

State	Type	Date	Total seats		Democratic- Republican		Federalist	
State	Type	Date	Seats	Change	Seats	Change	Seats	Change
New York	Districts	April 26–29, 1802	17	▲7	12	▲6	5	▲1
Connecticut	At-large	August 20, 1802	7	Steady	0	Steady	7	Steady
New Hampshire	At-large	August 30, 1802	5	▲1	0	Steady	5	▲1
Rhode Island	At-large	August 31, 1802	2	Steady	2	Steady	0	Steady
Georgia	At-large	October 4, 1802	4	▲2	4	▲2	0	Steady
Delaware	At-large	October 5, 1802	1	Steady	1	▲1	0	▼1
Pennsylvania	Districts	October 12, 1802	18	▲5	18	▲8	0	▼3
Massachusetts	District	November 1, 1802 (Note: Majority required for election, which requirement was not met in one district, necessitating two additional trials held on January 24 and April 3, 1803)	17	▲3	7	Steady	10	▲3
Vermont	Districts	December 13, 1802 (Note: Majority required for election, which was not met in two districts. Two additional elections were required to achieve a majority, held on March 1 and May 9, 1803)	4	▲2	1	Steady	3	▲2
Maryland	Districts	January 1, 1803	9	▲1	6	▲1	3	Steady
South Carolina	Districts	February 3, 1803	8	▲2	6	▲3	2	▼1
Late elections (After the March 4, 1803, beginning of Congress)
Virginia	Districts	April 1803	22	▲3	18	Steady	4	▲3
Kentucky	Districts	August 2, 1803	6	▲4	6	▲4	0	Steady
Tennessee	At-large	August 5, 1803	3	▲2	3	▲2	0	Steady
North Carolina	Districts	August 15, 1803	12	▲2	11	▲5	1	▼3
Very late elections (After the October 17, 1803, beginning of 1st session)
New Jersey	At-large	December 14, 1803	6	▲1	6	▲1	0	Steady
Election of new state during 8th Congress
Ohio	At-large	June 21, 1803	1	▲1	1	▲1	0	Steady
Total			142	▲36	102 71.8%	▲34	40 28.2%	▲2

House seats
Dem-Republican	72.54%
Federalist	27.46%

== Special elections ==
There were special elections in 1802 and 1803 during the 7th United States Congress and 8th United States Congress.

Elections are sorted here by date then district.

=== 7th Congress ===
District	Incumbent			This race	
District	Member / Delegate	Party	First elected	Results	Candidates
Maryland 2	Richard Sprigg Jr.	Democratic- Republican	1801	Incumbent resigned February 11, 1802. New member elected March 2, 1802 and seated March 24, 1802. Democratic-Republican hold. Winner was later elected to the next term; see below.	▌ ✓ Walter Bowie (Democratic-Republican); Unopposed
South Carolina 4	Thomas Sumter	Democratic- Republican	1788; 1792 (lost); 1796	Incumbent resigned December 15, 1801, when elected U.S. senator. New member elected April 13, 1802 and seated January 24, 1803. Democratic-Republican hold.	▌ ✓ Richard Winn (Democratic-Republican) 98.7%; ▌John Kershaw (None) 1.3%
Georgia at-large	Benjamin Taliaferro	Democratic- Republican	1798	Incumbent resigned sometime in 1802. New member elected April 26, 1802 and seated December 6, 1802. Democratic-Republican hold.	▌ ✓ David Meriwether (Democratic-Republican) 86.95%; ▌Samuel Hammond 7.72%; ▌William Bryant 2.94%; Others: ▌Francis Willis 1.02%; ▌William Stith 0.81%; ▌Thomas P. Carnes 0.34%; ▌James MacNeil 0.21%
Massachusetts 12	Silas Lee	Federalist	1798	Incumbent resigned August 20, 1801. New member elected July 29, 1802 and seated December 6, 1802. Federalist hold.	First ballot (September 25, 1801): ▌Orchard Cook (Democratic-Republican) 47.9%; ▌Martin Kingsley (Democratic-Republican) 23.6%; ▌Nathaniel Drummer (Unknown) 24.1%; Scattering 4.3%; Second ballot (December 7, 1801): ▌Orchard Cook (Democratic-Republican) 42.5%; ▌Martin Kingsley (Democratic-Republican) 34.2%; ▌Phineas Bruce (Federalist) 7.1%; ▌Nathaniel Drummer (Unknown) 16.2%; Third ballot (April 5, 1802): ▌Orchard Cook (Democratic-Republican) 45.0%; ▌Martin Kingsley (Democratic-Republican) 32.4%; ▌Phineas Bruce (Federalist) 13.3%; ▌Nathaniel Drummer (Unknown) 9.2%; Fourth ballot (June 7, 1802): ▌Samuel Thatcher (Federalist) 33.0%; ▌Martin Kingsley (Democratic-Republican) 45.0%; ▌Phineas Bruce (Federalist) 8.3%; Scattering 13.6%; Fifth ballot (July 29, 1802): ▌ ✓ Samuel Thatcher (Federalist) 59.3%; ▌Martin Kingsley (Democratic-Republican) 40.7%
New Hampshire at-large	Joseph Peirce	Federalist	1800	Incumbent resigned sometime in 1802. New member elected August 30, 1802 and seated December 6, 1802. Federalist hold. Winner also elected to the next term; see below.	▌ ✓ Samuel Hunt (Federalist) 55.8%; ▌Nahum Parker (Democratic-Republican) 41.1%; Scattering 3.1%
Mississippi Territory at-large	Narsworthy Hunter	Democratic- Republican	1801	Incumbent died March 11, 1802. New delegate elected August 1, 1802 and seated December 6, 1802. Democratic-Republican hold. Winner was not elected to the next term; see below.	▌ ✓ Thomas M. Green Jr. (Democratic-Republican); Unopposed
North Carolina 8	Charles Johnson	Democratic- Republican	1800	Incumbent died July 23, 1802. New member elected October 15, 1802 and seated December 7, 1802. Democratic-Republican hold.	▌ ✓ Thomas Wynns (Democratic-Republican) (Note: Mistakenly listed as a Federalist in source) 57.7%; ▌Thomas Johnston (Democratic-Republican) 25.1%; ▌Lemuel Sawyer (Democratic-Republican) 17.2%
Georgia at-large	John Milledge	Democratic- Republican	1794	Incumbent resigned May 1802 to become Governor of Georgia. New member elected December 15, 1802 and seated January 10, 1803. Democratic-Republican hold.	▌ ✓ Peter Early (Democratic-Republican) 69.11%; ▌Joseph Bryan (Democratic-Republican) 30.45%; ▌Matthew MacAlister (Federalist) 0.29%; ▌Cowles Mead (Democratic-Republican) 0.09%

=== 8th Congress ===
District	Incumbent			This race	
District	Member	Party	First elected	Results	Candidates
New York 7	John Cantine	Democratic- Republican	1802	Incumbent resigned before the Congress began. New member elected April 28, 1803 and seated October 17, 1803. Democratic-Republican hold.	▌ ✓ Josiah Hasbrouck (Democratic-Republican) 53.3%; ▌Conrad E. Elmendorf (Federalist) 46.7%
Connecticut at-large	Elias Perkins	Federalist	1800	Incumbent chose not to serve. New member elected September 5, 1803 and seated October 17, 1803. Federalist hold.	▌ ✓ Simeon Baldwin (Federalist) 62.84%; ▌William Hart (Democratic-Republican) 36.73%; Scattering 0.43%
New York 6	Isaac Bloom	Democratic- Republican	1802	Incumbent died April 26, 1803. New member elected September 16, 1803 and seated October 17, 1803. Democratic-Republican hold.	▌ ✓ Daniel C. Verplanck (Democratic-Republican) 57.4%; ▌Benjamin Akin (Federalist) 43.6%
Georgia at-large	John Milledge	Democratic- Republican	1794	Incumbent chose not to serve, having been elected Governor of Georgia. New member elected October 3, 1803 and seated October 17, 1803. Democratic-Republican hold.	▌ ✓ Joseph Bryan (Democratic-Republican) 71.3%; ▌Matthew MacAlister (Federalist) 19.6%; ▌Cowles Mead (Democratic-Republican) 9.1%

== Connecticut ==
District	Incumbent			This race	
District	Member	Party	First elected	Results	Candidates (Note: Only candidates with at least 1% of the vote listed)
Connecticut at-large 7 seats on a general ticket	John Cotton Smith	Federalist	1800	Incumbent re-elected.	▌ ✓ John Cotton Smith (Federalist) 15.8%; ▌ ✓ Benjamin Tallmadge (Federalist) 13.3%; ▌ ✓ Samuel W. Dana (Federalist) 13.1%; ▌ ✓ Elias Perkins (Federalist) 12.6%; ▌ ✓ Calvin Goddard (Federalist) 12.2%; ▌ ✓ Roger Griswold (Federalist) 11.9%; ▌ ✓ John Davenport (Federalist) 9.7%; ▌Simeon Baldwin (Federalist) 7.3%; ▌Timothy Pitkin (Federalist) 1.5%
Connecticut at-large 7 seats on a general ticket	Benjamin Tallmadge	Federalist	1801 (special)	Incumbent re-elected.	▌ ✓ John Cotton Smith (Federalist) 15.8%; ▌ ✓ Benjamin Tallmadge (Federalist) 13.3%; ▌ ✓ Samuel W. Dana (Federalist) 13.1%; ▌ ✓ Elias Perkins (Federalist) 12.6%; ▌ ✓ Calvin Goddard (Federalist) 12.2%; ▌ ✓ Roger Griswold (Federalist) 11.9%; ▌ ✓ John Davenport (Federalist) 9.7%; ▌Simeon Baldwin (Federalist) 7.3%; ▌Timothy Pitkin (Federalist) 1.5%
Connecticut at-large 7 seats on a general ticket	Samuel W. Dana	Federalist	1796	Incumbent re-elected.	▌ ✓ John Cotton Smith (Federalist) 15.8%; ▌ ✓ Benjamin Tallmadge (Federalist) 13.3%; ▌ ✓ Samuel W. Dana (Federalist) 13.1%; ▌ ✓ Elias Perkins (Federalist) 12.6%; ▌ ✓ Calvin Goddard (Federalist) 12.2%; ▌ ✓ Roger Griswold (Federalist) 11.9%; ▌ ✓ John Davenport (Federalist) 9.7%; ▌Simeon Baldwin (Federalist) 7.3%; ▌Timothy Pitkin (Federalist) 1.5%
Connecticut at-large 7 seats on a general ticket	Elias Perkins	Federalist	1800	Incumbent re-elected but declined to serve, causing a special election.	▌ ✓ John Cotton Smith (Federalist) 15.8%; ▌ ✓ Benjamin Tallmadge (Federalist) 13.3%; ▌ ✓ Samuel W. Dana (Federalist) 13.1%; ▌ ✓ Elias Perkins (Federalist) 12.6%; ▌ ✓ Calvin Goddard (Federalist) 12.2%; ▌ ✓ Roger Griswold (Federalist) 11.9%; ▌ ✓ John Davenport (Federalist) 9.7%; ▌Simeon Baldwin (Federalist) 7.3%; ▌Timothy Pitkin (Federalist) 1.5%
Connecticut at-large 7 seats on a general ticket	Calvin Goddard	Federalist	1801 (special)	Incumbent re-elected.	▌ ✓ John Cotton Smith (Federalist) 15.8%; ▌ ✓ Benjamin Tallmadge (Federalist) 13.3%; ▌ ✓ Samuel W. Dana (Federalist) 13.1%; ▌ ✓ Elias Perkins (Federalist) 12.6%; ▌ ✓ Calvin Goddard (Federalist) 12.2%; ▌ ✓ Roger Griswold (Federalist) 11.9%; ▌ ✓ John Davenport (Federalist) 9.7%; ▌Simeon Baldwin (Federalist) 7.3%; ▌Timothy Pitkin (Federalist) 1.5%
Connecticut at-large 7 seats on a general ticket	Roger Griswold	Federalist	1794	Incumbent re-elected.	▌ ✓ John Cotton Smith (Federalist) 15.8%; ▌ ✓ Benjamin Tallmadge (Federalist) 13.3%; ▌ ✓ Samuel W. Dana (Federalist) 13.1%; ▌ ✓ Elias Perkins (Federalist) 12.6%; ▌ ✓ Calvin Goddard (Federalist) 12.2%; ▌ ✓ Roger Griswold (Federalist) 11.9%; ▌ ✓ John Davenport (Federalist) 9.7%; ▌Simeon Baldwin (Federalist) 7.3%; ▌Timothy Pitkin (Federalist) 1.5%
Connecticut at-large 7 seats on a general ticket	John Davenport	Federalist	1798	Incumbent re-elected.	▌ ✓ John Cotton Smith (Federalist) 15.8%; ▌ ✓ Benjamin Tallmadge (Federalist) 13.3%; ▌ ✓ Samuel W. Dana (Federalist) 13.1%; ▌ ✓ Elias Perkins (Federalist) 12.6%; ▌ ✓ Calvin Goddard (Federalist) 12.2%; ▌ ✓ Roger Griswold (Federalist) 11.9%; ▌ ✓ John Davenport (Federalist) 9.7%; ▌Simeon Baldwin (Federalist) 7.3%; ▌Timothy Pitkin (Federalist) 1.5%

== Delaware ==
District	Incumbent			This race	
District	Member	Party	First elected	Results	Candidates
Delaware at-large	James A. Bayard	Federalist	1796	Incumbent lost re-election. Democratic-Republican gain.	▌ ✓ Caesar A. Rodney (Democratic-Republican) 50.1%; ▌James A. Bayard (Federalist) 49.9%

== Georgia ==
Georgia gained 2 seats in reapportionment after the 1800 census. It elected its representatives October 4, 1802, at-large on a general ticket.

District	Incumbent			This race	
District	Member	Party	First elected	Results	Candidates
Georgia at-large 4 seats on a general ticket	John Milledge	Democratic-Republican	1801 (special)	Incumbent resigned in May 1802, causing a December 15, 1802, special election. Incumbent re-elected, but declined the seat, causing an October 3, 1803, special election.	▌ ✓ John Milledge (Democratic-Republican) 21.2%; ▌ ✓ David Meriwether (Democratic-Republican) 20.2%; ▌ ✓ Peter Early (Democratic-Republican) 19.0%; ▌ ✓ Samuel Hammond (Democratic-Republican) 13.2%; ▌Joseph Bryan (Democratic-Republican) 11.7%; ▌Francis Willis (Democratic-Republican) 8.1%; ▌Matthew MacAlister (Federalist) 6.6%
Georgia at-large 4 seats on a general ticket	David Meriwether	Democratic-Republican	1802 (special)	Incumbent re-elected.	▌ ✓ John Milledge (Democratic-Republican) 21.2%; ▌ ✓ David Meriwether (Democratic-Republican) 20.2%; ▌ ✓ Peter Early (Democratic-Republican) 19.0%; ▌ ✓ Samuel Hammond (Democratic-Republican) 13.2%; ▌Joseph Bryan (Democratic-Republican) 11.7%; ▌Francis Willis (Democratic-Republican) 8.1%; ▌Matthew MacAlister (Federalist) 6.6%
Georgia at-large 4 seats on a general ticket	None (new seat)			New seat. Democratic-Republican gain.	▌ ✓ John Milledge (Democratic-Republican) 21.2%; ▌ ✓ David Meriwether (Democratic-Republican) 20.2%; ▌ ✓ Peter Early (Democratic-Republican) 19.0%; ▌ ✓ Samuel Hammond (Democratic-Republican) 13.2%; ▌Joseph Bryan (Democratic-Republican) 11.7%; ▌Francis Willis (Democratic-Republican) 8.1%; ▌Matthew MacAlister (Federalist) 6.6%
Georgia at-large 4 seats on a general ticket	None (new seat)			New seat. Democratic-Republican gain.	▌ ✓ John Milledge (Democratic-Republican) 21.2%; ▌ ✓ David Meriwether (Democratic-Republican) 20.2%; ▌ ✓ Peter Early (Democratic-Republican) 19.0%; ▌ ✓ Samuel Hammond (Democratic-Republican) 13.2%; ▌Joseph Bryan (Democratic-Republican) 11.7%; ▌Francis Willis (Democratic-Republican) 8.1%; ▌Matthew MacAlister (Federalist) 6.6%

== Kentucky ==
Kentucky gained 4 seats to 6 in reapportionment after the 1800 census.

District	Incumbent			This race	
District	Member	Party	First elected	Results	Candidates
Kentucky 1	Thomas T. Davis	Democratic- Republican	1797	Incumbent retired. Democratic-Republican hold.	▌ ✓ Matthew Lyon (Democratic-Republican) 51.0%; ▌David Walker (Democratic-Republican) 49.0%
Kentucky 2	None (new district)			New seat. Democratic-Republican gain.	▌ ✓ John Boyle (Democratic-Republican); Unopposed
Kentucky 3	None (new district)			New seat. Democratic-Republican gain.	▌ ✓ Matthew Walton (Democratic-Republican); Unopposed
Kentucky 4	None (new district)			New seat. Democratic-Republican gain.	▌ ✓ Thomas Sandford (Democratic-Republican) 43.2%; ▌William Henry (Democratic-Republican) 27.5%; ▌Richard M. Johnson (Democratic-Republican) 24.9%; ▌Joseph H. Daviess (Federalist) 4.4%
Kentucky 5	John Fowler; Redistricted from the 2nd district	Democratic- Republican	1797	Incumbent re-elected.	▌ ✓ John Fowler (Democratic-Republican); Unopposed
Kentucky 6	None (new district)			New seat. Democratic-Republican gain.	▌ ✓ George M. Bedinger (Democratic-Republican) 57.8%; ▌Philemon Thomas (Democratic-Republican) 32.0%; ▌George Culp (Democratic-Republican) 10.2%

== Maryland ==
Maryland gained 1 seat in reapportionment after the 1800 census. Rather than increasing the number of districts, however, Maryland made the Maryland 5 a plural district with 2 seats.

District	Incumbent			This race	
District	Member	Party	First elected	Results	Candidates
Maryland 1	John Campbell	Federalist	1801	Incumbent re-elected.	▌ ✓ John Campbell (Federalist) 79.5%; ▌William Thomas (Democratic-Republican) 20.5%
Maryland 2	Walter Bowie	Democratic-Republican	1802 (special)	Incumbent re-elected.	▌ ✓ Walter Bowie (Democratic-Republican) 99.5%; Others 0.5%
Maryland 3	Thomas Plater	Federalist	1801	Incumbent re-elected.	▌ ✓ Thomas Plater (Federalist) 51.9%; ▌Patrick Magruder (Democratic-Republican) 41.7%; ▌Richard Wooten (Federalist) 6.4%
Maryland 4	Daniel Hiester	Democratic-Republican	1788 (Pennsylvania); 1801	Incumbent re-elected.	▌ ✓ Daniel Hiester (Democratic-Republican) 60.0%; ▌Eli Williams (Federalist) 40.0%
Maryland 5 Plural district with 2 seats	Samuel Smith	Democratic-Republican	1792	Incumbent retired to run for Senate. Democratic-Republican hold.	▌ ✓ Nicholas R. Moore (Democratic-Republican) 53.8%; ▌ ✓ William McCreery (Democratic-Republican) 38.3%; ▌George Buchanan (Federalist) 7.8%
Maryland 5 Plural district with 2 seats	None (new seat)			New seat. Democratic-Republican gain.	▌ ✓ Nicholas R. Moore (Democratic-Republican) 53.8%; ▌ ✓ William McCreery (Democratic-Republican) 38.3%; ▌George Buchanan (Federalist) 7.8%
Maryland 6	John Archer	Democratic-Republican	1801	Incumbent re-elected.	▌ ✓ John Archer (Democratic-Republican) 100.0%
Maryland 7	Joseph H. Nicholson	Democratic-Republican	1798 (special)	Incumbent re-elected.	▌ ✓ Joseph H. Nicholson (Democratic-Republican) 99.6%; Others 0.4%
Maryland 8	John Dennis	Federalist	1796	Incumbent re-elected.	▌ ✓ John Dennis (Federalist) 94.9%; ▌Joshua Prideaux (Democratic-Republican) 3.4%; ▌Samuel Heath 1.1%; Others 0.7%

== Massachusetts ==
Massachusetts increased 3 seats to 17 in reapportionment after the 1800 census. Massachusetts law at the time required a majority for election to an office, which requirement was not met in the 6th district, requiring two additional ballots.

District	Incumbent			This race	
District	Member	Party	First elected	Results	Candidates
Massachusetts 1 "Suffolk district"	William Eustis; Redistricted from the 8th district	Democratic- Republican	1800	Incumbent re-elected.	▌ ✓ William Eustis (Democratic-Republican) 50.8%; ▌John Quincy Adams (Federalist) 49.2%
Massachusetts 2 "Essex South district"	Nathan Read; Redistricted from the 10th district	Federalist	1800 (special)	Incumbent retired. Democratic-Republican gain.	▌ ✓ Jacob Crowninshield (Democratic-Republican) 51.9%; ▌Timothy Pickering (Federalist) 48.0%
Massachusetts 3 "Essex North district"	Manasseh Cutler; Redistricted from the 11th district	Federalist	1800	Incumbent re-elected.	▌ ✓ Manasseh Cutler (Federalist) 75.5%; ▌Thomas Kitteridge (Democratic-Republican) 21.4%; Others 3.1%
Massachusetts 4 "Middlesex district"	Joseph Bradley Varnum; Redistricted from the 9th district	Democratic- Republican	1795	Incumbent re-elected.	▌ ✓ Joseph Bradley Varnum (Democratic-Republican) 70.1%; ▌Timothy Bigelow (Federalist) 27.7%; ▌Samuel Kendall (Federalist) 1.8%
Massachusetts 5 "Hampshire South district"	William Shepard; Redistricted from the 2nd district	Federalist	1797	Incumbent retired. Federalist hold.	▌ ✓ Thomas Dwight (Federalist) 78.0%; ▌Samuel Fowler (Democratic-Republican) 9.5%; ▌Jonathan Smith (Democratic-Republican) 5.8%; Scattering 6.7%
Massachusetts 6 "Hampshire North district"	Ebenezer Mattoon; Redistricted from the 3rd district	Federalist	1800 (special)	Incumbent retired. Federalist hold.	First ballot (November 1, 1802): ▌Hugh McClallan (Federalist) 29.5%; ▌John Williams (Federalist) 15.2%; ▌Samuel Taggart (Federalist) 14.9%; ▌Solomon Snead (Democratic-Republican) 12.3%; ▌Joseph Lyman (Federalist) 10.1%; ▌Solomon Nose (Federalist) 8.0%; ▌Edward Upham (Democratic-Republican) 5.2%; ▌Zebina Montague (Unknown) 4.8%; Second ballot (January 24, 1803): ▌Hugh McClallan (Federalist) 36.9%; ▌Samuel Taggart (Federalist) 27.5%; ▌Solomon Snead (Democratic-Republican) 21.2%; ▌John Williams (Federalist) 14.4%; Third ballot (April 3, 1803): ▌ ✓ Samuel Taggart (Federalist) 73.2%; ▌Hugh McClallan (Federalist) 26.8%
Massachusetts 7 "Plymouth district"	Josiah Smith; Redistricted from the 6th district	Democratic- Republican	1801	Incumbent retired. Federalist gain.	▌ ✓ Nahum Mitchell (Federalist) 58.3%; ▌Henry Warren (Democratic-Republican) 41.6%
Massachusetts 8 "Barnstable district"	Lemuel Williams; Redistricted from the 5th district	Federalist	1799	Incumbent re-elected.	▌ ✓ Lemuel Williams (Federalist) 55.5%; ▌Isaiah L. Green (Democratic-Republican) 44.5%
Massachusetts 9 "Bristol district"	Phanuel Bishop; Redistricted from the 7th district	Democratic- Republican	1799	Incumbent re-elected.	▌ ✓ Phanuel Bishop (Democratic-Republican) 57.3%; ▌Laban Wheaton (Federalist) 42.4%
Massachusetts 10 "Worcester South district"	Seth Hastings; Redistricted from the 4th district	Federalist	1801 (special)	Incumbent re-elected.	▌ ✓ Seth Hastings (Federalist) 62.2%; ▌Edward Bangs (Democratic-Republican) 37.3%
Massachusetts 11 "Worcester North district"	None (new district)			New seat. Federalist gain.	▌ ✓ William Stedman (Federalist) 71.7%; ▌John Whiting (Democratic-Republican) 27.9%
Massachusetts 12 "Berkshire district"	John Bacon; Redistricted from the 1st district	Democratic- Republican	1801	Incumbent retired. Democratic-Republican hold.	▌ ✓ Thomson J. Skinner (Democratic-Republican) 58.4%; ▌Daniel Dewey (Federalist) 41.0%
Massachusetts 13 "Norfolk district"	None (new district)			New seat. Democratic-Republican gain.	▌ ✓ Ebenezer Seaver (Democratic-Republican) 65.1%; ▌Oliver N. Everett (Federalist) 29.4%; ▌Samuel Dexter (Democratic-Republican) 2.8%; ▌Benjamin Hitchbourne (Democratic-Republican) 2.8%
Massachusetts 14 "York district" (District of Maine)	Richard Cutts	Democratic- Republican	1801 (special)	Incumbent re-elected.	▌ ✓ Richard Cutts (Democratic-Republican) 52.3%; ▌John Lord (Federalist) 44.4%; ▌Moses Sweat (Federalist) 3.2%
Massachusetts 15 "Cumberland district" (District of Maine)	Peleg Wadsworth; Redistricted from the 13th district	Federalist	1793	Incumbent re-elected.	▌ ✓ Peleg Wadsworth (Federalist) 88.5%; ▌Isaac Parsons (Democratic-Republican) 8.5%; Scattering 3.0%
Massachusetts 16 "Lincoln district" (District of Maine)	Samuel Thatcher; Redistricted from the 12th district	Federalist	1802 (special)	Incumbent re-elected.	▌ ✓ Samuel Thatcher (Federalist) 63.7%; ▌William King (Democratic-Republican) 18.1%; ▌John Farley (Democratic-Republican) 12.7%; Scattering 5.5%
Massachusetts 17 "Kennebec district" (District of Maine)	None (new district)			New seat. Federalist gain.	▌ ✓ Phineas Bruce (Federalist) 57.5%; ▌Martin Kinsley (Democratic-Republican) 42.5%

== Mississippi Territory ==
See Non-voting delegates, below.

== New Hampshire ==
New Hampshire increased its apportionment from 4 seats to 5 after the 1800 census.

District	Incumbent			This race	
District	Member	Party	First elected	Results	Candidates
New Hampshire at-large 5 seats on a general ticket	Samuel Tenney	Federalist	1800	Incumbent re-elected.	▌ ✓ Samuel Tenney (Federalist) 12.6%; ▌ ✓ Samuel Hunt (Federalist) 12.0%; ▌ ✓ David Hough (Federalist) 11.8%; ▌ ✓ Silas Betton (Federalist) 11.6%; ▌ ✓ Clifton Clagett (Federalist) 11.3%; ▌Nahum Parker (Democratic-Republican) 8.4%; ▌Clement Storer (Democratic-Republican) 8.0%; ▌Jonathan Smith (Democratic-Republican)8.0%; ▌Moody Bedell (Democratic-Republican) 7.1%; ▌Thomas Cogswell (Democratic-Republican) 4.5%; ▌Obed Hall (Democratic-Republican) 2.1%; Scattering 2.7%
New Hampshire at-large 5 seats on a general ticket	Vacant			Rep. Joseph Peirce (F) resigned in 1802. Federalist hold.	▌ ✓ Samuel Tenney (Federalist) 12.6%; ▌ ✓ Samuel Hunt (Federalist) 12.0%; ▌ ✓ David Hough (Federalist) 11.8%; ▌ ✓ Silas Betton (Federalist) 11.6%; ▌ ✓ Clifton Clagett (Federalist) 11.3%; ▌Nahum Parker (Democratic-Republican) 8.4%; ▌Clement Storer (Democratic-Republican) 8.0%; ▌Jonathan Smith (Democratic-Republican)8.0%; ▌Moody Bedell (Democratic-Republican) 7.1%; ▌Thomas Cogswell (Democratic-Republican) 4.5%; ▌Obed Hall (Democratic-Republican) 2.1%; Scattering 2.7%
New Hampshire at-large 5 seats on a general ticket	George B. Upham	Federalist	1800	Incumbent retired. Federalist hold.	▌ ✓ Samuel Tenney (Federalist) 12.6%; ▌ ✓ Samuel Hunt (Federalist) 12.0%; ▌ ✓ David Hough (Federalist) 11.8%; ▌ ✓ Silas Betton (Federalist) 11.6%; ▌ ✓ Clifton Clagett (Federalist) 11.3%; ▌Nahum Parker (Democratic-Republican) 8.4%; ▌Clement Storer (Democratic-Republican) 8.0%; ▌Jonathan Smith (Democratic-Republican)8.0%; ▌Moody Bedell (Democratic-Republican) 7.1%; ▌Thomas Cogswell (Democratic-Republican) 4.5%; ▌Obed Hall (Democratic-Republican) 2.1%; Scattering 2.7%
New Hampshire at-large 5 seats on a general ticket	Abiel Foster	Federalist	1794	Incumbent retired. Federalist hold.	▌ ✓ Samuel Tenney (Federalist) 12.6%; ▌ ✓ Samuel Hunt (Federalist) 12.0%; ▌ ✓ David Hough (Federalist) 11.8%; ▌ ✓ Silas Betton (Federalist) 11.6%; ▌ ✓ Clifton Clagett (Federalist) 11.3%; ▌Nahum Parker (Democratic-Republican) 8.4%; ▌Clement Storer (Democratic-Republican) 8.0%; ▌Jonathan Smith (Democratic-Republican)8.0%; ▌Moody Bedell (Democratic-Republican) 7.1%; ▌Thomas Cogswell (Democratic-Republican) 4.5%; ▌Obed Hall (Democratic-Republican) 2.1%; Scattering 2.7%
New Hampshire at-large 5 seats on a general ticket	None (new seat)			New seat. Federalist gain.	▌ ✓ Samuel Tenney (Federalist) 12.6%; ▌ ✓ Samuel Hunt (Federalist) 12.0%; ▌ ✓ David Hough (Federalist) 11.8%; ▌ ✓ Silas Betton (Federalist) 11.6%; ▌ ✓ Clifton Clagett (Federalist) 11.3%; ▌Nahum Parker (Democratic-Republican) 8.4%; ▌Clement Storer (Democratic-Republican) 8.0%; ▌Jonathan Smith (Democratic-Republican)8.0%; ▌Moody Bedell (Democratic-Republican) 7.1%; ▌Thomas Cogswell (Democratic-Republican) 4.5%; ▌Obed Hall (Democratic-Republican) 2.1%; Scattering 2.7%

== New Jersey ==
New Jersey increased its apportionment from 5 seats to 6 after the 1800 census.

The Federalists did not run any official candidates in 1802, but a few Federalists did receive scattered votes.

District	Incumbent			This race	
District	Member	Party	First elected	Results	Candidates
New Jersey at-large 6 seats on a general ticket	John Condit	Democratic-Republican	1798	Incumbent retired to run for Senate. Democratic-Republican hold.	▌ ✓ James Mott (Democratic-Republican) 16.5%; ▌ ✓ Henry Southard (Democratic-Republican) 16.4%; ▌ ✓ William Helms (Democratic-Republican) 16.4%; ▌ ✓ Ebenezer Elmer (Democratic-Republican) 16.3%; ▌ ✓ Adam Boyd (Democratic-Republican) 16.3%; ▌ ✓ James Sloan (Democratic-Republican) 16.3%; Others: ▌Aaron Ogden (Federalist) 0.5%; ▌Frederick Frelinghuysen (Federalist) 0.4%; ▌William Coxe (Federalist) 0.3%; ▌James H. Imlay (Federalist) 0.3%; ▌Richard Stockton (Federalist) 0.3%; ▌Jonathan Elmer (Federalist) 0.2%
New Jersey at-large 6 seats on a general ticket	Ebenezer Elmer	Democratic-Republican	1800	Incumbent re-elected.	
New Jersey at-large 6 seats on a general ticket	William Helms	Democratic-Republican	1800	Incumbent re-elected.	
New Jersey at-large 6 seats on a general ticket	James Mott	Democratic-Republican	1800	Incumbent re-elected.	
New Jersey at-large 6 seats on a general ticket	Henry Southard	Democratic-Republican	1800	Incumbent re-elected.	
New Jersey at-large 6 seats on a general ticket	None (new seat)			New seat. Democratic-Republican gain.	

== New York ==
New York's apportionment increased from 10 seats to 17 seats after the 1800 census. The state was subsequently redistricted. 11 open seats were available due to the increase in apportionment and retirement of incumbents.

District	Incumbent			This race	
District	Member	Party	First elected	Results	Candidates
New York 1	John Smith	Democratic-Republican	1799 (special)	Incumbent re-elected.	▌ ✓ John Smith (Democratic-Republican) 100%
New York 2	None (new district)			New seat. Federalist gain.	▌ ✓ Joshua Sands (Federalist) 51.3%; ▌John Broome (Democratic-Republican) 48.7%
New York 3	Samuel L. Mitchill; Redistricted from the 2nd district	Democratic-Republican	1800	Incumbent re-elected.	▌ ✓ Samuel L. Mitchill (Democratic-Republican) 96.5%; ▌Joshua Sands (Federalist) 3.5%
New York 4	Philip Van Cortlandt; Redistricted from the 3rd district	Democratic-Republican	1793	Incumbent re-elected.	▌ ✓ Philip Van Cortlandt (Democratic-Republican) 83.5%; ▌Peter Taulman (Democratic-Republican) 16.5%
New York 5	None (new district)			New seat. Democratic-Republican gain.	▌ ✓ Andrew McCord (Democratic-Republican) 84.4%; ▌John Hathorn (Federalist) 15.6%
New York 6	Theodorus Bailey; Redistricted from the 5th district	Democratic-Republican	1793; 1796 (lost); 1798; 1800 (retired); 1801 (special)	Incumbent retired to run for U.S. senator. Democratic-Republican gain.	▌ ✓ Isaac Bloom (Democratic-Republican) 55.4%; ▌Samuel Mott (Federalist) 44.6%
New York 7	Lucas Elmendorf; Redistricted from the 4th district	Democratic-Republican	1796	Incumbent retired. Democratic-Republican gain.	▌ ✓ John Cantine (Democratic-Republican) 48.8%; ▌Conrad C. Elmendorf (Federalist) 46.3%; ▌Conrad E. Elmendorf (Federalist) 4.9%
New York 8	John P. Van Ness; Redistricted from the 6th district	Democratic-Republican	1801 (special)	Incumbent lost re-election. Federalist gain.	▌ ✓ Henry W. Livingston (Federalist) 51.5%; ▌John P. Van Ness (Democratic-Republican) 48.5%
New York 9	Killian Van Rensselaer; Redistricted from the 8th district	Federalist	1800	Incumbent re-elected.	▌ ✓ Killian Van Rensselaer (Federalist) 62.4%; ▌Abraham G. Lansing (Democratic-Republican) 37.6%
New York 10	None (new district)			New seat. Federalist gain.	▌ ✓ George Tibbits (Federalist) 51.2%; ▌Josiah Masters (Democratic-Republican) 48.8%
New York 11	None (new district)			New seat. Democratic-Republican gain.	▌ ✓ Beriah Palmer (Democratic-Republican) 74.2%; ▌Guert Van Schoonhoven (Federalist) 25.8%
New York 12	David Thomas; Redistricted from the 7th district	Democratic-Republican	1800	Incumbent re-elected.	▌ ✓ David Thomas (Democratic-Republican) 64.1%; ▌John Williams (Federalist) 35.9%
New York 13	None (new district)			New seat. Democratic-Republican gain.	▌ ✓ Thomas Sammons (Democratic-Republican) 68.3%; ▌Robert McFarlan (Federalist) 31.7%
New York 14	None (new district)			New seat. Democratic-Republican gain.	▌ ✓ Erastus Root (Democratic-Republican) 57.4%; ▌Benjamin Gilbert (Federalist) 42.8%
New York 15	None (new district)			New seat. Federalist gain.	▌ ✓ Gaylord Griswold (Federalist) 53.5%; ▌Francis A. Bloodgood (Democratic-Republican) 46.5%
New York 16	Benjamin Walker; Redistricted from the 9th district	Federalist	1800	Incumbent retired. Democratic-Republican gain.	▌ ✓ John Paterson (Democratic-Republican) 55.4%; ▌Comfort Tyler (Federalist) 44.6%
New York 17	Thomas Morris; Redistricted from the 10th district	Federalist	1800	Incumbent retired. Democratic-Republican gain.	▌ ✓ Oliver Phelps (Democratic-Republican) 41.5%; ▌Nathaniel W. Howell (Federalist) 37.1%; ▌William Stuart (Democratic-Republican) 21.4%

== North Carolina ==
North Carolina increased its apportionment from 10 to 12 seats after the 1800 census.

District	Incumbent			This race	
District	Member	Party	First elected	Results	Candidates
North Carolina 1	Thomas Wynns; Redistricted from the 8th district	Democratic- Republican	1802 (special)	Incumbent re-elected.	▌ ✓ Thomas Wynns (Democratic-Republican) 100.0%
North Carolina 2	Willis Alston; Redistricted from the 9th district	Democratic- Republican	1798	Incumbent re-elected.	▌ ✓ Willis Alston (Democratic-Republican) 63.1%; ▌William R. Davie (Federalist) 36.9%
North Carolina 3	None (new district)			New seat. Democratic-Republican gain.	▌ ✓ William Kennedy (Democratic-Republican) 51.1%; ▌Thomas Blount (Democratic-Republican) 48.9%
North Carolina 4	John Stanly; Redistricted from the 10th district	Federalist	1800	Incumbent lost re-election. Democratic-Republican gain.	▌ ✓ William Blackledge (Democratic-Republican) 59.9%; ▌John Stanly (Federalist) 40.1%
North Carolina 5	William H. Hill; Redistricted from the 6th district	Federalist	1798	Incumbent retired when appointed U.S. District Judge (later withdrawn). Democratic-Republican gain.	▌ ✓ James Gillespie (Democratic-Republican) 57.5%; ▌Alexander D. Moore (Federalist) 42.5%
North Carolina 6	Nathaniel Macon; Redistricted from the 5th district	Democratic- Republican	1791	Incumbent re-elected.	▌ ✓ Nathaniel Macon (Democratic-Republican) 99.8%
North Carolina 7	William B. Grove	Federalist	1790	Incumbent retired. Federalist hold.	▌ ✓ Samuel D. Purviance (Federalist) 42.3%; ▌Duncan McFarlan (Democratic-Republican) 33.0%; ▌Isaac Lanier (Federalist) 23.6%; ▌John Hay (Democratic-Republican) 1.1%
North Carolina 7	Robert Williams; Redistricted from the 3rd district	Democratic- Republican	1796	Incumbent retired to run for Governor of North Carolina. Democratic-Republican loss.	▌ ✓ Samuel D. Purviance (Federalist) 42.3%; ▌Duncan McFarlan (Democratic-Republican) 33.0%; ▌Isaac Lanier (Federalist) 23.6%; ▌John Hay (Democratic-Republican) 1.1%
North Carolina 8	Richard Stanford; Redistricted from the 4th district	Democratic- Republican	1796	Incumbent re-elected.	▌ ✓ Richard Stanford (Democratic-Republican) 75.1%; ▌Nathaniel Jones (Federalist) 24.9%
North Carolina 9	None (new district)			New seat. Democratic-Republican gain.	▌ ✓ Marmaduke Williams (Democratic-Republican) 53.8%; ▌Theophilus Lacy (Democratic-Republican) 28.3%; ▌William Nash (Democratic-Republican) 15.5%; ▌Anton Brown (Federalist) 2.4%
North Carolina 10	None (new district)			New seat. Democratic-Republican gain.	▌ ✓ Nathaniel Alexander (Democratic-Republican) 55.8%; ▌Basil Gaither (Federalist) 44.2%
North Carolina 11	James Holland; Redistricted from the 1st district	Democratic- Republican	1800	Incumbent re-elected.	▌ ✓ James Holland (Democratic-Republican) 70.7%; ▌William Tate (Federalist) 29.3%
North Carolina 12	Archibald Henderson; Redistricted from the 2nd district	Federalist	1798	Incumbent retired. Democratic-Republican gain.	▌ ✓ Joseph Winston (Democratic-Republican) 29.6%; ▌Meshack Franklin (Democratic-Republican) 28.6%; ▌William Lenoir (Democratic-Republican) 22.8%; ▌George Houser (Democratic-Republican) 9.7%; ▌Mussendine Matthews (Federalist) 9.3%

== Ohio ==
District	Incumbent			This race	
District	Member	Party	First elected	Results	Candidates
Ohio at-large	Ohio is considered to have been admitted to the Union near the end of the 7th Congress, (Note: The official date when Ohio became a state was not set until 1953, when the 83rd Congress passed legislation retroactively designating the date of the first meeting of the Ohio state legislature, March 1, 1803, as that date. However, on April 30, 1802, the 7th Congress had passed an act "authorizing the inhabitants of Ohio to form a Constitution and state government, and admission of Ohio into the Union." On February 19, 1803, the same Congress passed an act "providing for the execution of the laws of the United States in the State of Ohio." The Biographical Directory of the United States Congress states that Ohio was admitted to the Union on November 29, 1802, and counts its seats as vacant from that date.) but did not elect representatives until the 8th Congress. For this reason, Ohio is considered to have had a vacant seat in the House and two vacant seats in the Senate in the 7th Congress.			New seat. Democratic-Republican gain	▌ ✓ Jeremiah Morrow (Democratic-Republican) 49.4%; ▌William McMillan (Note: Former delegate for the Northwest Territory) (Federalist) 25.2%; ▌Michael Baldwin (Democratic-Republican) 12.0%; ▌Elias Langham (Democratic-Republican) 8.2%; ▌William Goforth (Democratic-Republican) 4.2%; ▌Bazaleel Wells (Federalist) 1.0%

== Pennsylvania ==
Pennsylvania increased its apportionment from 13 to 18 seats after the 1800 census. The state was re-districted from 12 into 11 districts, four of which were plural districts.

District	Incumbent			This race	
District	Member	Party	First elected	Results	Candidates
Pennsylvania 1 Plural district with 3 seats	William Jones	Democratic- Republican	1800	Incumbent retired. Democratic-Republican hold.	▌ ✓ Joseph Clay (Democratic-Republican) 20.2%; ▌ ✓ Jacob Richards (Democratic-Republican) 20.0%; ▌ ✓ Michael Leib (Democratic-Republican) 18.4%; ▌George Latimer (Federalist) 13.4%; ▌Peter Brown (Federalist) 13.3%; ▌Jonas Preston (Federalist) 13.2%; ▌Elisha Gordon (Federalist) 1.4%
Pennsylvania 1 Plural district with 3 seats	None (new seat)			New seat. Democratic-Republican gain.	▌ ✓ Joseph Clay (Democratic-Republican) 20.2%; ▌ ✓ Jacob Richards (Democratic-Republican) 20.0%; ▌ ✓ Michael Leib (Democratic-Republican) 18.4%; ▌George Latimer (Federalist) 13.4%; ▌Peter Brown (Federalist) 13.3%; ▌Jonas Preston (Federalist) 13.2%; ▌Elisha Gordon (Federalist) 1.4%
Pennsylvania 1 Plural district with 3 seats	Michael Leib; Redistricted from the 2nd district	Democratic- Republican	1798	Incumbent re-elected.	▌ ✓ Joseph Clay (Democratic-Republican) 20.2%; ▌ ✓ Jacob Richards (Democratic-Republican) 20.0%; ▌ ✓ Michael Leib (Democratic-Republican) 18.4%; ▌George Latimer (Federalist) 13.4%; ▌Peter Brown (Federalist) 13.3%; ▌Jonas Preston (Federalist) 13.2%; ▌Elisha Gordon (Federalist) 1.4%
Pennsylvania 2 Plural district with 3 seats	Robert Brown; Redistricted from the 4th district	Democratic- Republican	1798 (special)	Incumbent re-elected.	▌ ✓ Robert Brown (Democratic-Republican) 33.0%; ▌ ✓ Isaac Van Horne (Democratic-Republican) 30.8%; ▌ ✓ Frederick Conrad (Democratic-Republican) 17.9%; ▌Samuel Sitgreaves (Federalist) 11.3%; ▌Nathaniel Borleau (Federalist) 4.8%; ▌Lord Butler (Federalist) 2.2%
Pennsylvania 2 Plural district with 3 seats	None (new seat)			New seat. Democratic-Republican gain.	▌ ✓ Robert Brown (Democratic-Republican) 33.0%; ▌ ✓ Isaac Van Horne (Democratic-Republican) 30.8%; ▌ ✓ Frederick Conrad (Democratic-Republican) 17.9%; ▌Samuel Sitgreaves (Federalist) 11.3%; ▌Nathaniel Borleau (Federalist) 4.8%; ▌Lord Butler (Federalist) 2.2%
Pennsylvania 2 Plural district with 3 seats	Isaac Van Horne; Redistricted from the 4th district	Democratic- Republican	1801 (special)	Incumbent re-elected.	▌ ✓ Robert Brown (Democratic-Republican) 33.0%; ▌ ✓ Isaac Van Horne (Democratic-Republican) 30.8%; ▌ ✓ Frederick Conrad (Democratic-Republican) 17.9%; ▌Samuel Sitgreaves (Federalist) 11.3%; ▌Nathaniel Borleau (Federalist) 4.8%; ▌Lord Butler (Federalist) 2.2%
Pennsylvania 3 Plural district with 3 seats	Joseph Hemphill	Federalist	1800	Incumbent lost re-election. Democratic-Republican gain.	▌ ✓ John Whitehill (Democratic-Republican) 22.1%; ▌ ✓ Isaac Anderson (Democratic-Republican) 22.0%; ▌ ✓ Joseph Hiester (Democratic-Republican)21.7%; ▌Jacob Bower (Federalist) 11.6%; ▌Joseph Hemphill (Federalist) 11.4%; ▌Thomas Boude (Federalist) 11.3%
Pennsylvania 3 Plural district with 3 seats	Joseph Hiester; Redistricted from the 5th district	Democratic- Republican	1797 (special)	Incumbent re-elected.	▌ ✓ John Whitehill (Democratic-Republican) 22.1%; ▌ ✓ Isaac Anderson (Democratic-Republican) 22.0%; ▌ ✓ Joseph Hiester (Democratic-Republican)21.7%; ▌Jacob Bower (Federalist) 11.6%; ▌Joseph Hemphill (Federalist) 11.4%; ▌Thomas Boude (Federalist) 11.3%
Pennsylvania 3 Plural district with 3 seats	Thomas Boude; Redistricted from the 7th district	Federalist	1800	Incumbent lost re-election. Democratic-Republican gain.	▌ ✓ John Whitehill (Democratic-Republican) 22.1%; ▌ ✓ Isaac Anderson (Democratic-Republican) 22.0%; ▌ ✓ Joseph Hiester (Democratic-Republican)21.7%; ▌Jacob Bower (Federalist) 11.6%; ▌Joseph Hemphill (Federalist) 11.4%; ▌Thomas Boude (Federalist) 11.3%
Pennsylvania 4 Plural district with 2 seats	John A. Hanna; Redistricted from the 6th district	Democratic- Republican	1796	Incumbent re-elected.	▌ ✓ John A. Hanna (Democratic-Republican) 50.5%; ▌ ✓ David Bard (Democratic-Republican) 49.3%; ▌David Mitchell (Federalist) 0.2%
Pennsylvania 4 Plural district with 2 seats	None (new seat)			New seat. Democratic-Republican gain.	▌ ✓ John A. Hanna (Democratic-Republican) 50.5%; ▌ ✓ David Bard (Democratic-Republican) 49.3%; ▌David Mitchell (Federalist) 0.2%
Pennsylvania 5	Andrew Gregg; Redistricted from the 9th district	Democratic- Republican	1791	Incumbent re-elected.	▌ ✓ Andrew Gregg (Democratic-Republican); Unopposed
Pennsylvania 6	John Stewart; Redistricted from the 8th district	Democratic- Republican	1800	Incumbent re-elected.	▌ ✓ John Stewart (Democratic-Republican) 56.7%; ▌John Edie (Federalist) 43.3%
Pennsylvania 7	Henry Woods; Redistricted from the 10th district	Federalist	1798	Incumbent lost re-election. Democratic-Republican gain.	▌ ✓ John Rea (Democratic-Republican) 66.6%; ▌Henry Woods (Federalist) 28.9%; ▌John McLene (Democratic-Republican) 4.5%
Pennsylvania 8	None (new district)			New seat. Democratic-Republican gain.	▌ ✓ William Findley (Democratic-Republican) 53.9%; ▌Jacob Painter (Democratic-Republican) 46.1%
Pennsylvania 9	John Smilie; Redistricted from the 11th district	Democratic- Republican	1792; 1798	Incumbent re-elected.	▌ ✓ John Smilie (Democratic-Republican); Unopposed
Pennsylvania 10	William Hoge; Redistricted from the 12th district	Democratic- Republican	1801 (special)	Incumbent re-elected.	▌ ✓ William Hoge (Democratic-Republican); Unopposed
Pennsylvania 11	None (new district)			New seat. Democratic-Republican gain.	▌ ✓ John Lucas (Democratic-Republican) 48.9%; ▌John Wilkins (Federalist) 36.7%; ▌Alexander Foster (Federalist) 14.4%

== Rhode Island ==
District	Incumbent			This race	
District	Member	Party	First elected	Results	Candidates
Rhode Island at-large 2 seats on a general ticket	Thomas Tillinghast	Democratic-Republican	1800	Incumbent lost re-election. Democratic-Republican hold.	▌ ✓ Joseph Stanton Jr. (Democratic-Republican) 30.7%; ▌ ✓ Nehemiah Knight (Democratic-Republican) 30.6%; ▌Thomas Tillinghast (Federalist) (Note: Changed parties) 19.4%; ▌Elisha Reynolds Potter (Federalist) 19.3%
Rhode Island at-large 2 seats on a general ticket	Joseph Stanton Jr.	Democratic-Republican	1800	Incumbent re-elected.	▌ ✓ Joseph Stanton Jr. (Democratic-Republican) 30.7%; ▌ ✓ Nehemiah Knight (Democratic-Republican) 30.6%; ▌Thomas Tillinghast (Federalist) 19.4%; ▌Elisha Reynolds Potter (Federalist) 19.3%

== South Carolina ==
South Carolina increased its apportionment from 6 seats to 8 after the 1800 census.

District	Incumbent			This race	
District	Member	Party	First elected	Results	Candidates
South Carolina 1 "Charleston district"	Thomas Lowndes	Federalist	1800	Incumbent re-elected.	▌ ✓ Thomas Lowndes (Federalist) 52.3%; ▌Robert Marion (Democratic-Republican) 47.7%
South Carolina 2 "Beaufort and Edgefield district"	John Rutledge Jr.	Federalist	1796	Incumbent lost re-election. Democratic-Republican gain.	▌ ✓ William Butler Sr. (Democratic-Republican) 93.3%; ▌John Rutledge Jr. (Federalist) 6.7%
South Carolina 2 "Beaufort and Edgefield district"	William Butler Sr. Redistricted from the 5th district	Democratic- Republican	1800	Incumbent re-elected.	▌ ✓ William Butler Sr. (Democratic-Republican) 93.3%; ▌John Rutledge Jr. (Federalist) 6.7%
South Carolina 3 "Georgetown district"	Benjamin Huger	Federalist	1798	Incumbent re-elected.	▌ ✓ Benjamin Huger (Federalist) 50.9%; ▌Lemuel Benton (Democratic-Republican) 49.1%
South Carolina 4 "Orangeburgh district"	None (new district)			New seat. Democratic-Republican gain.	▌ ✓ Wade Hampton (Democratic-Republican) 50.9%; ▌John Taylor (Federalist) 49.1%
South Carolina 5 "Sumter district"	Richard Winn; Redistricted from the 4th district	Democratic- Republican	1802 (special)	Incumbent re-elected.	▌ ✓ Richard Winn (Democratic-Republican) 52.1%; ▌John Kershaw (Federalist) 47.9%
South Carolina 6 "Abbeville district"	None (new district)			New seat. Democratic-Republican gain.	▌ ✓ Levi Casey (Democratic-Republican) 43.5%; ▌John Calhoun (Democratic-Republican) 29.8%; ▌Robert Creswell (Federalist) 14.1%; ▌James Saxon (Federalist) 10.3%; ▌Benjamin Herndon (Federalist) 2.4%
South Carolina 7 "Chester district"	Thomas Moore; Redistricted from the 6th district	Democratic- Republican	1800	Incumbent re-elected.	▌ ✓ Thomas Moore (Democratic-Republican) 60.5%; ▌William Hill (Federalist) 25.8%; ▌William Smith (Democratic-Republican) 13.8%
South Carolina 8 "Pendleton district"	None (new district)			New seat. Democratic-Republican gain.	▌ ✓ John B. Earle (Democratic-Republican) 71.8%; ▌Eliab Moore (Federalist) 28.2%

== Tennessee ==
Tennessee increased its apportionment from 1 seat to 3 seats after the 1800 census.

District	Incumbent			This race	
District	Member	Party	First elected	Results	Candidates
Tennessee at-large 3 seats on a general ticket	William Dickson	Democratic-Republican	1801	Incumbent re-elected.	▌ ✓ William Dickson (Democratic-Republican) 30.2%; ▌ ✓ George W. Campbell (Democratic-Republican) 29.7%; ▌ ✓ John Rhea (Democratic-Republican) 23.0%; ▌John Cocke (Democratic-Republican) 17.2%
Tennessee at-large 3 seats on a general ticket	None (new seat)			New seat. Democratic-Republican gain.	▌ ✓ William Dickson (Democratic-Republican) 30.2%; ▌ ✓ George W. Campbell (Democratic-Republican) 29.7%; ▌ ✓ John Rhea (Democratic-Republican) 23.0%; ▌John Cocke (Democratic-Republican) 17.2%
Tennessee at-large 3 seats on a general ticket	None (new seat)			New seat. Democratic-Republican gain.	▌ ✓ William Dickson (Democratic-Republican) 30.2%; ▌ ✓ George W. Campbell (Democratic-Republican) 29.7%; ▌ ✓ John Rhea (Democratic-Republican) 23.0%; ▌John Cocke (Democratic-Republican) 17.2%

== Vermont ==
Vermont increased its apportionment from 2 seats to 4 after the 1800 census. Vermont law at the time required a majority of votes to win an office, which frequently necessitated additional ballots.

District	Incumbent			This race	
District	Member	Party	First elected	Results	Candidates
Vermont 1 "Southwest district"	Israel Smith	Democratic- Republican	1791; 1797 (lost); 1800	Incumbent retired to run for U.S. senator. Democratic-Republican hold.	▌ ✓ Gideon Olin (Democratic-Republican) 54.3%; ▌Jonas Galusha (Democratic-Republican) 18.1%; ▌Abel Spencer (Federalist) 14.0%; ▌Chauncey Langdon (Federalist) 10.2%; ▌Daniel Fay 1.9%; Others 1.5%
Vermont 2 "Southeast district"	Lewis R. Morris	Federalist	1797 (special)	Incumbent lost re-election. Federalist hold.	First ballot (December 13, 1802): ▌Lewis R. Morris (Federalist) 45.6%; ▌James Elliot (Federalist) 42.7%; ▌Paul Brigham (Democratic-Republican) 5.4%; ▌Amasa Paine (Federalist) 2.9%; Others 3.4%; Second ballot (March 1, 1803): ▌ ✓ James Elliot (Federalist) 54.1%; ▌Daniel Farrand (Federalist) 37.6%; ▌Aaron Leland (Democratic-Republican) 4.4%; ▌Lewis R. Morris (Federalist) 1.5%; Others 2.3%
Vermont 3 "Northeast district"	None (new district)			New seat. Federalist gain.	▌ ✓ William Chamberlain (Federalist) 53.9%; ▌Nathaniel Niles (Democratic-Republican) 38.2%; ▌James Fisk (Democratic-Republican) 7.3%; Others 0.5%
Vermont 4 "Northwest district"	None (new district)			New seat. Federalist gain.	First ballot (December 13, 1802): ▌Udney Hay (Democratic-Republican) 45.3%; ▌Martin Chittenden (Federalist) 28.2%; ▌Amos Marsh (Federalist) 19.6%; ▌Daniel Chipman (Federalist) 2.3%; ▌William C. Harrington (Federalist) 1.9%; Others 2.7%; Second ballot (March 1, 1803): ▌Udney Hay (Democratic-Republican) 49.2%; ▌Martin Chittenden (Federalist) 29.8%; ▌Amos Marsh (Federalist) 19.9%; Others 1.1%; Third ballot (May 9, 1803): ▌ ✓ Martin Chittenden (Federalist) 54.0%; ▌Udney Hay (Democratic-Republican) 44.8%; Others 1.2%

== Virginia ==
Virginia increased its apportionment from 19 to 22 seats after the 1800 census. Virginia's congressional delegation remained the largest of any state, but would lose this distinction permanently after the census of 1810. Elections were held over three days in April 1803.

District	Incumbent			This race	
District	Member	Party	First elected	Results	Candidates
Virginia 1	George Jackson; Redistricted from the 3rd district	Democratic- Republican	1795; 1797 (lost); 1799	Incumbent retired. Democratic-Republican hold.	▌ ✓ John G. Jackson (Democratic-Republican) (Note: Numbers of votes missing or incomplete in source); ▌Thomas Wilson (Federalist)
Virginia 2	None (new district)			New seat. Federalist gain.	▌ ✓ James Stephenson (Federalist) 53.6%; ▌Osborn Sprigg (Democratic-Republican) 46.4%
Virginia 3	John Smith; Redistricted from the 1st district	Democratic- Republican	1801	Incumbent re-elected.	▌ ✓ John Smith (Democratic-Republican) 89.9%; ▌Joseph Sexton (Democratic-Republican) 10.1%
Virginia 4	David Holmes; Redistricted from the 2nd district	Democratic- Republican	1797	Incumbent re-elected.	▌ ✓ David Holmes (Democratic-Republican); ▌Isaac Van Meter (Federalist)
Virginia 5	None (new district)			New seat. Federalist gain. Results were subsequently challenged and overturned. (Note: Thomas Lewis Jr. (Federalist) was initially declared the winner with 1,004 votes for Lewis, 832 for Andrew Moore (Democratic-Republican), and 423 for John Woodward (Federalist). However, upon investigation by the House Committee on Elections, it was determined that 355 votes for Lewis and 124 votes for Moore were cast by individuals who did not meet Virginia's voter qualifications, making the adjusted totals 708 legal votes for Moore and 649 legal votes for Lewis, thus, the Committee awarded this seat to Moore on March 5, 1804.)	▌ ✓ Thomas Lewis Jr. (Federalist) 44.4%; ▌Andrew Moore (Democratic-Republican) 36.8%; ▌John Woodward (Federalist) 18.7%
Virginia 6	Abram Trigg; Redistricted from the 4th district	Democratic- Republican	1797	Incumbent re-elected.	▌ ✓ Abram Trigg (Democratic-Republican) 100%
Virginia 7	Richard Brent; Redistricted from the 17th district	Democratic- Republican	1801	Incumbent lost re-election. Federalist gain.	▌ ✓ Joseph Lewis Jr. (Federalist) 56.5%; ▌Richard Brent (Democratic-Republican) 43.5%
Virginia 8	None (new district)			New seat. Democratic-Republican gain.	▌ ✓ Walter Jones (Democratic-Republican) (Note: Only the two top candidates listed here, partial returns suggest Jones won by a very large majority.); ▌James Ball (Federalist)
Virginia 9	Philip R. Thompson; Redistricted from the 18th district	Democratic- Republican	1793	Incumbent re-elected.	▌ ✓ Philip R. Thompson (Democratic-Republican) 100%
Virginia 10	John Dawson; Redistricted from the 15th district	Democratic- Republican	1797	Incumbent re-elected.	▌ ✓ John Dawson (Democratic-Republican); ▌William I. Callis (Federalist)
Virginia 11	Anthony New; Redistricted from the 16th district	Democratic- Republican	1793	Incumbent re-elected.	▌ ✓ Anthony New (Democratic-Republican) 71.4%; ▌John Taylor (Federalist) 28.6%
Virginia 12	None (new district)			New seat. Federalist gain.	▌ ✓ Thomas Griffin (Federalist) 50.8%; ▌Burwell Bassett (Democratic-Republican) 49.2%
Virginia 13	John J. Trigg; Redistricted from the 5th district	Democratic- Republican	1797	Incumbent re-elected.	▌ ✓ John J. Trigg (Democratic-Republican) 100%
Virginia 14	Matthew Clay; Redistricted from the 6th district	Democratic- Republican	1797	Incumbent re-elected.	▌ ✓ Matthew Clay (Democratic-Republican) 88.9%; ▌James Hurt (Federalist) 11.1%
Virginia 15	John Randolph; Redistricted from the 7th district	Democratic- Republican	1799	Incumbent re-elected.	▌ ✓ John Randolph (Democratic-Republican); ▌Paul Carrington (Federalist); ▌Abraham B. Venable (Democratic-Republican); ▌Ischaxner Woodson (Unknown)
Virginia 16	William B. Giles; Redistricted from the 9th district	Democratic- Republican	1790 (special); 1798 (resigned); 1801	Incumbent retired. Democratic-Republican hold.	▌ ✓ John W. Eppes (Democratic-Republican)
Virginia 17	Thomas Claiborne; Redistricted from the 8th district	Democratic- Republican	1793; 1801	Incumbent re-elected.	▌ ✓ Thomas Claiborne (Democratic-Republican) 51.3%; ▌Richard Field (Federalist) 48.7%
Virginia 18	None (new district)			New seat. Democratic-Republican gain.	▌ ✓ Peterson Goodwyn (Democratic-Republican) 66.9%; ▌James Jones (Federalist) 33.1%
Virginia 19	Edwin Gray; Redistricted from the 10th district	Democratic- Republican	1799	Incumbent re-elected.	▌ ✓ Edwin Gray (Democratic-Republican) 100%
Virginia 19	John Taliaferro	Democratic- Republican	1801	Incumbent retired. Democratic-Republican loss.	▌ ✓ Edwin Gray (Democratic-Republican) 100%
Virginia 20	Thomas Newton Jr. Redistricted from the 11th district	Democratic- Republican	1799	Incumbent re-elected.	▌ ✓ Thomas Newton Jr. (Democratic-Republican) 100%
Virginia 21	Samuel J. Cabell; Redistricted from the 14th district	Democratic- Republican	1795	Incumbent lost re-election. Democratic-Republican hold.	▌ ✓ Thomas M. Randolph (Democratic-Republican) 50.4%; ▌Samuel J. Cabell (Democratic-Republican) 49.6%
Virginia 22	John Clopton; Redistricted from the 13th district	Democratic- Republican	1801	Incumbent re-elected.	▌ ✓ John Clopton (Democratic-Republican); ▌James Rind (Federalist)

== Non-voting delegates ==
District	Incumbent			This race	
District	Delegate	Party	First elected	Results	Candidates
Mississippi Territory at-large	Thomas M. Green Jr.	Democratic-Republican	1802 (Special)	Incumbent retired. New delegate elected on an unknown date. Democratic-Republican hold.	▌ ✓ William Lattimore (Democratic-Republican); [data missing]

== See also ==
- 1802 United States elections
  - List of United States House of Representatives elections (1789–1822)
  - 1802–03 United States Senate elections
- 7th United States Congress
- 8th United States Congress

== Bibliography ==
- "A New Nation Votes: American Election Returns 1787-1825". Tufts Digital Library, Tufts University. Archived from the original on January 29, 2015.
- Dubin, Michael J. (March 1, 1998). United States Congressional Elections, 1788-1997: The Official Results of the Elections of the 1st Through 105th Congresses. McFarland and Company. ISBN 978-0786402830.
- Martis, Kenneth C. (January 1, 1989). The Historical Atlas of Political Parties in the United States Congress, 1789-1989. Macmillan Publishing Company. ISBN 978-0029201701.
- "Party Divisions of the House of Representatives* 1789–Present". Office of the Historian, United States House of Representatives.
- Mapping Early American Elections project team (2019). "Mapping Early American Elections". Roy Rosenzweig Center for History and New Media, George Mason University.
