= List of elections in 1802 =

The following elections occurred in the year 1802.

== North America ==
=== United States ===
- 1802 United States elections

==== United States lieutenant gubernatorial ====
- 1802 Connecticut lieutenant gubernatorial election

==== United States gubernatorial ====
- 1802 Connecticut gubernatorial election
- 1802 Georgia gubernatorial special election
- 1802 Maryland gubernatorial election
- 1802 Massachusetts gubernatorial election
- 1802 New Hampshire gubernatorial election
- 1802 New Jersey gubernatorial election
- 1802 North Carolina gubernatorial election
- 1802 North Carolina gubernatorial special election
- 1802 Pennsylvania gubernatorial election
- 1802 Rhode Island gubernatorial election
- 1802 South Carolina gubernatorial election
- 1802 Vermont gubernatorial election
- 1802 Virginia gubernatorial election

==== United States Senate ====
- 1802 and 1803 United States Senate elections
- United States Senate special election in Delaware, 1802
- United States Senate special election in New York, 1802
- United States Senate special election in Pennsylvania, 1802

==== United States House of Representatives ====
- 1802–03 United States House of Representatives elections
- 1802 United States House of Representatives election in Delaware
- 1802 United States House of Representatives election in Georgia
- April 1802 Georgia's at-large congressional district special election
- December 1802 Georgia's at-large congressional district special election
- 1801–02 Massachusetts's 12th congressional district special election
- 1802 Maryland's 2nd congressional district special election
- 1802 United States House of Representatives elections in Maryland
- 1802 Maryland's 2nd congressional district special election
- 1802 United States House of Representatives elections in Massachusetts
- 1802 Massachusetts's 12th congressional district special election
- 1802 United States House of Representatives election in New Hampshire
- 1802 New Hampshire's at-large congressional district special election
- 1802 United States House of Representatives election in New Jersey
- 1802 United States House of Representatives elections in New York
- 1802 New York's 4th congressional district special election
- 1802 North Carolina's 8th congressional district special election
- 1802 United States House of Representatives elections in Pennsylvania
- 1802 Pennsylvania's 4th congressional district special election
- 1802 United States House of Representatives elections in South Carolina
- 1802 South Carolina's 4th congressional district special election
- 1802 United States House of Representatives election in Vermont

== Europe ==
=== United Kingdom ===
- 1802 United Kingdom general election

== See also ==
- Category:1802 elections
