= 1801 North Carolina's 8th congressional district special election =

A special election was held in North Carolina's 8th congressional district on August 6, 1801, to fill a vacancy created when David Stone (F) resigned upon being elected to the Senate before the 7th Congress began.

== Election results ==
Candidate	Party	Votes	Percent
Charles Johnson	Democratic-Republican	2,160	53.2%
Thomas Wynns	Democratic-Republican	1,903	46.8%
Thomas Johnston	Democratic-Republican	1	0.03%

Johnson took his seat on December 7, 1801, at the start of the 7th Congress. He subsequently died on July 23, 1802, creating a second vacancy which was filled in another special election.

== See also ==
- List of special elections to the United States House of Representatives
