= 1801–02 Massachusetts's 12th congressional district special election =

A special election was held in Massachusetts's 12th congressional district on five occasions between September 25, 1801, and July 29, 1802, to fill a vacancy left by the resignation of Silas Lee (F) on August 20, 1801, prior to the beginning of the 1st Session of the 7th Congress.

== Election results ==
=== First three ballots ===
The first three ballots had similar results and were held on September 25 and December 7, 1801, and April 5, 1802

Candidate	Party	First ballot		Second ballot		Third ballot	
Candidate	Party	Votes	Percent	Votes	Percent	Votes	Percent
Orchard Cook	Democratic-Republican	521	47.9%	715	42.5%	1,394	45.0%
Martin Kingsley	Democratic-Republican	257	23.6%	575	34.2%	1,004	32.4%
Phineas Bruce	Federalist			120	7.1%	413	13.3%
Nathaniel Drummer	Unknown	262	24.1%	273	16.2%	285	9.2%
Scattering		47	4.3%				

=== Fourth and fifth ballots ===
Between the third and fourth ballots Cook and Drummer dropped out while Samuel Thatcher (DR) entered the race, eventually winning. The final two votes were held June 7, 1802 and July 29, 1802

Candidate	Party	Fourth ballot		Fifth ballot	
Candidate	Party	Votes	Percent	Votes	Percent
Samuel Thatcher	Democratic-Republican	436	33.0%	874	59.3%
Martin Kingsley	Democratic-Republican	595	45.0%	600	40.7%
Phineas Bruce	Federalist	110	8.3%		
Scattering		180	13.6%		

Thatcher took office on December 6, 1802

== See also ==
- List of special elections to the United States House of Representatives
