= 7th United States Congress =

1801–1803 U.S. Congress

←	6th	8th	→
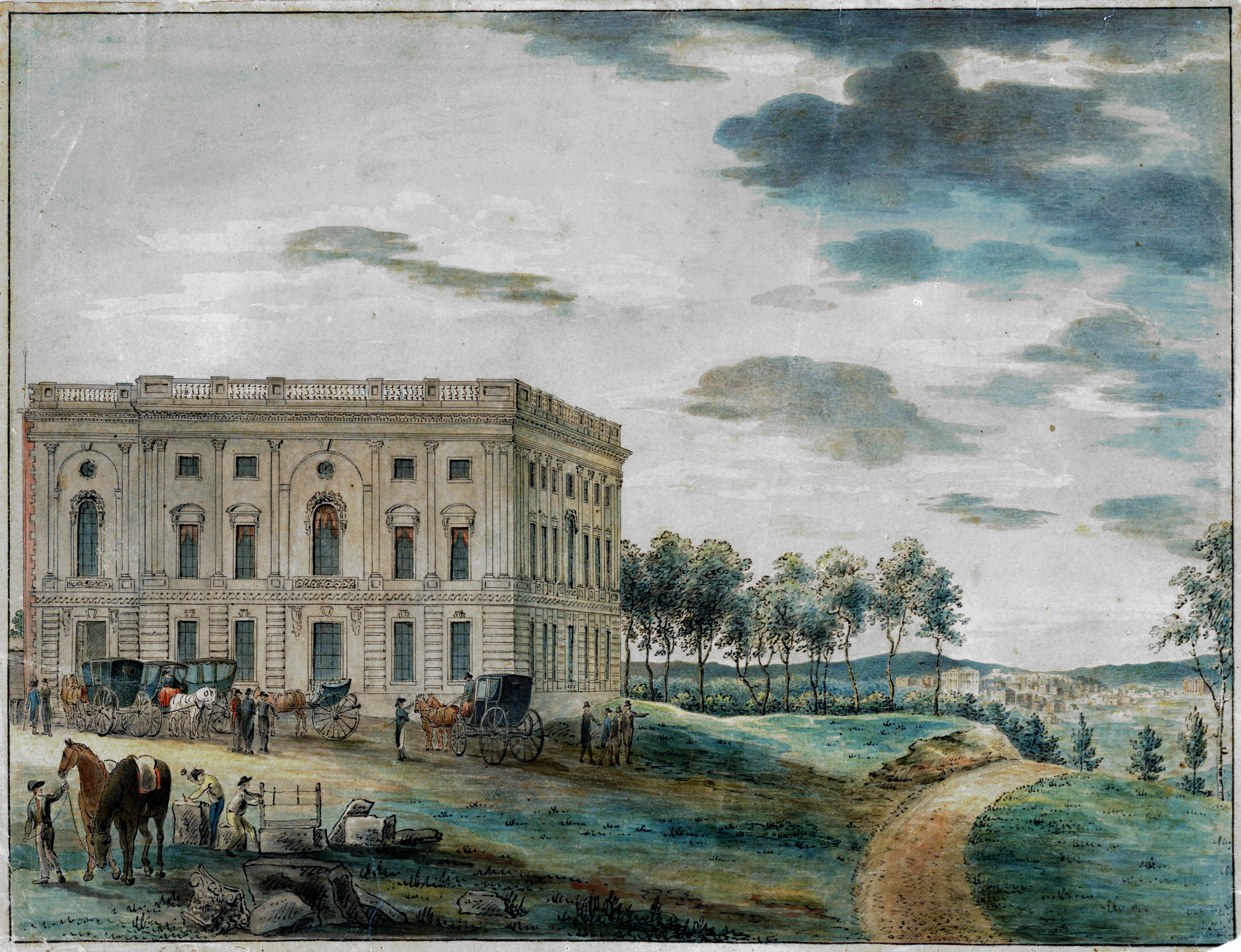
- United States Capitol (1800)

Overview
- Legislative body: United States Congress
- Jurisdiction: United States
- Term: March 4, 1801 – March 4, 1803

Senate
- Members: 34
- President: Aaron Burr (DR)
- President pro tempore: Abraham Baldwin (DR); Stephen R. Bradley (DR)
- Party control: Democratic-Republican (Federalist during 2-day special Senate session at start of the Congress)

House of Representatives
- Members: 107 representatives 2 non-voting delegates
- Speaker: Nathaniel Macon (DR)
- Party control: Democratic-Republican

Sessions
- Special (Note: Special session of the Senate.): March 4, 1801 – March 5, 1801
- 1st: December 7, 1801 – May 3, 1802
- 2nd: December 6, 1802 – March 3, 1803

The 7th United States Congress was a meeting of the legislative branch of the United States federal government, consisting of the United States Senate and the United States House of Representatives. It met in Washington, D.C. from March 4, 1801, to March 4, 1803, during the first two years of Thomas Jefferson's presidency. The apportionment of seats in the House of Representatives was based on the 1790 United States census. Both chambers had a Democratic-Republican majority, except when the Senate held a two-day Special Senate session in order to provide advice to the new President Thomas Jefferson, when there was still a Federalist majority in the Senate.

== Major events ==
- March 4, 1801: Thomas Jefferson became President of the United States.
- May 10, 1801: The pascha of Tripoli declared war on United States by having the flagpole on the consulate chopped down
- March 16, 1802: West Point established
- February 24, 1803: First time an Act of Congress was declared unconstitutional: U.S. Supreme Court case, Marbury v. Madison

== Major legislation ==
- April 29, 1802: Judiciary Act of 1802, ch. 31, 2 Stat. 156
- April 30, 1802: Enabling Act of 1802, ch. 40, 2 Stat. 173

== States admitted ==
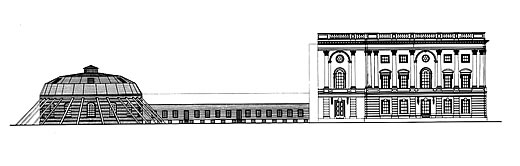
United States Capitol with "Brick Oven"

- Ohio was admitted as a state, having previously been a portion of the Northwest Territory. The exact date is unclear and in dispute, but it is undisputed that it was during this Congress. The official date when Ohio became a state was not set until 1953, when the 83rd U.S. Congress passed legislation retrospectively designating the date of the first meeting of the Ohio state legislature, March 1, 1803, as that date. However, on April 30, 1802, the 7th U.S. Congress had passed an act "authorizing the inhabitants of Ohio to form a Constitution and state government, and admission of Ohio into the Union." (Sess. 1, ch. 40, 2 Stat. 173) On February 19, 1803, the same Congress passed an act "providing for the execution of the laws of the United States in the State of Ohio." (Sess. 2, ch. 7, 2 Stat. 201) The Biographical Directory of the United States Congress states that Ohio was admitted to the Union on November 29, 1802, and counts its seats as vacant from that date.

== Party summary ==
The count below identifies party affiliations at the beginning of the first session of this Congress, and includes members from vacancies and newly admitted states, when they were first seated. Changes resulting from subsequent replacements are shown below in the "Changes in membership" section.

=== Senate ===
The Federalists still controlled the Senate when they held a two-day special Senate session in March 1801, which was called by outgoing President John Adams so that the Senate could provide advice to the new President Thomas Jefferson, but by the time Congress began its first regular session in December 1801 to start official business, the Democratic-Republicans had gained Senate control.

Affiliation	Party (Shading indicates majority caucus)			Vacant
Affiliation	Democratic-Republican	Federalist	Total	Vacant
End of previous Congress	11	21	32	0
Begin	14	18	32	0
March 5, 1801 (Note: Class 2 Rhode Island senator Ray Greene (F) resigned March 5, 1801, and Christopher Ellery (DR) was elected, then was seated on May 6, 1801 to continue that term.)	14	17	31	1
May 6, 1801	15	17	32	0
June 6, 1801 (Note: Charles Pinckney (DR) resigned June 6, 1801, after being appointed Minister to Spain. His successor Thomas Sumter (DR) was elected, then was seated on December 15, 1801.)	14	17	31	1
June 12, 1801 (Note: Samuel Livermore(F) resigned June 12, 1801. His successor Simeon Olcott (F) was elected, then was seated on June 17, 1801.)	14	16	30	2
June 17, 1801	14	17	31	1
June 30, 1801 (Note: Peter Muhlenberg (DR) resigned June 30, 1801. His successor George Logan (DR) was appointed July 13, 1801, and then elected December 17, 1801.)	13	17	30	2
July 13, 1801	14	17	31	1
September 1, 1801 (Note: Elijah Paine (F) resigned September 1, 1801. His successor Stephen R. Bradley (DR) was elected, and then was seated on October 1, 1801.)	14	16	30	2
October 1, 1801	15	16	31	1
November 19, 1801 (Note: William Hindman (F) resigned November 19, 1801. His successor Robert Wright (DR) was elected and seated that same day.)	16	15	31	1
December 15, 1801	17	15	32	0
February 5, 1802 (Note: John Armstrong Jr. (DR) resigned February 5, 1802. His successor Dewitt Clinton (DR) was elected, then was seated February 9, 1802.)	16	15	31	1
February 9, 1802	17	15	32	0
June 14, 1802 (Note: James Sheafe (F) resigned June 14, 1802. His successor William Plumer (F) was elected, then was seated June 17, 1802.)	17	14	31	1
June 17, 1802	17	15	32	0
October 26, 1802 (Note: John E. Colhoun (DR) died October 26, 1802. His successor Pierce Butler (DR) was elected, then was seated November 4, 1802.)	16	15	31	1
November 4, 1802	17	15	32	0
November 29, 1802 (Note: Ohio was admitted to the Union on November 29, 1802. These two Ohio senate seats would remain vacant for the remainder of this Congress and for the beginning part of the next Congress.)	17	15	32	2
March 2, 1803 (Note: Dwight Foster (F) resigned March 2, 1803. His seat remained vacant for the remainder of Congress.)	17	14	31	3
Final voting share	54.8%	45.2%		
Beginning of the next Congress	22	9	31	3

=== House of Representatives ===
State shares of party representatives

	Party (shading shows control)		Total	Vacant
	Democratic- Republican (DR)	Federalist (F)	Total	Vacant
End of previous congress	49	56	105	1
Begin	67	36	103	3
End	67	38	105	2
Final voting share	63.8%	36.2%		
Beginning of next congress	113	26	139	3

== Leadership ==
=== Senate ===
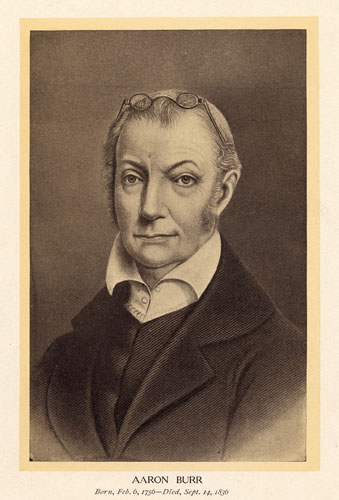
President of the Senate
Aaron Burr

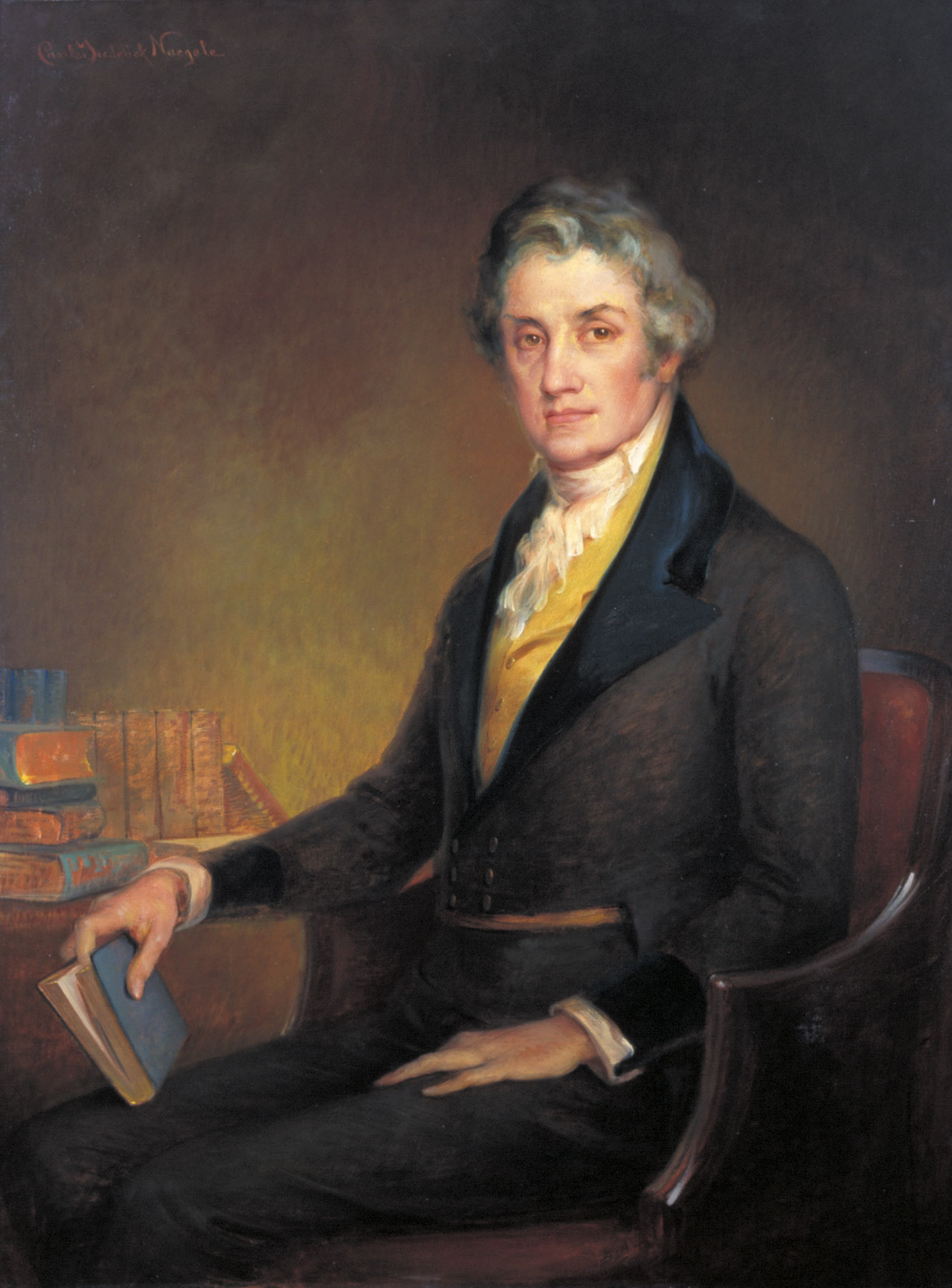
President pro tempore of the Senate
Abraham Baldwin

- President: Aaron Burr (DR)
- President pro tempore: Abraham Baldwin (DR), first elected December 7, 1801
  - Stephen R. Bradley (DR), first elected December 14, 1802

=== House of Representatives ===
- Speaker: Nathaniel Macon, (DR), elected December 7, 1801

== Members ==
This list is arranged by chamber, then by state. Senators are listed by class, and representatives are listed by district.

=== Senate ===
Skip to House of Representatives, below

Senators were elected by the state legislatures every two years, with one-third beginning new six-year terms with each Congress. Preceding the names in the list below are Senate class numbers, which indicate the cycle of their election. In this Congress, Class 1 meant their term ended with this Congress, facing re-election in 1802; Class 2 meant their term began in the last Congress, facing re-election in 1804; and Class 3 meant their term began in this Congress, facing re-election in 1806.

==== Connecticut ====
▌1. James Hillhouse (F)
▌3. Uriah Tracy (F)

==== Delaware ====
▌1. Samuel White (F)
▌2. William H. Wells (F)

==== Georgia ====
▌2. Abraham Baldwin (DR)
▌3. James Jackson (DR)

==== Kentucky ====
▌2. John Brown (DR)
▌3. John Breckinridge (DR)

==== Maryland ====
▌1. John Eager Howard (F)
▌3. William Hindman (F), until November 19, 1801

▌Robert Wright (DR), from November 19, 1801

==== Massachusetts ====
▌1. Jonathan Mason (F)
▌2. Dwight Foster (F), until March 2, 1803

==== New Hampshire ====
▌2. Samuel Livermore (F), until June 12, 1801

▌Simeon Olcott (F), from June 17, 1801

▌3. James Sheafe (F), until June 14, 1802

▌William Plumer (F), from June 17, 1802

==== New Jersey ====
▌1. Aaron Ogden (F)
▌2. Jonathan Dayton (F)

==== New York ====
▌1. Gouverneur Morris (F)
▌3. John Armstrong Jr. (DR), until February 5, 1802

▌DeWitt Clinton (DR), from February 9, 1802

==== North Carolina ====
▌2. Jesse Franklin (DR)
▌3. David Stone (DR)

==== Ohio ====
Due to uncertainty over Ohio's exact admittance date (see "States admitted, above") its two senators were not elected until the next Congress.

1: Vacant (newly admitted state)
3: Vacant (newly admitted state)

==== Pennsylvania ====
▌1. James Ross (F)
▌3. John Peter G. Muhlenberg (DR), until June 30, 1801

▌George Logan (DR), from July 13, 1801

==== Rhode Island ====
▌1. Theodore Foster (F)
▌2. Ray Greene (F), until March 5, 1801

▌Christopher Ellery (DR), from May 6, 1801

==== South Carolina ====
▌2. Charles Pinckney (DR), until June 6, 1801

▌Thomas Sumter (DR), from December 15, 1801

▌3. John E. Colhoun (DR), until October 26, 1802

▌Pierce Butler (DR), from November 4, 1802

==== Tennessee ====
▌1. Joseph Anderson (DR)
▌2. William Cocke (DR)

==== Vermont ====
▌1. Nathaniel Chipman (F)
▌3. Elijah Paine (F), until September 1, 1801

▌Stephen R. Bradley (DR), from October 15, 1801

==== Virginia ====
▌1. Stevens Mason (DR)
▌2. Wilson C. Nicholas (DR)

Senators' party membership by state at the opening of the 7th Congress in March 1801. 2 Democratic-Republicans 1 Democratic-Republican and 1 Federalist 2 Federalists

=== House of Representatives ===
The names of representatives elected statewide on the general ticket or otherwise at-large, are preceded by an "At-large," and the names of those elected from districts, whether plural or single member, are preceded by their district numbers.

==== Connecticut ====
All representatives were elected statewide on a general ticket.

▌At-large. Samuel W. Dana (F)
▌At-large. John Davenport (F)
▌At-large. Calvin Goddard (F), from May 14, 1801
▌At-large. Roger Griswold (F)
▌At-large. Elias Perkins (F)
▌At-large. John Cotton Smith (F)
▌At-large. Benjamin Tallmadge (F)

==== Delaware ====
▌At-large. James A. Bayard (F)

==== Georgia ====
All representatives were elected statewide on a general ticket.

▌At-large. John Milledge (DR), until May 1802

▌Peter Early (DR), from January 10, 1803

▌At-large. Benjamin Taliaferro (DR), until May 1802

▌David Meriwether (DR), from December 6, 1802

==== Kentucky ====
▌1. Thomas T. Davis (DR)
▌2. John Fowler (DR)

==== Maryland ====
▌1. John Campbell (F)
▌2. Richard Sprigg Jr. (DR), until February 11, 1802

▌Walter Bowie (DR), from March 24, 1802

▌3. Thomas Plater (F)
▌4. Daniel Hiester (DR)
▌5. Samuel Smith (DR)
▌6. John Archer (DR)
▌7. Joseph H. Nicholson (DR)
▌8. John Dennis (F)

==== Massachusetts ====
▌1. John Bacon (DR)
▌2. William Shepard (F)
▌3. Ebenezer Mattoon (F)
▌4. Levi Lincoln Sr. (DR), until March 5, 1801

▌Seth Hastings (F), from January 11, 1802

▌5. Lemuel Williams (F)
▌6. Josiah Smith (DR)
▌7. Phanuel Bishop (DR)
▌8. William Eustis (DR)
▌9. Joseph Bradley Varnum (DR)
▌10. Nathan Read (F)
▌11. Manasseh Cutler (F)
▌12. Silas Lee (F), until August 20, 1801

▌Samuel Thatcher (F), from December 6, 1802

▌13. Peleg Wadsworth (F)
▌14. Richard Cutts (DR), from December 7, 1801

==== New Hampshire ====
All representatives were elected statewide on a general ticket.

▌At-large. Abiel Foster (F)
▌At-large. Joseph Peirce (F), until June 1802

▌Samuel Hunt (F), from December 6, 1802

▌At-large. Samuel Tenney (F)
▌At-large. George B. Upham (F)

==== New Jersey ====
All representatives were elected statewide on a general ticket.

▌At-large. John Condit (DR)
▌At-large. Ebenezer Elmer (DR)
▌At-large. William Helms (DR)
▌At-large. James Mott (DR)
▌At-large. Henry Southard (DR)

==== New York ====
▌1. John Smith (DR)
▌2. Samuel L. Mitchill (DR)
▌3. Philip Van Cortlandt (DR)
▌4. Lucas C. Elmendorf (DR)
▌5. Thomas Tillotson (DR), until August 10, 1801

▌Theodorus Bailey (DR), from December 7, 1801

▌6. John Bird (F), until July 25, 1801

▌John P. Van Ness (DR), December 7, 1801 – January 17, 1803; vacant thereafter

▌7. David Thomas (DR)
▌8. Killian K. Van Rensselaer (F)
▌9. Benjamin Walker (F)
▌10. Thomas Morris (F)

==== North Carolina ====
▌1. James Holland (DR)
▌2. Archibald Henderson (F)
▌3. Robert Williams (DR)
▌4. Richard Stanford (DR)
▌5. Nathaniel Macon (DR)
▌6. William H. Hill (F)
▌7. William Barry Grove (F)
▌8. Charles Johnson (DR), from December 7, 1801 until July 23, 1802

▌Thomas Wynns (DR), from December 7, 1802

▌▌9. Willis Alston (F, then D-R)
▌10. John Stanly (F)

==== Ohio ====
At-large. vacant (newly admitted state)

==== Pennsylvania ====
▌1. William Jones (DR)
▌2. Michael Leib (DR)
▌3. Joseph Hemphill (F)
▌4A: Robert Brown (DR)
▌4B: Isaac Van Horne (DR)
▌5. Joseph Hiester (DR)
▌6. John A. Hanna (DR)
▌7. Thomas Boude (F)
▌8. John Stewart (DR)
▌9. Andrew Gregg (DR)
▌10. Henry Woods (F)
▌11. John Smilie (DR)
▌12. William Hoge (DR)

==== Rhode Island ====
Both representatives were elected statewide on a general ticket.

▌At-large. Joseph Stanton Jr. (DR)
▌At-large. Thomas Tillinghast (DR)

==== South Carolina ====
▌1. Thomas Lowndes (F)
▌2. John Rutledge Jr. (F)
▌3. Benjamin Huger (F)
▌4. Thomas Sumter (DR), until December 15, 1801

▌Richard Winn (DR), from January 24, 1802

▌5. William Butler Sr. (DR)
▌6. Thomas Moore (DR)

==== Tennessee ====
▌At-large. William Dickson (DR)

==== Vermont ====
▌1. Israel Smith (DR)
▌2. Lewis R. Morris (F)

==== Virginia ====
▌1. John Smith (DR)
▌2. David Holmes (DR)
▌3. George Jackson (DR)
▌4. Abram Trigg (DR)
▌5. John J. Trigg (DR)
▌6. Matthew Clay (DR)
▌7. John Randolph (DR)
▌8. Thomas Claiborne (DR)
▌9. William B. Giles (DR)
▌10. Edwin Gray (DR)
▌11. Thomas Newton Jr. (DR)
▌12. John Stratton (F)
▌13. John Clopton (DR)
▌14. Samuel J. Cabell (DR)
▌15. John Dawson (DR)
▌16. Anthony New (DR)
▌17. Richard Brent (DR)
▌18. Philip R. Thompson (DR)
▌19. John Taliaferro (DR)

==== Non-voting members ====
Mississippi Territory. ▌Narsworthy Hunter (DR), until March 11, 1802

▌Thomas M. Green Jr. (DR), from December 6, 1802

▌Northwest Territory. Paul Fearing (F)

== Changes in membership ==
The count below reflects changes from the beginning of the first session of this Congress.

=== Senate ===
There was 1 death, 8 resignations, and 2 seats added for a new state.

Senate changes
State (class)	Vacated by	Reason for change	Successor	Date of successor's formal installation (Note: When seated or oath administered, not necessarily when service began.)
Rhode Island (2)	Ray Greene (F)	Resigned March 5, 1801, after being nominated for a judicial position. His successor was elected.	Christopher Ellery (DR)	Seated May 6, 1801
South Carolina (2)	Charles Pinckney (DR)	Resigned June 6, 1801, after being appointed Minister to Spain. His successor was elected.	Thomas Sumter (DR)	Seated December 15, 1801
New Hampshire (2)	Samuel Livermore (F)	Resigned June 12, 1801. His successor was elected.	Simeon Olcott (F)	Seated June 17, 1801
Pennsylvania (3)	Peter Muhlenberg (DR)	Resigned June 30, 1801. His successor was appointed July 13, 1801, and then elected December 17, 1801.	George Logan (DR)	Seated July 13, 1801
Vermont (3)	Elijah Paine (F)	Resigned September 1, 1801. His successor was elected.	Stephen R. Bradley (DR)	Seated October 15, 1801
Maryland (3)	William Hindman (F)	Resigned November 19, 1801. His successor was elected.	Robert Wright (DR)	Seated November 19, 1801
Massachusetts (3)	Dwight Foster (F)	Resigned March 2, 1803. Not filled this Congress	Vacant	
New York (3)	John Armstrong Jr. (DR)	Resigned February 5, 1802. His successor was elected.	DeWitt Clinton (DR)	Seated February 9, 1802
New Hampshire (3)	James Sheafe (F)	Resigned June 14, 1802. His successor was elected.	William Plumer (F)	Seated June 17, 1802
South Carolina (3)	John E. Colhoun (DR)	Died October 26, 1802. His successor was elected.	Pierce Butler (DR)	Seated November 4, 1802
Ohio (1)	New seats	Ohio was admitted to the Union on November 29, 1802.	Vacant	Not filled this Congress
Ohio (3)	New seats	Ohio was admitted to the Union on November 29, 1802.	Vacant	Not filled this Congress

=== House of Representatives ===
- Replacements: 8
  - Democratic-Republicans: no net change
  - Federalists: no net change
- Deaths: 1
- Resignations: 9
- Forfeiture: 1
- Vacancy: 1
- Total seats with changes: 11

House changes
District	Vacated by	Reason for change	Successor	Date of successor's formal installation
Connecticut at-large	Vacant	Elizur Goodrich (F) resigned before the beginning of this Congress.	Calvin Goddard (F)	May 14, 1801
Connecticut at-large	Vacant	William Edmond (F) resigned before the beginning of this Congress.	Benjamin Tallmadge (F)	September 21, 1801
Massachusetts 14th	Vacant	Representative-elect George Thatcher declined to serve. Successor elected June 22, 1801.	Richard Cutts (DR)	December 7, 1801
Massachusetts 4th	Levi Lincoln (DR)	Resigned March 5, 1801, after being appointed US Attorney General.	Seth Hastings (F)	January 11, 1802
New York 6th	John Bird (F)	Resigned July 25, 1801.	John Peter Van Ness (DR)	December 7, 1801
New York 5th	Thomas Tillotson (DR)	Resigned August 10, 1801, upon appointment as NY Secretary of State.	Theodorus Bailey (DR)	December 7, 1801
Massachusetts 12th	Silas Lee (F)	Resigned August 20, 1801.	Samuel Thatcher (F)	December 6, 1802
South Carolina 4th	Thomas Sumter (DR)	Resigned December 15, 1801, after being elected to the US Senate.	Richard Winn (DR)	January 24, 1802
Georgia at-large	Benjamin Taliaferro (DR)	Resigned sometime in 1802.	David Meriwether (DR)	December 6, 1802
New Hampshire at-large	Joseph Peirce (F)	Resigned sometime in 1802.	Samuel Hunt (F)	December 6, 1802
Maryland 2nd	Richard Sprigg Jr. (DR)	Resigned February 11, 1802.	Walter Bowie (DR)	March 24, 1802
Mississippi Territory at-large	Narsworthy Hunter (DR)	Died March 11, 1802.	Thomas M. Green Jr. (DR)	December 6, 1802
Georgia at-large	John Milledge (DR)	Resigned May 1802 after being elected Governor.	Peter Early (DR)	January 10, 1803
North Carolina 8th	Charles Johnson (DR)	Died July 23, 1802.	Thomas Wynns (DR)	December 7, 1802
Ohio at-large	New seat	Ohio was admitted to the Union on November 29, 1802.	Vacant	Not filled until next Congress
New York 6th	John Peter Van Ness (DR)	Seat declared forfeited January 17, 1803.	Vacant	Not filled until next Congress

== Committees ==
Lists of committees and their party leaders.

=== Senate ===
- Whole

=== House of Representatives ===
- Claims (Chairman: John C. Smith)
- Commerce and Manufactures (Chairman: Samuel Smith)
- Elections (Chairman: John Milledge then John Bacon)
- Revisal and Unfinished Business (Chairman: John Davenport)
- Rules (Select)
- Standards of Official Conduct (Chairman: N/A)
- Ways and Means (Chairman: John Randolph)
- Whole

=== Joint committees ===
- Enrolled Bills (Chairman: Dwight Foster)

== Officers ==
=== Legislative branch agency directors ===
- Architect of the Capitol: William Thornton
- Librarian of Congress: John J. Beckley, from 1802

=== Senate ===
- Chaplain: Thomas J. Claggett (Episcopalian), until December 9, 1801
  - Edward Gantt (Episcopalian), elected December 9, 1801
- Secretary: Samuel A. Otis
- Doorkeeper: James Mathers

=== House of Representatives ===
- Chaplain: Thomas Lyell (Methodist), until December 10, 1801
  - William Parkinson (Baptist), elected December 10, 1801
- Clerk: John Holt Oswald, until December 7, 1801
  - John Beckley, elected December 7, 1801
- Doorkeeper: Thomas Claxton
- Sergeant at Arms: Joseph Wheaton

== See also ==
- 1800 United States elections (elections leading to this Congress)
  - 1800 United States presidential election
  - 1800–01 United States Senate elections
  - 1800–01 United States House of Representatives elections
- 1802 United States elections (elections during this Congress, leading to the next Congress)
  - 1802–03 United States Senate elections
  - 1802–03 United States House of Representatives elections
