= Thomas Boude =

American politician

Member of the U.S. House of Representatives from Pennsylvania's 7th district
- In office March 4, 1801 – March 3, 1803
- Preceded by: John W. Kittera
- Succeeded by: John Rea

Member of the Pennsylvania House of Representatives
- In office 1794-1796

Personal details
- Born: May 17, 1752 Lancaster, Province of Pennsylvania, British America
- Died: October 24, 1822 (aged 70) Columbia, Pennsylvania, U.S.
- Party: Federalist

Thomas Boude (May 17, 1752 – October 24, 1822) was a member of the United States House of Representatives from Pennsylvania.

Thomas Boude was born in Lancaster in the Province of Pennsylvania. During the American Revolutionary War, he served as a lieutenant under Gen. Anthony Wayne with the Second, Fourth, and Fifth Pennsylvania Battalions from January 5, 1776, to November 3, 1783, and was promoted to captain and brevet major. Pennsylvania Archives state that on April 13, 1796, Governor Thomas Mifflin made him a General. He engaged in business as a lumber dealer in Columbia, Pennsylvania. He was a member and one of the organizers of the Society of the Cincinnati.

He was a member of the Pennsylvania House of Representatives from 1794 to 1796 and was elected as a Federalist to the Seventh Congress. However, he was an unsuccessful candidate for reelection in 1802 to the Eighth Congress. He resumed his former business as a lumber dealer and died in Columbia, Pennsylvania, on October 24, 1822. He is buried in that part of Mount Bethel Cemetery known as the "Brick Graveyard."

U.S. House of Representatives
Preceded by John W. Kittera	Member of the U.S. House of Representatives from Pennsylvania's 7th congressional district 1801–1803	Succeeded by John Rea
