= 1800 United States House of Representatives elections in New York =

United States House of Representatives elections in New York, 1800
- April 29-May 1, 1800

All 10 New York seats to the United States House of Representatives
	Majority party	Minority party
Party	Democratic-Republican	Federalist
Last election	6	4
Seats won	6	4
Seat change	Steady	Steady
Popular vote	25,040	21,031
Percentage	54.4%	45.6%

The 1800 United States House of Representatives elections in New York were held from April 29 to May 1, 1800, to elect ten U.S. Representatives to represent the State of New York in the United States House of Representatives of the 7th United States Congress.

== Background ==
Ten U.S. Representatives had been elected in April 1798 to a term in the 6th United States Congress beginning on March 4, 1797. Jonathan N. Havens had died in October 1799, and John Smith was elected to fill the vacancy. Their term would end on March 3, 1801. The congressional elections were held together with the State elections in late April, about ten months before the term would start on March 4, 1801, and about a year and a half before Congress actually met on December 7, 1801.

== Congressional districts ==
On March 27, 1797, the New York State Legislature had re-apportioned the congressional districts. The districts remained the same as at the previous election in April 1798, but two new counties were created in 1799: in the 7th D., Essex Co. was split from Clinton Co.; and in the 10th D., Cayuga Co. was split from Onondaga Co.

- The 1st District comprising Kings, Queens, Suffolk and Richmond counties.
- The 2nd District comprising the first six wards of New York County.
- The 3rd District comprising the 7th Ward of New York County, and Westchester and Rockland counties.
- The 4th District comprising Orange, Ulster and Delaware counties.
- The 5th District comprising Dutchess County.
- The 6th District comprising Columbia and Rensselaer counties.
- The 7th District comprising Clinton, Saratoga, Washington and Essex counties.
- The 8th District comprising Albany and Schoharie counties.
- The 9th District comprising Herkimer, Montgomery, Chenango and Oneida counties.
- The 10th District comprising Ontario, Otsego, Tioga, Onondaga, Steuben and Cayuga counties.

Note: There are now 62 counties in the State of New York. The counties which are not mentioned in this list had not yet been established, or sufficiently organized, the area being included in one or more of the abovementioned counties.

== Result ==
6 Democratic-Republicans and 4 Federalists were elected. The incumbents Smith, Van Cortlandt, Elmendorf and Bird were re-elected.

1800 United States House election result
District	Democratic-Republican		Federalist		Also ran	
1	John Smith	2,259	Silas Wood	1,774		
2	Samuel L. Mitchill	2,180	Jacob Morton	2,091		
3	Philip Van Cortlandt	2,070	Samuel Bayard	1,400		
4	Lucas Elmendorf	3,305	Leonard Bronk	178	John Hathorn (DR)	2,026
5	Thomas Tillotson	1,991	David Brooks	1,244		
6	Henry W. Livingston (DR)	2,085	John Bird	2,446	John Woodworth (DR)	52
7	David Thomas	2,987	John Williams	2,810	John Thompson (DR)	78
8	George Tiffany	1,093	Killian K. Van Rensselaer	1,350	Henry Glen (Fed.)	239
9	Jacob Eaker	2,274	Benjamin Walker	4,238		
10	William Stuart	2,377	Thomas Morris	3,261	John Paterson (DR)	263

Note: The Anti-Federalists called themselves "Republicans." However, at the same time, the Federalists called them "Democrats" which was meant to be pejorative. After some time both terms got more and more confused, and sometimes used together as "Democratic Republicans" which later historians have adopted (with a hyphen) to describe the party from the beginning, to avoid confusion with both the later established and still existing Democratic and Republican parties.

== Aftermath and special elections ==
Dem.-Rep. Thomas Tillotson, who had been elected in the 5th D., was appointed Secretary of State of New York on August 10, 1801, and resigned his seat before Congress met.

Fed. John Bird, who had been re-elected in the 6th D. to a second term, resigned his seat on July 25, 1801, before Congress met.

Special elections to fill the vacancies were held in October 1801, and were won by Theodorus Bailey and John P. Van Ness, both Dem.-Rep. Thus New York was represented by 7 Democratic-Republicans and 3 Federalists in the House of the 7th Congress.

1801 United States House special election result
District	Democratic-Republican		Federalist	
5	Theodorus Bailey	915	Samuel Mott	650
6	John P. Van Ness	1,981	Hezekiah L. Hosmer	1,111

The House of Representatives of the 7th United States Congress met for the first time at the United States Capitol in Washington, D.C., on December 7, 1801, and all ten representatives from New York took their seats on this day.

John P. Van Ness was appointed by President Thomas Jefferson as a major in the militia of the Territory of Columbia and on January 17, 1803, his seat was declared vacant.

== Sources ==
- The New York Civil List compiled in 1858 (see: pg. 65 for district apportionment; pg. 68 for Congressmen)
- Election result 1st D. at Tufts University Library project "A New Nation Votes", compiled by Phil Lampi
- Election result 2nd D. at "A New Nation Votes"
- Election result 3rd D. at "A New Nation Votes"
- Election result 4th D. at "A New Nation Votes"
- Election result 5th D. at "A New Nation Votes"
- Election result 6th D. at "A New Nation Votes"
- Election result 7th D. at "A New Nation Votes"
- Election result 8th D. at "A New Nation Votes"
- Election result 9th D. at "A New Nation Votes"
- Election result 10th D. at "A New Nation Votes"
- Special election result 5th D. at "A New Nation Votes"
- Special election result 6th D. at "A New Nation Votes"
