= Strawberry Hill (Edenton, North Carolina) =

Historic house in North Carolina, United States

- U.S. National Register of Historic Places
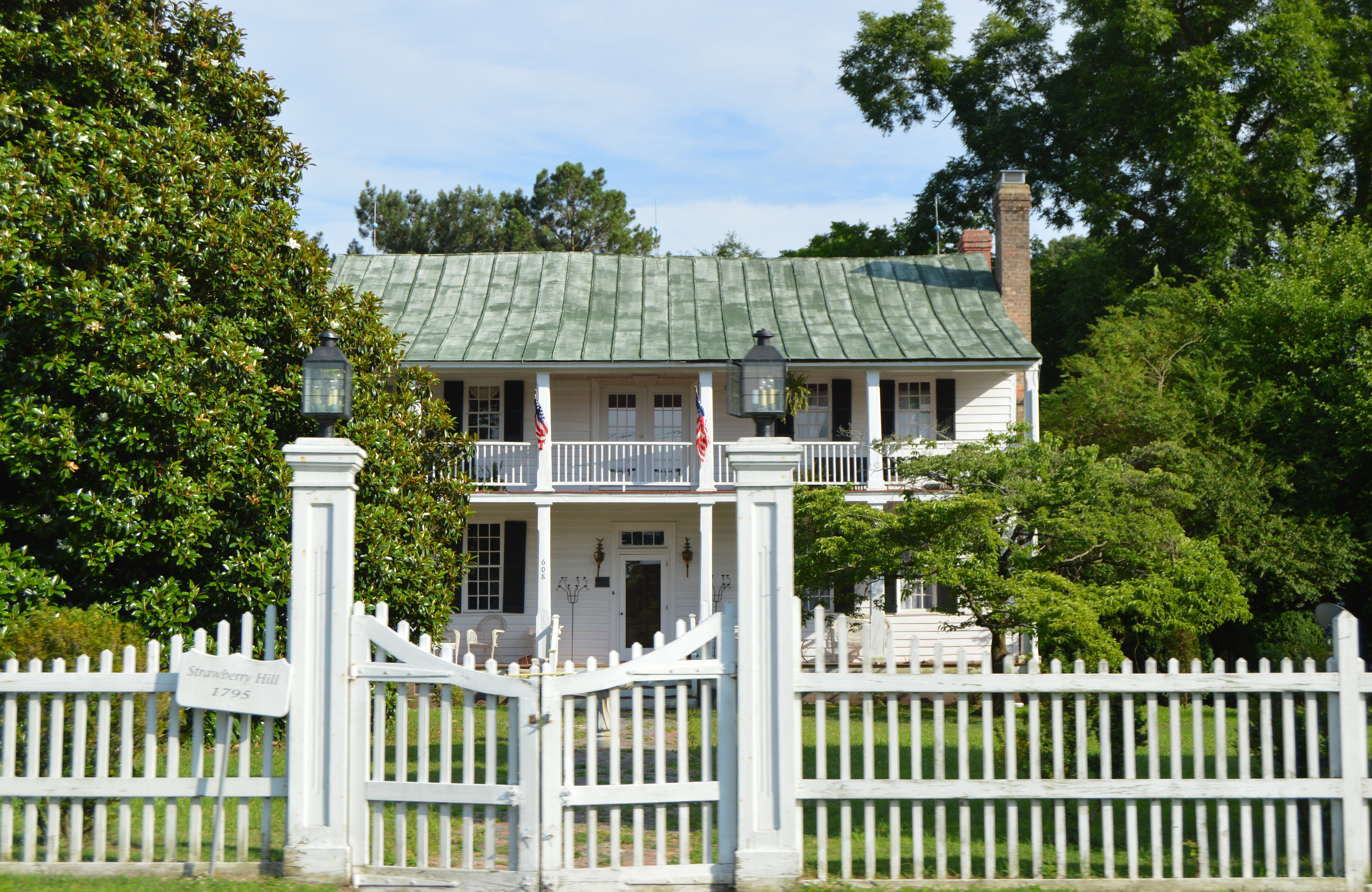
- Facade

- Location within North Carolina Location within the United States
- Location: Church St., Edenton, North Carolina
- Coordinates: 36°3′40.5″N 76°35′46.51″W
- Area: 3.5 acres (1.4 ha)
- Built: c. 1788
- Architectural style: Georgian, Federal
- NRHP reference No.: 80002810
- Added to NRHP: May 22, 1980

Strawberry Hill is a historic plantation house located in Edenton, North Carolina, and owned by William Raucci and Laurie Edwards. The original section was built about 1788 in a Georgian/Federal style then enlarged to its present size in the early- to mid-19th century. It is a two-story, frame dwelling with a center hall plan. The front facade features a two-tiered, full-length porch. The original portion of the house was built by Congressman Charles Johnson.

It was listed on the National Register of Historic Places in 1980.
