= Thomas W. Thompson =

American politician

Thomas Weston Thompson
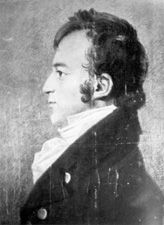

Member of the New Hampshire House of Representatives
- In office 1807–1808

Member of the New Hampshire House of Representatives
- In office 1813–1814

Member of the U.S. House of Representatives from New Hampshire's at-large district
- In office March 4, 1805 – March 3, 1807
- Preceded by: Samuel Hunt
- Succeeded by: Daniel Meserve Durell

United States Senator from New Hampshire
- In office June 24, 1814 – March 3, 1817
- Preceded by: Nicholas Gilman
- Succeeded by: David L. Morril

Personal details
- Born: March 15, 1766 Boston, Province of Massachusetts Bay, British America
- Died: October 1, 1821 (aged 55) Concord, New Hampshire, U.S.
- Resting place: Old North Cemetery
- Party: Federalist
- Spouse: Elizabeth C. Porter
- Children: William Coombs Thompson; Charles Edward Thompson
- Education: Harvard College
- Profession: Attorney; Politician

Thomas Weston Thompson (March 15, 1766 – October 1, 1821) was an American attorney and Federalist politician in the U.S. state of New Hampshire. He served as a United States representative and United States Senator during the 1800s.

== Early life and career ==
Thompson was born in Boston in the Province of Massachusetts Bay, the son of Thomas and Isabella Thompson. The family moved to Newburyport, Massachusetts, when Thompson was young. He attended Dummer Academy in Byfield, Massachusetts, and served as an aide to General Lincoln during Shays' Rebellion. Thompson graduated from Harvard University in 1786 and began studying for the ministry. He was a tutor at Harvard from 1789 to 1791.

He read law, was admitted to the bar in 1791 and practiced law in Salisbury, New Hampshire, from 1791 to 1810. Among the younger men he mentored was Daniel Webster, who started as a law apprentice with him around 1801. Thompson was appointed postmaster of Salisbury, serving from 1798 to 1803. He served for more than two decades as a trustee of Dartmouth College, from 1801 to 1821.

== Political career ==
In 1810, Thompson moved to Concord, New Hampshire where he continued the practice of law. He was elected as a member of the New Hampshire House of Representatives, serving from 1807 to 1808. He was treasurer of New Hampshire in 1810. He was reelected to serve in the State House from 1813 to 1814 and elected Speaker.

Thompson was elected as a Federalist to the Ninth U.S. Congress, serving from March 4, 1805, to March 3, 1807. He was appointed state treasurer of New Hampshire from 1809 to 1811. Thompson was elected to the United States Senate to fill the vacancy caused by the death of Nicholas Gilman, serving from June 24, 1814, to March 3, 1817.

He died in Concord in 1821; interment was in the Old North Cemetery.

== Personal life ==
Thompson married Elizabeth C. Porter on December 25, 1796. They had two sons, William Coombs Thompson and Charles Edward Thompson.

U.S. House of Representatives
Preceded by Samuel Hunt	Member of the U.S. House of Representatives from New Hampshire's at-large congressional district 1805–1807	Succeeded by Daniel M. Durell
U.S. Senate
Preceded by Nicholas Gilman	U.S. senator (Class 2) from New Hampshire; 1814–1817; Served alongside: Jeremiah Mason	Succeeded by David L. Morril
