= 1800 United States elections =

- ← 1798 1799 1800 1801 1802 → Presidential election year
- Incumbent president: ▌John Adams (F)
- Next Congress: 7th

Presidential election
- Partisan control: Democratic-Republican gain
- Electoral vote
- Thomas Jefferson (DR): 73
- John Adams (F): 65
- 1800 presidential election results. Green denotes states won by Jefferson, burnt orange denotes states won by Adams. Numbers indicate the number of electoral votes allotted to each state.

Senate elections
- Overall control: Federalist hold
- Seats contested: 10 of 32 seats
- Net seat change: Democratic-Republican +3

House elections
- Overall control: Democratic-Republican gain
- Seats contested: All 106 voting members
- Net seat change: Democratic-Republican +22

Elections were held for the 7th United States Congress, in 1800 and 1801. The election took place during the First Party System, and is generally considered the first realigning election in American history. It was the first peaceful transfer of power between parties in American history. The Democratic-Republican Party won control of the presidency and both houses of Congress for the first time. Conversely, the Federalist Party would never again control the presidency or either house of Congress. Ohio was admitted as a state during the 7th Congress.

In the presidential election, the Democratic-Republican Vice President Thomas Jefferson became the first Democratic-Republican President, narrowly defeating the incumbent Federalist President John Adams. Jefferson again won the South and Adams again won New England, but Jefferson won by adding New York and Maryland. Jefferson tied his own running mate, former Senator Aaron Burr of New York, in electoral votes, necessitating a contingent election in the House that Jefferson won. Burr, as the runner-up, was elected vice president. The contingent election led to the passage of the Twelfth Amendment, which altered the electoral college so that electors in all future elections cast an electoral vote for president and a separate electoral vote for vice president.

In the House, Democratic-Republicans won major gains, taking control of the chamber. In the Senate, Democratic-Republicans picked up several seats, taking control of the chamber for the first time in the party's history. This marked the first of three times in American history where one party flipped both chambers of Congress and the presidency in a single election, along with 1840 and 1952.

== See also ==
- 1800 United States presidential election
- 1800–01 United States House of Representatives elections
- 1800–01 United States Senate elections
