= April 1802 Georgia's at-large congressional district special election =

A special election was held in Georgia's at-large congressional district on April 26, 1802, to fill a vacancy caused by the 1802 resignation of Benjamin Taliaferro.

- David Meriwether (Democratic-Republican) 86.95%
- Samuel Hammond 7.72%
- William Bryant 2.94%
- Francis Willis 1.02%
- William Stith 0.81%
- Thomas P. Carnes 0.34%
- James MacNeil 0.21%

== See also ==
- List of special elections to the United States House of Representatives
