= 1802 Connecticut lieutenant gubernatorial election =

- April 12, 1802
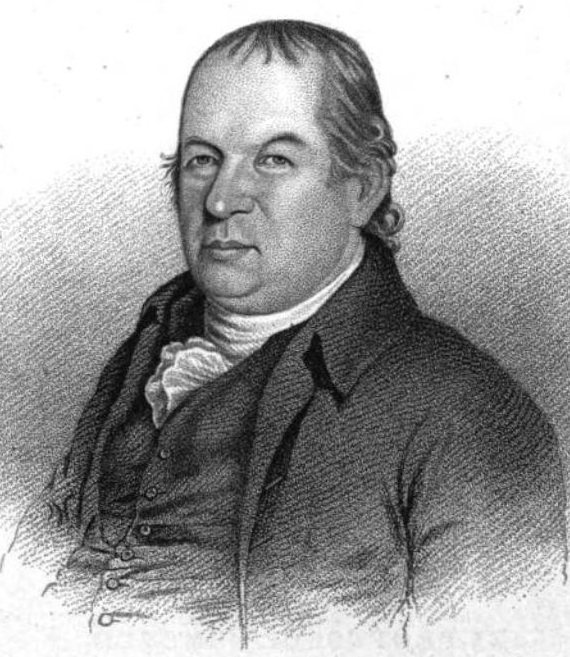

Nominee	John Treadwell	David Turnbull
Party	Federalist	Democratic-Republican
Popular vote	9,085	3,913
Percentage	66.80%	28.80%
Lieutenant Governor before election
John Treadwell
Federalist
Elected Lieutenant Governor
John Treadwell
Federalist

The 1802 Connecticut lieutenant gubernatorial election was held on April 12, 1802, in order to elect the lieutenant governor of Connecticut. Incumbent Federalist lieutenant governor John Treadwell defeated Democratic-Republican candidate David Turnbull and other candidates.

== General election ==
On election day, April 12, 1802, incumbent Federalist lieutenant governor John Treadwell won re-election by a margin of 5,172 votes against his foremost opponent Democratic-Republican candidate David Turnbull, thereby retaining Federalist control over the office of lieutenant governor. Treadwell was sworn in for his fifth term on May 13, 1802.

=== Results ===
Connecticut lieutenant gubernatorial election, 1802
Party	Candidate	Votes	%
Federalist	John Treadwell (incumbent)	9,085	66.80
Democratic-Republican	David Turnbull	3,913	28.80
	Scattering	596	4.40
Total votes		13,594	100.00
Federalist hold			
