= 1802 United States elections =

- ← 1800 1801 1802 1803 1804 → Midterm elections
- Incumbent president: ▌Thomas Jefferson (DR)
- Next Congress: 8th

Senate elections
- Overall control: Democratic-Republican hold
- Seats contested: 11 of 34 seats
- Net seat change: Democratic-Republican +5

House elections
- Overall control: Democratic-Republican hold
- Seats contested: All 142 voting seats
- Net seat change: Democratic-Republican +35

Elections to the 8th United States Congress were held in 1802 and 1803, during the middle of Democratic-Republican President Thomas Jefferson's first term. The elections took place during the First Party System, following the Democratic-Republicans' capture of the presidency and both chambers of Congress in the elections of 1800. Democratic-Republicans substantially increased their majorities in both chambers, winning 103 of the 142 seats in the House of Representatives and 25 of the 34 seats in the Senate.

== Background ==
Jefferson took office in March 1801 following a bitterly contested election that marked the first peaceful transfer of the presidency between political parties in the United States. The Democratic-Republicans entered the 7th Congress with majorities in both chambers, holding 68 of the 106 seats in the House and 17 of the 32 seats in the Senate.also won control of both chambers of Congress, displacing the Federalist majorities that had governed during the administration of President John Adams.

The elections were also the first conducted following congressional reapportionment based on the 1800 census. Under legislation enacted in January 1802, the size of the House increased from 106 to 142 seats while retaining a ratio of one representative for every 33,000 residents.

A major source of partisan conflict during Jefferson's first two years in office concerned the federal judiciary. Shortly before leaving power, the Federalist-controlled 6th Congress enacted the Judiciary Act of 1801, which reorganized the federal court system and created 16 circuit judgeships subsequently filled by Adams. Democratic-Republicans regarded the appointments as an attempt to preserve Federalist influence after the party's electoral defeat. In March 1802, the Democratic-Republican-controlled 7th Congress repealed the act, eliminating the new courts and judgeships and restoring the previous organization of the federal judiciary.

== Results ==
=== House of Representatives ===
All 142 voting seats in the House were contested, an increase of 36 seats from the preceding Congress due to reapportionment following the 1800 census. Democratic-Republicans won 103 seats, compared with 68 in the 7th Congress, while the Federalists increased from 38 to 39 seats. Democratic-Republicans therefore held more than two-thirds of the seats in the chamber. Democratic-Republican Representative Nathaniel Macon of North Carolina was reelected speaker of the House.

=== Senate ===
Eleven of the Senate's 34 seats were scheduled for regular election. Democratic-Republicans made a net gain of five seats in the regularly scheduled elections and entered the 8th Congress with 25 seats, while the Federalists held nine. This expanded the narrow Democratic-Republican majority in the preceding Congress into a commanding majority.

== See also ==
- 1802–03 United States House of Representatives elections
- 1802–03 United States Senate elections
