= Narsworthy Hunter =

American politician (c. 1756–1802)

Delegate to the U.S. House of Representatives from the Mississippi Territory's at-large district
- In office December 7, 1801 – March 11, 1802
- Preceded by: Constituency established
- Succeeded by: Thomas M. Green Jr.

Personal details
- Born: c.1756 Virginia, British America
- Died: March 11, 1802 (aged 45) Washington, D.C., U.S.
- Party: Democratic-Republican

Narsworthy Hunter (c. 1756 – March 11, 1802) was a delegate to the U.S. Congress from the Mississippi Territory and that state's first representative to Congress.

Hunter was born in Virginia at an unknown birth date, though at the time of his death he was estimated to be about 45 years old. He relocated as a young adult to Mississippi. In 1795, he was granted 1000 acres on Cole's Creek by the Spanish government in the Natchez District. He became a captain in the local militia, formed in 1793, and presented a petition to Andrew Ellicott from citizens asking the United States to intervene in their interests. Ellicott sent him to Philadelphia to deliver a message to the Secretary of State and Hunter returned with a commission of inspector of military posts east of the Mississippi. In 1798, Governor Sargent promoted Hunter to Major in the militia, and offered him the office of Major of Horse, but due to his opposition of the Governor, Hunter declined. In 1799 he was sent to the Capitol in Philadelphia by a committee, the Committee of 1799, opposed to Governor Sargent and succeeded in getting Congress to allow Mississippi to create a general assembly and an elect a delegate. Once the general assembly was formed in 1801, Hunter was elected by the assembly as the territory's delegate to the Seventh Congress. According to a thesis on libel law in Mississippi, "Mississippi’s first territorial delegate to the U.S. Congress, Narsworthy Hunter, had been a lobbyist in Washington. His other activities had included secretly presenting Cato West's first petition to Claiborne in Congress, inflating population figures, and telling other members of Congress that the citizens of the territory could govern themselves."

He traveled to the new Capitol in Washington, where he served for a little more than three months (December 7, 1801 – March 11, 1802) before dying suddenly. He was the first member of Congress to die in office after the Capitol moved to Washington, D.C.

He died in his boarding house in the Six Buildings in Washington, D.C., and was buried "the Yard by Mrs. Balch's Meeting House" in Georgetown. He was later moved to Presbyterian Cemetery in Georgetown, which opened a few months later, and then was reinterred at Congressional Cemetery in the 1890s when Presbyterian was developed.

== See also ==
- Henry Hunter (Mississippi politician), his relative
- Mississippi Territory
- 7th United States Congress
- United States House of Representatives
- List of members of the United States Congress who died in office (1790–1899)

U.S. House of Representatives
New constituency	Delegate to the U.S. House of Representatives from the Mississippi Territory's at-large congressional district 1801–1802	Succeeded by Thomas M. Green Jr.
