= Samuel Hunt (New Hampshire politician) =

American politician (1765–1807)

Member of the U.S. House of Representatives from New Hampshire's at-large district (seat B)
- In office December 6, 1802 – March 3, 1805
- Preceded by: Joseph Peirce
- Succeeded by: Thomas W. Thompson

Personal details
- Born: July 8, 1765 Charlestown, New Hampshire
- Died: July 7, 1807 (aged 41) Gallipolis, Ohio, U.S.

Samuel Hunt (July 8, 1765 – July 7, 1807) was a U.S. representative from New Hampshire.

Born in Charlestown, New Hampshire, Hunt completed preparatory studies, then studied law and was admitted to the bar in 1790, commencing practice in Alstead. He moved to Keene the same year and in 1795 abandoned the practice of law. He returned to Charlestown and engaged in agricultural pursuits. He served as member of the New Hampshire House of Representatives in 1802 and 1803.

Hunt was elected as a Federalist to the Seventh Congress to fill the vacancy caused by the resignation of Joseph Peirce. He was reelected to the Eighth Congress and served from December 6, 1802, to March 3, 1805. He was an unsuccessful candidate for renomination in 1804.

Subsequently, Hunt founded a colony in Ohio. He died in Gallipolis, July 7, 1807, and was interred in Mound Cemetery, Marietta, Ohio.

U.S. House of Representatives
Preceded by Joseph Peirce	Member of the U.S. House of Representatives from New Hampshire's at-large congressional district 1802–1805	Succeeded by Thomas W. Thompson
