= 1802 North Carolina's 8th congressional district special election =

A special election was held in North Carolina's 8th congressional district on October 15, 1802, to fill a vacancy left by the death of Charles Johnson (DR) on July 23, 1802.

== Election results ==
Candidate	Party	Votes	Percent
Thomas Wynns	Democratic-Republican	803	57.7%
Thomas Johnston	Democratic-Republican	349	25.1%
Lemuel Sawyer	Democratic-Republican	239	17.2%

Wynns took his seat on December 7, 1802.

== See also ==
- List of special elections to the United States House of Representatives
