= Joseph Peirce =

American politician

Joseph Peirce (June 25, 1748 – September 12, 1812) was a United States representative from New Hampshire.

Peirce was a member of the New Hampshire House of Representatives in 1788, 1789, 1792–1795, 1800, and 1801. He also served as Portsmouth town clerk 1789–1794. He was elected as a Federalist to the Seventh Congress and served from March 4, 1801, until his resignation in 1802. After leaving Congress, he engaged in agricultural pursuits. He died in Alton, New Hampshire on September 12, 1812.

U.S. House of Representatives
Preceded by Jonathan Freeman	Member of the U.S. House of Representatives from New Hampshire's at-large congressional district 1801–1802	Succeeded by Samuel Hunt
