= 1802 Maryland's 2nd congressional district special election =

A special election was held in Maryland's 2nd congressional district on March 2, 1802, to fill a vacancy left by the resignation of Richard Sprigg, Jr. (DR) on December 11, 1801.

== Election results ==
Candidate	Party	Votes	Percent
Walter Bowie	Democratic-Republican	413	100%

Bowie took office on March 24, 1802

== See also ==
- List of special elections to the United States House of Representatives
