= Phineas Bruce =

American politician

Hon. Phineas Bruce, 8th U.S. Congress

Member of the U.S. House of Representatives from Massachusetts's 17th district
- In office March 4, 1803 – 1804?
- Preceded by: None
- Succeeded by: John Chandler

Member of the Massachusetts House of Representatives
- In office 1800; 1791-1798

Personal details
- Born: June 7, 1762 Mendon, Province of Massachusetts Bay, British America
- Died: October 4, 1809 (aged 47) Uxbridge, Massachusetts, U.S.
- Resting place: Prospect Hill Cemetery, Uxbridge
- Party: Federalist
- Education: Yale University
- Profession: Lawyer

Hon. Phineas Bruce (June 7, 1762 – October 4, 1809) was a U.S. representative from Massachusetts who was unable to serve in the U.S. Congress due to his declining health.

== Biography ==
Prospect Hill Cemetery, burial place for Hon. Phineas Bruce.

Phineas Bruce was born in Mendon in the Province of Massachusetts Bay on June 7, 1762. He received a classical education and was graduated from Yale College in 1786. He studied law.

He was admitted to the bar in 1790 and commenced practice in Machias, Maine (then a district of Massachusetts). He served as member of the Massachusetts House of Representatives 1791-1798 and in 1800.

Bruce was elected as a Federalist to the Eighth Congress commencing March 4, 1803 – 1805, but was prevented by illness from qualifying. He died in Uxbridge, Massachusetts, October 4, 1809 and was interred in the Old Burying Ground and later reinterred in Prospect Hill Cemetery.

== Sources ==
- United States Congress. "Phineas Bruce (id: B000970)". Biographical Directory of the United States Congress.
