= 1802 North Carolina gubernatorial election =

- November 20, 1802
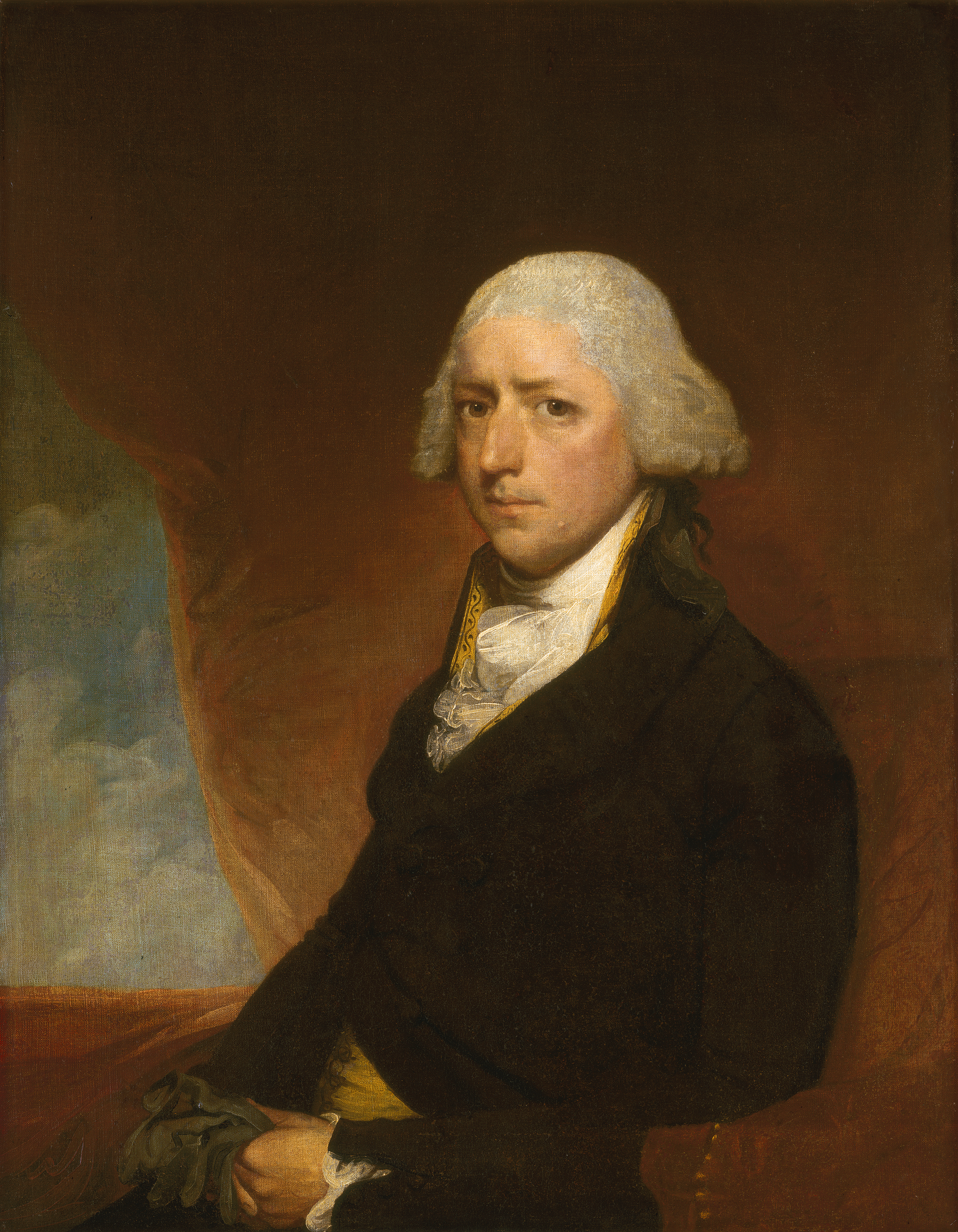

Nominee	John Baptista Ashe	William Polk	Joseph Taylor
Party	Democratic-Republican	Federalist	Democratic-Republican
Popular vote	103	49	19
Percentage	60.23%	28.66%	11.11%
Governor before election
Benjamin Williams
Federalist
Elected Governor
John Baptista Ashe
Democratic-Republican

The 1802 North Carolina gubernatorial election was held on November 20, 1802, in order to elect the Governor of North Carolina. Democratic-Republican candidate and former member of the U.S. House of Representatives from North Carolina's 3rd district John Baptista Ashe was elected by the North Carolina General Assembly against Federalist candidate and former member of the North Carolina House of Representatives William Polk and Democratic-Republican candidate Joseph Taylor.

== General election ==
On election day, November 20, 1802, Democratic-Republican candidate John Baptista Ashe was elected by the North Carolina General Assembly by a margin of 54 votes against his foremost opponent Federalist candidate William Polk, thereby gaining Democratic-Republican control over the office of Governor. Ashe was set to be sworn in as the 12th Governor of North Carolina on December 6, 1802, but died on November 27, 1802, resulting in a special election to be held on December 4 in order to replace him.

=== Results ===
North Carolina gubernatorial election, 1802
Party	Candidate	Votes	%
Democratic-Republican	John Baptista Ashe	103	60.23
Federalist	William Polk	49	28.66
Democratic-Republican	Joseph Taylor	19	11.11
Total votes		171	100.00
Democratic-Republican gain from Federalist			
