= Elias Perkins =

American politician (1767–1845)

Elias Perkins (April 5, 1767 – September 27, 1845) was a United States representative from Connecticut. He was born in Lisbon, Connecticut. He graduated from Yale College in 1786. Afterwards, he studied law and was admitted to the bar and commenced practice in New London, Connecticut.

Perkins was a member of the Connecticut House of Representatives 1795–1800, 1814, and 1815 and served as speaker in 1798 and 1815. He was an assistant judge of the New London County Court in 1799 and chief justice of the same court 1807–1825. He was elected as a Federalist to the Seventh Congress (March 4, 1801 -March 3, 1803). He resumed the practice of law and was a member of the Connecticut Senate 1817–1822. He was the mayor of New London from 1829 to 1832. He died in New London, on September 27, 1845, and was buried in Cedar Grove Cemetery.

U.S. House of Representatives
Preceded by Chauncey Goodrich	Member of the U.S. House of Representatives from Connecticut's at-large congressional district 1801-1803	Succeeded by Simeon Baldwin
