= Benjamin Taliaferro =

American politician

Member of the U.S. House of Representatives from Georgia's at-large district
- In office March 4, 1799 – 1802
- Preceded by: Abraham Baldwin
- Succeeded by: David Meriwether

Personal details
- Born: 1750 Amherst County, Virginia, Virginia Colony, British America
- Died: September 3, 1821 (aged 70–71) Wilkes County, Georgia, Georgia, U.S.
- Party: Democratic-Republican Party
- Children: 9

Military service
- Allegiance: United States
- Branch/service: Continental Army; Georgia Militia 3rd Division
- Rank: Captain; Major General
- Commands: 3rd Georgia Division
- Battles/wars: Princeton

Benjamin Taliaferro (/ˈtɒlɪvər/ TOL-iv-ər; 1750 – September 3, 1821) was an American politician who was a United States representative from Georgia. He had served in the American Revolutionary War, becoming a captain. An attorney, he was later appointed as a judge of the county court and the Georgia Superior Court. He also served in the Georgia Senate and as a delegate to the state's constitutional convention of 1798.

== Biography ==
Taliaferro was born in present-day Amherst County, Virginia, in 1750 to an Anglo-Italian family, the Taliaferros, who had settled in Virginia in the early 17th century from London. Having completed preparatory studies, Taliaferro served in the American Revolutionary War as a lieutenant in the rifle corps commanded by General Daniel Morgan. He was promoted to captain, participated in the Battle of Princeton, volunteered to serve in Lee's Legion, and was captured by the British at Charleston in 1780.

In 1782, Benjamin Taliaferro married Martha Meriwether in Virginia. The couple had nine children together. After his wife died, Benjamin married again, and had his tenth child with his second wife.

After the Revolutionary War ended, Taliaferro was among the pioneers who settled in Wilkes County, Georgia (1784). He was appointed a judge of the superior court. He established a successful tobacco plantation along the Broad River, becoming one of the largest slave holders in Wilkes County. He was elected to the Georgia General Assembly beginning in 1786. In the 1790s, he played an important role in resisting the state government's Yazoo land scandal. He engaged in at least one duel to defend his honor.

In 1795 Governor George Mathews appointed Taliaferro as major general of the Georgia Militia 3rd Division. He was elected to the Georgia Senate, after the state reorganized its government in 1789, and he served as senate president there from 1792 to 1796. He was a delegate to the Georgia state constitutional convention in 1798.

He was elected as a Federalist to the 6th United States Congress and then re-elected as a Republican to the 7th Congress, where he served from March 4, 1799, until his resignation in 1802.

He was later appointed as a judge of the Georgia Superior Court and a trustee for the University of Georgia. He died in Wilkes County on September 3, 1821.

== Honors ==
Taliaferro County, Georgia was named in his honor.

== Footnotes ==
U.S. House of Representatives
Preceded by John Milledge	Member of the U.S. House of Representatives from Georgia's at-large congressional district March 4, 1799 – 1802	Succeeded by David Meriwether
