= 1802 South Carolina's 4th congressional district special election =

A special election was held in South Carolina's 4th congressional district on April 12–13, 1802 to fill a vacancy resulting from the resignation of Thomas Sumter (DR) on December 15, 1801, upon being elected to the Senate.

== Election results ==
Candidate	Party	Votes	Percent
Richard Winn	Democratic-Republican	312	98.7%
John Kershaw	None	4	1.3%

Winn took his seat January 24, 1803

== See also ==
- List of special elections to the United States House of Representatives
