= December 1802 Georgia's at-large congressional district special election =

A special election was held in Georgia's at-large congressional district on December 15, 1802, to fill a vacancy caused by the resignation of John Milledge (DR), who had been elected Governor of Georgia. The winner would only finish the term ending March 3, 1803. A separate election would also be held in October 1803 to fill the seat for the next term. The election was won by Peter Early, a member of the Democratic-Republican Party.

== Election results ==
Candidate	Party	Votes	Percent
Peter Early	Democratic-Republican	2,401	69.11%
Joseph Bryan	Democratic-Republican	1,058	30.45%
Matthew MacAlister	Federalist	10	0.29%
Cowles Mead	Democratic-Republican	3	0.09%
Scattering	2		

== See also ==
- List of special elections to the United States House of Representatives
