= Silas Lee =

American politician

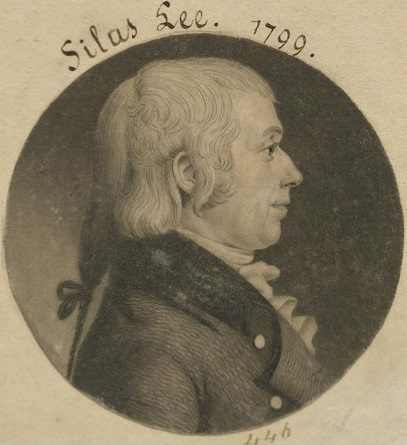

Member of the U.S. House of Representatives from Massachusetts's 12th district
- In office March 4, 1799 – August 20, 1801
- Preceded by: Isaac Parker
- Succeeded by: Samuel Thatcher

Personal details
- Born: July 3, 1760 Concord, Province of Massachusetts Bay, British America
- Died: March 1, 1814 (aged 53) Wiscasset, Massachusetts, U.S. (now Maine)
- Party: Federalist
- Education: Harvard University
- Occupation: Lawyer

Silas Lee (July 3, 1760 – March 1, 1814) was a lawyer, judge, and United States Representative from Massachusetts. Born in Concord in the Province of Massachusetts Bay, he pursued classical studies and graduated from Harvard University in 1784. He studied law, was admitted to the bar, and was a member of the Massachusetts House of Representatives in 1793, 1797, and 1798.

Lee was elected as a Federalist to the 6th and 7th Congresses and served from March 4, 1799, until August 20, 1801, when he resigned. He was appointed by President Thomas Jefferson to be United States Attorney for the District of Maine on January 6, 1802, and served until his death; he was justice of the peace and of the quorum in 1803, and probate judge from 1805 to 1814. In 1810 he was chief judge of the Court of Common Pleas. He died in Wiscasset (at the time, a part of Massachusetts' District of Maine). His interment was in Evergreen Cemetery.

U.S. House of Representatives
Preceded by Isaac Parker	Member of the U.S. House of Representatives from Massachusetts's 12th congressional district (Maine district); March 4, 1799 – August 20, 1801	Succeeded by Samuel Thatcher
