= Charles Johnson (North Carolina politician) =

American politician

Member of the U.S. House of Representatives from North Carolina's 8th district
- In office December 7, 1801 – July 23, 1802
- Preceded by: David Stone
- Succeeded by: Thomas Wynns

Personal details
- Born: Scotland
- Died: July 23, 1802 Bandon, near Edenton, North Carolina, United States
- Party: Democratic-Republican Party

Charles Johnson (died July 23, 1802) was a U.S. representative from North Carolina. Johnson was born in Scotland; engaged as a planter; elected to the Continental Congress in 1781, 1784, and 1785, but did not attend; served in the state senate in 1781–1784, 1788–1790, and 1792 (and as Speaker in 1789 after the death of Richard Caswell); elected as a Republican in a special election to the Seventh Congress (serving from March 4, 1801, until his death on July 23, 1802, in Bandon, near Edenton, North Carolina); interment in Edenton Cemetery.

== Biography ==
Johnson served in the North Carolina Senate representing Chowan County, North Carolina, from 1781 to 1784 and from 1788 to 1792. He was a candidate for the 4th congressional district in 1791, losing to incumbent Hugh Williamson, but was later elected to Congress from the 8th district in 1800, in which his one term was cut short by his death.

Johnson built the original section of the Strawberry Hill plantation home.

Johnson was a relative of Samuel Johnston and James Iredell Jr., both of whom served as U.S. senators and governors of North Carolina.

== See also ==
- Seventh United States Congress
- List of members of the United States Congress who died in office (1790–1899)

U.S. House of Representatives
Preceded by David Stone	United States Representative in Congress from North Carolina's 8th congressional district 1801–1802	Succeeded by Thomas Wynns
