= Thomas Wynns =

American politician

Thomas Wynns (1764 – June 3, 1825) was an American United States Congressman from Hertford County, North Carolina. He was an original member of the University of North Carolina at Chapel Hill Board of Trustees. He is interred near Winton, North Carolina, which is named for his father Benjamin.

Wynns owned slaves.

== See also ==
- Seventh United States Congress
- Eighth United States Congress
- Ninth United States Congress

U.S. House of Representatives
Preceded by Charles Johnson	Member of the U.S. House of Representatives from North Carolina's 8th congressional district 1802–1803	Succeeded by Richard Stanford
Preceded by James Holland	Member of the U.S. House of Representatives from North Carolina's 1st congressional district 1803–1807	Succeeded by Lemuel Sawyer
