= Samuel Thatcher =

American politician (1776–1872)

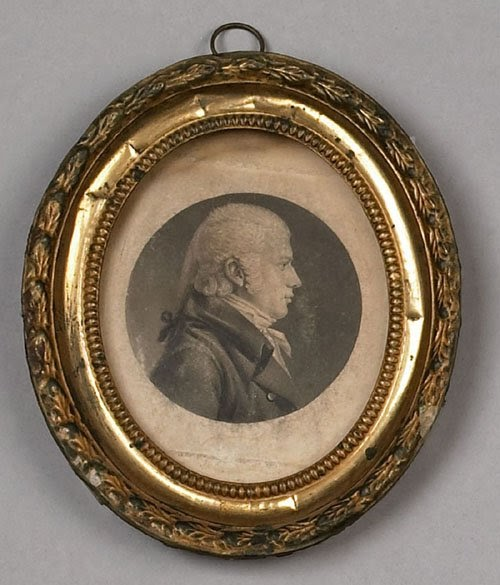

Member of the U.S. House of Representatives from Massachusetts
- In office December 6, 1802 – March 3, 1805
- Preceded by: Silas Lee
- Succeeded by: Orchard Cook
- Constituency: 12th district (1802–1803); 16th district (1803–1805)

Member of the Massachusetts House of Representatives
- In office 1801-1811

Personal details
- Born: July 1, 1776 Cambridge, Province of Massachusetts Bay, British America
- Died: July 18, 1872 (aged 96) Bangor, Maine, U.S.
- Education: Harvard College
- Profession: lawyer

Samuel Thatcher (July 1, 1776 – July 18, 1872) was a member of the United States House of Representatives from Massachusetts.

He was born in Cambridge in the Province of Massachusetts Bay on July 1, 1776; was graduated from Harvard University in 1793; studied law; was admitted to the bar in 1797 and commenced practice in New Gloucester (then in Massachusetts' District of Maine); moved to Warren in 1800; member of the Massachusetts house of representatives 1801–1811; was elected as a Federalist to the Seventh Congress to fill the vacancy caused by the resignation of Silas Lee; reelected to the Eighth Congress and served from December 6, 1802, to March 3, 1805; sheriff of Lincoln County, 1814–1821; member of the Maine house of representatives in 1824; moved to Bangor, Maine, in 1860, and died there July 18, 1872; interment in Bangor's Mount Hope Cemetery.

U.S. House of Representatives
Preceded by Silas Lee	Member of the U.S. House of Representatives from Massachusetts's 12th congressional district (Maine district); December 6, 1802 – March 3, 1805	Succeeded by Thomson Skinner
