= 1805 United States gubernatorial elections =

- March 12, 1805 – December 7, 1805

13 state governorships
	Majority party	Minority party	Third party
Party	Democratic-Republican	Federalist	Independent
Last election	12 governorships	5 governorships	0 governorships
Seats before	12	5	0
Seats won	9	3	1
Seats after	12	4	1
Seat change	Steady	▼1	▲1
Seats up	9	4	0
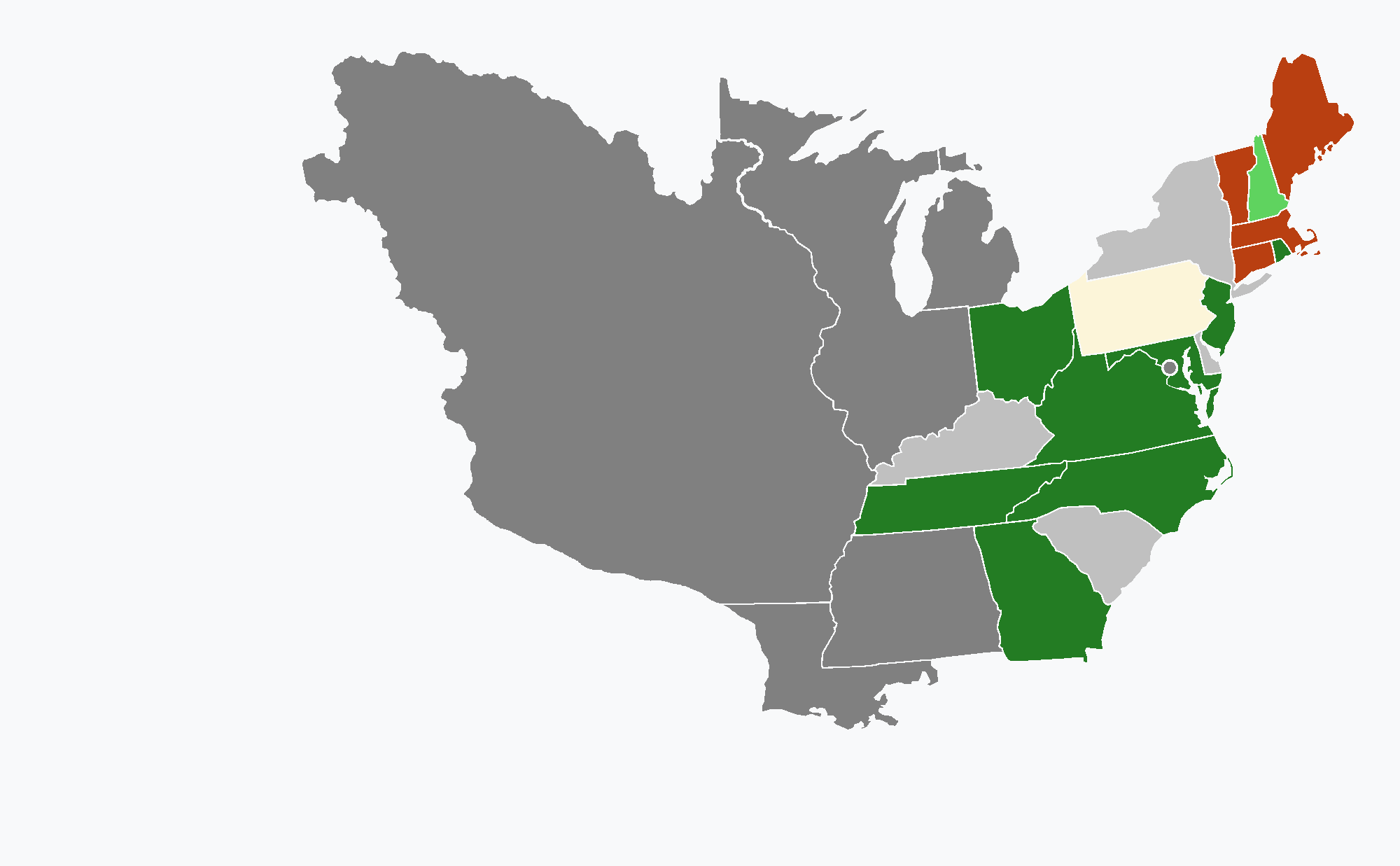
- Democratic-Republican gain Democratic-Republican hold Federalist gain Federalist hold Independent gain

United States gubernatorial elections were held in 1805, in 13 states.

Eight governors were elected by popular vote and five were elected by state legislatures.

== Results ==
State	Election date	Incumbent	Party	Status	Opposing candidates
Connecticut	11 April 1805 (Note: Glashan records this election as taking place on 8 April.)	Jonathan Trumbull Jr.	Federalist	Re-elected, 12,700 (61.47%) (Note: Some sources record the result as Trumbull 13,689, Hart 8,223; this includes 989 votes for Trumbull and 413 for Hart from six towns rejected by the General Assembly.)	William Hart (Democratic-Republican), 7,810 (37.80%); Scattering 151 (0.73%)
Georgia (election by legislature)	7 November 1805? (Note: Two contemporary newspapers quote a letter dated November 4 which states the election took place the previous Thursday, which would place the election on October 31. However, another newspaper states that the legislature did not meet until 5 November, which would suggest a date a week later. An election in the first week of November would be in line with other gubernatorial elections in Georgia in the 1800s.)	John Milledge	Democratic-Republican	Re-elected, 61 votes	
Maryland (election by legislature)	11 November 1805	Robert Bowie	Democratic-Republican	Re-elected, unknown number of votes	
Massachusetts	1 April 1805	Caleb Strong	Federalist	Re-elected, 32,988 (51.45%) (Note: Many sources give the result as Strong 35,204, Sullivan 33,518, Scattering 264, but these are the results given before the canvass of votes by the state legislature which rejected the votes of 62 towns. Glashan gives Sullivan's total as 33,543, and scattering votes as 239. This discrepancy depends on the allocation of 25 votes given for "James Solvan.")	James Sullivan (Democratic-Republican), 31,125 (48.55%) (Note: Includes scattering votes.)
New Hampshire	12 March 1805	John Taylor Gilman	Federalist	Defeated, 12,287 (43.20%)	John Langdon (Democratic-Republican), 16,097 (56.59%); Scattering 59 (0.21%)
New Jersey (election by legislature)	25 October 1805	Joseph Bloomfield	Democratic-Republican	Re-elected, unanimously	
North Carolina (election by legislature)	25 November 1805	James Turner	Democratic-Republican	Term-limited, Democratic-Republican victory	Nathaniel Alexander (Democratic-Republican), 108 votes Benjamin Williams (Federalist), 66 votes (Note: Some sources give Williams' total as 65. The result given here is that given in the North Carolina Legislative Papers.); Joseph Taylor (Democratic-Republican), 3 votes Little, 1 vote More, 1 vote Whitfield, 1 vote
Ohio	8 October 1805	Edward Tiffin	Democratic-Republican	Re-elected, 4,783 (100.00%) (Note: Most sources agree on this result, and one source states that this is the result declared in the General Assembly. This result can be achieved by taking the results from Belmont, Butler, Columbiana, Fairfield, Franklin, Highland, and Ross, Greene, Jefferson, Scioto, Warren, and Washington, Gallia, and Muskingum counties only. A New Nation Votes includes returns from Adams, Athens, Clermont, Hamilton, and Montgomery counties, and records the result as Tiffin 6,321, Nathaniel Massie 171, Scattering 27. It is further recorded that Tiffin received 379 votes in Trumbull County.) (Note: Some sources give Tiffin's total as 4,788, which is the sum of the county breakdown for the counties included in the official total.)	
Pennsylvania	8 October 1805	Thomas McKean	Democratic-Republican	Re-elected as an Independent Republican, 43,644 (52.89%)	Simon Snyder (Democratic-Republican), 38,483 (46.63%) (Note: Some sources give Snyder's total as 38,833. This discrepancy appears to come from the transposition of the last two digits of Snyder's total, plus the scattering votes. 38,483 is the figure given in the Pennsylvania Senate Journal.); Scattering 395 (0.48%) (Note: The scattering votes were cast for "Samuel Snyder" in Bucks County.)
Rhode Island	3 April 1805 (Note: Glashan records this election as taking place on 17 April.)	Arthur Fenner	Democratic-Republican/Country	Re-elected. Returns lost.	Seth Wheaton (Federalist)
Tennessee	1–2 August 1805	John Sevier	Democratic-Republican	Re-elected, 10,293 (63.74%) (Note: A New Nation Votes states that the result per the Tennessee Senate Journal was Sevier 10,393, Roane 5,909.)	Archibald Roane (Democratic-Republican), 5,855 (36.26%) (Note: Dubin and OurCampaigns give Roane's total as 5,795.)
Vermont	3 September 1805	Isaac Tichenor	Federalist	Re-elected, 8,683 (60.87%) (Note: Various sources give slightly different results for this election. The result given here is that described by A New Nation Votes as "the officially recorded votes".)	Jonathan Robinson (Democratic-Republican), 5,054 (35.43%); Scattering 527 (3.69%)
Virginia (election by legislature)	7 December 1805 (Note: Encyclopedia Virginia records this election as taking place on 6 December.)	John Page	Democratic-Republican	Term-limited, Democratic-Republican victory	William H. Cabell (Democratic-Republican), 99 votes Alexander MacRae, 90 votes

== See also ==
- 1805 United States elections

== Bibliography ==
- Glashan, Roy R. (1979). American Governors and Gubernatorial Elections, 1775-1978. Westport, CT: Meckler Books. ISBN 0-930466-17-9.
- Gubernatorial Elections, 1787-1997. Washington, D.C.: Congressional Quarterly Inc. 1998. ISBN 1-56802-396-0.
- Dubin, Michael J. (2003). United States Gubernatorial Elections, 1776-1860: The Official Results by State and County. Jefferson, North Carolina: McFarland. ISBN 978-0-7864-1439-0.
- Kallenbach, Joseph E.; Kallenbach, Jessamine S., eds. (1977). American State Governors, 1776-1976. Vol. I. Dobbs Ferry, N.Y.: Oceana Publications, Inc. ISBN 0-379-00665-0.
