= List of elections in 1805 =

The following elections were held in the year 1805.

== North America ==
=== United States ===
==== United States lieutenant gubernatorial ====
- 1805 Connecticut lieutenant gubernatorial election

==== United States gubernatorial ====
- 1805 Connecticut gubernatorial election
- 1805 Georgia gubernatorial election
- 1805 Maryland gubernatorial election
- 1805 Massachusetts gubernatorial election
- 1805 New Hampshire gubernatorial election
- 1805 New Jersey gubernatorial election
- 1805 North Carolina gubernatorial election
- 1805 Pennsylvania gubernatorial election
- 1805 Rhode Island gubernatorial election
- 1805 Tennessee gubernatorial election
- 1805 United States gubernatorial elections
- 1805 Vermont gubernatorial election
- 1805 Virginia gubernatorial election

==== United States Senate ====
- 1804 and 1805 United States Senate elections

==== United States House of Representatives ====
- 1804–05 United States House of Representatives elections
- 1805 Connecticut's at-large congressional district special election
- 1805 Delaware's at-large congressional district special election
- 1805 United States House of Representatives elections in Kentucky
- 1805 Maryland's 4th congressional district special election
- 1805 Massachusetts's 11th congressional district special election
- 1805 New York's 2nd congressional district special election
- 1805 New York's 3rd congressional district special election
- 1805 United States House of Representatives elections in North Carolina
- 1805 North Carolina's 5th congressional district special election
- 1805 North Carolina's 10th congressional district special election
- 1805 Pennsylvania's 4th congressional district special election
- 1805 Pennsylvania's 11th congressional district special election
- 1805 United States House of Representatives elections in Tennessee
- 1805 United States House of Representatives elections in Virginia
