= 1800 United States gubernatorial elections =

- March 11, 1800 – December 7, 1800

11 state governorships
	Majority party	Minority party
Party	Federalist	Democratic-Republican
Last election	10 governorships	6 governorships
Seats before	9	7 (Note: John Drayton (Democratic-Republican) succeeded South Carolina Governor Edward Rutledge (Federalist) who died in office in January 1800.)
Seats won	7	4
Seats after	9	7
Seat change	Steady	Steady
Seats up	7	4
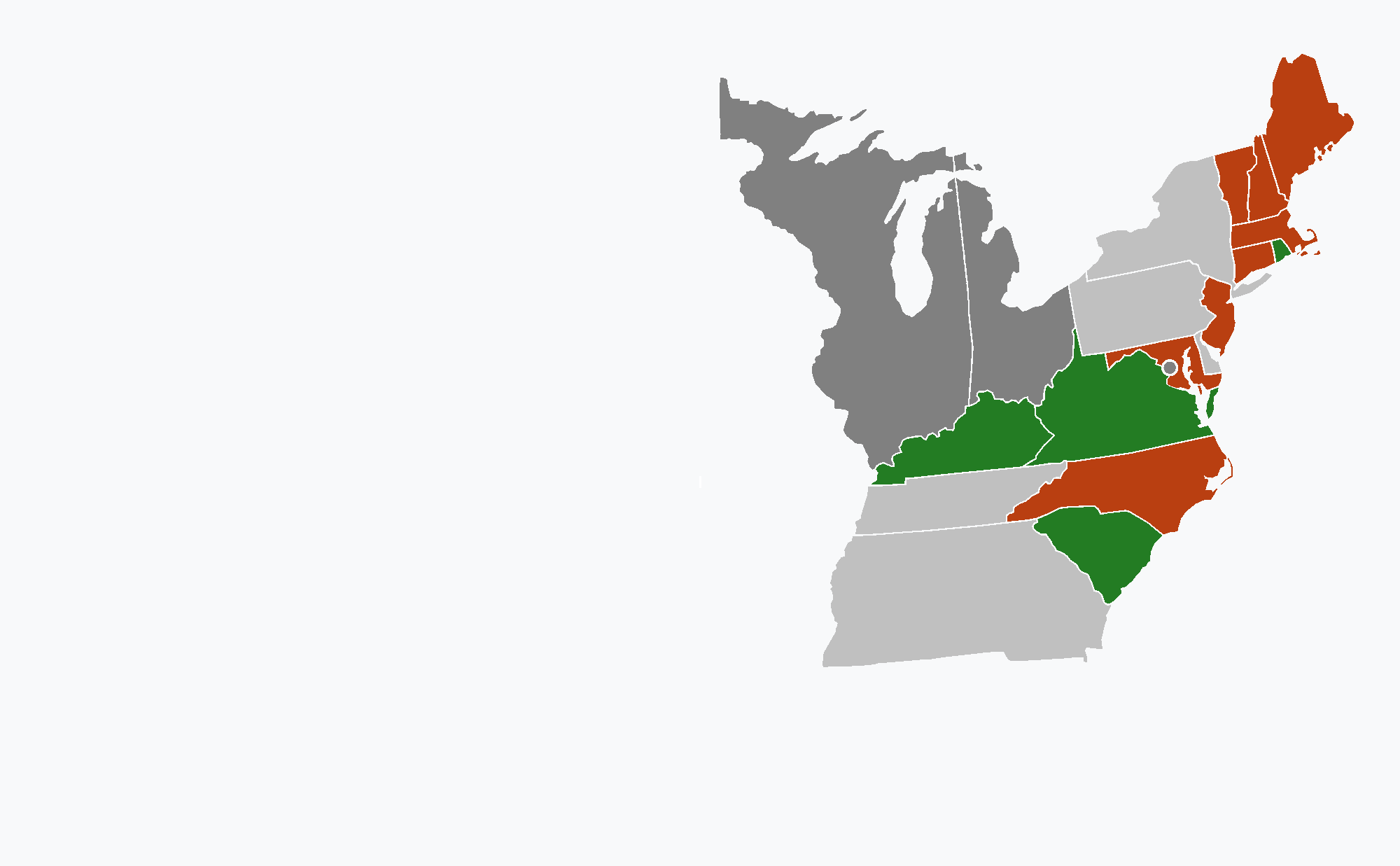
- Democratic-Republican gain Democratic-Republican hold Federalist gain Federalist hold

United States gubernatorial elections were held in 1800, in 11 states, concurrent with the House, Senate elections and presidential election.

Six governors were elected by popular vote and five were elected by state legislatures.

== Results ==
State	Election date	Incumbent	Party	Status	Opposing candidates
Connecticut	10 April 1800 (Note: Glashan records this election as taking place on 7 April.)	Jonathan Trumbull Jr.	Federalist	Re-elected, 5,544 (100.00%)	
Kentucky	6–8 August 1800 (Note: A New Nation Votes records this election as taking place on 5–7 August.)	James Garrard	Democratic-Republican	Re-elected, 8,390 (39.40%)	Christopher Greenup (Democratic-Republican), 6,745 (31.67%); Benjamin Logan (Democratic-Republican), 3,995 (18.76%); Thomas Todd (Democratic-Republican), 2,166 (10.17%)
Maryland (election by legislature)	10 November 1800	Benjamin Ogle	Federalist	Re-elected, unanimously	
Massachusetts	7 April 1800	Moses Gill (acting) (Note: As Lieutenant Governor, Gill became acting Governor on the death of Governor Increase Sumner on 7 June 1799.)	Federalist	Defeated, 2,019 (5.17%) (Note: Gill was re-elected Lieutenant Governor in an election held concurrently with the gubernatorial election.) (Note: Gill died in office on 20 May 1800. The Massachusetts Governor's Council headed by Thomas Dawes acted as Governor until Strong's inauguration on 30 May.)	Caleb Strong (Federalist), 19,630 (50.26%); Elbridge Gerry (Democratic-Republican), 17,019 (43.57%) (Note: Some sources give Gerry's total as 17,060, and scattering votes as 350. This discrepancy depends on the allocation of 41 votes given for "Elbridge Garry."); Scattering 391 (1.00%)
New Hampshire	11 March 1800	John Taylor Gilman	Federalist	Re-elected, 10,362 (61.82%)	Timothy Walker (Democratic-Republican), 6,039 (36.03%); Scattering 361 (2.15%)
New Jersey (election by legislature)	30 October 1800	Richard Howell	Federalist	Re-elected, unanimously	
North Carolina (election by legislature)	26 November 1800?	Benjamin Williams	Federalist (Note: Some sources describe Williams as a Democratic-Republican, although Broussard refers to him as "a quiet but unmistakeable Federalist" and "undeniably a Federalist", and Gilpatrick describes him as a "mild Federalist.")	Re-elected, 127 votes (Note: Some sources give Williams's total as 126.)	Joseph Taylor (Democratic-Republican), 26 votes (Note: Some contemporary sources give Taylor's total as 37.); John B. Ashe (Democratic-Republican) 17 votes
Rhode Island	2 April 1800 (Note: Glashan records this election as taking place on 16 April.)	Arthur Fenner	Democratic-Republican/Country	Re-elected. Returns lost.	
South Carolina (election by legislature)	4 December 1800 or 5 December 1800	John Drayton (acting) (Note: As Lieutenant Governor, Drayton became acting Governor on the death of Governor Edward Rutledge on 23 January 1800.)	Democratic-Republican	Re-elected, "majority of 18"	
Vermont	2 September 1800	Isaac Tichenor	Federalist	Re-elected, 6,444 (63.41%)	Israel Smith (Democratic-Republican), 3,339 (32.85%) (Note: Some sources give Smith's total as 3,239. This appears to be a calculation error made in contemporary sources which give county totals which add to 3,339. A New Nation Votes gives Smith's total as 3,360 on the basis of 21 votes not included in the county total for Windham County.); Scattering 380 (3.74%)
Virginia (election by legislature)	7 December 1800? (Note: This is highly unlikely to be the correct date as it was a Sunday. The legislature met on 1 December. Monroe acknowledged his election in a letter of 8 December.)	James Monroe	Democratic-Republican	Re-elected, "by a large majority"	

== See also ==
- 1800 United States elections
  - 1800 United States presidential election
  - 1800–01 United States Senate elections
  - 1800–01 United States House of Representatives elections

== Bibliography ==
- Glashan, Roy R. (1979). American Governors and Gubernatorial Elections, 1775-1978. Westport, CT: Meckler Books. ISBN 0-930466-17-9.
- Gubernatorial Elections, 1787-1997. Washington, D.C.: Congressional Quarterly Inc. 1998. ISBN 1-56802-396-0.
- Dubin, Michael J. (2003). United States Gubernatorial Elections, 1776-1860: The Official Results by State and County. Jefferson, North Carolina: McFarland. ISBN 978-0-7864-1439-0.
- Kallenbach, Joseph E.; Kallenbach, Jessamine S., eds. (1977). American State Governors, 1776-1976. Vol. I. Dobbs Ferry, N.Y.: Oceana Publications, Inc. ISBN 0-379-00665-0.
- Broussard, James H. (1978). The Southern Federalists, 1800-1816. Baton Rouge: Louisiana State University Press. ISBN 0-8071-0288-1.
