= 1807 North Carolina gubernatorial election =

- November 24, 1807
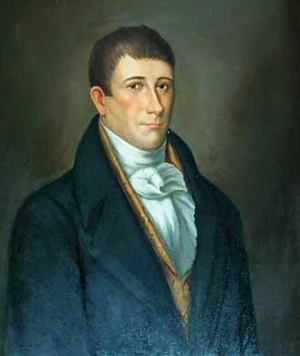

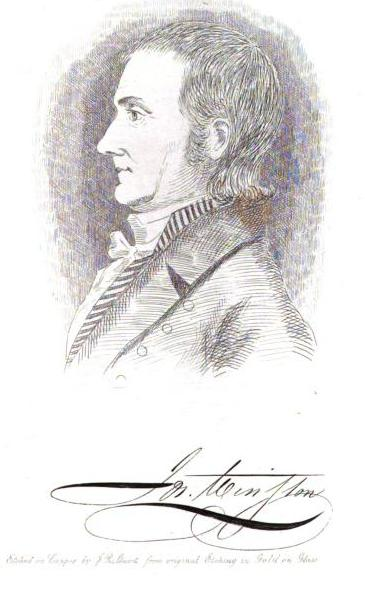
Nominee	Benjamin Williams	Nathaniel Alexander	Joseph Winston
Party	Federalist	Democratic-Republican	Democratic-Republican
Popular vote	89	62	15
Percentage	53.62%	37.35%	9.03%
Governor before election
Nathaniel Alexander
Democratic-Republican
Elected Governor
Benjamin Williams
Federalist

The 1807 North Carolina gubernatorial election was held on November 24, 1807, in order to elect the governor of North Carolina. Former Federalist Governor Benjamin Williams was elected by the North Carolina General Assembly against incumbent Democratic-Republican governor Nathaniel Alexander and Democratic-Republican candidate and former member of the U.S. House of Representatives from North Carolina's 12th district Joseph Winston.

== General election ==
On election day, November 24, 1807, former Federalist Governor Benjamin Williams was elected by the North Carolina General Assembly by a margin of 25 votes against his foremost opponent incumbent Democratic-Republican governor Nathaniel Alexander, thereby gaining Federalist control over the office of governor. Williams was sworn in for his fourth overall term on December 1, 1807.

=== Results ===
North Carolina gubernatorial election, 1807
Party	Candidate	Votes	%
Federalist	Benjamin Williams	89	53.62
Democratic-Republican	Nathaniel Alexander (incumbent)	62	37.35
Democratic-Republican	Joseph Winston	15	9.03
Total votes		166	100.00
Federalist gain from Democratic-Republican			
