= 1808 North Carolina gubernatorial election =

- December 1808
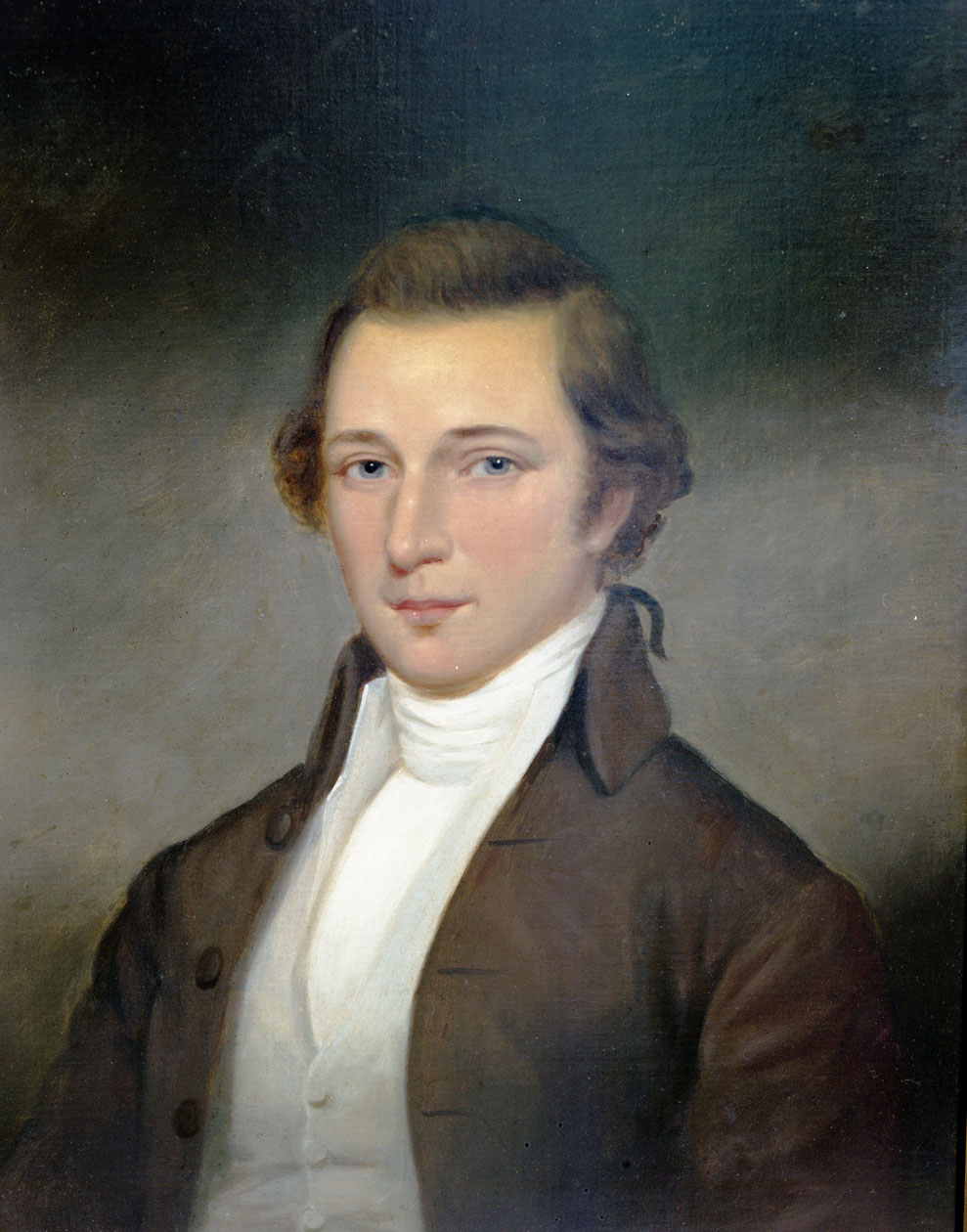

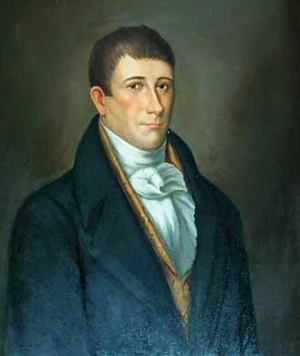
Nominee	David Stone	Benjamin Williams
Party	Democratic-Republican	Federalist
Popular vote	96	76
Percentage	55.81%	44.19%
Governor before election
Benjamin Williams
Federalist
Elected Governor
David Stone
Democratic-Republican

The 1808 North Carolina gubernatorial election was held in December 1808 in order to elect the Governor of North Carolina. Democratic-Republican candidate and former United States Senator from North Carolina David Stone was elected by the North Carolina General Assembly against incumbent Federalist Governor Benjamin Williams.

== General election ==
On election day in December 1808, Democratic-Republican candidate David Stone was elected by the North Carolina General Assembly by a margin of 20 votes against his opponent incumbent Federalist Governor Benjamin Williams, thereby gaining Democratic-Republican control over the office of Governor. Stone was sworn in as the 15th Governor of North Carolina on December 12, 1808.

=== Results ===
North Carolina gubernatorial election, 1808
Party	Candidate	Votes	%
Democratic-Republican	David Stone	96	55.81
Federalist	Benjamin Williams (incumbent)	76	44.19
Total votes		172	100.00
Democratic-Republican gain from Federalist			
