= 1800 North Carolina gubernatorial election =

- November 26, 1800
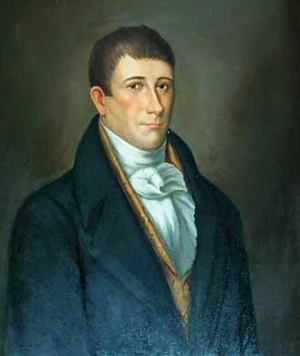

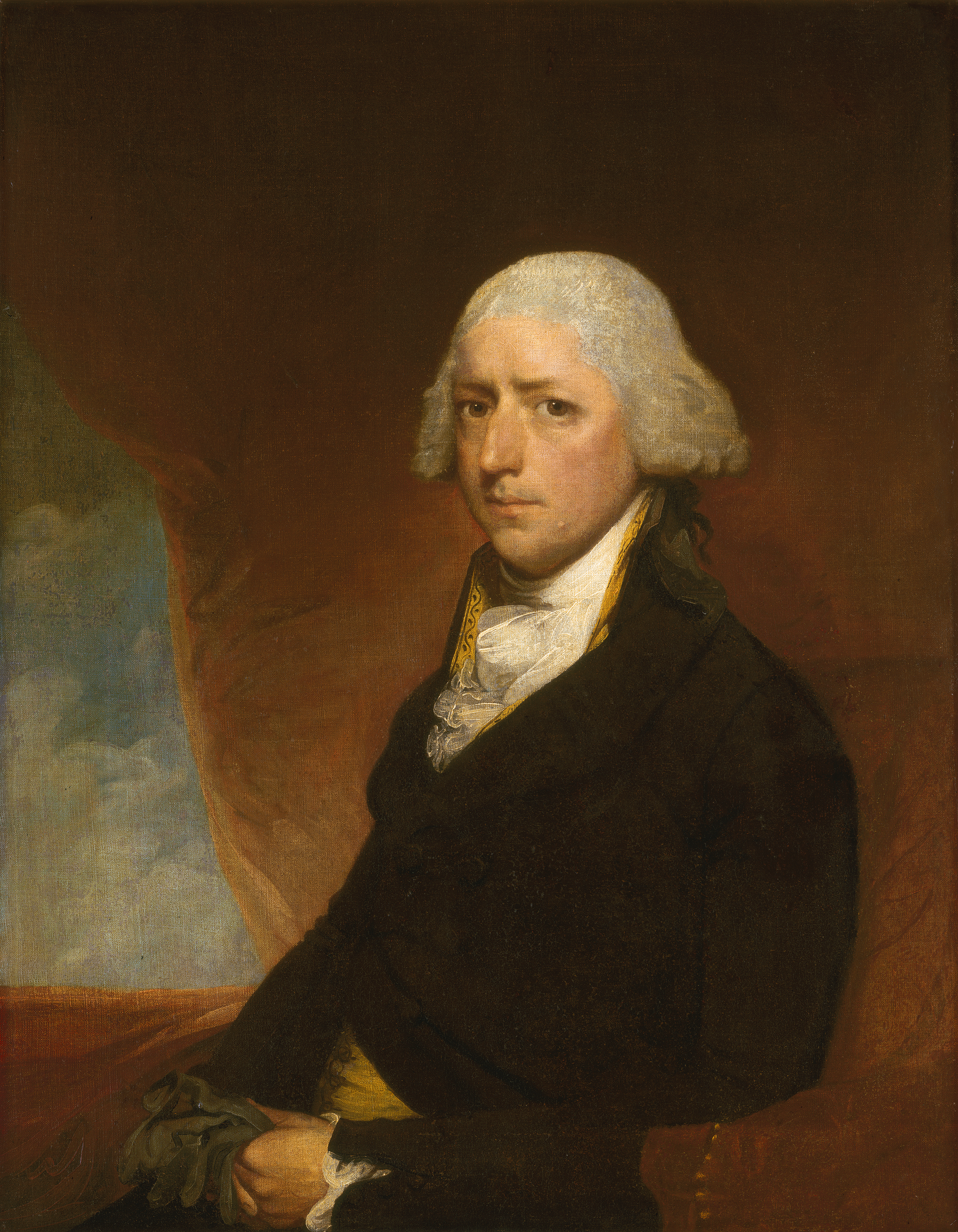
Nominee	Benjamin Williams	Joseph Taylor	John Baptista Ashe
Party	Federalist	Democratic-Republican	Democratic-Republican
Popular vote	127	26	17
Percentage	74.71%	15.29%	10.00%
Governor before election
Benjamin Williams
Federalist
Elected Governor
Benjamin Williams
Federalist

The 1800 North Carolina gubernatorial election was held on November 26, 1800, in order to elect the Governor of North Carolina. Incumbent Federalist Governor Benjamin Williams was re-elected by the North Carolina General Assembly against Democratic-Republican candidates Joseph Taylor and former member of the U.S. House of Representatives from North Carolina's 3rd district John Baptista Ashe.

== General election ==
On election day, November 26, 1800, incumbent Federalist Governor Benjamin Williams was re-elected by the North Carolina General Assembly by a margin of 101 votes against his foremost opponent Democratic-Republican candidate Joseph Taylor, thereby retaining Federalist control over the office of Governor. Williams was sworn in for his second term on November 29, 1800.

=== Results ===
North Carolina gubernatorial election, 1800
Party	Candidate	Votes	%
Federalist	Benjamin Williams (incumbent)	127	74.71
Democratic-Republican	Joseph Taylor	26	15.29
Democratic-Republican	John Baptista Ashe	17	10.00
Total votes		170	100.00
Federalist hold			
