= Jesse Franklin =

American politician (1760–1823)

20th Governor of North Carolina
- In office December 7, 1820 – December 7, 1821
- Preceded by: John Branch
- Succeeded by: Gabriel Holmes

President pro tempore of the United States Senate
- In office March 10, 1804 – November 4, 1804
- Preceded by: John Brown
- Succeeded by: Joseph Anderson

Member of the U.S. House of Representatives from North Carolina's 3rd district
- In office March 4, 1795 – March 3, 1797
- Preceded by: Joseph Winston
- Succeeded by: Robert Williams

United States Senator from North Carolina
- In office March 4, 1807 – March 3, 1813
- Preceded by: David Stone
- Succeeded by: David Stone
- In office March 4, 1799 – March 3, 1805
- Preceded by: Alexander Martin
- Succeeded by: James Turner

Member of the North Carolina House of Representatives
- In office 1793–1794; 1797–1798

Personal details
- Born: March 24, 1760 Orange County, Colony of Virginia, British America
- Died: August 31, 1823 (aged 63) Surry County, North Carolina, U.S.
- Party: Democratic-Republican

Jesse Franklin (March 24, 1760 – August 31, 1823) was the Democratic-Republican U.S. senator from the U.S. state of North Carolina between 1799 and 1805 and between 1807 and 1813. In 1804, Franklin briefly served as President pro tempore of the United States Senate. He later served as the 20th governor of North Carolina from 1820 to 1821. Franklin was the brother of Meshack Franklin, who also served in Congress.

== Early life ==
Jesse Franklin was born in Orange County in the Colony of Virginia on March 24, 1760. He was the son of Bernard and Mary Franklin, the third of seven sons.

Franklin moved to North Carolina with his father in 1774 and served as a major during the Revolutionary War. During the war he was captured by Tories, but escaped. Franklin was in the Battle of Kings Mountain and served as Adjutant of Colonel Benjamin Cleveland's battalion. (Cleveland was a relative of Franklin's.) He was also at the Battle of Guilford Court House. He performed further service in partisan warfare against Tories in North Carolina, service that continued to the end of the war.

In Greensboro there is a monument to Revolutionary War soldiers Joseph Winston, Jesse Franklin and Richard Taliaferro, the gift of Governor Thomas M. Holt.

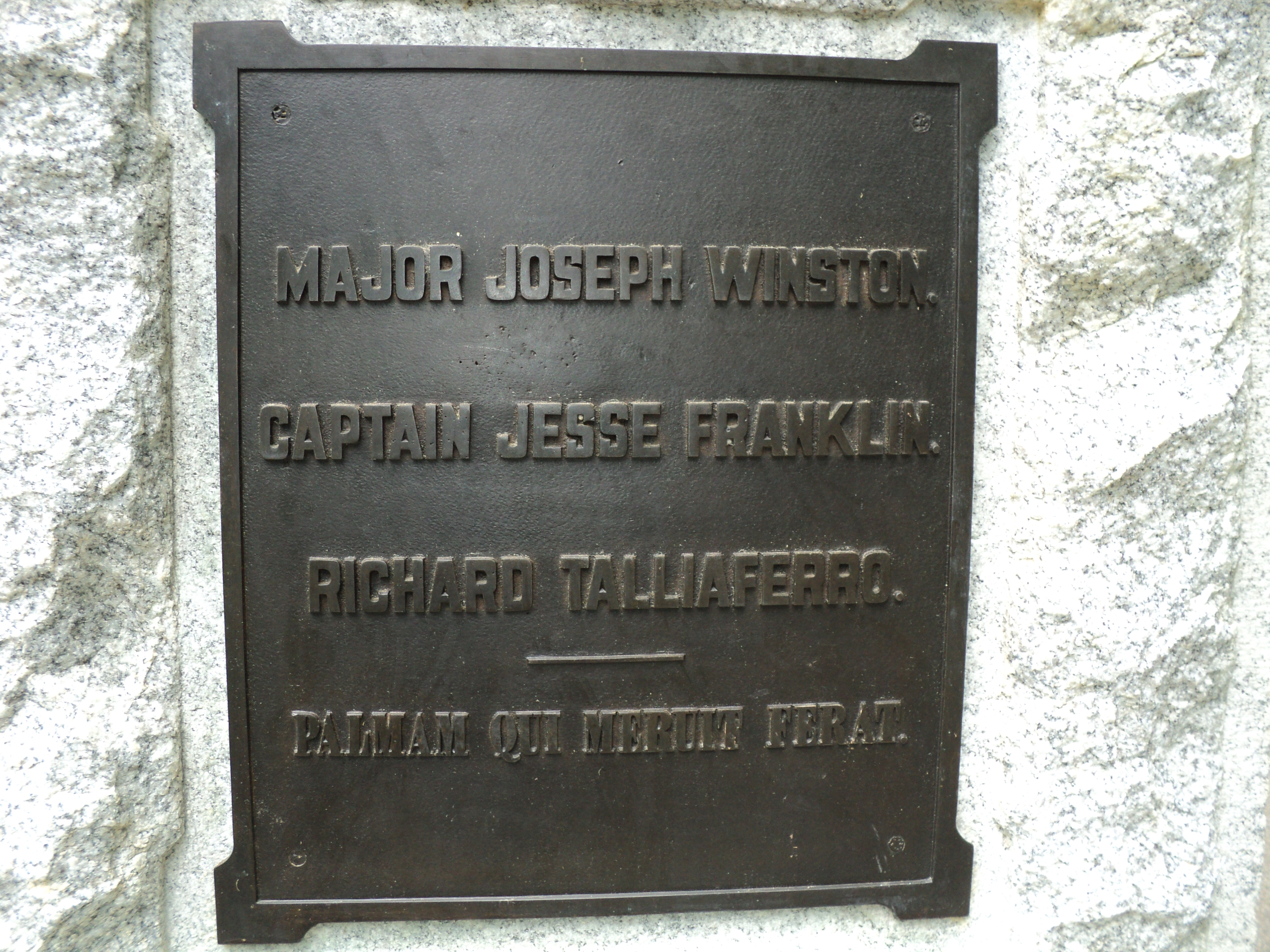
Plaque honoring Franklin at Guilford Courthouse

== Early political career and service in Congress ==
Franklin was a member of the state legislature in 1793–1794 and 1797–1798. He was elected to the Fourth Congress and served from March 4, 1795 to March 3, 1797. Franklin was then elected as a Democratic-Republican to the United States Senate and served from March 4, 1799 to March 3, 1805. Franklin was put up by the Legislature for re-election in December 1804, but Republicans at the time were divided in their support of him and Federalists did not think highly of him, and he was defeated.

Franklin served as President pro tempore of the Senate during the Eighth Congress. Franklin then served as a state senator in 1805–1806.

In 1806, he was again elected as a Democratic Republican to the United States Senate and served from March 4, 1807 until March 3, 1813. During his second period as a senator, Franklin was known as an advocate of Madison's war measures, and as an opponent of monopolies and central banks.

Franklin was appointed a commissioner to negotiate with the Chickasaw Indians near the site of present-day Memphis in 1817, an appointment he accepted at the request of General Andrew Jackson.

== Governor of North Carolina ==
Franklin was Governor of North Carolina from 1820 to 1821. During his term as governor, the Canova statue of George Washington was placed at the state Capitol in a new addition containing a rotunda that was considered an appropriate area for displaying it.

As governor, Franklin was considered to be conscientious and practical. He advocated reform in the treatment of criminals, including abolition of ear cropping.

== Death ==
Franklin died in Surry County, North Carolina on August 31, 1823. He was interred in Surry County. In 1906, his remains were moved to Guilford Courthouse National Military Park, near Greensboro.

U.S. House of Representatives
Preceded by Joseph Winston	U.S. Representative (District 3) from North Carolina; 1795–1797	Succeeded by Robert Williams
Political offices
Preceded by John Branch	Governor of North Carolina; 1820–1821	Succeeded by Gabriel Holmes
U.S. Senate
Preceded by Alexander Martin	U.S. senator (Class 2) from North Carolina; 1799–1805; Served alongside: Timothy Bloodworth, David Stone	Succeeded by James Turner
Preceded by David Stone	U.S. senator (Class 3) from North Carolina; 1807–1813; Served alongside: James Turner	Succeeded by David Stone
Honorary titles
Preceded by John Brown	President pro tempore of the United States Senate; March 10, 1804 – November 4, 1804	Succeeded by Joseph Anderson
