= 1792 North Carolina gubernatorial election =

- December 11, 1792
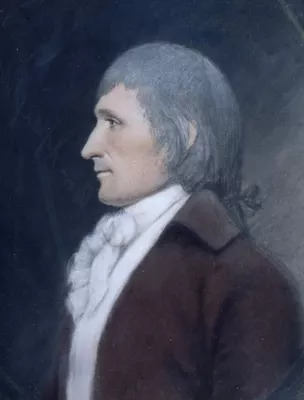

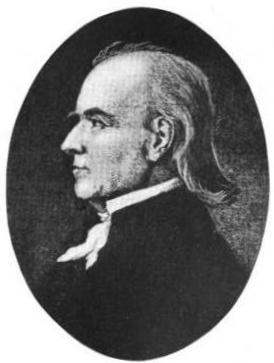

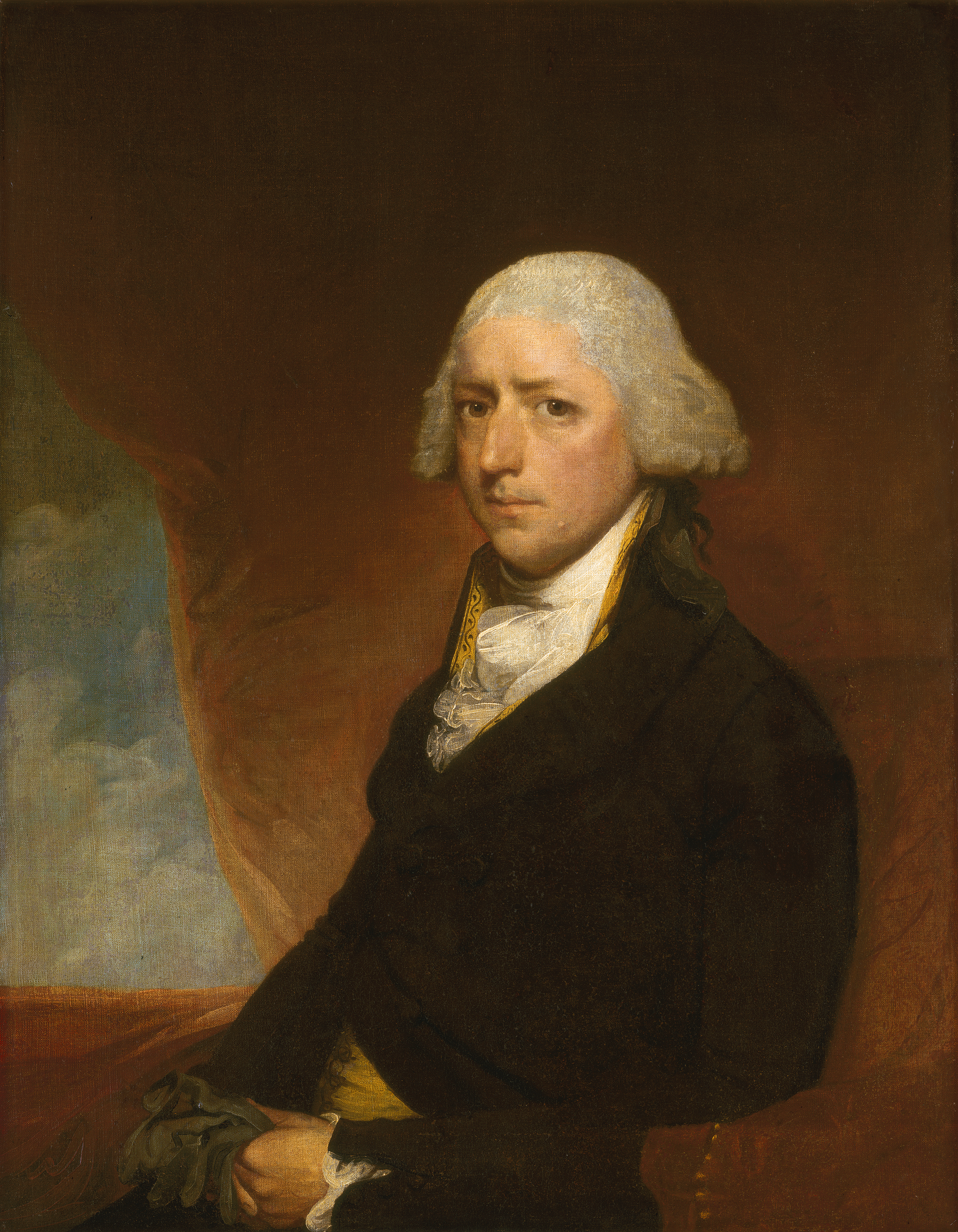

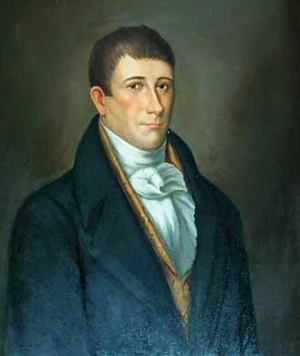

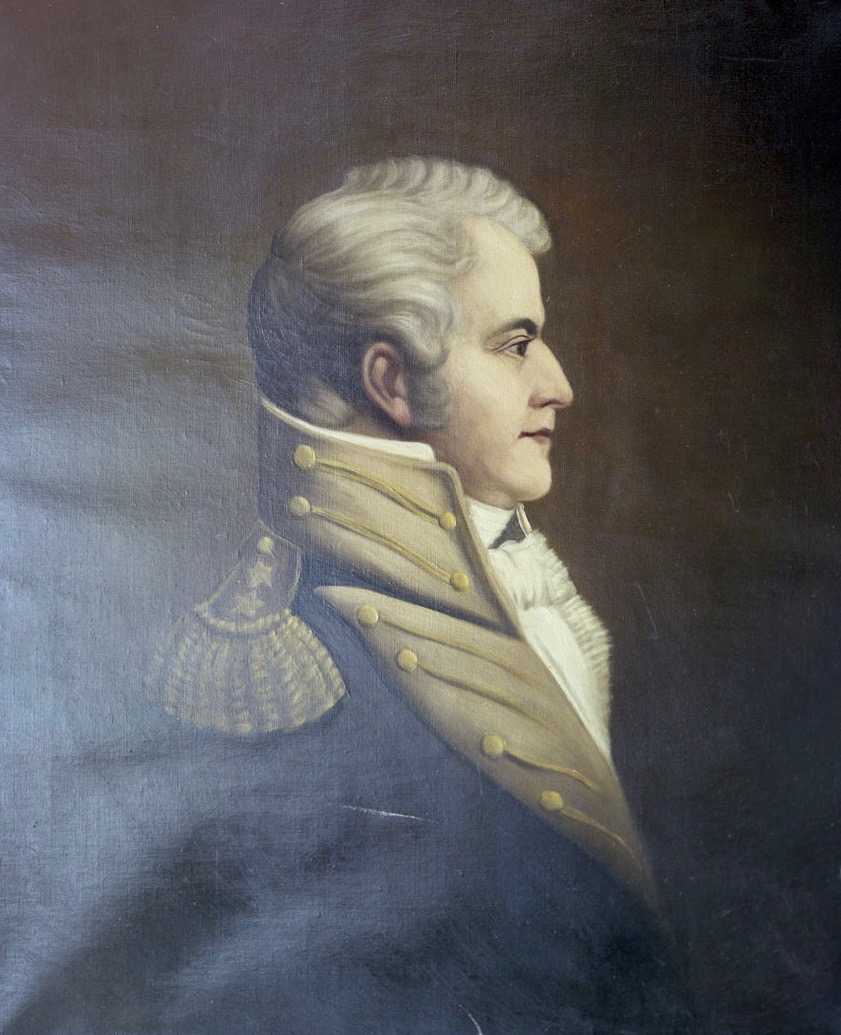
Nominee	Richard Dobbs Spaight	William Lenoir	John Baptista Ashe
Party	Federalist	Federalist	Federalist
Popular vote	68	39	30
Percentage	38.20%	21.91%	16.85%
Nominee	Benjamin Williams	Benjamin Smith
Party	Federalist	Federalist
Popular vote	28	9
Percentage	15.73%	5.06%
Governor before election
Alexander Martin
Federalist
Elected Governor
Richard Dobbs Spaight
Federalist

The 1792 North Carolina gubernatorial election was held on December 11, 1792, in order to elect the Governor of North Carolina. Federalist candidate Richard Dobbs Spaight was elected by the North Carolina General Assembly against Federalist candidate and incumbent Speaker of the North Carolina Senate William Lenoir, Federalist candidate and incumbent member of the U.S. House of Representatives from North Carolina's 3rd district John Baptista Ashe, Federalist candidate Benjamin Williams, Federalist candidate and incumbent member of the North Carolina Senate Benjamin Smith and Federalist candidate and incumbent member of the U.S. House of Representatives from North Carolina's 2nd district Nathaniel Macon.

== General election ==
On election day, December 11, 1792, Federalist candidate Richard Dobbs Spaight was elected by the North Carolina General Assembly by a margin of 29 votes against his foremost opponent Federalist candidate William Lenoir, thereby retaining Federalist control over the office of Governor. Spaight was sworn in as the 8th Governor of North Carolina on December 14, 1792.

=== Results ===
North Carolina gubernatorial election, 1792
Party	Candidate	Votes	%
Federalist	Richard Dobbs Spaight	68	38.20
Federalist	William Lenoir	39	21.91
Federalist	John Baptista Ashe	30	16.85
Federalist	Benjamin Williams	28	15.73
Federalist	Benjamin Smith	9	5.06
Federalist	Nathaniel Macon	4	2.25
Total votes		178	100.00
Federalist hold			
