= SS Timothy Bloodworth =

World War II Liberty ship of the United States

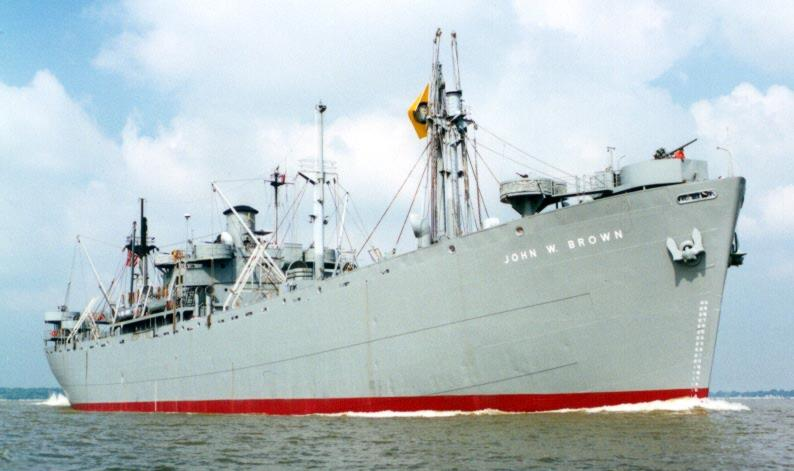
- Timothy Bloodworth was a standard Liberty ship, similar to SS John W. Brown, seen here.

History

United States
- Name: Timothy Bloodworth
- Namesake: Timothy Bloodworth
- Owner: War Shipping Administration
- Operator: Lykes Brothers Steamship Company
- Builder: Delta Shipbuilding Co, New Orleans
- Yard number: 44
- Way number: 8
- Laid down: 4 February 1943
- Launched: 17 March 1943
- Completed: 22 April 1943
- Identification: US Official Number: 243144; Code letters KIBU
- Fate: Scrapped 1963, Portland, Oregon

General characteristics
- Class & type: Liberty ship; type EC2-S-C1, standard
- Tonnage: 10,865 LT DWT; 7,176 GRT
- Length: 441 feet 6 inches (135 m) oa; 416 feet (127 m) pp; 427 feet (130 m) lwl
- Beam: 57 feet (17 m)
- Height: 34 ft 8 in (10.57 m)
- Draft: 27 ft 9.25 in (8.4646 m)
- Propulsion: 1 × triple-expansion steam engine, (manufactured by General Machinery Corp., Hamilton, Ohio); 1 × screw propeller
- Speed: 11.5 knots (21.3 km/h; 13.2 mph)
- Capacity: 562,608 cubic feet (15,931 m^{3}) (grain); 499,573 cubic feet (14,146 m^{3}) (bale)
- Crew: 38–62 USMM; 21–40 USNAG
- Armament: Varied by ship; Bow-mounted 3-inch (76 mm)/50-caliber gun; Stern-mounted 4-inch (102 mm)/50-caliber gun; 2–8 × single 20-millimeter (0.79 in) Oerlikon anti-aircraft (AA) cannons and/or, 2–8 × 37-millimeter (1.46 in) M1 AA guns

SS Timothy Bloodworth was a standard Liberty ship built for the United States Maritime Commission during World War II. The vessel was built by Delta Shipbuilding Company of New Orleans in 1943. She was named in honor of Timothy Bloodworth, an American teacher who made muskets and bayonets during the American Revolutionary War, then went on to become a statesman in North Carolina.

The ship was laid down in February 1943, launched in March, and delivered in April. Powered by a triple expansion steam engine manufactured by the Hamilton Engine Company, she was capable of a speed of 11 knots (20 km/h; 13 mph). She served in many transatlantic convoys supporting the buildup for and supply of the Allied invasion of Western Europe. On 24 December 1944, SS Timothy Bloodworth became the first ship to be damaged by a German V-2 rocket. Postwar, her periods of active service alternated with time in reserve, until she was sold for scrap in 1963.

== Design and construction ==
Liberty ships were a type of cargo ship with a uniform design intended to be quickly built for wartime needs during World War II. In general, Liberty ships were named after famous Americans, and Timothy Bloodworth was named for Timothy Bloodworth, a teacher and statesman from North Carolina. The ship was the 44th of 188 Liberty ships built by Delta Shipbuilding Company of New Orleans. Timothy Bloodworth (USMC hull number 1033) was laid down on 2 February 1943 on way number 8. She was launched on 17 March after spending 41 days on the ways. Timothy Bloodworth was completed on 22 April, after 36 days fitting out on the water. Her total construction time from keel laying to delivery was 77 days.

Timothy Bloodworth was 7,191 gross register tons (GRT) and was 441 feet 7 inches (134.59 m) long (length overall) and 56 feet 9 inches (17.30 m) abeam. She was electrically welded, and had a deadweight tonnage of 10,865 DWT. Like all Liberty ships, she had a single triple-expansion steam engine that drove a single screw propeller. Timothy Bloodworth's engine was built by the Hamilton Engine Co. of Hamilton, Ohio, and propelled the freighter at speeds of up to 11 knots (20 km/h; 13 mph). Her boilers were oil-fired.

== Wartime career ==
After Timothy Bloodworth's 22 April 1943 delivery to the War Shipping Administration, she was assigned to the Lykes Brothers Steamship Company for operation out of her homeport of New Orleans. Although details of Timothy Bloodworth's shakedown cruise and maiden voyage are not reported in sources, convoy records reveal she was at Guantanamo Bay, Cuba, on 8 June 1943 when she joined the New York-bound convoy GN 64. Timothy Bloodworth, fellow Liberty ships Henry George, Josiah Parker, and Moses Austin and the other 34 ships of the convoy reached New York uneventfully eight days later.

After a week at New York, Timothy Bloodworth and her three sister ships from GN 64—all loaded with sugar for delivery to the United Kingdom—joined some 56 other ships departing in convoy HX 245, bound for Liverpool, on 23 June. Three days after departure, an additional 26 ships from Halifax joined the convoy, and two days after that another three joined from St. John's, Newfoundland. There were no reported attacks on the convoy, but on 1 July, the British merchant aircraft carrier Empire MacAlpine collided with Empire Ibex, which sank two days later. Timothy Bloodworth and twelve other ships parted from HX 245 to sail to Loch Ewe in Scotland. There they were joined by two more ships to form convoy WN 451, headed to Methil, where they arrived on 9 July.

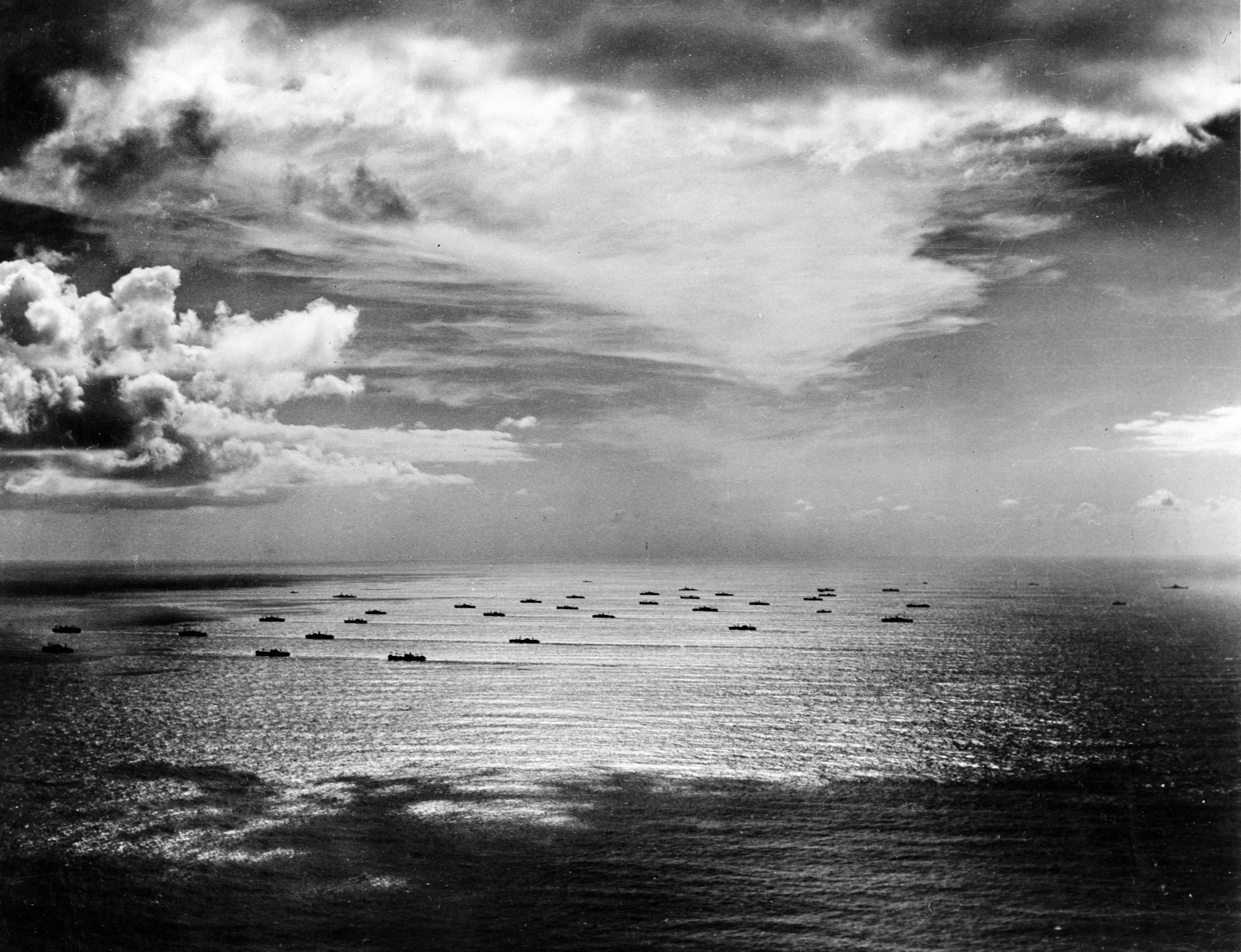
In her career, SS Timothy Bloodworth sailed in several transatlantic convoys, like this typical one seen in 1942.

After nearly a month at Methil, Timothy Bloodworth departed there on 4 August as a part of convoy EN 264 for Loch Ewe, and from the latter port, sailed as a part of the 78-ship convoy ON 196. Timothy Bloodworth is reported in convoy documents as destined for Halifax along with seven other ships, but other records indicate that the ship arrived at New York with the majority of the convoy on 21 August. Whatever her arrival port, she was recorded as sailing from Halifax on 22 August in convoy HF 72 and arriving at Saint John, New Brunswick two days later. She is next reported as sailing for Halifax on 16 September and then on to Liverpool as a part of convoy HX 257 on 18 September. With her cargo of grain and other cargo, Timothy Bloodworth arrived in Liverpool on 30 September, where she would remain for almost a month.

On 27 October, Timothy Bloodworth departed from Liverpool as a part of the combined convoys OS 57 and KMS 31. On 9 November, west of Gibraltar, KMS 31, Timothy Bloodworth's convoy, parted company with the other ships and headed into the Mediterranean. Timothy Bloodworth, however, headed into Gibraltar and docked there on 10 November. (Note: The convoy that Timothy Bloodworth departed, KMS 31, came under attack by German bombers which sank three convoy ships on 11 November. See: Beale, Nick. "The attack on "UNTRUE" (KMS-31), 11 November 1943". Ghost Bombers. Archived from the original on 24 July 2008.) The ship departed Gibraltar with convoy KMS 32 on 19 November and arrived at her destination of Malta on 24 November.

Timothy Bloodworth had made her way to Augusta by early December when she was recorded making a roundtrip to Brindisi between 6 and 21 December. By early January 1944, she had made her way to Bizerta, and from there on 8 January for Naples, where she arrived three days later. The cargo ship sailed from that port on 29 January, touching at Augusta the next day, and then joining convoy GUS 29 for Hampton Roads, Virginia. Sources show Timothy Bloodworth arriving at Hampton Roads on 15 February but do not report any movements until early May, when she is shown sailing for Liverpool.

Timothy Bloodworth, loaded with a cargo that included Motor Launches, departed New York on 6 May as a part of convoy HX 290 for Liverpool. After an uneventful crossing, she made port at Liverpool on 19 May. After unloading her cargo over the next two weeks, she departed for New York in convoy ON 239 and arrived there on 22 June. Timothy Bloodworth departed again for Liverpool on 11 July as a part of HX 299 and arrived after thirteen days.

The ship is next reported sailing from Southend to the Solent on 4 August, and from Portland to Seine Bay on 6 August. Timothy Bloodworth sailed from Seine Bay to Southampton from 5 to 6 September. The next day, she is recorded sailing from the Solent to the Bristol Channel, a week before sailing again for New York. After arriving at New York at the end of September, Timothy Bloodworth made her way to Boston over the next two weeks. Sailing from there on 14 October, she first sailed to Halifax and then on to Liverpool, where she arrived on 29 October. The freighter's movements over the next two months are not reported in sources.

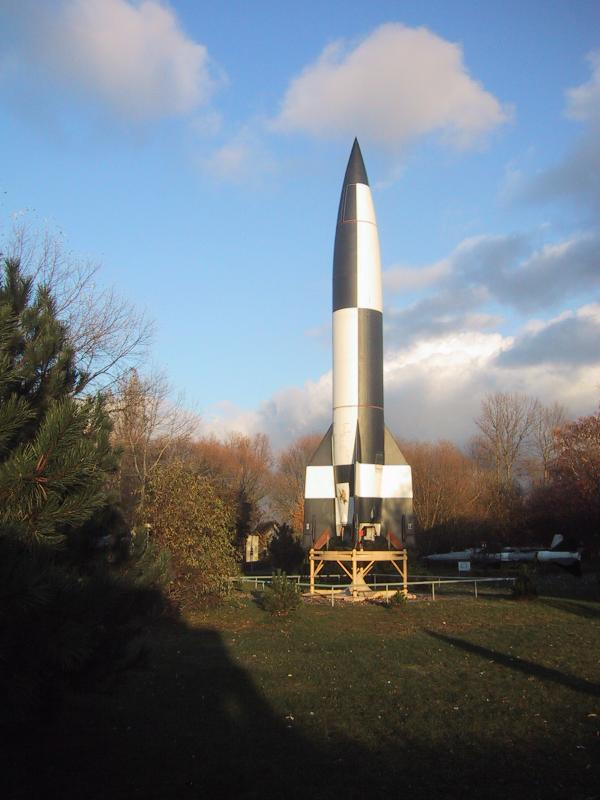
Timothy Bloodworth was slightly damaged in a V-2 (replica pictured) rocket attack on Antwerp in December 1944.

Timothy Bloodworth weathered two attacks in the month of December 1944. In the first attack—which occurred on 16 December, the first day of the German Ardennes Offensive—the ship suffered two casualties among her Naval Armed Guard detachment. The location of the ship, manner of attack, and circumstances of the two casualties are unspecified in secondary sources.

In the second December attack, Timothy Bloodworth was at anchor in Antwerp later in the month awaiting a New York-bound convoy. At about 14:10 on 24 December, a German V-2 rocket exploded overhead, showering the ship with shrapnel. A short time later, a second rocket hit nearby and more fragments pelted the ship, this time damaging the starboard side of the ship at the number one cargo hold. Although Timothy Bloodworth had a total of 68 people aboard—8 officers, 33 crewmen, 26 Armed Guard, and 1 passenger—no one was injured in either attack. Authors Benjamin King and Timothy J. Kutta, in their book Impact: The History of Germany's V-Weapons in World War II, report that Timothy Bloodworth was the first ship to be hit by V-2 fragments during the war.

The V-2 damage to Timothy Bloodworth was considered slight, so it did not prevent her from sailing from Antwerp two days later. On 30 December, she left Liverpool for New York and arrived on 13 January 1945. The cargo ship headed south to Hampton Roads and departed for Gibraltar on 7 February. She put in at Gibraltar on 23 February and sailed for Oran. From that port she returned to Hampton Roads on 24 March in convoy GUS 76. Timothy Bloodworth next sailed from New York for Liverpool, Southend, and Antwerp, arriving at the latter port on 30 April. She was at Antwerp on Victory in Europe Day. Timothy Bloodworth's last reported movement was in convoy ATM 168 from Antwerp to Southend on 28/29 May.

== Postwar career ==
After the German surrender, the War in the Pacific continued for another three months, but no secondary sources report any participation by Timothy Bloodworth, nor any of the ship's movements or whereabouts over the next two years. At 13:00 on 26 June 1947, Timothy Bloodworth entered the Reserve Fleet at Astoria, Oregon, where she would remain for most of the next 16 years.

Timothy Bloodworth was withdrawn from the Reserve Fleet on 6 July 1954. It is not reported where the ship went or whether it was under her own power, but she reentered the fleet on 17 July, loaded with grain. On 29 October 1956, after a little more than two years, she was again withdrawn from the Reserve Fleet to unload the grain, and was returned empty on 6 November.

On 18 September 1963, the United States Maritime Administration (a successor agency to the United States Maritime Commission (USMC)) began accepting bids for the scrap sale of Timothy Bloodworth. The sealed bids were opened on 9 October, and Zidell Explorations, Inc., with its bid of $45,000, was awarded the sale on 10 October. (Note: Zidell Explorations purchased a lot of three ships for $135,000 under contract PD-X-646. The other two ships' names are unreported on the Disposal Card. See: "Disposal Card (front)". Property Management & Archive Record System (PMARS). United States Maritime Administration. Archived from the original (scan of record) on 3 May 2012.) On 14 November, Timothy Bloodworth was withdrawn from the reserve fleet for scrapping in Portland, Oregon.

The bow section of Timothy Bloodworth, like that of all Liberty ships, was reinforced with concrete for strength. During the scrapping process, however, these sections were not reusable. Timothy Bloodworth's bow section was one of nearly 150 buried in the private Liberty Ship Memorial Park on the banks of Portland's Willamette River. In 2006, the park was razed when the land was sold for commercial development.

== Bibliography ==
- Browning, Robert M. (1996). U.S. Merchant Vessel War Casualties of World War II. Annapolis, Maryland: Naval Institute Press. ISBN 978-1-55750-087-8. OCLC 32310902.
- Cressman, Robert (2000). The Official Chronology of the U.S. Navy in World War II. Annapolis, Maryland: Naval Institute Press. ISBN 1-55750-149-1. OCLC 41977179.
- King, Benjamin; Timothy J. Kutta (2003) [1998]. Impact: The History of Germany's V-Weapons in World War II (1st Da Capo Press ed.). Cambridge, Massachusetts: Da Capo Press. ISBN 978-0-306-81292-7. OCLC 52396112.
