= 1805 North Carolina gubernatorial election =

- December 1805

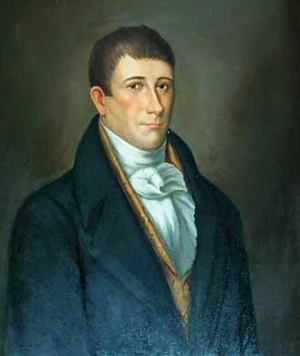
Nominee	Nathaniel Alexander	Benjamin Williams
Party	Democratic-Republican	Federalist
Popular vote	108	65
Percentage	62.43%	37.57%
Governor before election
James Turner
Democratic-Republican
Elected Governor
Nathaniel Alexander
Democratic-Republican

The 1805 North Carolina gubernatorial election was held in December 1805 in order to elect the Governor of North Carolina. Democratic-Republican candidate and former member of the U.S. House of Representatives from North Carolina's 10th district Nathaniel Alexander was elected by the North Carolina General Assembly against former Federalist Governor Benjamin Williams.

== General election ==
On election day in December 1805, Democratic-Republican candidate Nathaniel Alexander was elected by the North Carolina General Assembly by a margin of 43 votes against his opponent former Federalist Governor Benjamin Williams, thereby retaining Democratic-Republican control over the office of Governor. Alexander was sworn in as the 13th Governor of North Carolina on December 10, 1805.

=== Results ===
North Carolina gubernatorial election, 1805
Party	Candidate	Votes	%
Democratic-Republican	Nathaniel Alexander	108	62.43
Federalist	Benjamin Williams	65	37.57
Total votes		173	100.00
Democratic-Republican hold			
