= Meshack Franklin =

American politician

Member of the U.S. House of Representatives from North Carolina
- In office March 4, 1807 – March 3, 1815
- Preceded by: Joseph Winston
- Succeeded by: Lewis Williams
- Constituency: 12th district (1807–1813); 13th district (1813–1815)

Member of the North Carolina House of Representatives
- In office 1800–1801

Personal details
- Born: 1772 Surry County, North Carolina, British America
- Died: December 18, 1839 (aged 66–67) Surry County, North Carolina, U.S.
- Party: Democratic-Republican
- Relatives: Jesse Franklin (brother)

Meshack Franklin (1772 – December 18, 1839) was a U.S. representative from North Carolina; born in Surry County, North Carolina, in 1772; Brother of Jesse Franklin. member of the State house of commons in 1800 and 1801; served in the State senate in 1828, 1829, and 1838; elected as a Democratic-Republican to the Tenth and to the three succeeding Congresses (March 4, 1807 – March 3, 1815); died in Surry County, N.C., December 18, 1839. Franklin's house, built by his father-in-law Gideon Edwards in 1799, is currently owned and maintained by the Surry County Historical Society as the Edwards-Franklin House.

== See also ==
- Tenth United States Congress
- Eleventh United States Congress
- Twelfth United States Congress
- Thirteenth United States Congress

U.S. House of Representatives
| Preceded by Joseph Winston | Member of the U.S. House of Representatives from North Carolina's 12th congressional district 1807–1813 | Succeeded by Israel Pickens |
| Preceded by District created | Member of the U.S. House of Representatives from North Carolina's 13th congressional district 1813–1815 | Succeeded by Lewis Williams |
