= Timothy Bloodworth =

American politician (1736–1814)

United States Senator from North Carolina
- In office March 4, 1795 – March 4, 1801
- Preceded by: Benjamin Hawkins
- Succeeded by: David Stone

Member of the U.S. House of Representatives from North Carolina's 3rd district
- In office April 6, 1790 – March 3, 1791
- Preceded by: District created
- Succeeded by: John B. Ashe

Member of the North Carolina House of Representatives
- In office 1793–1794

Member of the North Carolina Senate
- In office 1788–1789

Personal details
- Born: 1736 New Hanover County, Province of North Carolina, British America
- Died: August 24, 1814 (aged 77–78) Wilmington, North Carolina, United States
- Party: Democratic-Republican
- Children: 2

Timothy James Bloodworth (1736 – August 24, 1814) was an American anti-Federalist politician. He was a leader of the American Revolution and later served as a member of the Confederation Congress, U.S. congressman and senator, and collector of customs for the Port of Wilmington, North Carolina.

== Early life and career ==
Bloodworth was born 1736 in North Carolina to Timothy Bloodworth Sr. who had migrated to North Carolina from Virginia in the early 1700s. He spent most of his life before the American Revolutionary War as a teacher. He owned 9 slaves and had over 4,000 acres of land.

He had two brothers, James and Thomas, who were active local politicians.

In 1776, he began making arms including muskets and bayonets for the Continental Army. In 1778 and 1779, he served as a member of the North Carolina state legislature. Following this, he held a number of political posts sequentially until serving as a delegate to the Continental Congress in 1786. He served as an Anti-Federalist delegate from New Hannover County to the Fayetteville Convention on the U.S. Constitution in 1789.:

He was elected to the First United States Congress as a member of the House of Representatives, serving from 1790 to 1791 before returning to the North Carolina state legislature. In 1794 Bloodworth was elected to the United States Senate, where he served from 1795 to 1801. From then until 1807, Bloodworth served as collector of customs in Wilmington, North Carolina.

During the Second World War, Liberty ship SS Timothy Bloodworth was named in his honor.

== See also ==
- Benjamin Hawkins
- Thomas Jefferson

Political offices
| Preceded by John Ashe | North Carolina State Treasurer for the Wilmington District; 1781–1784 | Succeeded by Memucan Hunt as singular Treasurer of North Carolina |
U.S. House of Representatives
| Preceded by District created | U.S. Representative (District 3) from North Carolina; 1790–1791 | Succeeded by John B. Ashe |
U.S. Senate
| Preceded by Benjamin Hawkins | U.S. senator (Class 3) from North Carolina; 1795–1801; Served alongside: Alexander Martin, Jesse Franklin | Succeeded by David Stone |
