= 1799 North Carolina gubernatorial election =

- November 22, 1799
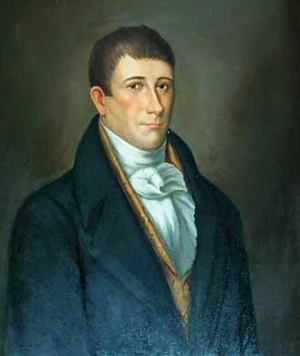
Nominee	Benjamin Williams
Party	Federalist
Popular vote	1
Percentage	100.00%
Governor before election
William Richardson Davie
Federalist
Elected Governor
Benjamin Williams
Federalist

The 1799 North Carolina gubernatorial election was held on November 22, 1799, in order to elect the Governor of North Carolina. Federalist candidate Benjamin Williams was elected by the North Carolina General Assembly as he ran unopposed. The exact number of votes cast in this election is unknown.

== General election ==
On election day, November 22, 1799, Federalist candidate Benjamin Williams was elected by the North Carolina General Assembly, thereby retaining Federalist control over the office of Governor. Williams was sworn in as the 11th Governor of North Carolina on November 23, 1799.

=== Results ===
North Carolina gubernatorial election, 1799
Party	Candidate	Votes	%
Federalist	Benjamin Williams	1	100.00
Total votes		1	100.00
Federalist hold			
