= 1805 Tennessee gubernatorial election =

- August 1–2, 1805
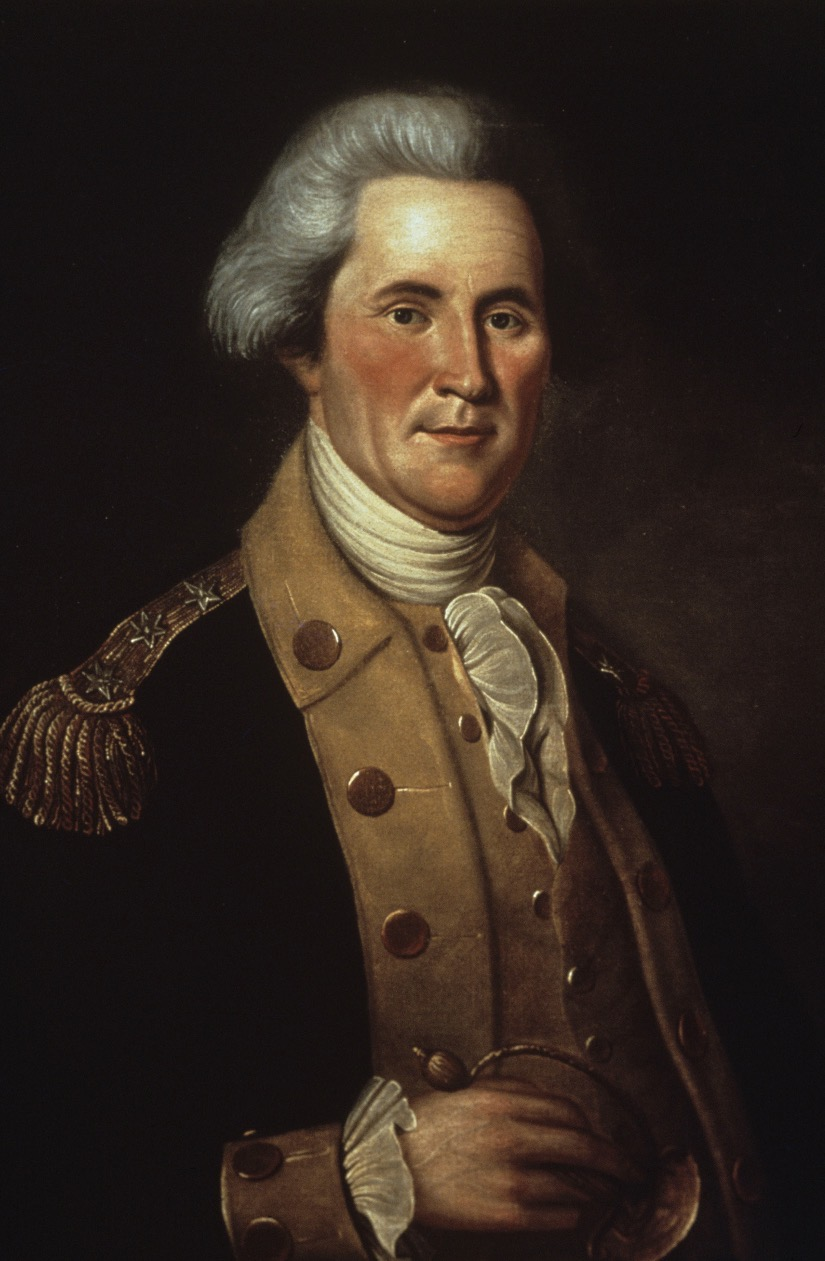

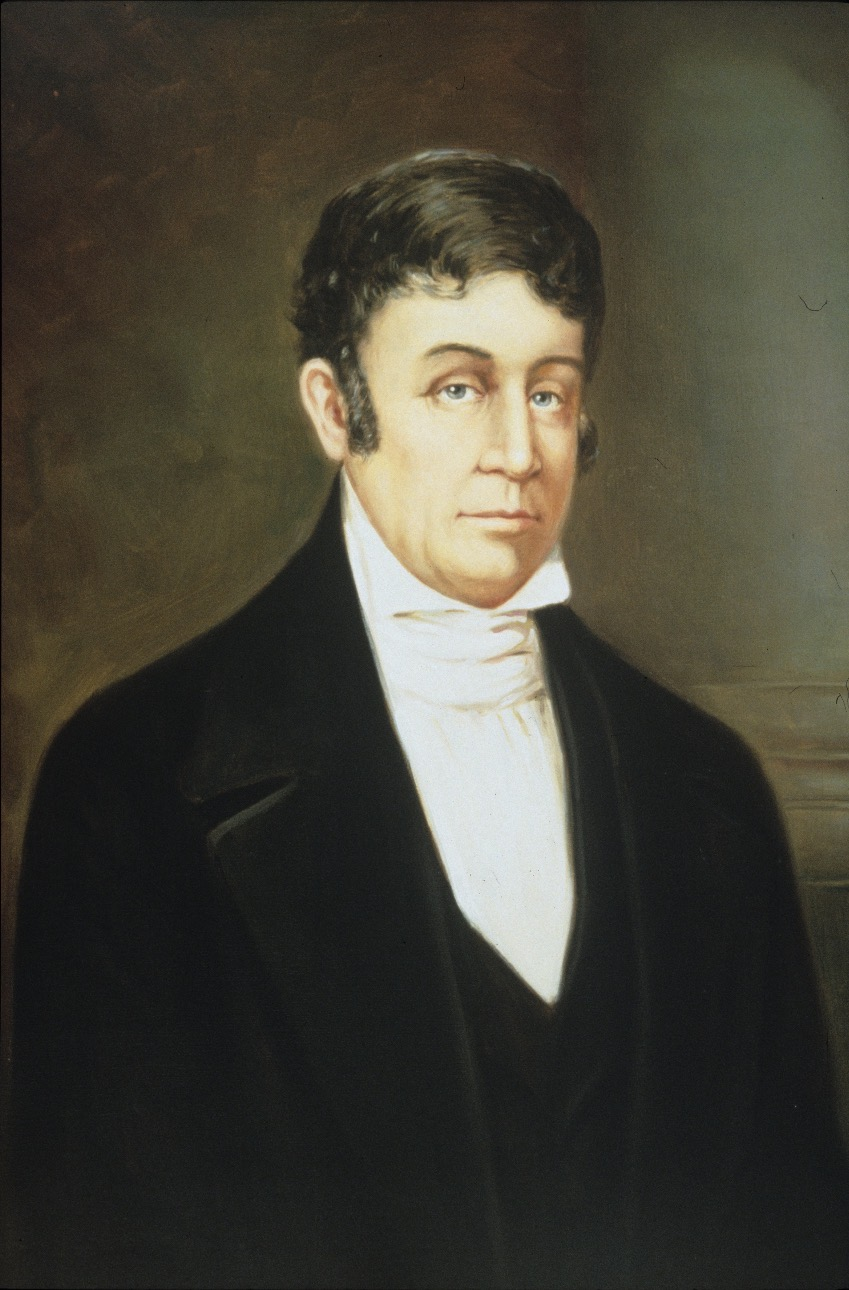
Nominee	John Sevier	Archibald Roane
Party	Democratic-Republican	Democratic-Republican
Popular vote	10,293	5,855
Percentage	63.74%	36.26%
- County results Sevier: 50–60% 60–70% 70–80% 80–90% >90% Roane: 50–60% No data/No votes
Governor before election
John Sevier
Democratic-Republican
Elected Governor
John Sevier
Democratic-Republican

The 1805 Tennessee gubernatorial election took place from August 1–2, 1805. Former governor Archibald Roane attempted to retake the governorship back but was defeated by incumbent governor John Sevier, who had taken 63.74% of the vote.

== Results ==
Tennessee gubernatorial election, 1805
Party	Candidate	Votes	%
Democratic-Republican	John Sevier (incumbent)	10,293	63.74%
Democratic-Republican	Archibald Roane	5,855	36.26%
Total votes		16,148	100.00%

== See also ==
- 1805 United States gubernatorial elections
