= Joseph Winston =

American farmer and politician (1746–1815)

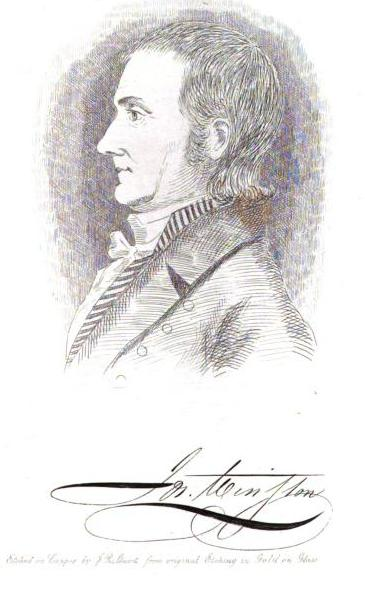
- Joseph Winston

Member of the U.S. House of Representatives from North Carolina's 12th district
- In office 1803–1807
- Preceded by: seat established
- Succeeded by: Meshack Franklin

Member of the U.S. House of Representatives from North Carolina's 3rd district
- In office 1793–1795
- Preceded by: John Ashe
- Succeeded by: Jesse Franklin

Personal details
- Born: June 17, 1746 Louisa County, Virginia Colony, British America
- Died: April 21, 1815 (aged 68) Germanton, North Carolina, U.S.
- Military career
- Burial place: Guilford Courthouse National Military Park
- Allegiance: United States of America
- Branch: North Carolina militia
- Service years: 1775-1783
- Rank: Lieutenant Colonel
- Unit: Surry County Regiment

Lieutenant Colonel Joseph Winston (June 17, 1746 – April 21, 1815) was an American pioneer, politician and American Revolutionary War hero from Surry County, North Carolina, and the first cousin of statesman and Virginia governor Patrick Henry. He also served in the United States House of Representatives and North Carolina Senate. In 1766, Winston moved to the northern part of Rowan County, North Carolina, the area which subsequently became the current Stokes County, North Carolina.

== Early life ==
Joseph Winston was born on June 17, 1746, in Louisa County in the Colony of Virginia. His ancestors emigrated to the American colonies from Yorkshire, England, in the 17th century. His father was Samuel Winston. In his youth, he fought with the Virginia militia against border Indians in 1763 before moving to the province of North Carolina in the late 1760s. He settled on the Town Fork of the Dan River in what was Surry County and later became Stokes County, North Carolina.

== Career ==
Before the war, he was elected a delegate to the North Carolina Provincial Congress in Hillsborough. He was a member of the Surry County Committee of Safety. In 1775, he was selected as a delegate from Surry County to the North Carolina Provincial Congress in Halifax in April 1776. He was the entry taker (register of deeds) for Surry County in 1778, where he assisted the Moravians in their Wachovia settlement.

During the American Revolutionary War, he was a 2nd major and 1st major in the Surry County Regiment of the North Carolina militia, leading a unit of riflemen in several important battles, including the Battle of Moore's Creek Bridge, Battle of Kings Mountain and the Battle of Guilford Court House.

Winston later represented North Carolina as a U.S. Congressman and also served in the North Carolina Senate (1787–1789).

Winston owned slaves.

== Death ==
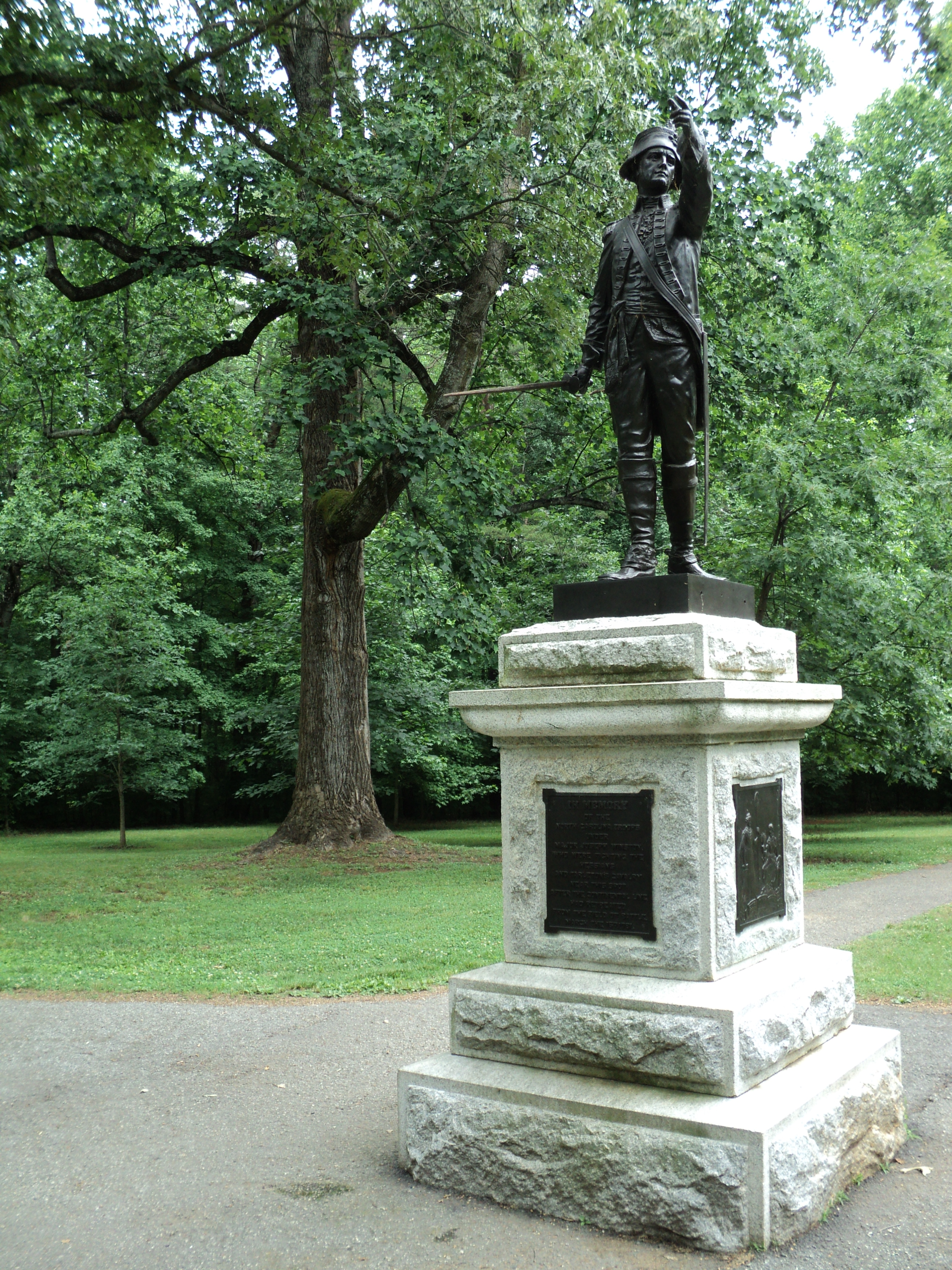
Monument to Major Joseph Winston, Guilford Courthouse National Military Park

He is buried in the National Park at the site of the Battle of Guilford Court House, where a monument erected in 1893 notes Major Winston's command of the militia forces. The town of Winston, North Carolina (which later became part of Winston-Salem), is named for him.

- United States Congress. "Joseph Winston (id: W000642)". Biographical Directory of the United States Congress.

U.S. House of Representatives
Preceded by John B. Ashe	Member of the U.S. House of Representatives from North Carolina's 3rd congressional district 1793-1795	Succeeded by Jesse Franklin
Preceded by District created	Member of the U.S. House of Representatives from North Carolina's 12th congressional district 1803-1807	Succeeded by Meshack Franklin
