= David Stone (politician) =

American politician (1770–1818)

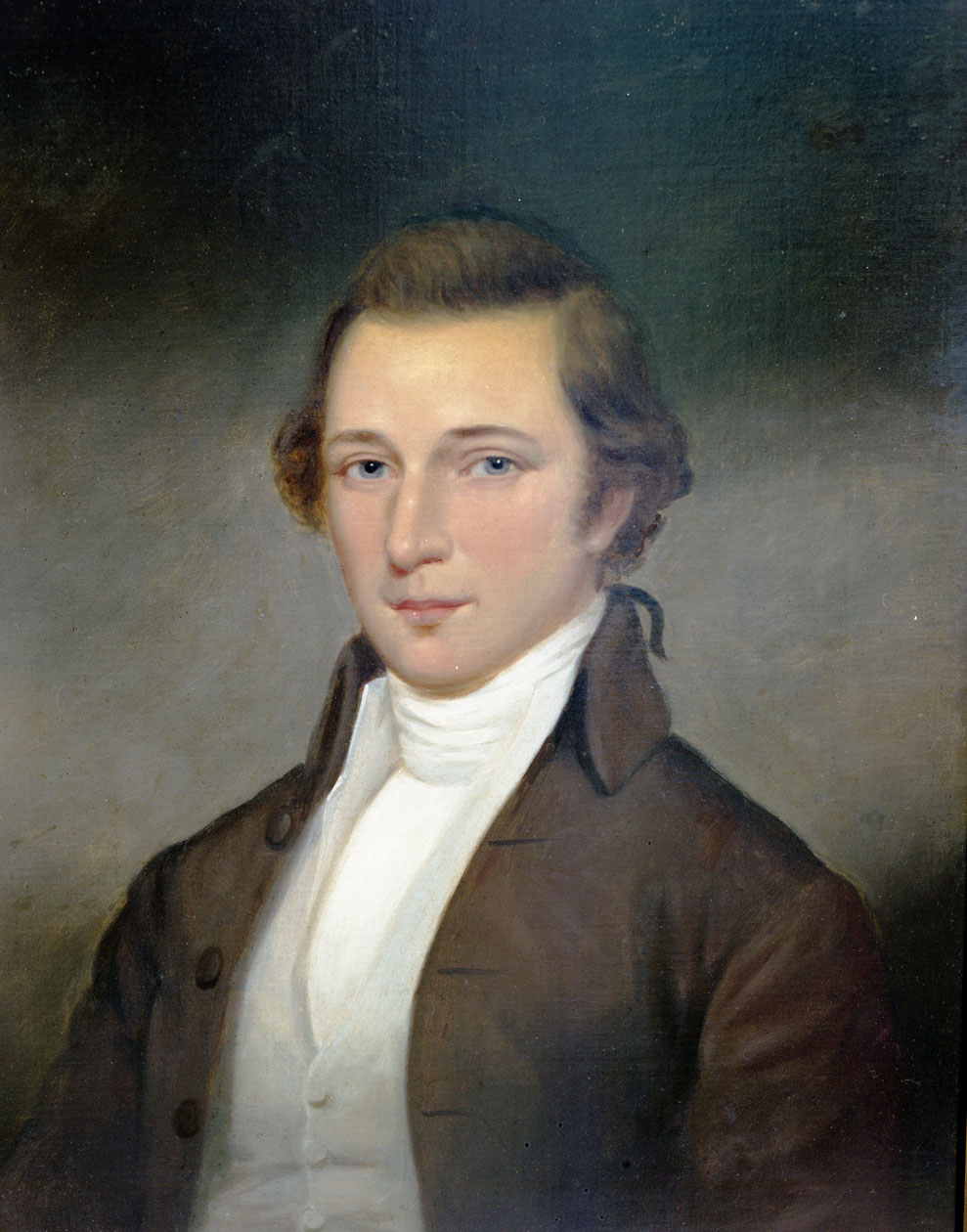

Member of the U.S. House of Representatives from North Carolina's 8th district
- In office March 4, 1799 – March 3, 1801
- Preceded by: Dempsey Burges
- Succeeded by: Charles Johnson

United States Senator from North Carolina
- In office March 4, 1801 – February 17, 1807
- Preceded by: Timothy Bloodworth
- Succeeded by: Jesse Franklin
- In office March 4, 1813 – December 24, 1814
- Preceded by: Jesse Franklin
- Succeeded by: Francis Locke, Jr.

15th Governor of North Carolina
- In office December 12, 1808 – December 1, 1810
- Preceded by: Benjamin Williams
- Succeeded by: Benjamin Smith

Personal details
- Born: February 17, 1770 Bertie County, Province of North Carolina, British America
- Died: October 7, 1818 (aged 48) near Raleigh, North Carolina, U.S.
- Party: Democratic-Republican
- Spouse(s): Hannah Turner, Sarah Dashiell
- Children: son and 5 daughters
- Education: Princeton University
- Profession: Lawyer, judge, politician

David Stone (February 17, 1770 – October 7, 1818) was an American lawyer, judge and politician who served as the 15th Governor of North Carolina (1808 to 1810). Stone served as U.S. senator from North Carolina before and after his governorship (1801-1807 and 1813-1814). He also served in the North Carolina convention which ratified the U.S. Constitution, as well as in the state legislature and judge in Bertie County.

== Early life and education ==
Stone was born in Bertie County in the Province of North Carolina, the son of Elizabeth Hobson and her husband, planter and politician Zedekiah Stone Jr. (1740-1796). His paternal ancestors had immigrated to the Massachusetts colony by 1618, and his father Zedekiah had moved to North Carolina, where he served in the state legislature and supported patriots during the American Revolutionary War. Young Stone had a sister, Elizabeth, who reached adulthood and married twice (surviving her first husband Dr. Archer Wolford and marrying Jaspar Charlton). Meanwhile, David Stone attended Windsor Academy and later the College of New Jersey (now Princeton University), where he graduated with honors. Returning to North Carolina, Stone studied law in Halifax.

== Career ==
Receiving his law license in 1789, Stone had a private legal practice in several counties. He also operated plantations using enslaved labor. After marrying, Stone began constructing a large manor house which he called "Hope Plantation" on land given him by his father, Zedekiah Stone. In the 1800 federal census, Stone owned 59 people in Bertie County. A decade later, in the last census in Stone's lifetime, he enslaved 98 people.

Consistent with his interest in internal improvements discussed below, Stone became president of the Neuse River Navigation Company in May 1818, months before his death.

== Politics ==
In 1789, Stone was a member of the convention in Fayetteville which ratified the United States Constitution. He proceeded to represent Bertie County in the North Carolina House of Commons until 1795, when he was named to the North Carolina Superior Court.

In 1798, Stone stepped down from the court to serve in the United States House of Representatives for one term; during the contested 1800 presidential election, he cast his vote for Thomas Jefferson when the election was sent to the House for a final decision.

Re-elected in a bid for a second term in the House, Stone resigned when he was elected to the United States Senate by the North Carolina General Assembly in late 1800. He sat as a justice of the Bertie County Court in the early 1800s, including the 1802 scare over a slave rebellion in Bertie County. He resigned his seat in the Senate in 1807 to return to the state Superior Court, but was there for only a year before being elected Governor of North Carolina by the legislature in November 1808.

As Governor, Stone was an ardent supporter of agricultural and industrial development, as well as of the expansion to the education system to both sexes and all social classes. Stone was re-elected in 1809 but was defeated for a third one-year term in 1810 by Benjamin Smith. Following his defeat, Stone served in the North Carolina House of Commons for a year before being named to the U.S. Senate once again in 1813.

Stone's second term in the U.S. Senate lasted only a year; he was censured by the NC General Assembly for failing to support the administration during the War of 1812. Stone resigned his Senate seat in December 1814, retiring to his Wake County plantation.

== Personal life ==
He married twice and had five children. On March 13, 1793, Stone married Hannah Turner, who bore eleven children, but only five daughters and a son (David Williamson Stone) reached adulthood. After Hannah's death, the widower remarried in Washington D.C. to Sarah Dashiell, who survived him by two decades, but the couple had no children.

== Death and legacy ==
Stone died at Restdale, his Wake County plantation in 1818, and was buried there overlooking the Neuse River. Hope Plantation was listed on the National Register of Historic Places and offers tours. His papers are held by the North Carolina archives. Duke University's library has Hicks family papers.

North Carolina also remembered Stone by erecting a highway marker in Bertie County on the US-13 bypass near his Hope plantation. His daughter Rebecca Stone remained in North Carolina, marrying first Samuel Garland in Wake County, then John Rains Lucas in Bertie County. David W. Stone died in 1848, a prominent citizen of Raleigh and cashier of the Cape Fear Bank did not continue his father's political involvement. His sister Sallie (1807-1872) married Robert Haughey Cowan and moved to Wilmington, North Carolina. She was their only Stone sibling to survive the American Civil War, and her sons Col. Robert H. Cowan and David S. Cowen served as Confederate officers and also survived the conflict. Her sister Elizabeth (1805- 1837) married prominent lawyer and planter Edward Broadnax Hicks (1789-1857) of Lawrenceville, Virginia, whose practice included both states and whose investments ranged to Arkansas and New Orleans. They had several children, but few reached adulthood. Their son David Stone Hicks (b. 1826) became a Virginia lawyer and judge. His sister (this man's granddaughter) Pattie Hicks Buford (1836-1901), was educated by an aunt after her mother's death, and then in Raleigh. She married a Virginia lawyer who served as a Confederate artillery officer and later as a Virginia legislator and judge. Pattie Buford became known for her efforts to improve race relations both before and after the conflict, including educating first slaves then freed African Americans, as well as establishing a hospital and facilitating the ministry of Rev. James Solomon Russell.

U.S. House of Representatives
Preceded by Dempsey Burges	United States Representative in Congress from North Carolina's 8th congressional district 1799–1801	Succeeded by Charles Johnson
U.S. Senate
Preceded by Timothy Bloodworth	U.S. senator (Class 3) from North Carolina; 1801–1807; Served alongside: Jesse Franklin, James Turner	Succeeded by Jesse Franklin
Preceded by Jesse Franklin	U.S. senator (Class 3) from North Carolina; 1813–1814; Served alongside: James Turner	Succeeded by Francis Locke, Jr.
Political offices
Preceded by Benjamin Williams	Governor of North Carolina; 1808–1810	Succeeded by Benjamin Smith
