= 1805 New Jersey gubernatorial election =

- October 29, 1805
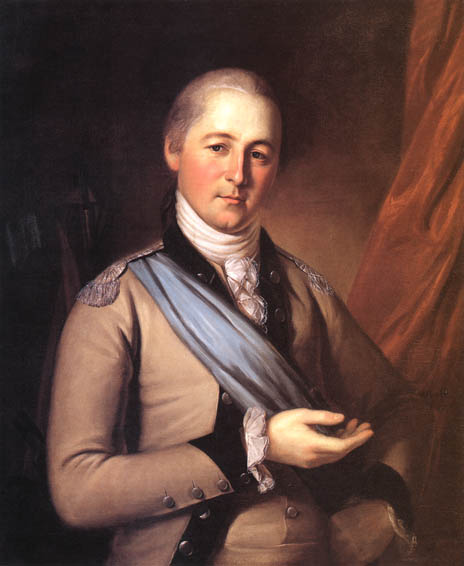
Nominee	Joseph Bloomfield
Party	Democratic-Republican
Popular vote	53
Percentage	100.00%
Governor before election
Joseph Bloomfield
Democratic-Republican
Elected Governor
Joseph Bloomfield
Democratic-Republican

The 1805 New Jersey gubernatorial election was held on October 29, 1805, in order to elect the governor of New Jersey. Incumbent Democratic-Republican governor Joseph Bloomfield was unanimously re-elected by the New Jersey General Assembly as he ran unopposed.

== General election ==
On election day, October 29, 1805, incumbent Democratic-Republican governor Joseph Bloomfield was unanimously re-elected by the New Jersey General Assembly as he ran unopposed, thereby retaining Democratic-Republican control over the office of governor. Bloomfield was sworn in for his fourth term that same day.

=== Results ===
New Jersey gubernatorial election, 1805
Party	Candidate	Votes	%
Democratic-Republican	Joseph Bloomfield (incumbent)	53	100.00%
Total votes		53	100.00%
Democratic-Republican hold			
