= 1805 Georgia gubernatorial election =

- November 4, 1805
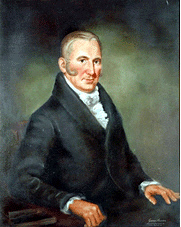
Nominee	John Milledge
Party	Democratic-Republican
Popular vote	61
Percentage	100.00%
Governor before election
John Milledge
Democratic-Republican
Elected Governor
John Milledge
Democratic-Republican

The 1805 Georgia gubernatorial election was held on November 4, 1805, in order to elect the governor of Georgia. Incumbent Democratic-Republican governor John Milledge won re-election in a Georgia General Assembly vote as he ran unopposed.

== General election ==
On election day, November 4, 1805, incumbent Democratic-Republican governor John Milledge won re-election as he ran unopposed. Milledge was sworn in for his second full term on November 4, 1805.

=== Results ===
Georgia gubernatorial election, 1805
Party	Candidate	Votes	%
Democratic-Republican	John Milledge (incumbent)	61	100.00
Total votes		61	100.00
Democratic-Republican hold			
