= 1805 Maryland gubernatorial election =

- November 11, 1805
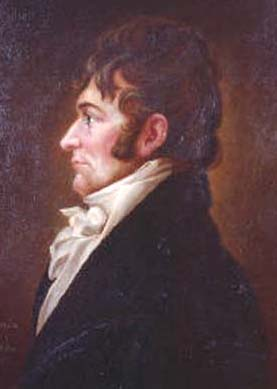
Nominee	Robert Bowie
Party	Democratic-Republican
Popular vote	1
Percentage	100.00%
Governor before election
Robert Bowie
Democratic-Republican
Elected Governor
Robert Bowie
Democratic-Republican

The 1805 Maryland gubernatorial election was held on November 11, 1805, in order to elect the governor of Maryland. Incumbent Democratic-Republican governor Robert Bowie was easily re-elected by the Maryland General Assembly as he ran unopposed. The exact results of this election are unknown.

== General election ==
On election day, November 11, 1805, incumbent Democratic-Republican governor Robert Bowie was re-elected by the Maryland General Assembly, thereby retaining Democratic-Republican control over the office of governor. Bowie was sworn in for his third term on November 17, 1805.

=== Results ===
Maryland gubernatorial election, 1805
Party	Candidate	Votes	%
Democratic-Republican	Robert Bowie (incumbent)	1	100.00
Total votes		1	100.00
Democratic-Republican hold			
