= 1805 Virginia gubernatorial election =

- December 7, 1805
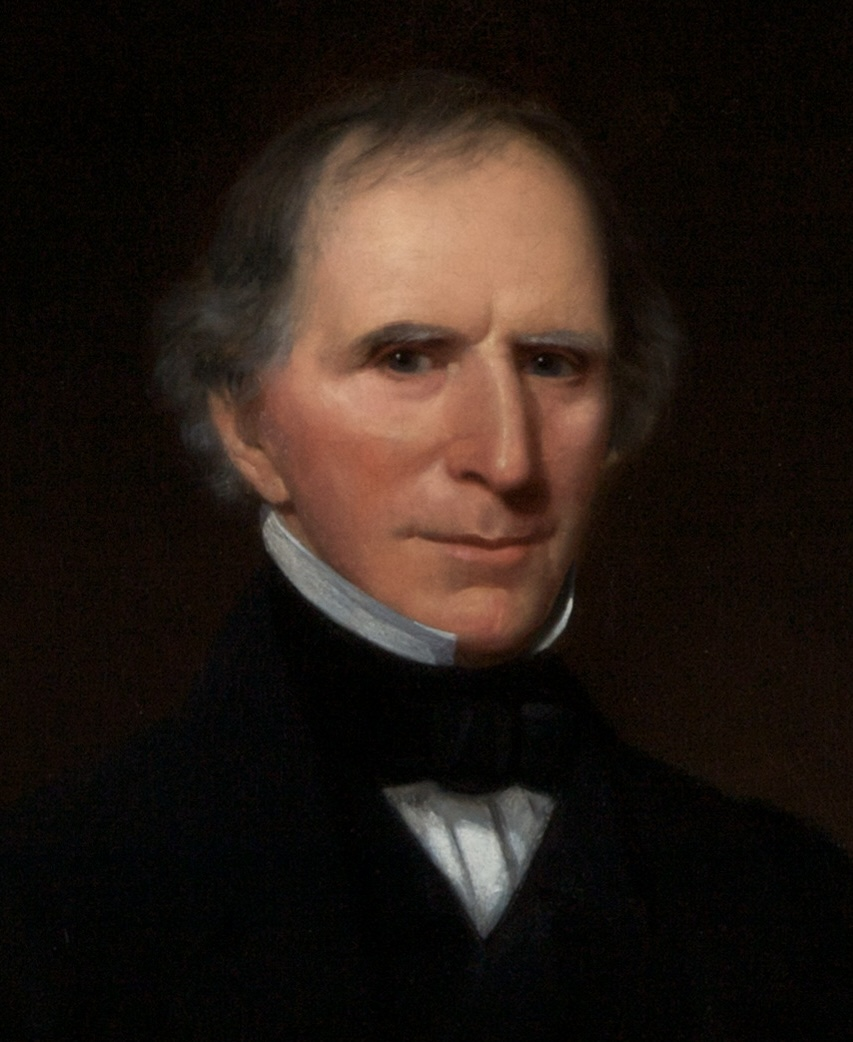

Nominee	William H. Cabell	Alexander MacRae
Party	Democratic-Republican	Democratic-Republican
1st ballot	99	90
Governor before election
John Page
Democratic-Republican
Elected Governor
William H. Cabell
Democratic-Republican

A gubernatorial election was held in Virginia on December 7, 1805. The Democratic-Republican former member of the Virginia House of Delegates from Amherst County William H. Cabell defeated the Democratic-Republican member of the Council of State Alexander MacRae.

The incumbent governor of Virginia John Page was ineligible for re-election due to term limits established by the Constitution of Virginia. The election was conducted by the Virginia General Assembly in joint session. Democratic-Republicans formed a majority on the joint ballot, but were divided between supporters of Cabell and MacRae. Most of the Democratic-Republican members supported MacRae, while all but five of the 28 to 30 Federalists voted for Cabell. Cabell was elected with a majority on the first ballot. The closeness of the election, with Federalist legislators supplying Cabell's entire margin of victory, led observers to characterize the result as a triumph of Federalist principles.

== General election ==
1805 Virginia gubernatorial election
Party	Candidate	First ballot	
Party	Candidate	Count	Percent
Democratic-Republican	William H. Cabell	99	52.38
Democratic-Republican	Alexander MacRae	90	47.62
Total		182	100.00

== Bibliography ==
- Lampi, Philip J. (2012). "Virginia 1805 Governor". A New Nation Votes. American Antiquarian Society.
- Sobel, Robert; Raimo, John (1978). Biographical Directory of the Governors of the United States 1789–1978. Vol. 4. Westport, CT: Meckler Books.
