= 1805 Massachusetts gubernatorial election =

- April 2, 1805
- Turnout: 16.30% of population (▲3.48)
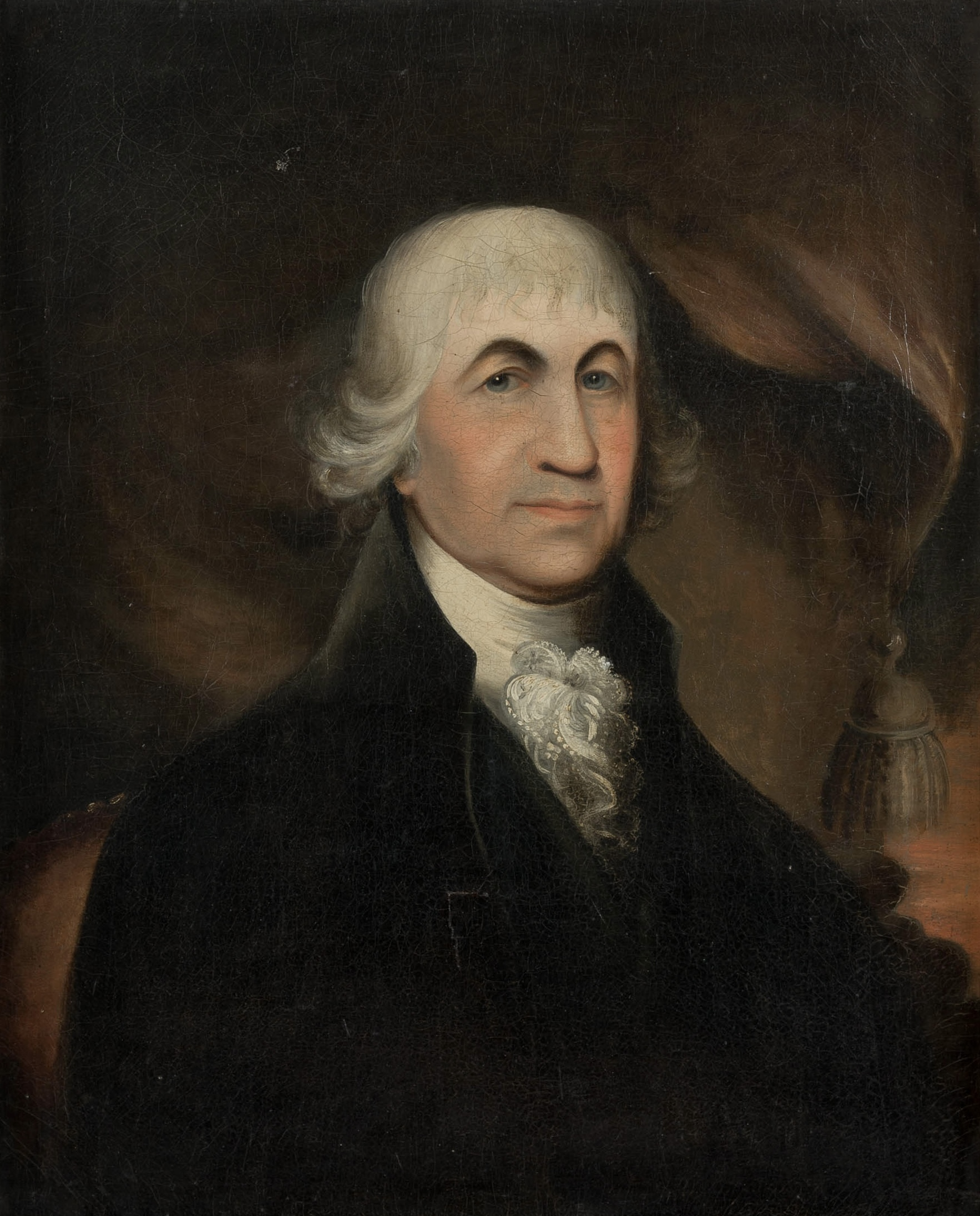

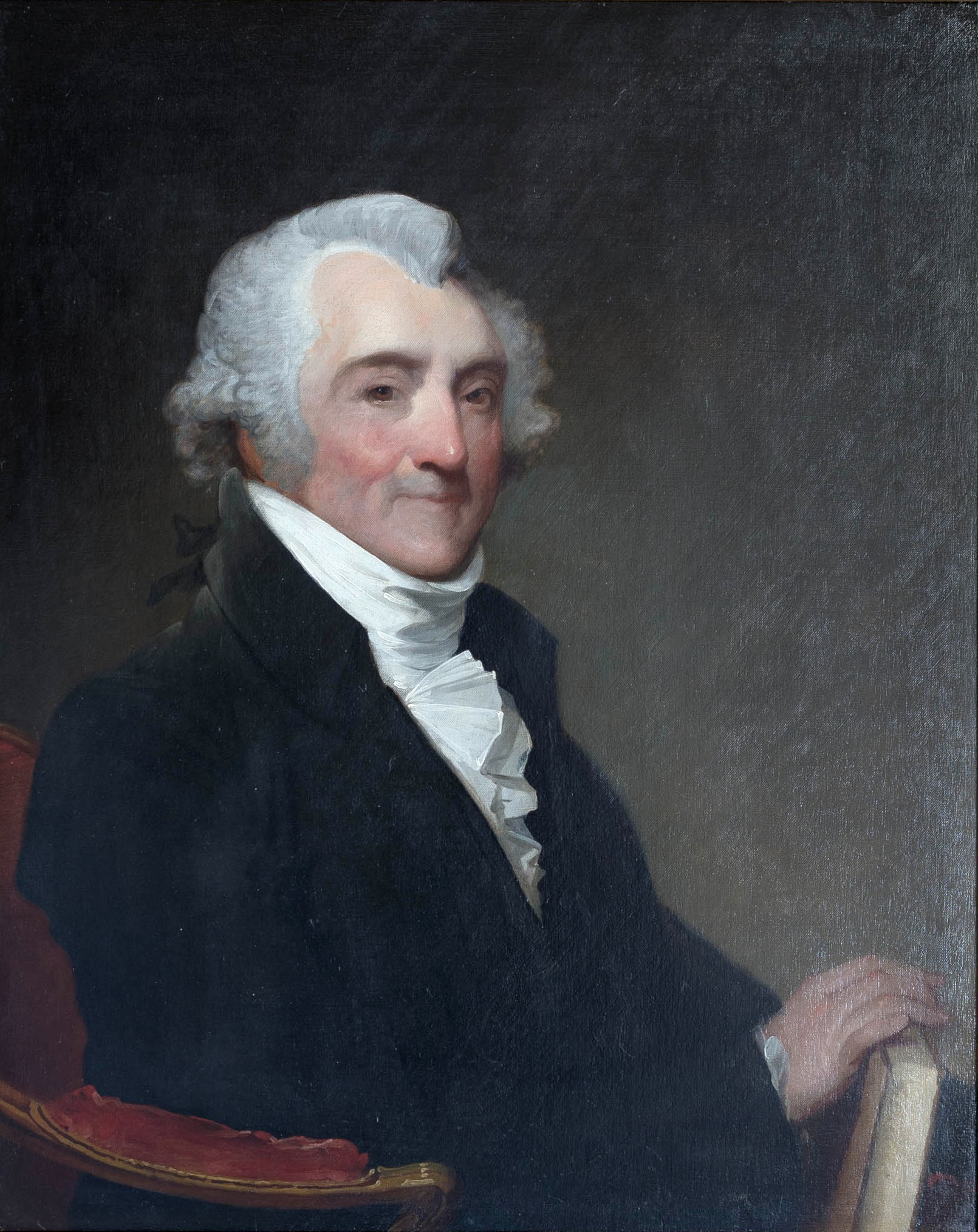
Nominee	Caleb Strong	James Sullivan
Party	Federalist	Democratic-Republican
Popular vote	35,213	33,743
Percentage	50.89%	48.77%
- County results Strong: 50–60% 60–70% 70–80% Sullivan: 50–60% 60–70% 70–80%
Governor before election
Caleb Strong
Federalist
Elected Governor
Caleb Strong
Federalist

The 1805 Massachusetts gubernatorial election was held on April 2.

Federalist Governor Caleb Strong was re-elected to a sixth consecutive one-year term in office, defeating Republican James Sullivan for the second time, only narrowly achieving the majority necessary for election.

== General election ==
=== Results ===
1805 Massachusetts gubernatorial election
Party	Candidate	Votes	%	±%
Federalist	Caleb Strong (incumbent)	35,213	50.89%	▼4.13
Democratic-Republican	James Sullivan	33,743	48.77%	▲4.14
Others	Scattering	239	0.35%	▼0.01
Total votes		69,195	100.00%	
Federalist hold		Swing		
