= James Turner (North Carolina politician) =

American politician (1766–1824)

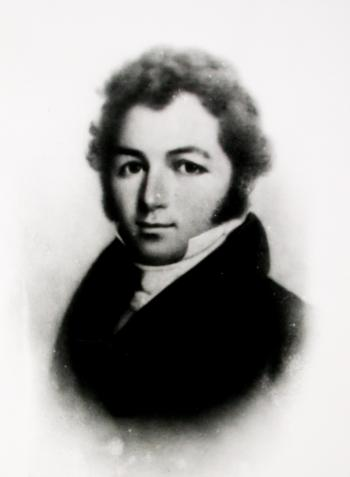

12th Governor of North Carolina
- In office December 6, 1802 – December 10, 1805
- Preceded by: John Ashe (Elect)
- Succeeded by: Nathaniel Alexander

United States Senator from North Carolina
- In office March 4, 1805 – November 21, 1816
- Preceded by: Jesse Franklin
- Succeeded by: Montfort Stokes

Member of the North Carolina House of Representatives
- In office 1799–1800

Member of the North Carolina Senate
- In office 1801–1802

Personal details
- Born: December 20, 1766 Southampton County, Colony of Virginia, British America
- Died: January 15, 1824 (aged 57) Warren County, North Carolina, U.S.
- Party: Democratic-Republican

James Turner (December 20, 1766 – January 15, 1824) was the 12th Governor of the U.S. state of North Carolina from 1802 to 1805. He later served as a U.S. Senator from 1805 to 1816.

Turner was born in Southampton County in the Colony of Virginia; his family moved to the Province of North Carolina in 1770. Raised in a family of farmers, Turner served in the North Carolina volunteer militia during the American Revolutionary War in 1780. He served under Nathanael Greene alongside Nathaniel Macon, with whom he formed a lasting friendship and political alliance.

== Politics ==
In 1798, Turner was elected to the North Carolina House of Commons; he served there from 1799 to 1800, and served in the North Carolina Senate from 1801 to 1802.

=== Governor ===
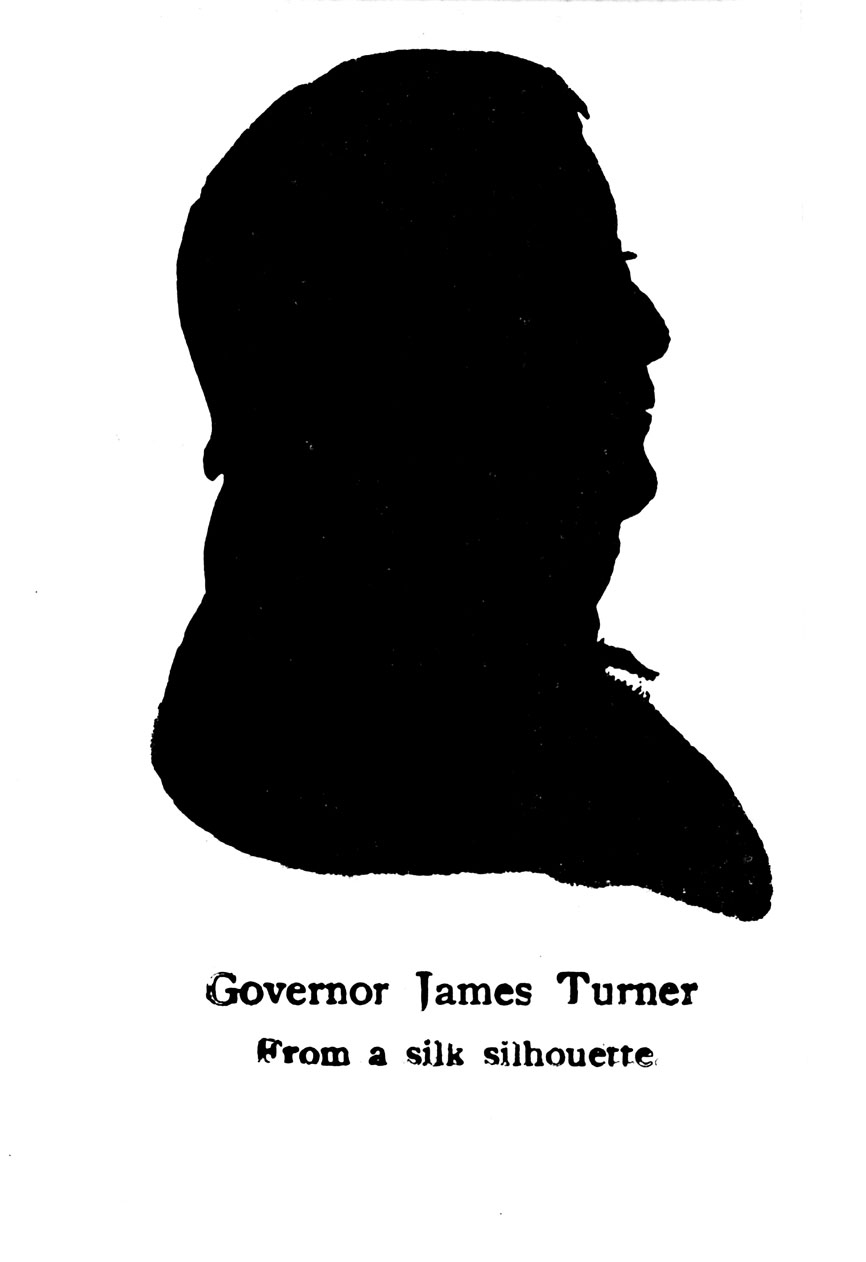
Silhouette of Turner

In 1802, the General Assembly elected John Baptista Ashe governor. Death preceding his assumption of office, Turner was chosen in his place and sworn in on December 5, 1802. He served the constitutional limit of three one-year terms and, at the end of his time as governor, was elected to the United States Senate upon Montfort Stokes' resignation before serving his full term of office.

=== U.S. Senate ===
Turner served as a senator for eleven years, re-elected to a second term in 1811, resigning due to ill health in 1816. During his time in office, he supported the administration of James Madison during the War of 1812. Around 1805, he introduced to the Senate a bill outlawing the importation of slaves.

== Personal life, death, legacy ==
Turner was married three times; first to Marian Anderson in 1793 (they had four children), then to Ann Cochran in 1802, with no children, and finally to Elizabeth Johnston in 1810 (resulting in two children). Turner died in 1824 and is interred on his "Bloomsbury" plantation in Warren County. In addition to Bloomsbury, he owned a second home, "Oakland," in present-day Vance County.

His son Daniel Turner served in the US House of Representatives from 1827 to 1829.

== Sources ==
- Biographical Directory of the Governors of the United States, 1789–1978, Robert Sobel and John Raimo, eds. Westport, CT: Meckler Books, 1978. (ISBN 0-930466-00-4)
- North Carolina Historical Marker James Moody Turner
- Charles L. Coon, The Beginnings of Public Education in North Carolina: A Documentary History, 1790–1840 (1908)
- Delbert H. Gilpatrick, Jeffersonian Democracy in North Carolina, 1789–1816 (1931)
- William S. Powell, ed., Dictionary of North Carolina Biography, VI, 65—sketch by Roy Parker Jr.

Political offices
Preceded by John Ashe; Elect	Governor of North Carolina; 1802–1805	Succeeded by Nathaniel Alexander
U.S. Senate
Preceded by Jesse Franklin	U.S. senator (Class 2) from North Carolina; 1805–1816; Served alongside: David Stone, Jesse Franklin, David Stone, Francis Locke, Jr., Nathaniel Macon	Succeeded by Montfort Stokes
