= John Baptist Ashe =

American politician (1748–1802)

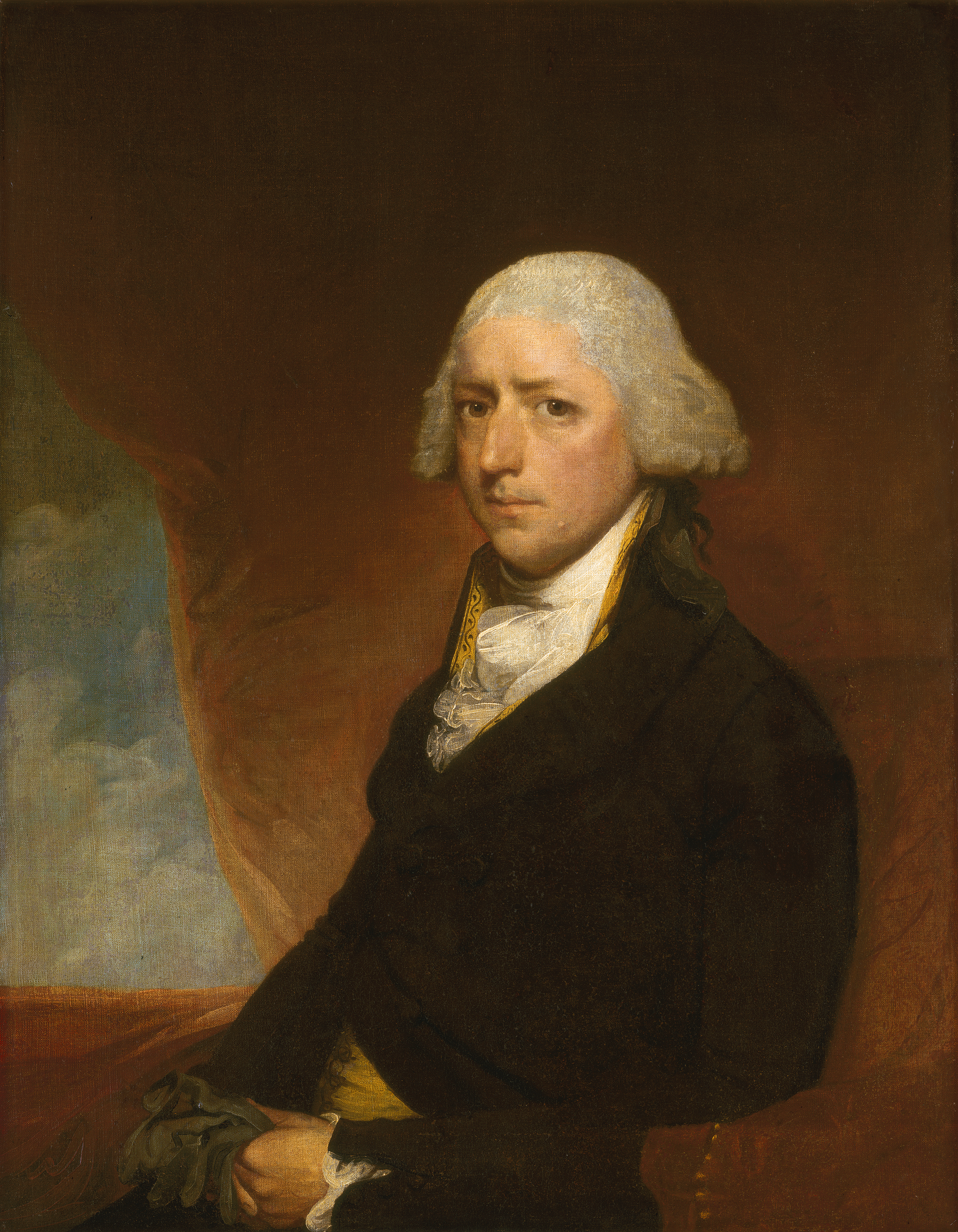
- portrait by Gilbert Stuart

Governor-elect of North Carolina
- Died before assuming office
- Preceded by: Benjamin Williams
- Succeeded by: James Turner

Member of the U.S. House of Representatives from North Carolina's 3rd district
- In office March 4, 1791 – March 3, 1793
- Preceded by: Timothy Bloodworth
- Succeeded by: Joseph Winston

Member of the U.S. House of Representatives from North Carolina's 1st district
- In office March 24, 1790 – March 4, 1791
- Preceded by: Constituency established
- Succeeded by: John Steele

Personal details
- Born: John Baptista Ashe; 1748 Rocky Point, North Carolina, British America
- Died: November 27, 1802 (aged 53–54) Halifax, North Carolina, U.S.
- Party: Anti-Administration (before 1792); Democratic-Republican (1792–1802)
- Spouse: Elizabeth Montfort
- Children: 1
- Relatives: John Ashe (brother)

Military service
- Allegiance: United States
- Branch/service: North Carolina militia
- Rank: Lieutenant Colonel
- Unit: New Hanover County Militia; Salisbury District Minuteman; 6th North Carolina Regiment; 1st North Carolina Regiment
- Commands: Majors Company, 6th North Carolina Regiment
- Battles/wars: American Revolutionary War • Battle of Brandywine • Battle of Germantown • Battle of Monmouth

John Baptist Ashe (1748 – November 27, 1802) was an American politician and military officer from Halifax, North Carolina.

== Biography ==
He was born in the Rocky Point District of the Province of North Carolina in 1748. He was the son of Samuel Ashe and Mary Porter Ashe (cousin to her husband and first wife). His father's residence was called the Neck and was on the northeast Cape Fear River. His father was to be governor of the state and also brother of North Carolina militia General John Ashe. He was originally named "John Baptista Ashe", in honor of his grandfather, but chose to drop the final "a" from his middle name.

=== Military service ===
He served as a lieutenant in the province of North Carolina New Hanover County militia during the time of the Regulator uprising in 1771. Later, during the American Revolutionary War, he served as a minuteman in the Salisbury District, and the 6th North Carolina Regiment of the North Carolina Line (Continental Army), leading the "Majors" company. He fought at the Battle of Moore's Creek Bridge on February 27, 1776, after which the minutemen battalions were disbanded in favor of local militia and the Continental Army. He joined the 6th North Carolina Regiment as a captain and later promoted to major and then lieutenant colonel. He was at Valley Forge and fought at the Battle of Brandywine Creek in Pennsylvania on September 11, 1777; Battle of Germantown in Pennsylvania on October 4, 1777; and Battle of Monmouth in New Jersey on June 28, 1778.

=== Political career ===
He served in the Province of North Carolina House of Burgesses in 1775. Ashe was elected to the North Carolina House of Commons (1784–1786) and served as Speaker of that body in 1786. He was a delegate to the Congress of the Confederation in 1787. In 1789, Ashe was a delegate and Chairman of the Committee of the whole of the Fayetteville Convention that ratified the Constitution of the United States. That same year, he served in the North Carolina Senate.

Ashe was elected to the 1st United States Congress and the 2nd United States Congress as an "Anti-Administration" (what became Anti-Federalist or Democratic-Republican) candidate, serving from 1790 to 1793. He was a candidate in the 1792 North Carolina gubernatorial election, finishing 3rd. Prior to his successful election as governor in 1802, he was also a candidate for governor in 1800 and 1801.

In 1802, the North Carolina General Assembly elected Ashe Governor, but he died before he could take office. He is buried in Halifax.

=== Family ===
On October 7, 1779, he married Elizabeth Montfort. They lived on the outskirts of Halifax, North Carolina. They had one child, Samuel Porter Ashe, born on July 17, 1791.

His namesake and nephew, John Baptista Ashe, served in Congress as a Representative from Tennessee.

U.S. House of Representatives
New constituency	Member of the U.S. House of Representatives from North Carolina's 1st congressional district 1790–1791	Succeeded by John Steele
Preceded by Timothy Bloodworth	Member of the U.S. House of Representatives from North Carolina's 3rd congressional district 1791–1793	Succeeded by Joseph Winston
Political offices
Preceded by Benjamin Williams	Governor-elect of North Carolina; 1802	Succeeded by James Turner
