= 1805 Rhode Island gubernatorial election =

- April 3, 1805
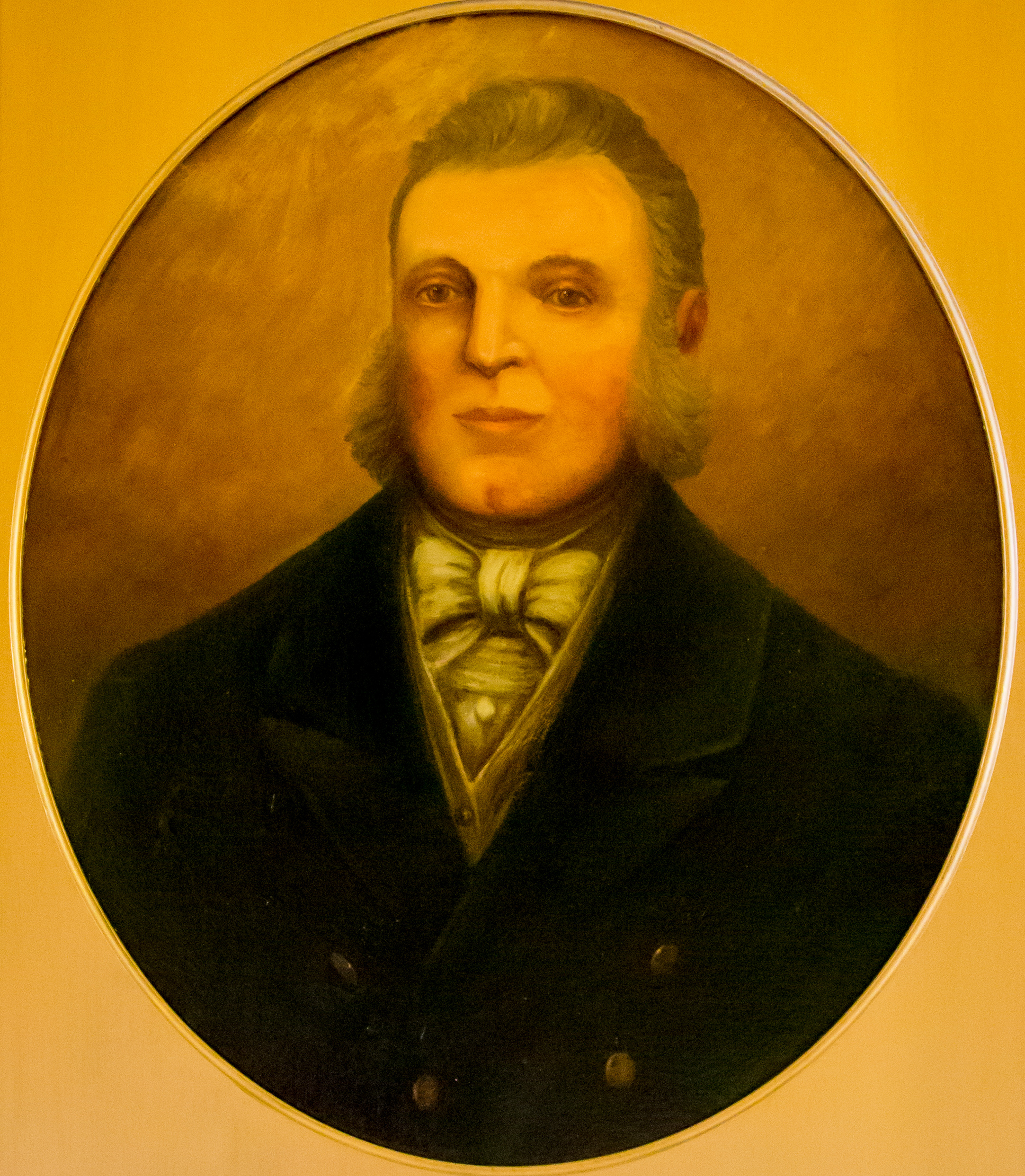

Nominee	Arthur Fenner	Seth Wheaton
Party	Democratic-Republican	Federalist
Percentage	Unknown	Unknown
- County results Fenner: 90–100%
Governor before election
Arthur Fenner
Democratic-Republican
Elected Governor
Arthur Fenner
Democratic-Republican

The 1805 Rhode Island gubernatorial election was held on April 3, 1805, in order to elect the governor of Rhode Island. Incumbent Democratic-Republican governor Arthur Fenner won re-election against Federalist nominee Seth Wheaton. The exact number of votes cast in this election are unknown.

== General election ==
On election day, April 3, 1805, incumbent Democratic-Republican governor Arthur Fenner won re-election against his opponent Federalist nominee Seth Wheaton, thereby retaining Democratic-Republican control over the office of governor. Fenner was sworn in for his sixteenth term on May 5, 1805.

=== Results ===
Rhode Island gubernatorial election, 1805
Party	Candidate	Votes	%
Democratic-Republican	Arthur Fenner (incumbent)		
Federalist	Seth Wheaton		
Total votes			100.00
Democratic-Republican hold			
