= Benjamin Williams =

American politician (1751–1814)

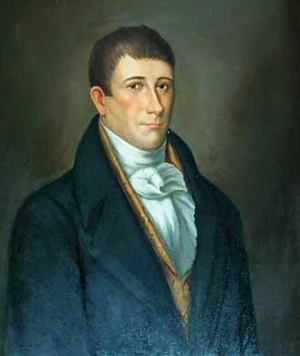

11th and 14th Governor of North Carolina
- In office December 1, 1807 – December 12, 1808
- Preceded by: Nathaniel Alexander
- Succeeded by: David Stone
- In office November 23, 1799 – December 6, 1802
- Preceded by: William Richardson Davie
- Succeeded by: John Ashe (Elect)

Member of the U.S. House of Representatives from North Carolina's 10th district
- In office March 4, 1793 – March 3, 1795
- Preceded by: District created
- Succeeded by: Nathan Bryan

Member of the North Carolina Senate
- In office 1780, 1781, 1784, 1786, 1788, 1807, 1809

Member of the North Carolina House of Commons
- In office 1779, 1785, 1789

Personal details
- Born: January 1, 1751 Johnston County, Province of North Carolina, British America
- Died: July 20, 1814 (aged 63) Moore County, North Carolina, U.S.
- Party: Federalist

Benjamin Williams (January 1, 1751 – July 20, 1814) was the 11th and 14th governor of the U.S. state of North Carolina, from 1799 to 1802 and from 1807 to 1808. He was the first of two North Carolina governors since the American Revolution to serve nonconsecutive terms.

== Biography ==
Williams was born in Johnston County, North Carolina, in 1751, and became a farmer. He married Elizabeth Jones on August 10, 1781; they had one son named Benjamin. Williams was a Mason and was a member of St. John's Lodge in New Bern.

Williams served as a member of the revolutionary convention in Johnston County in 1774; he then served in the North Carolina Provincial Congress and two terms in the Provincial Council. In 1775, Williams was appointed to the Second North Carolina Regiment; he served until 1781, was promoted to the rank of colonel, and fought at the Battle of Guilford Courthouse. He also served in the Province of North Carolina House of Burgesses in 1775.

Military service:

- Lieutenant in the 2nd North Carolina Regiment (1775-1776)
- Captain in the 2nd North Carolina Regiment (1776-1779)
- Lt. Colonel or Colonel in the Johnston County Regiment of North Carolina militia (1780-1781)
- Lt. Colonel or Colonel over the North Carolina State Regiment (State Troops) (1781)

Williams served in both houses of the North Carolina General Assembly over the next three decades, one term in the United States House of Representatives from 1793 to 1795, and four annual terms as Governor. He was a candidate in the 1792 North Carolina gubernatorial election, finishing 4th. He was first elected as governor in 1799 to fill the unexpired term of William R. Davie, who had resigned. Williams was elected twice more and served for three years. During his last year in office he pardoned Congressman John Stanly, who had killed former Gov. Richard Dobbs Spaight in a duel.

The North Carolina Constitution of 1776 limited the post of governor to three one-year terms within a six year period. After three years had passed, Williams sought re-election to the position in 1805 but was defeated by Nathaniel Alexander. In 1807, the General Assembly elected him governor once again, but in 1808 they elected David Stone, ending Williams' gubernatorial career. Williams was elected one last time to the North Carolina Senate in 1809, then retired from politics.

Williams died in 1814 and is buried in Moore County. His home called House in the Horseshoe, is a tourist attraction operated by the North Carolina Department of Cultural Resources.

U.S. House of Representatives
Preceded by District created	Member of the U.S. House of Representatives from North Carolina's 10th congressional district 1793–1795	Succeeded by Nathan Bryan
Political offices
Preceded by William R. Davie	Governor of North Carolina; 1799–1802	Succeeded by John Ashe; Elect
Preceded by Nathaniel Alexander	Governor of North Carolina; 1807–1808	Succeeded by David Stone
