= Nathaniel Alexander (American politician) =

American physician and politician (1756–1808)

13th Governor of North Carolina
- In office December 10, 1805 – December 1, 1807
- Preceded by: James Turner
- Succeeded by: Benjamin Williams

Member of the U.S. House of Representatives from North Carolina's 10th district
- In office March 4, 1803 – November 1805
- Preceded by: John Stanly
- Succeeded by: Evan S. Alexander

Member of the North Carolina House of Commons
- In office 1797

Member of the North Carolina State Senate
- In office 1801–1802

Personal details
- Born: March 5, 1756 Anson County, Province of North Carolina, British America (near modern-day Concord, North Carolina)
- Died: March 7, 1808 (aged 52) Salisbury, North Carolina, U.S.
- Party: Democratic-Republican

Nathaniel Alexander (March 5, 1756 – March 7, 1808) was an American physician and politician who served as the 13th governor of the U.S. state of North Carolina from 1805 to 1807.

== Biography ==
Alexander was born in 1756, in what was at the time known as Anson County in the Province of North Carolina (his birthplace is located near the modern city of Concord). He was the son of a local sheriff. He earned a bachelor's degree from the College of New Jersey (now Princeton University) in 1776 and was commissioned as a surgeon in the North Carolina Line in 1779. He served through the American Revolutionary War until 1782, and then practiced medicine for a time near Santee, South Carolina. He was distinguished as a politician but also as a physician, with Toner stating that he was a "physician of eminence in Mecklenburg."

Returning to his native North Carolina, Alexander was elected to the North Carolina House of Commons in 1797, to the North Carolina Senate in 1801, and to the United States House of Representatives in 1803.

On November 25, 1805, Alexander was elected governor by the North Carolina General Assembly and served two one-year terms in that office, declining to run for a third. Although a Democratic-Republican, he enjoyed support from the Federalists as well. As governor, he oversaw the resolution of a boundary dispute with Georgia, the expansion of the state's district courts, and the growth of the state's educational system. While governor, he was also president of The University of North Carolina Board of Trustees. Only a few months after stepping down as governor, Alexander died in Salisbury, North Carolina; he is buried in Old Settlers' Cemetery in Charlotte, North Carolina.

He married Margaret Polk, a daughter of a Colonel Thomas Polk, but the couple left no issue.

== Notes ==
U.S. House of Representatives
Preceded by John Stanly	Member of the U.S. House of Representatives from North Carolina's 10th congressional district 1803–1805	Succeeded by Evan S. Alexander
Political offices
Preceded by James Turner	Governor of North Carolina; 1805–1807	Succeeded by Benjamin Williams
