= List of elections in 1801 =

The following elections occurred in 1801:

== North America ==
=== United States ===
==== United States lieutenant gubernatorial ====
- 1801 Connecticut lieutenant gubernatorial election

==== United States gubernatorial ====
- 1801 Connecticut gubernatorial election
- 1801 Georgia gubernatorial election
- 1801 Maryland gubernatorial election
- 1801 Massachusetts gubernatorial election
- 1801 New Hampshire gubernatorial election
- 1801 New Jersey gubernatorial election
- 1801 New York gubernatorial election
- 1801 North Carolina gubernatorial election
- 1801 Rhode Island gubernatorial election
- 1801 Tennessee gubernatorial election
- 1801 Vermont gubernatorial election
- 1801 Virginia gubernatorial election

==== United States Senate ====
- 1800 and 1801 United States Senate elections
- United States Senate election in New York, 1801
- 1801 United States Senate election in Pennsylvania
- 1801 United States Senate special election in Pennsylvania

==== United States House of Representatives ====
- 1800–01 United States House of Representatives elections
- 1801 Connecticut's at-large congressional district special election
- 1801 Georgia's at-large congressional district special election
- 1801 United States House of Representatives elections in Kentucky
- 1801 Maryland's 3rd congressional district special election
- 1801 Maryland's 5th congressional district special election
- 1801 Massachusetts's 4th congressional district special election
- 1801–02 Massachusetts's 12th congressional district special election
- 1801 Massachusetts's 14th congressional district special election
- 1801 New York's 6th congressional district special election
- 1801 United States House of Representatives elections in North Carolina
- 1801 North Carolina's 8th congressional district special election
- 1801 Pennsylvania's 4th congressional district special election
- 1801 Pennsylvania's 8th congressional district special election
- 1801 Pennsylvania's 12th congressional district special election
- 1801 United States House of Representatives elections in Tennessee
- 1801 Tennessee's at-large congressional district special election
- 1801 United States House of Representatives elections in Virginia

== Europe ==
=== United Kingdom ===
- 1801 United Kingdom general election

== See also ==
- Category:1801 elections
