= 1801 United States gubernatorial elections =

- March 10, 1801 – December 11, 1801

13 state governorships
	Majority party	Minority party
Party	Democratic-Republican	Federalist
Last election	7 governorships	9 governorships
Seats before	7	9
Seats won	8	5
Seats after	11	5
Seat change	▲4	▼4
Seats up	4	9
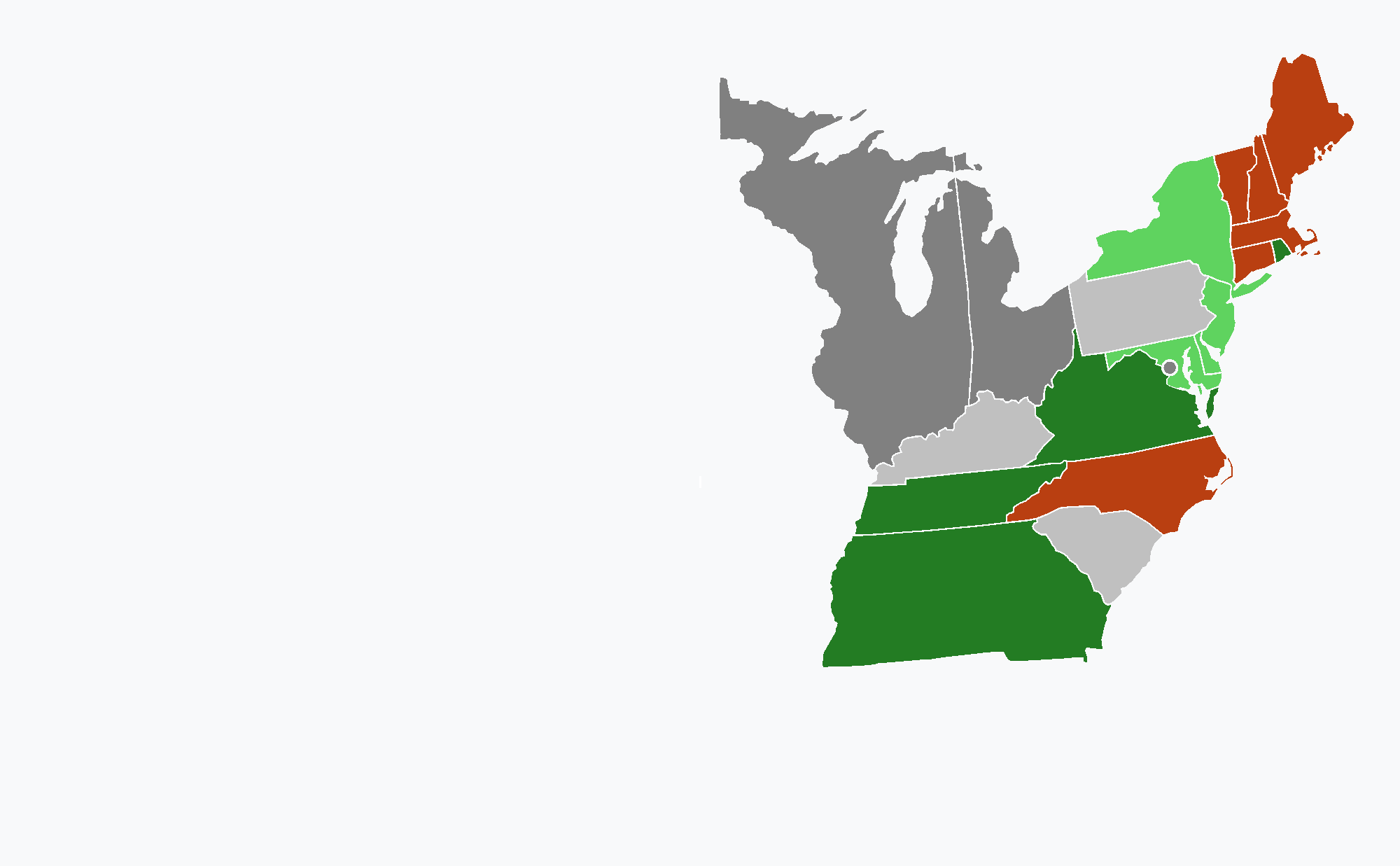
- Democratic-Republican gain Democratic-Republican hold Federalist gain Federalist hold

United States gubernatorial elections were held in 1801, in 13 states.

Eight governors were elected by popular vote and five were elected by state legislatures.

== Results ==
State	Election date	Incumbent	Party	Status	Opposing candidates
Connecticut	April 9, 1801 (Note: Glashan records this election as taking place on April 13.)	Jonathan Trumbull Jr.	Federalist	Re-elected, 11,156 (83.84%)	Richard Law (Democratic-Republican), 1,056 (7.94%); Scattering 1,095 (8.23%)
Delaware	October 6, 1801	James Sykes (acting) (Note: As Speaker of the Delaware Senate, Sykes became acting Governor on the resignation of Governor Richard Bassett on March 3, 1801.)	Federalist	Retired, Democratic-Republican victory	David Hall (Democratic-Republican), 3,475 (50.13%); Nathaniel Mitchell (Federalist), 3,457 (49.87%)
Georgia (election by legislature)	November 5, 1801 (Note: Some sources suggest the election was held on November 7, but this was the date Tattnall was inaugurated.)	David Emanuel (acting) (Note: As President of the Georgia State Senate, Emanuel became acting Governor on the resignation of Governor James Jackson on March 3, 1801.)	Democratic-Republican	Retired, Democratic-Republican victory	Josiah Tattnall (Democratic-Republican), 41 votes Thomas P. Carnes (Federalist), 21 votes Jared Irwin (Democratic-Republican), 7 votes
Maryland (election by legislature)	November 9, 1801	Benjamin Ogle	Federalist	Term-limited, Democratic-Republican victory	John Francis Mercer (Democratic-Republican), 59 votes James Murray (Federalist), 26 votes (Note: Some contemporary sources give Murray's total as 27. 26 is the figure given in the Maryland Senate Journal.)
Massachusetts	April 6, 1801	Caleb Strong	Federalist	Re-elected, 25,452 (55.55%)	Elbridge Gerry (Democratic-Republican), 20,184 (44.05%) (Note: Some 19th-century sources give Gerry's total as 20,169, and scattering votes as 195.); Scattering 180 (0.39%) (Note: Kallenbach and Kallenbach give the number of scattering votes as 380.)
New Hampshire	March 10, 1801	John Taylor Gilman	Federalist	Re-elected, 10,898 (65.50%)	Timothy Walker (Democratic-Republican), 5,249 (31.55%); Scattering 492 (2.96%)
New Jersey (election by legislature)	October 31, 1801	Richard Howell	Federalist	Retired, Democratic-Republican victory	Joseph Bloomfield (Democratic-Republican), 30 votes Richard Stockton (Federalist), 20 votes
New York	April 28–30, 1801 (Note: Glashan records this election as taking place on April 27–29.)	John Jay	Federalist	Retired, Democratic-Republican victory	George Clinton (Democratic-Republican), 24,808 (54.30%); Stephen van Rensselaer (Federalist), 20,843 (45.62%); Scattering 33 (0.07%)
North Carolina (election by legislature)	November 25, 1801? (Note: Williams acknowledged his election in a letter of 26 November.)	Benjamin Williams	Federalist (Note: Some sources describe Williams as a Democratic-Republican, although Broussard refers to him as "a quiet but unmistakeable Federalist" and "undeniably a Federalist", and Gilpatrick describes him as a "mild Federalist.")	Re-elected, 119 votes	John B. Ashe (Democratic-Republican) 58 votes Richard Dobbs Spaight (Democratic-Republican), 1 vote
Rhode Island	April 1, 1801 (Note: Glashan records this election as taking place on April 15.)	Arthur Fenner	Democratic-Republican/Country (Note: Fenner was supported by the Federalist Party.)	Re-elected, 3,756 (100.00%) (Note: Dubin and OurCampaigns give Fenner's total as 3,760. This discrepancy involves four additional votes in Bristol County.)	
Tennessee	August 6–7, 1801	John Sevier	Democratic-Republican	Term-limited, Democratic-Republican victory	Archibald Roane (Democratic-Republican), 8,438 (99.88%); John Boyd 10 (0.12%)
Vermont	September 1, 1801	Isaac Tichenor	Federalist	Re-elected, majority of 2,060	Israel Smith (Democratic-Republican)
Virginia (election by legislature)	December 10, 1801	James Monroe	Democratic-Republican	Re-elected, unknown number of votes	Scattering, 3 votes

== See also ==
- 1801 United States elections

== Bibliography ==
- Glashan, Roy R. (1979). American Governors and Gubernatorial Elections, 1775-1978. Westport, CT: Meckler Books. ISBN 0-930466-17-9.
- Gubernatorial Elections, 1787-1997. Washington, D.C.: Congressional Quarterly Inc. 1998. ISBN 1-56802-396-0.
- Dubin, Michael J. (2003). United States Gubernatorial Elections, 1776-1860: The Official Results by State and County. Jefferson, North Carolina: McFarland. ISBN 978-0-7864-1439-0.
- Kallenbach, Joseph E.; Kallenbach, Jessamine S., eds. (1977). American State Governors, 1776-1976. Vol. I. Dobbs Ferry, N.Y.: Oceana Publications, Inc. ISBN 0-379-00665-0.
- Broussard, James H. (1978). The Southern Federalists, 1800-1816. Baton Rouge: Louisiana State University Press. ISBN 0-8071-0288-1.
