= List of elections in 1803 =

Elections in 1803

The following elections were held in the year 1803.

== North America ==
=== United States ===
==== United States lieutenant gubernatorial ====
- 1803 Connecticut lieutenant gubernatorial election

==== United States gubernatorial ====
- 1803 Connecticut gubernatorial election
- 1803 Georgia gubernatorial election
- 1803 Maryland gubernatorial election
- 1803 Massachusetts gubernatorial election
- 1803 New Hampshire gubernatorial election
- 1803 New Jersey gubernatorial election
- 1803 North Carolina gubernatorial election
- 1803 Rhode Island gubernatorial election
- 1803 Tennessee gubernatorial election
- 1803 United States gubernatorial elections
- 1803 Vermont gubernatorial election
- 1803 Virginia gubernatorial election

==== United States Senate ====
- 1802 and 1803 United States Senate elections
- 1803 United States Senate election in Massachusetts

==== United States House of Representatives ====
- 1802–03 United States House of Representatives elections
- 1803 Connecticut's at-large congressional district special election
- 1803 Georgia's at-large congressional district special election
- 1803 United States House of Representatives elections in Kentucky
- 1803 United States House of Representatives elections in Maryland
- 1803 Maryland's 6th congressional district special election
- 1803 Massachusetts's 1st congressional district special election
- 1803 Massachusetts's 3rd congressional district special election
- 1803 Massachusetts's 12th congressional district special election
- 1803 United States House of Representatives election in New Jersey
- 1803 New York's 6th congressional district special election
- 1803 New York's 7th congressional district special election
- 1803 United States House of Representatives elections in North Carolina
- 1803 United States House of Representatives election in Ohio
- 1803 United States House of Representatives elections in South Carolina
- 1803 United States House of Representatives elections in Tennessee
- 1802–1803 United States House of Representatives elections in Vermont
- 1803 United States House of Representatives elections in Virginia
- 1803 Virginia's 7th congressional district special election

== Europe ==
=== United Kingdom ===
- 1803 Gatton by-election

== See also ==
- Category:1803 elections
