= 1803 United States gubernatorial elections =

- January 11, 1803 – December 19, 1803

12 state governorships
	Majority party	Minority party
Party	Democratic-Republican	Federalist
Last election	12 governorships	4 governorships
Seats before	12	4
Seats won	9	4
Seats after	13	4
Seat change	▲1	Steady
Seats up	8	4
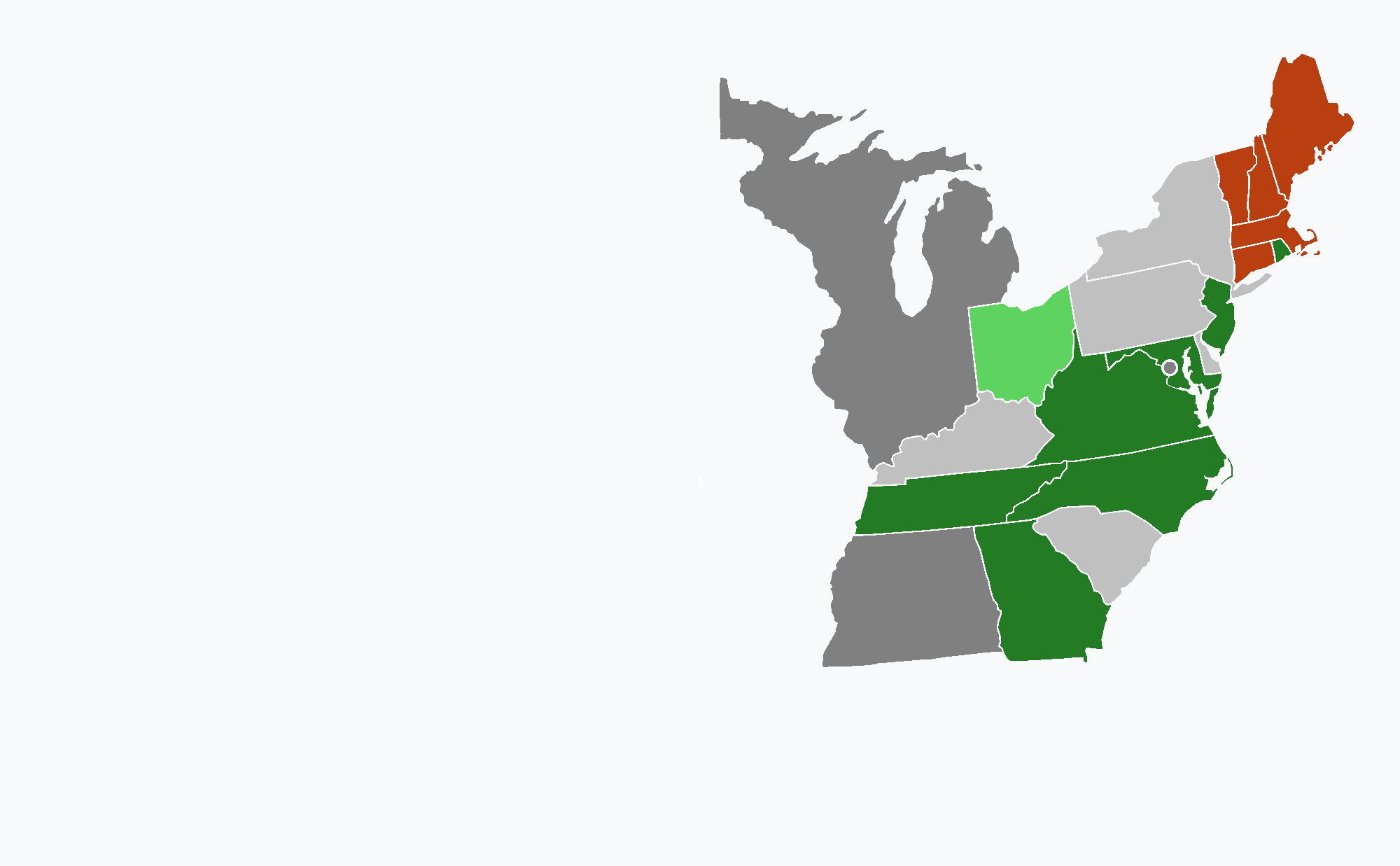
- Democratic-Republican gain Democratic-Republican hold Federalist gain Federalist hold

United States gubernatorial elections were held in 1803, in 12 states.

Seven governors were elected by popular vote and five were elected by state legislatures.

Ohio held its first gubernatorial election on achieving statehood.

== Results ==
State	Election date	Incumbent	Party	Status	Opposing candidates
Connecticut	14 April 1803 (Note: Glashan records this election as taking place on 11 April.)	Jonathan Trumbull Jr.	Federalist	Re-elected, 14,375 (64.04%)	Ephraim Kirby (Democratic-Republican), 7,848 (34.96%); Scattering 223 (0.99%)
Georgia (election by legislature)	10 November 1803	John Milledge	Democratic-Republican	Re-elected, 65 votes	Solomon Wood, 6 votes
Maryland (election by legislature)	14 November 1803	John Francis Mercer	Democratic-Republican	Retired, Democratic-Republican victory	Robert Bowie (Democratic-Republican), 75 votes Thomas Johnson (Federalist), 5 votes Levin Winder (Federalist), 1 vote
Massachusetts	4 April 1803 (Note: One contemporary source states that the election was held on 5 April.)	Caleb Strong	Federalist	Re-elected, 29,199 (67.27%)	Elbridge Gerry (Democratic-Republican), 13,910 (32.05%) (Note: Some 19th Century sources give Gerry's total as 11,656, and scattering votes as 2,554.); Scattering 298 (0.69%)
New Hampshire	8 March 1803	John Taylor Gilman	Federalist	Re-elected, 12,263 (57.53%)	John Langdon (Democratic-Republican), 9,011 (42.27%); Scattering 43 (0.20%)
New Jersey (election by legislature)	27 October 1803	John Lambert (acting) (Note: The 1802 election was deadlocked, with the legislature unable to pick a candidate, giving up on November 25, 1802. Lambert, as vice-president of the Legislative Council, acted as governor until the next election.)	Democratic-Republican	Retired, Democratic-Republican victory	Joseph Bloomfield (Democratic-Republican), 33 votes Richard Stockton (Federalist), 17 votes
North Carolina (election by legislature)	28 November 1803	James Turner	Democratic-Republican	Re-elected, unknown number of votes	Scattering, 2 votes
Ohio	11 January 1803	New state			Edward Tiffin (Democratic-Republican), 5,377 (90.43%) (Note: Glashan gives Tiffin's total as 5,373. This discrepancy appears to involve four votes given for "Edwin Tiffin" and "Tiffin" in Washington County. OurCampaigns gives Tiffin's total as 5,379. This discrepancy appears to involve a double-counting of the difference between reports giving 452 votes and 454 votes for Tiffin in Belmont County.) (Note: A number of sources record that in the General Assembly, Tiffin was recorded as having 4,564 votes and no opposition. This result can be achieved by setting aside the results from Fairfield County and Washington County.); Benjamin Ives Gilman (Federalist), 246 (4.14%); Arthur St. Clair (Federalist), 234 (3.93%); Bezaleel Wells (Federalist), 89 (1.50%); Scattering, unknown (Note: 18 scattering votes were recorded in Washington County, and 3 in Ross County. In addition, “a few” scattering votes were recorded in Belmont County, and 20 persons other than Tiffin and Gilman received votes in Hamilton County.)
Rhode Island	20 April 1803	Arthur Fenner	Democratic-Republican/Country	Re-elected. Returns lost.	
Tennessee	4–5 August 1803	Archibald Roane	Democratic-Republican	Defeated, 4,923 (42.07%) (Note: Returns incomplete. Returns recorded from only nine counties.) (Note: Glashan records the result as Sevier 7,733, Roane, 5,219, and that returns were recorded from ten counties. It is unclear which is the additional county.)	John Sevier (Democratic-Republican), 6,780 (57.93%) (Note: Some sources give Sevier's total as 6,786.)
Vermont	6 September 1803	Isaac Tichenor	Federalist	Re-elected, 7,940 (57.98%) (Note: Some sources do not give a full result but only report that Tichenor had a majority of 2,186. This is the excess of Tichenor's vote over the combined total for Robinson and scattering votes.)	Jonathan Robinson (Democratic-Republican), 5,408 (39.49%); Scattering 346 (2.53%)
Virginia (election by legislature)	19 December 1803	John Page	Democratic-Republican	Re-elected, unanimously	

== See also ==
- 1803 United States elections

== Bibliography ==
- Glashan, Roy R. (1979). American Governors and Gubernatorial Elections, 1775-1978. Westport, CT: Meckler Books. ISBN 0-930466-17-9.
- Gubernatorial Elections, 1787-1997. Washington, D.C.: Congressional Quarterly Inc. 1998. ISBN 1-56802-396-0.
- Dubin, Michael J. (2003). United States Gubernatorial Elections, 1776-1860: The Official Results by State and County. Jefferson, North Carolina: McFarland. ISBN 978-0-7864-1439-0.
- Kallenbach, Joseph E.; Kallenbach, Jessamine S., eds. (1977). American State Governors, 1776-1976. Vol. I. Dobbs Ferry, N.Y.: Oceana Publications, Inc. ISBN 0-379-00665-0.
