= 1802 United States gubernatorial elections =

- March 9, 1802 – December 11, 1802

12 state governorships (including 1 special election)
	Majority party	Minority party
Party	Democratic-Republican	Federalist
Last election	11 governorships	5 governorships
Seats before	11	5
Seats won	8	4
Seats after	12	4
Seat change	▲1	▼1
Seats up	7	5
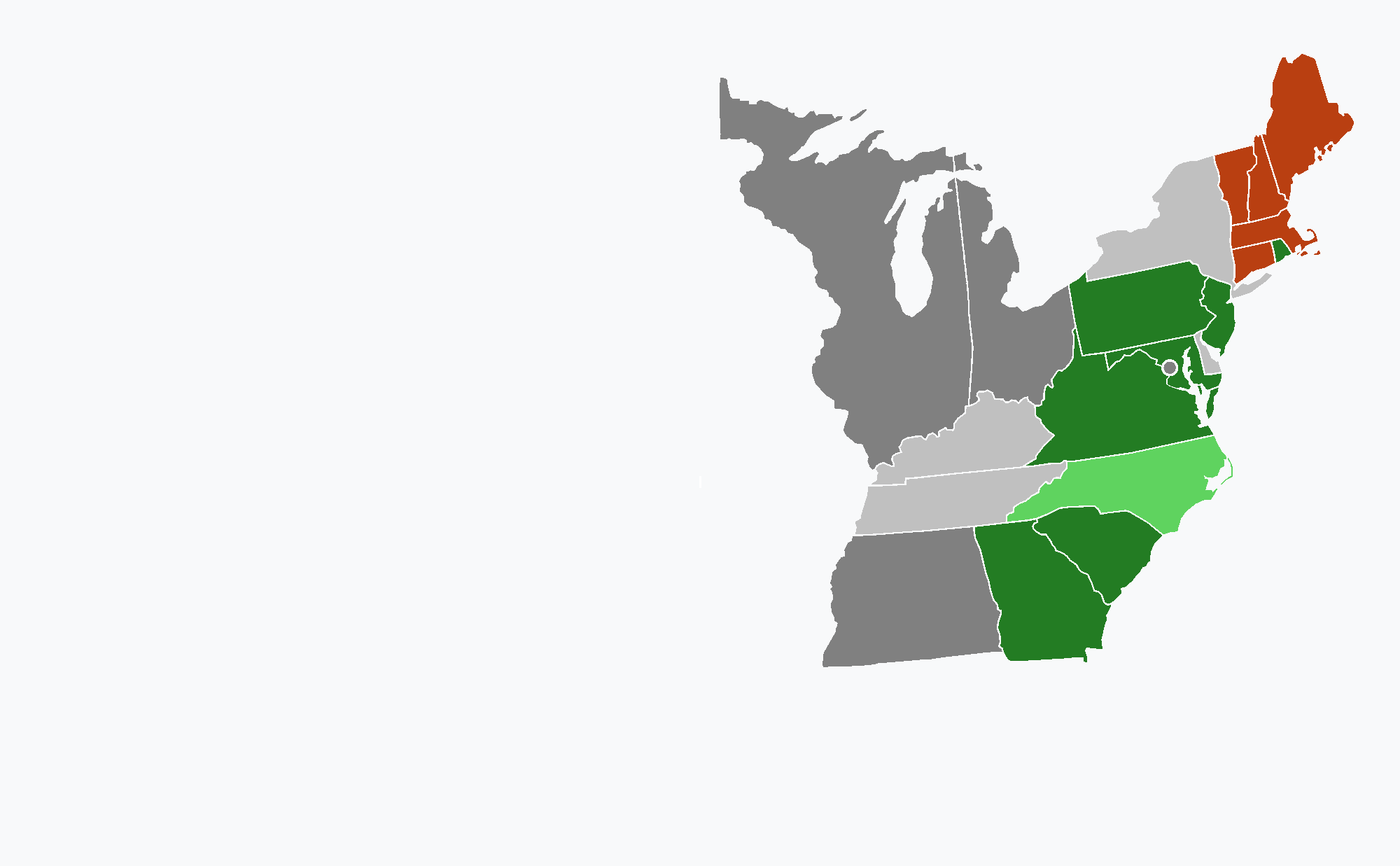
- Democratic-Republican gain Democratic-Republican hold Federalist gain Federalist hold

United States gubernatorial elections were held in 1802, in 12 states, concurrent with the House and Senate elections.

Six governors were elected by popular vote and six were elected by state legislatures.

In Georgia, a special election was held following the resignation of incumbent Governor Josiah Tattnall.

In New Jersey, three tied ballots were taken in October and November, resulting in no choice of Governor. The Vice-President of the Executive Council, John Lambert, served the term as acting Governor.

In North Carolina, the winner of the ordinary election, John B. Ashe, died before taking office. A special election was then held.

== Results ==
State	Election date	Incumbent	Party	Status	Opposing candidates
Connecticut	8 April 1802 (Note: Glashan records this election as taking place on 12 April.)	Jonathan Trumbull Jr.	Federalist	Re-elected, 11,398 (69.87%)	Ephraim Kirby (Democratic-Republican), 4,523 (27.73%); Scattering 393 (2.41%)
Georgia (special election) (election by legislature)	3 November 1802	Josiah Tattnall	Democratic-Republican	Resigned, Democratic-Republican victory	John Milledge (Democratic-Republican), 48 votes Thomas P. Carnes (Federalist), 22 votes
Maryland (election by legislature)	8 November 1802	John Francis Mercer	Democratic-Republican	Re-elected, 53 votes	James Murray (Federalist), 22 votes (Note: Some sources give Murray's total as 21 and/or credit William Vans Murray with one vote. The result given here is that given in the Maryland Senate Journal.)
Massachusetts	5 April 1802	Caleb Strong	Federalist	Re-elected, 29,983 (60.47%)	Elbridge Gerry (Democratic-Republican), 19,445 (39.22%) (Note: A contemporary source gives the combined Gerry and scattering votes as 19,600. The number for Gerry is variously given as 19,443, 19,445, 19,581, and 19,584, and the number scattering as 157, 155, 19, or 16. The result given here is the most likely correct one given the town and county breakdown at A New Nation Votes.); Scattering 155 (0.31%)
New Hampshire	9 March 1802	John Taylor Gilman	Federalist	Re-elected, 10,377 (54.14%)	John Langdon (Democratic-Republican), 8,753 (45.67%); Scattering 36 (0.19%)
New Jersey (election by legislature)	28 October 1802	Joseph Bloomfield	Democratic-Republican	No choice, further election held	(First election); Joseph Bloomfield (Democratic-Republican), 26 votes Richard Stockton (Federalist), 26 votes
New Jersey (election by legislature)	25 November 1802	Joseph Bloomfield	Democratic-Republican	No choice, further election held	(Second election); Joseph Bloomfield (Democratic-Republican), 26 votes Richard Stockton (Federalist), 26 votes
New Jersey (election by legislature)	25 November 1802	Joseph Bloomfield	Democratic-Republican	No choice. Vice-President of the Executive Council, John Lambert, served the term as acting Governor.	(Third election); Joseph Bloomfield (Democratic-Republican), 26 votes Aaron Ogden (Federalist), 26 votes
North Carolina (election by legislature)	20 November 1802	Benjamin Williams	Federalist (Note: Some sources describe Williams as a Democratic-Republican, although Broussard refers to him as "a quiet but unmistakeable Federalist" and "undeniably a Federalist", and Gilpatrick describes him as a "mild Federalist.")	Term-limited, Democratic-Republican victory	John B. Ashe (Democratic-Republican) 103 votes William Polk (Federalist) 49 votes Joseph Taylor (Democratic-Republican), 20 votes (Note: Some sources give Taylor's total as 19. The result given here is that given in the North Carolina Legislative Papers.)
North Carolina (special election) (election by legislature)	3–4 December 1802	Benjamin Williams (pro tempore) (Note: Williams' term was extended until the legislature could elect a replacement for Ashe.)	Federalist	Term-limited, Democratic-Republican victory	(Fourth ballot); James Turner (Democratic-Republican), 112 votes Thomas Blount (Democratic-Republican) 51 votes John R. Eaton (Democratic-Republican), 8 votes Blank, 3 votes Benjamin Williams (Federalist), 2 votes William Richardson Davie (Federalist), 1 vote (Note: Although the various sources agree Turner received 112 votes on the final ballot, they disagree on the full result. The result given here is that given in the North Carolina Legislative Papers.)
Pennsylvania	12 October 1802	Thomas McKean	Democratic-Republican	Re-elected, 47,879 (73.65%)	James Ross (Federalist), 17,037 (26.21%); Scattering 94 (0.15%)
Rhode Island	21 April 1802	Arthur Fenner	Democratic-Republican/Country	Re-elected, 3,802 (66.28%)	William Greene (Note: OurCampaigns records this candidate as James Greene but no other source agrees with this.) (Federalist), 1,934 (33.72%) (Note: A New Nation Votes records an additional scattering vote but no other source agrees with this.)
South Carolina (election by legislature)	8 December 1802	John Drayton	Democratic-Republican	Term-limited, Democratic-Republican victory	James Burchill Richardson (Democratic-Republican), 98 votes Richard Winn (Democratic-Republican), 32 votes Blank, 7 votes Thomas Pinckney (Federalist), 2 votes John Gaillard (Democratic-Republican), 1 vote
Vermont	7 September 1802	Isaac Tichenor	Federalist	Re-elected, 7,823 (59.77%)	Israel Smith (Democratic-Republican), 5,085 (38.85%); Scattering 181 (1.38%)
Virginia (election by legislature)	11 December 1802	James Monroe	Democratic-Republican	Term-limited, Democratic-Republican victory	John Page (Democratic-Republican), unknown number of votes Abraham B. Venable (Democratic-Republican), "a few votes" (Note: Although most sources agree Page was elected "unanimously" or "without opposition", one contemporary source states "There was no opposition. A few votes, however, were given to Mr. Venable.")

== See also ==
- 1802 United States elections

== Bibliography ==
- Glashan, Roy R. (1979). American Governors and Gubernatorial Elections, 1775-1978. Westport, CT: Meckler Books. ISBN 0-930466-17-9.
- Gubernatorial Elections, 1787-1997. Washington, D.C.: Congressional Quarterly Inc. 1998. ISBN 1-56802-396-0.
- Dubin, Michael J. (2003). United States Gubernatorial Elections, 1776-1860: The Official Results by State and County. Jefferson, North Carolina: McFarland. ISBN 978-0-7864-1439-0.
- Kallenbach, Joseph E.; Kallenbach, Jessamine S., eds. (1977). American State Governors, 1776-1976. Vol. I. Dobbs Ferry, N.Y.: Oceana Publications, Inc. ISBN 0-379-00665-0.
- Broussard, James H. (1978). The Southern Federalists, 1800-1816. Baton Rouge: Louisiana State University Press. ISBN 0-8071-0288-1.
