= Governor of Ohio =

Head of government of the U.S. state of Ohio

Governor of the State of Ohio
- Seal of the governor of Ohio

- Standard of the governor of Ohio

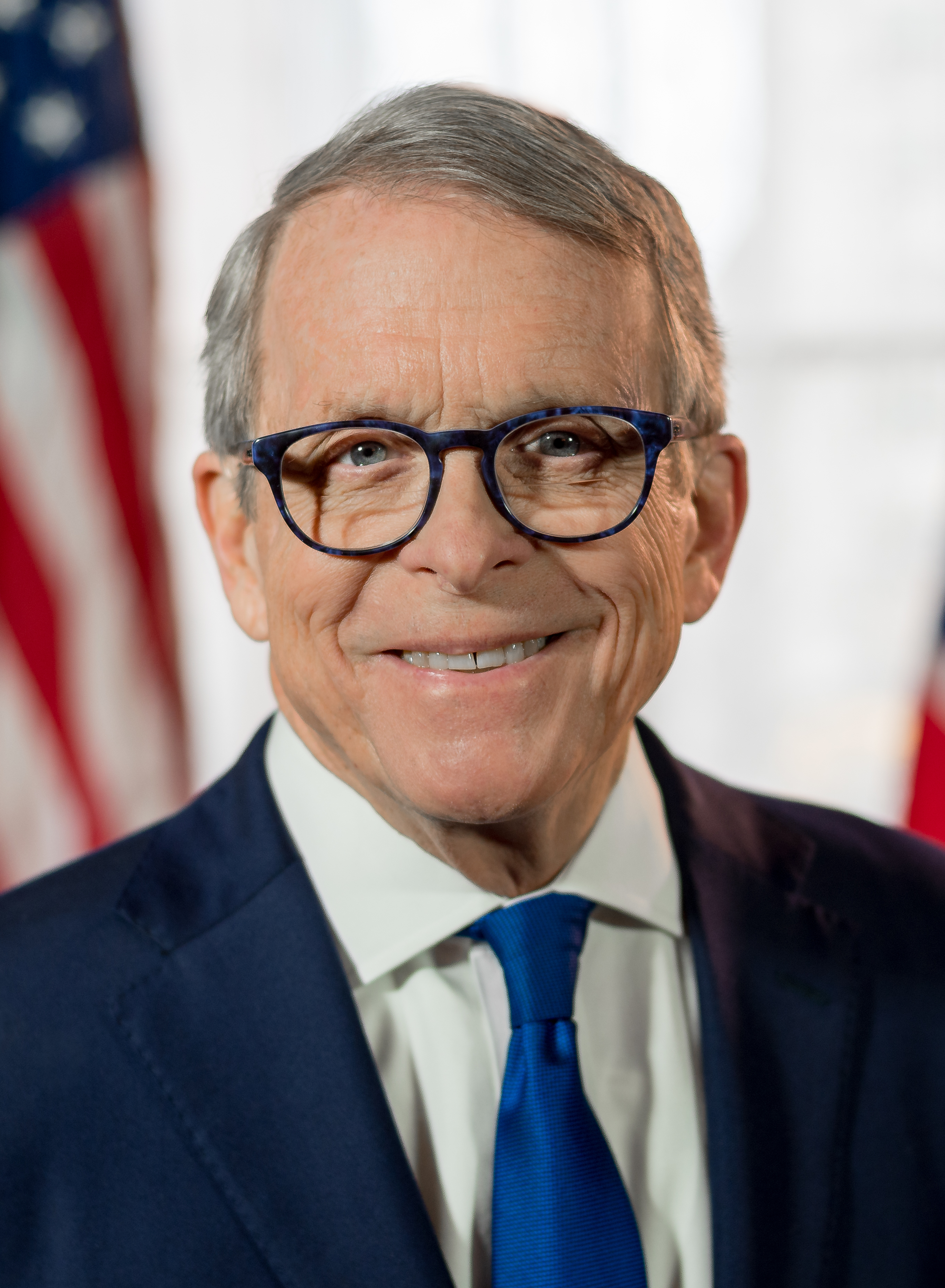
- Incumbent; Mike DeWine since January 14, 2019
- Government of Ohio
- Style: The Honorable
- Residence: Ohio Governor's Mansion
- Seat: Columbus, Ohio
- Term length: Four years, renewable once consecutively
- Precursor: Governor of the Territory Northwest of the River Ohio
- Inaugural holder: Edward Tiffin
- Formation: March 3, 1803
- Succession: Line of succession
- Deputy: Lieutenant Governor of Ohio
- Salary: $171,059 (2023)
- Website: Official website

The governor of Ohio is the head of government of Ohio and the commander-in-chief of the U.S. state's military forces. The governor has a duty to enforce state laws, the power to either approve or veto bills passed by the Ohio General Assembly, the power to convene and adjourn the legislature, and the power to grant pardons, except in cases of treason and impeachment.

The current governor is Mike DeWine, a member of the Republican Party who took office on January 14, 2019.

== History ==
The office of the governor of Ohio was established with the ratification of the constitution of the State of Ohio by Congress on February 19, 1803. It became operational after Edward Tiffin took office on March 3 following the first gubernatorial election. The governor was largely a figurehead under the 1803 constitution, unable to appoint members of the executive branch or veto legislation passed by the General Assembly. This was due in large part to the unpopularity of territorial governor Arthur St. Clair amongst the drafters of the constitution. Opinions of this arrangement of powers soured over the years, and the General Assembly initiated a constitutional convention in response. This resulted in a new constitution which shifted significant executive powers to the governor and created the position of the lieutenant governor. It was approved by voters and came into force on September 1, 1851.

This constitution created the office of the governor in its modern form. The office has been modified numerous times since, expanding the power of the governor in some ways while restricting it in others. The first major amendment to the governorship was the addition of veto power, granted by a 1903 constitutional amendment. Governors have been limited to no more than two four-year terms in succession since a 1954 constitutional amendment was approved by voters. A 1961 constitutional amendment required certain appointments made by the governor to receive advise and consent of the Senate. A 1976 amendment changed the office of governor and lieutenant governor to be elected on a ticket rather than separately.

The first female candidate for the post was Evelyn Francis Snow in 1926, who sought the Republican nomination, but was unsuccessful. The first female governor of Ohio was Nancy Hollister, who served for eleven days between December 31, 1998, and January 11, 1999. The first female governor elected to the position will be Amy Acton, who won the 2026 Ohio gubernatorial election against Republican Vivek Ramaswamy and will assume office on January 11th, 2027.

== Powers ==
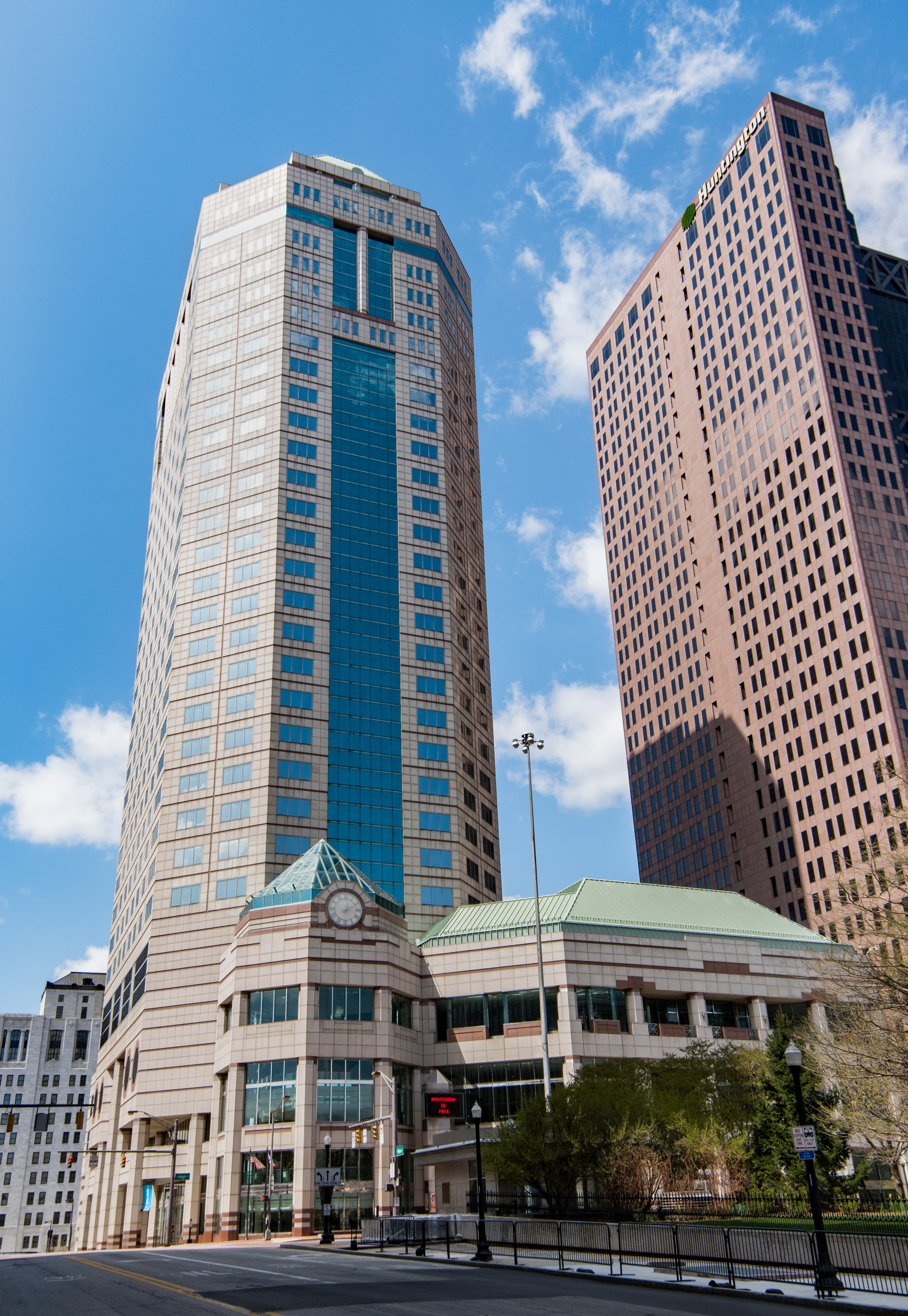
The governor's working office is in the Vern Riffe State Office Tower in Capitol Square.

The governor has a duty to execute state laws, the power to either approve or veto bills passed by the Ohio General Assembly, and the power to grant pardons, except in cases of treason and impeachment. Additionally, the governor is the commander-in-chief of the state's military forces.

Other duties and privileges of the office include:

- Making an annual address to the General Assembly, with recommendation for legislation
- Convening extraordinary sessions of the legislature with limited purposes
- Adjourning the legislature when the two chambers cannot agree to do so themselves, not to include the privilege of adjourning the legislature past the next meeting time set for the regular session
- Drafting and approving a budget proposal to be sent to the General Assembly
- Signing and sealing all judicial commissions granted by the state of Ohio
- Issuing executive orders which direct cabinet agencies on how to operate
- Nominating, in the event of a vacancy in the Lieutenant Governor's office, a new officer, subject to a confirmatory vote of both chambers of the legislature
- Making vacancy appointments for all "key state officers" (the Auditor, the Treasurer, the Secretary of State, and the Attorney General.) Such appointments are for the remainder of the term when the next general election is less than 40 days away and until the next general election otherwise
- Making all appointments not otherwise provided for, with the advice and consent of the Senate, unless the Senate refuses to act, in which case the Governor's appointee takes offices by default
- Sitting on the Ohio Redistricting Commission

== Qualifications ==
To qualify to become governor of Ohio, a candidate must be a qualified elector in the state. This means that any candidate for governor must be at least 18 years old at the time of election, a resident of Ohio, and a U.S. citizen. Convicted felons and those deemed by the courts as incompetent to vote are not eligible.

== Election ==
The governor of Ohio is elected by popular vote to a four-year term, which is renewable once consecutively. There is no limit on amount of terms served non-consecutively. The most recent gubernatorial election took place on November 3, 2026. The next is scheduled to take place on November 5, 2030.

== Succession ==
Should the office of governor become vacant due to death, resignation, or conviction of impeachment, the lieutenant governor assumes the title of governor. After the lieutenant governor, the president of the senate and the speaker of the house would be, respectively, the next two in line to the governorship. If the vacancy of both offices took place during the first twenty months of the term, a special election is to be held on the next even-numbered year to elect new officers to serve out the current term.

== Timeline ==
Timeline of Ohio governors

== See also ==
- List of governors of Ohio
- Ohio General Assembly
- Politics of Ohio
- Supreme Court of Ohio
