= 1802 Georgia gubernatorial special election =

- November 3, 1802
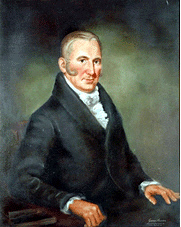

Nominee	John Milledge	Thomas P. Carnes
Party	Democratic-Republican	Federalist
Popular vote	48	22
Percentage	68.57%	31.43%
Governor before election
Josiah Tattnall
Democratic-Republican
Elected Governor
John Milledge
Democratic-Republican

The 1802 Georgia gubernatorial special election was held on November 3, 1802, in order to elect the Governor of Georgia following the resignation of Governor Josiah Tattnall due to declining health. Democratic-Republican candidate and former member of the U.S. House of Representatives from Georgia's at-large congressional district John Milledge defeated Federalist candidate and candidate for Governor in 1801 Thomas P. Carnes in a Georgia General Assembly vote.

== General election ==
On election day, November 3, 1802, Democratic-Republican candidate John Milledge won the election against his opponent Federalist candidate Thomas P. Carnes. Milledge was sworn in as the 26th Governor of Georgia on November 4, 1802.

=== Results ===
Georgia gubernatorial special election, 1802
Party	Candidate	Votes	%
Democratic-Republican	John Milledge	48	68.57
Federalist	Thomas P. Carnes	22	31.43
Total votes		70	100.00
Democratic-Republican hold			
