= 1803 Tennessee gubernatorial election =

- August 4–5, 1803
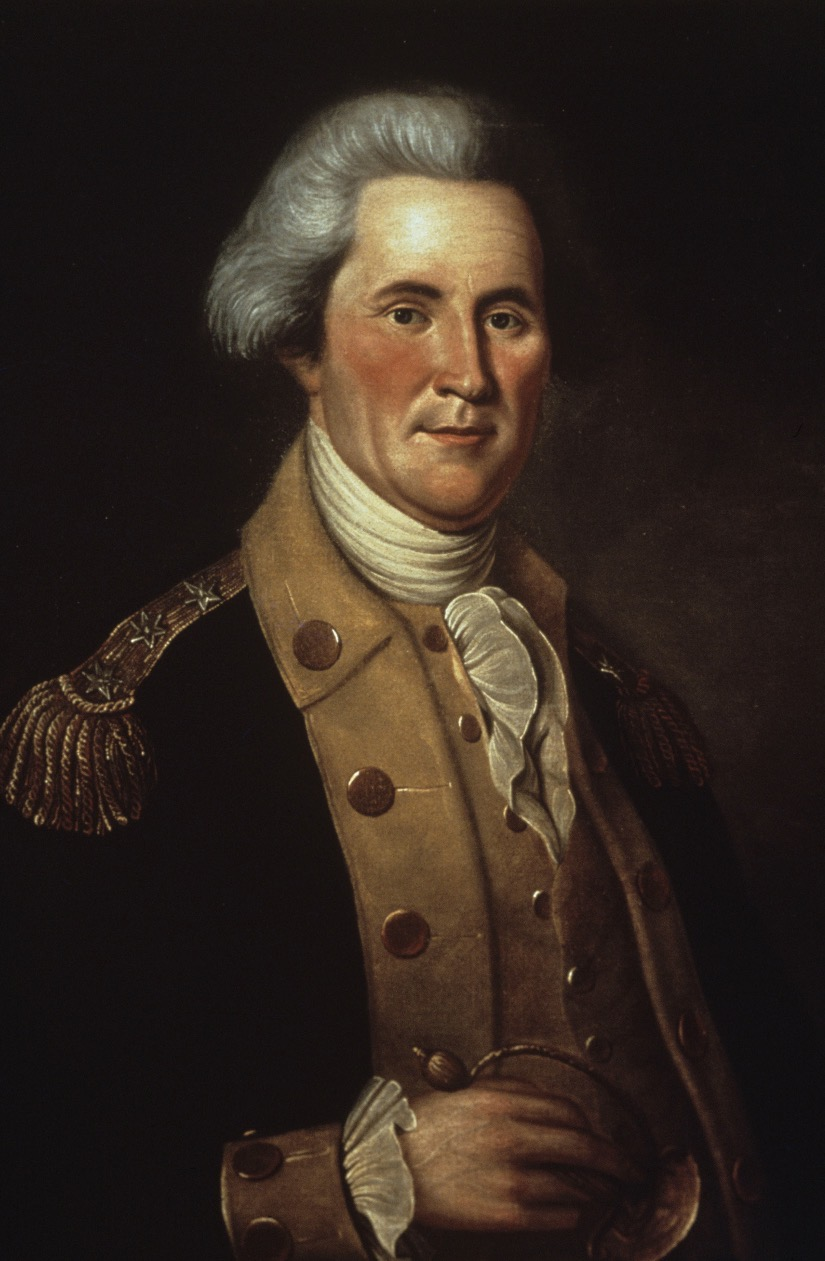

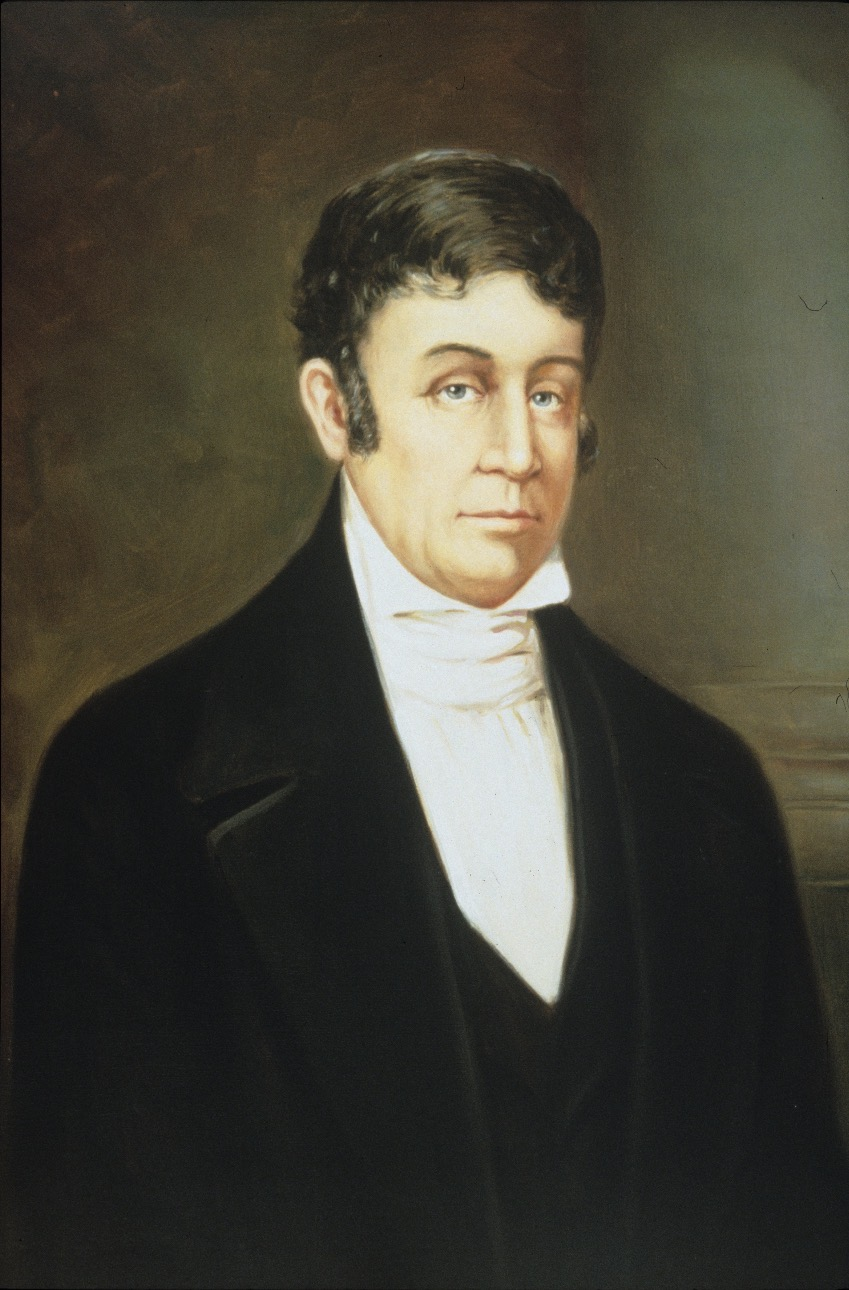
Nominee	John Sevier	Archibald Roane
Party	Democratic-Republican	Democratic-Republican
Popular vote	6,780	4,923
Percentage	57.93%	42.07%
- County results Sevier: 50–60% 60–70% 70–80% 80–90% Roane: 70–80% No data/No votes
Governor before election
Archibald Roane
Democratic-Republican
Elected Governor
John Sevier
Democratic-Republican

The 1803 Tennessee gubernatorial election took place from August 4–5, 1803. In 1801 former governor, John Sevier was forced to leave office as he had reached his three consecutive term limits. In 1803, however, he was qualified to run for re-election and ran against the incumbent governor, Archibald Roane, and defeated him in with 57.93% of the vote.

== Results ==
Tennessee gubernatorial election, 1803
Party	Candidate	Votes	%
Democratic-Republican	John Sevier	6,780	57.93%
Democratic-Republican	Archibald Roane (incumbent)	4,923	42.07%
Total votes		11,703	100.00%

== See also ==
- 1803 United States gubernatorial elections
