= 1802 Maryland gubernatorial election =

- November 8, 1802
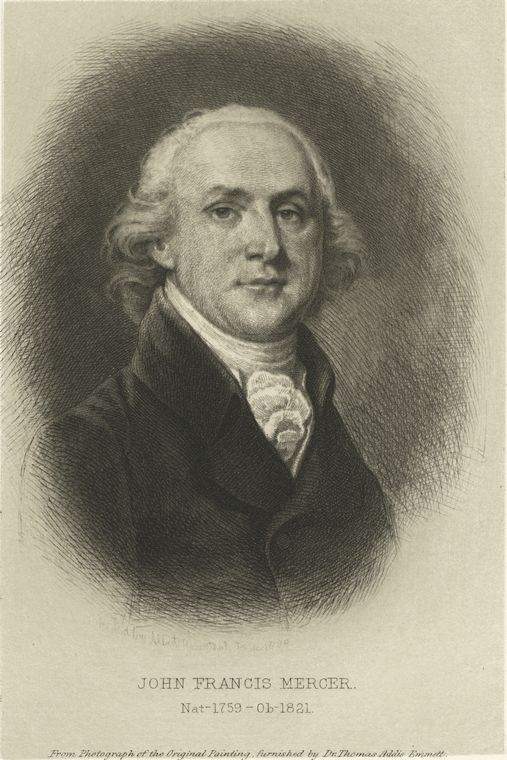

Nominee	John Francis Mercer	James Murray
Party	Democratic-Republican	Federalist
Popular vote	53	22
Percentage	70.67%	29.33%
Governor before election
John Francis Mercer
Democratic-Republican
Elected Governor
John Francis Mercer
Democratic-Republican

The 1802 Maryland gubernatorial election was held on November 8, 1802, in order to elect the governor of Maryland. Incumbent Democratic-Republican governor John Francis Mercer was re-elected by the Maryland General Assembly against his opponent Federalist nominee James Murray in a rematch of the previous election.

== General election ==
On election day, November 8, 1802, incumbent Democratic-Republican governor John Francis Mercer was re-elected by the Maryland General Assembly, thereby retaining Democratic-Republican control over the office of governor. Mercer was sworn in for his second term on November 15, 1802.

=== Results ===
Maryland gubernatorial election, 1802
Party	Candidate	Votes	%
Democratic-Republican	John Francis Mercer (incumbent)	53	70.67
Federalist	James Murray	22	29.33
Total votes		75	100.00
Democratic-Republican hold			
