= 1801 Connecticut lieutenant gubernatorial election =

- April 13, 1801
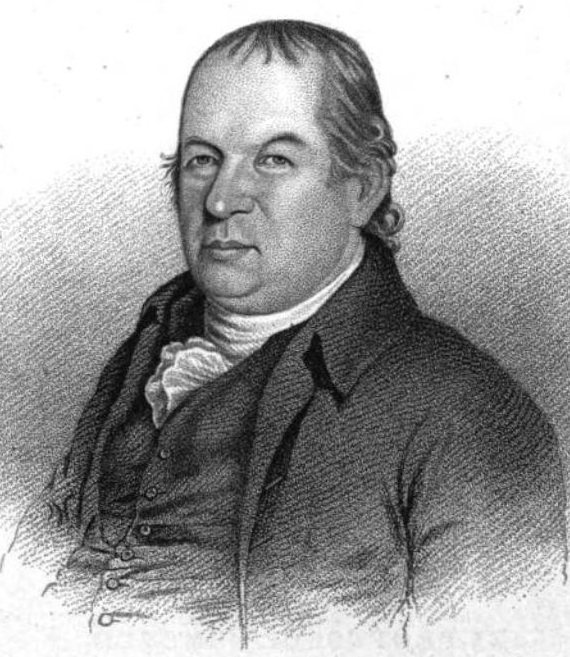

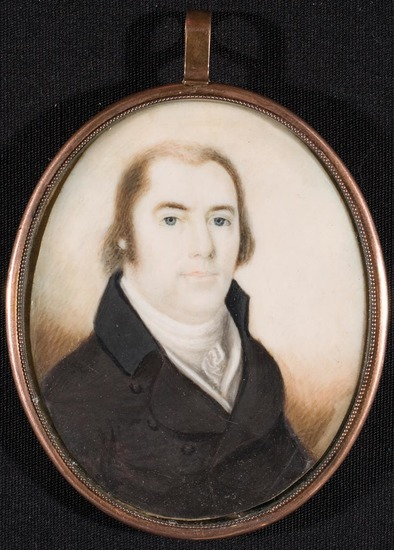
Nominee	John Treadwell	Ephraim Kirby
Party	Federalist	Democratic-Republican
Popular vote	9,066	2,038
Percentage	79.00%	17.80%
Lieutenant Governor before election
John Treadwell
Federalist
Elected Lieutenant Governor
John Treadwell
Federalist

The 1801 Connecticut lieutenant gubernatorial election was held on April 13, 1801, in order to elect the lieutenant governor of Connecticut. Incumbent Federalist lieutenant governor John Treadwell defeated Democratic-Republican candidate Ephraim Kirby and other candidates.

== General election ==
On election day, April 13, 1801, incumbent Federalist lieutenant governor John Treadwell won re-election by a margin of 7,028 votes against his foremost opponent Democratic-Republican candidate Ephraim Kirby, thereby retaining Federalist control over the office of lieutenant governor. Treadwell was sworn in for his fourth term on May 14, 1801.

=== Results ===
Connecticut lieutenant gubernatorial election, 1801
Party	Candidate	Votes	%
Federalist	John Treadwell (incumbent)	9,066	79.00
Democratic-Republican	Ephraim Kirby	2,038	17.80
	Scattering	368	3.20
Total votes		11,472	100.00
Federalist hold			
