= 1803 New Jersey gubernatorial election =

- October 27, 1803
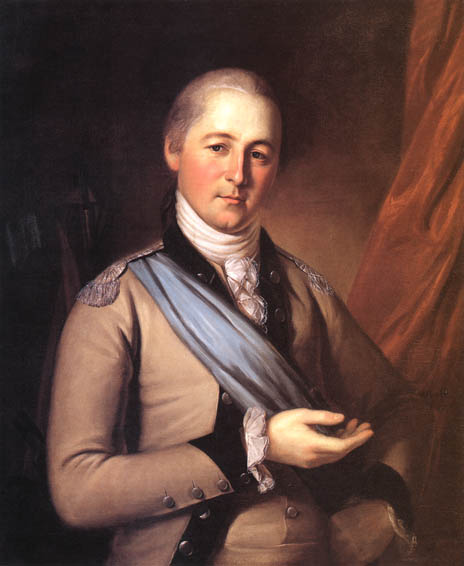

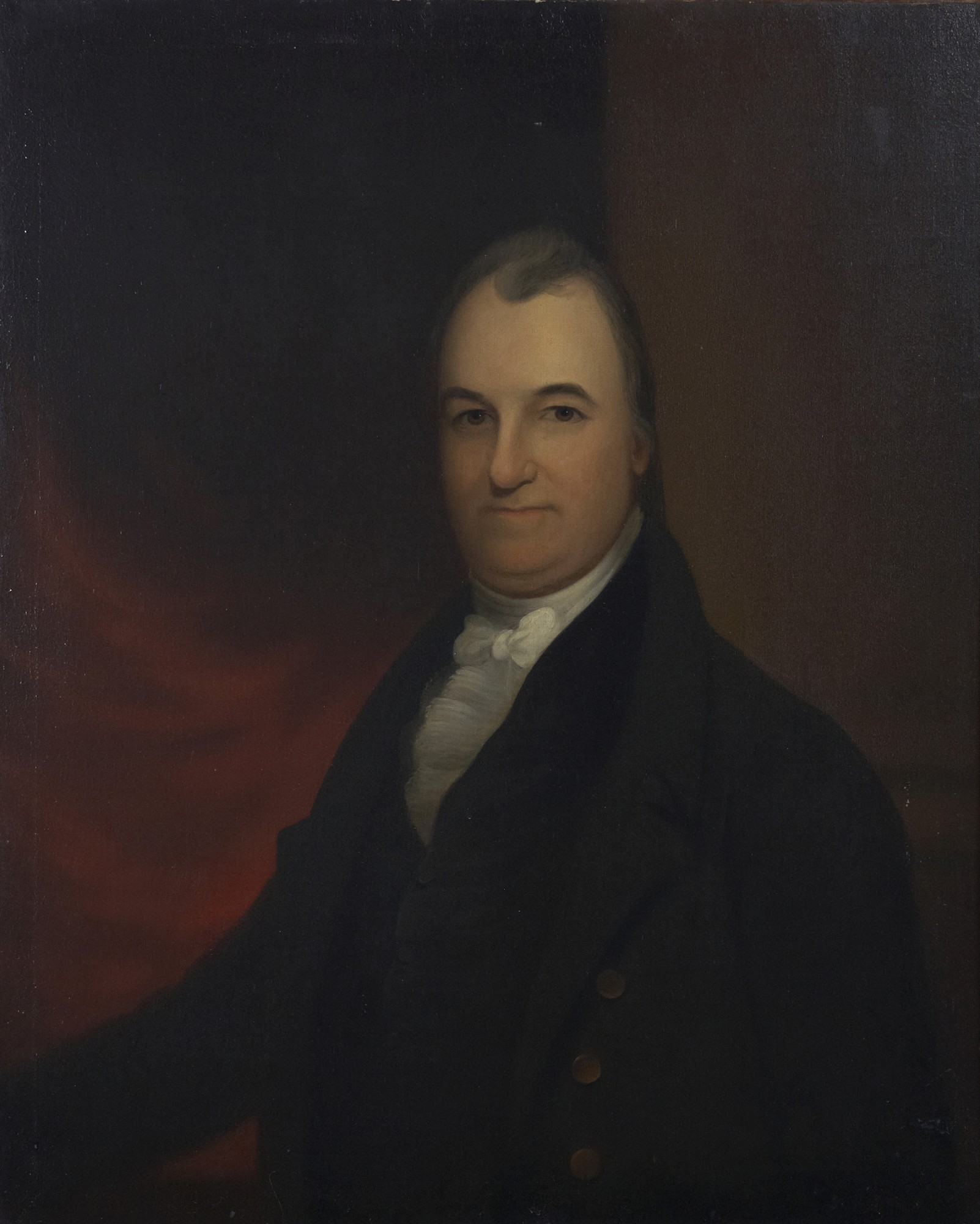
Nominee	Joseph Bloomfield	Richard Stockton
Party	Democratic-Republican	Federalist
Popular vote	33	17
Percentage	66.00%	34.00%
Governor before election
John Lambert (Acting)
Democratic-Republican
Elected Governor
Joseph Bloomfield
Democratic-Republican

The 1803 New Jersey gubernatorial election was held on October 27, 1803, in order to elect the governor of New Jersey. Former Democratic-Republican governor Joseph Bloomfield was elected by the New Jersey General Assembly against Federalist nominee and former United States senator from New Jersey Richard Stockton in another rematch of the previous election.

== General election ==
On election day, October 27, 1803, former Democratic-Republican governor Joseph Bloomfield was elected by the New Jersey General Assembly by a margin of 16 votes against his opponent Federalist nominee Richard Stockton, thereby retaining Democratic-Republican control over the office of governor. Bloomfield was sworn in for his second non-consecutive term that same day.

=== Results ===
New Jersey gubernatorial election, 1803
Party	Candidate	Votes	%
Democratic-Republican	Joseph Bloomfield	33	66.00%
Federalist	Richard Stockton	17	34.00%
Total votes		50	100.00%
Democratic-Republican hold			
