= 1802 Virginia gubernatorial election =

- December 11, 1802
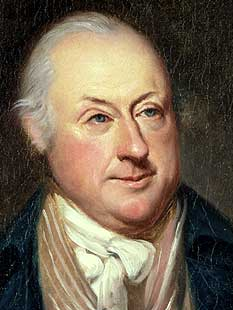

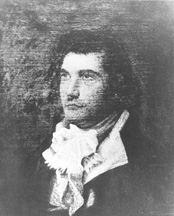
Nominee	John Page	Abraham B. Venable
Governor before election
James Monroe
Democratic-Republican
Elected Governor
John Page
Democratic-Republican (Note: Lampi lists no parties for this election. Both Kallenbach and Kallenbach and Sobel and Raimo list Page as a Democratic-Republican during his tenure.)

A gubernatorial election was held in Virginia on December 11, 1802. The former U.S. representative from Virginia's 12th congressional district John Page defeated the member of the Virginia House of Delegates from Prince Edward County Abraham B. Venable.

The incumbent governor of Virginia James Monroe was ineligible for re-election due to term limits established by the Constitution of Virginia. The election was conducted by the Virginia General Assembly in joint session. Page was the only declared candidate at the start of balloting. Voting proceeded in the House of Delegates chamber, after which the tellers withdrew to count the votes. Page was elected with a majority on the first ballot.

== General election ==
1802 Virginia gubernatorial election
Candidate	First ballot	
Candidate	Count	Percent
John Page	**	
Abraham B. Venable	**	
Total	**	100.00

== Bibliography ==
- Kallenbach, Joseph E.; Kallenbach, Jessamine S. (1977). American State Governors, 1776–1976. Vol. 1. Dobbs Ferry, NY: Oceana Publications.
- Lampi, Philip J. (2012). "Virginia 1802 Governor". A New Nation Votes. American Antiquarian Society.
- Reese, George H.; Hickin, Patricia, eds. (1973). Journal of the Senate of Virginia: Session of 1802/03. Richmond: Virginia State Library.
- Sobel, Robert; Raimo, John (1978). Biographical Directory of the Governors of the United States 1789–1978. Vol. 4. Westport, CT: Meckler Books.
