= 1803 Connecticut lieutenant gubernatorial election =

- April 11, 1803
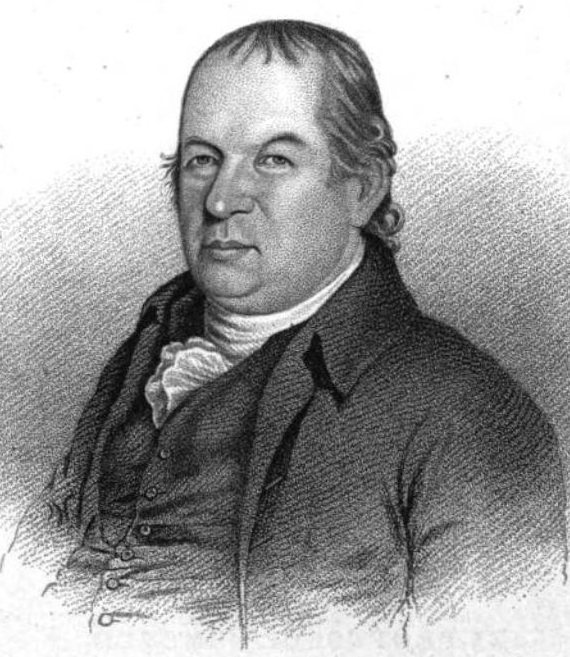

Nominee	John Treadwell	William Hart
Party	Federalist	Democratic-Republican
Popular vote	13,148	6,057
Percentage	65.80%	30.30%
Lieutenant Governor before election
John Treadwell
Federalist
Elected Lieutenant Governor
John Treadwell
Federalist

The 1803 Connecticut lieutenant gubernatorial election was held on April 11, 1803, in order to elect the lieutenant governor of Connecticut. Incumbent Federalist lieutenant governor John Treadwell defeated Democratic-Republican candidate William Hart and other candidates.

== General election ==
On election day, April 11, 1803, incumbent Federalist lieutenant governor John Treadwell won re-election by a margin of 7,091 votes against his foremost opponent Democratic-Republican candidate William Hart, thereby retaining Federalist control over the office of lieutenant governor. Treadwell was sworn in for his sixth term on May 12, 1803.

=== Results ===
Connecticut lieutenant gubernatorial election, 1803
Party	Candidate	Votes	%
Federalist	John Treadwell (incumbent)	13,148	65.80
Democratic-Republican	William Hart	6,057	30.30
	Scattering	838	3.90
Total votes		19,992	100.00
Federalist hold			
