= 1802 New Jersey gubernatorial election =

- October 28, 1802
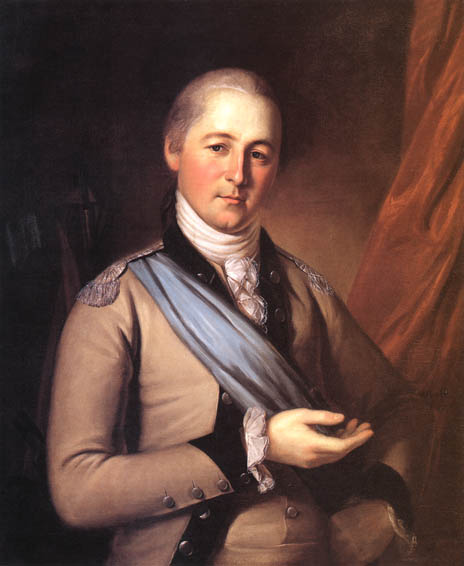

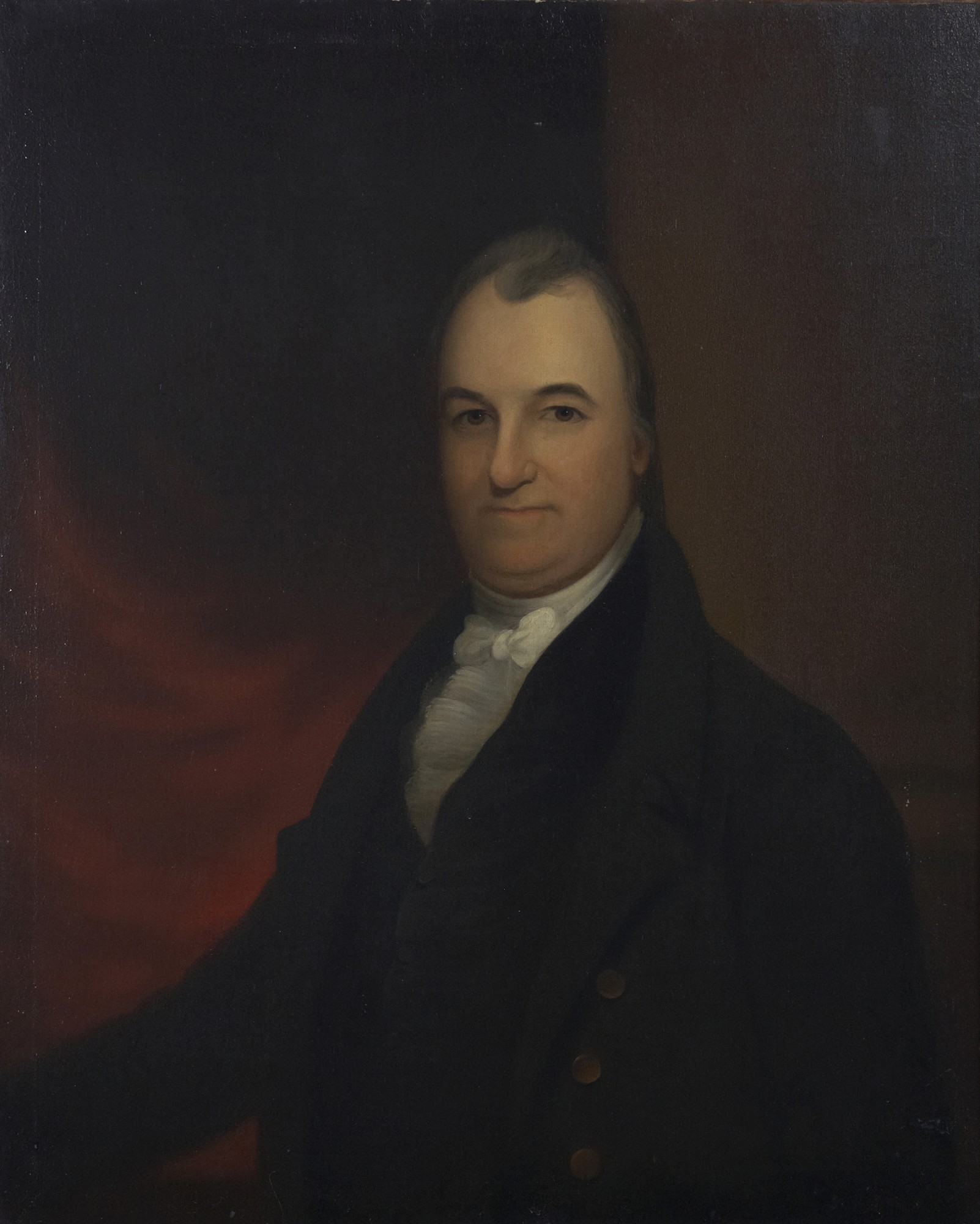
Nominee	Joseph Bloomfield	Richard Stockton
Party	Democratic-Republican	Federalist
Popular vote	26	26
Percentage	50.00%	50.00%
Governor before election
Joseph Bloomfield
Democratic-Republican
Elected Governor
John Lambert (Acting)
Democratic-Republican

The 1802 New Jersey gubernatorial election was held on October 28, 1802, in order to elect the governor of New Jersey. Incumbent Democratic-Republican governor Joseph Bloomfield ran against Federalist nominee and former United States senator from New Jersey Richard Stockton in a rematch of the previous election. But both received the same number of votes from the New Jersey General Assembly, resulting in a deadlocked election. The legislature was unable to pick a winning candidate, and on November 25, 1802, the vice-president of the Legislative Council John Lambert was appointed as acting governor to serve out the one-year term.

== General election ==
On election day, October 28, 1802, incumbent Democratic-Republican governor Joseph Bloomfield received the same number of votes from the New Jersey General Assembly as his opponent Federalist nominee Richard Stockton, resulting in a deadlocked election. On November 25, 1802, it was decided to appoint the vice-president of the Legislative Council John Lambert as acting governor so he could serve out the one-year term, thereby retaining Democratic-Republican control over the office of governor. Lambert was sworn in as acting governor on November 25, 1802.

=== Results ===
New Jersey gubernatorial election, 1802
Party	Candidate	Votes	%
Democratic-Republican	Joseph Bloomfield (incumbent)	26	50.00%
Federalist	Richard Stockton	26	50.00%
Total votes		52	100.00%
Democratic-Republican hold			
