= 1801 Tennessee gubernatorial election =

- August 6–7, 1801
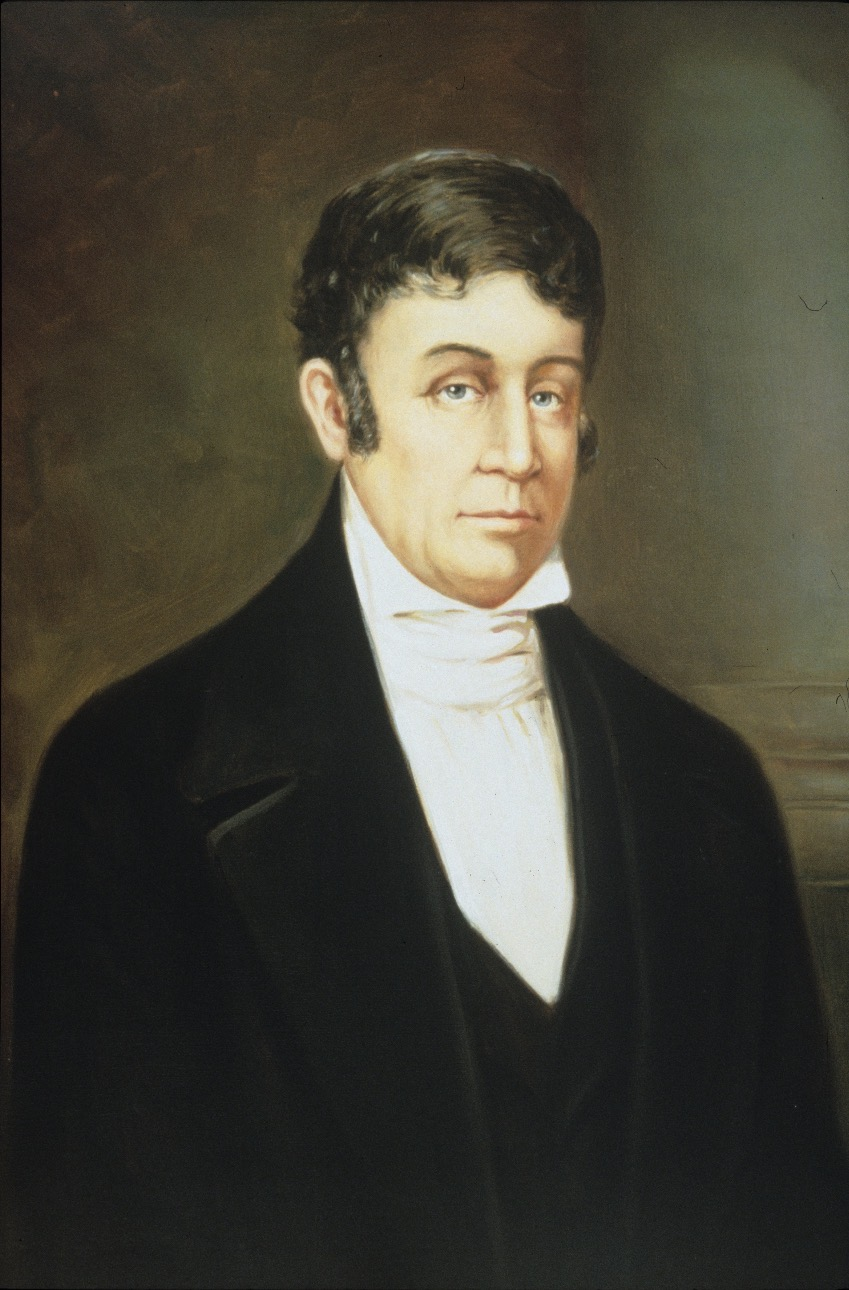
Nominee	Archibald Roane
Party	Democratic-Republican
Popular vote	8,438
Percentage	99.88%
Governor before election
John Sevier
Democratic-Republican
Elected Governor
Archibald Roane
Democratic-Republican

The 1801 Tennessee gubernatorial election took place from August 6–7, 1801. The incumbent governor, John Sevier, had reached his three consecutive term limits and had to wait until 1803 to run again. Democratic-Republican judge Archibald Roane won a term almost unanimously against other Democratic-Republican nominee John Boyd.

== Results ==
Tennessee gubernatorial election, 1801
Party	Candidate	Votes	%
Democratic-Republican	Archibald Roane	8,438	99.88%
Democratic-Republican	John Boyd	10	0.12%
Total votes		8,448	100%

== See also ==
- 1801 Tennessee's at-large congressional district special election
- 1801 United States gubernatorial elections
