= 1802 North Carolina gubernatorial special election =

- December 4, 1802
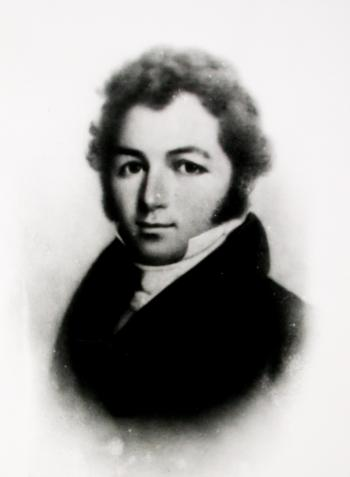

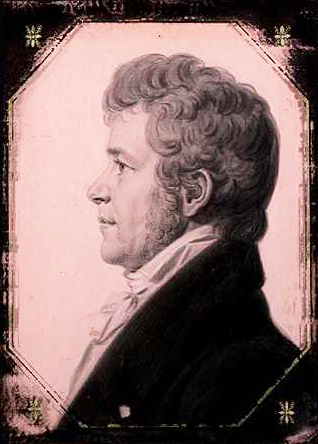
| Nominee | James Turner | Thomas Blount |
| Party | Democratic-Republican | Democratic-Republican |
| Popular vote | 112 | 51 |
| Percentage | 65.50% | 29.82% |
Governor before election
John Baptista Ashe
Democratic-Republican
Elected Governor
James Turner
Democratic-Republican

The 1802 North Carolina gubernatorial special election was held on December 4, 1802, in order to elect the Governor of North Carolina following the death of Governor-elect John Baptista Ashe on November 27, 1802. Democratic-Republican candidate and former member of the North Carolina Senate James Turner was elected by the North Carolina General Assembly against fellow Democratic-Republican candidate and former member of the U.S. House of Representatives from North Carolina's 9th district Thomas Blount and fellow Democratic-Republican candidate and former member of the North Carolina House of Representatives John R. Eaton.

== General election ==
On election day, December 4, 1802, Democratic-Republican candidate James Turner was elected by the North Carolina General Assembly by a margin of 61 votes against his foremost opponent Democratic-Republican candidate Thomas Blount, thereby retaining Democratic-Republican control over the office of Governor. Turner was sworn in as the 12th Governor of North Carolina on December 6, 1802.

=== Results ===
North Carolina gubernatorial special election, 1802
| Party | Candidate | Votes | % |
|---|---|---|---|
| Democratic-Republican | James Turner | 112 | 65.50 |
| Democratic-Republican | Thomas Blount | 51 | 29.82 |
| Democratic-Republican | John R. Eaton | 8 | 4.68 |
| Total votes | | 171 | 100.00 |
| Democratic-Republican hold | | | |
