= 1801 Pennsylvania's 8th congressional district special election =

Special Election Held in Pennsylvania

A special election was held in Pennsylvania's 8th congressional district on January 15, 1801, to fill a vacancy left by the death of Thomas Hartley (F) on December 21, 1800

== Election results ==
Candidate	Party	Votes	Percent
John Stewart	Democratic-Republican	476	87.8%
Scattering		66	11.2%

Stewart took his seat February 3, 1801. Stewart had also won the general elections in 1800.
