= 1803 Ohio gubernatorial election =

- January 11, 1803
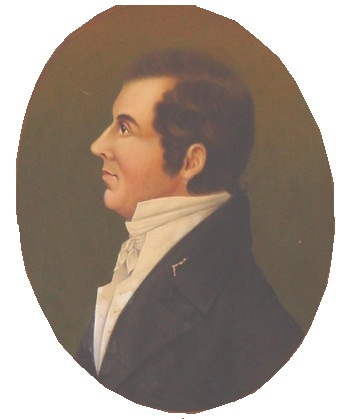
Nominee	Edward Tiffin
Party	Democratic-Republican
Popular vote	5,379
Percentage	89.77%
- county results Tiffin: 70–80% 80–90% 90–100% No Data/Vote
Governor before election
Charles Willing Byrd (Territorial)
Elected Governor
Edward Tiffin
Democratic-Republican

The 1803 Ohio gubernatorial election was held on January 11, 1803, in order to elect the first Governor of Ohio upon Ohio acquiring statehood on March 1, 1803. Democratic-Republican nominee and former Speaker of the Northwest Territory House of Representatives Edward Tiffin defeated Federalist candidates Benjamin I. Gilman, Arthur St. Clair and Bezaleel Wells.

== General election ==
On election day, January 11, 1803, Democratic-Republican nominee Edward Tiffin won the election by a margin of 5,133 votes against his foremost opponent Federalist candidate Benjamin I. Gilman, establishing Democratic-Republican control over the new office of Governor. Tiffin was sworn in as the first Governor of the new state of Ohio on March 3, 1803.

=== Results ===
Ohio gubernatorial election, 1803
Party	Candidate	Votes	%
Democratic-Republican	Edward Tiffin	5,379	89.77%
Federalist	Benjamin I. Gilman	246	4.11%
Federalist	Arthur St. Clair	234	3.91%
Federalist	Bezaleel Wells	89	1.49%
	Scattering	44	0.72%
Total votes		5,992	100.00%
Democratic-Republican hold			
