= 1803 Maryland gubernatorial election =

- November 14, 1803
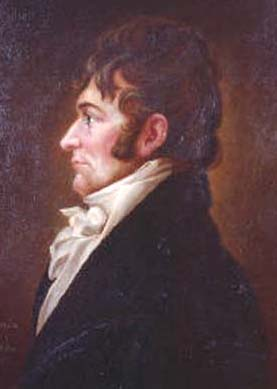

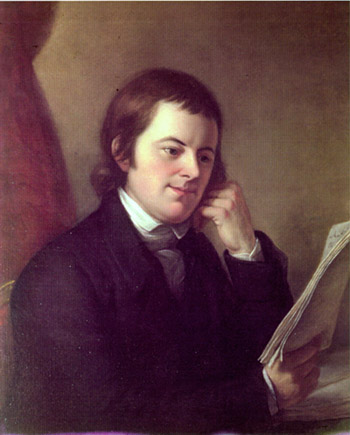

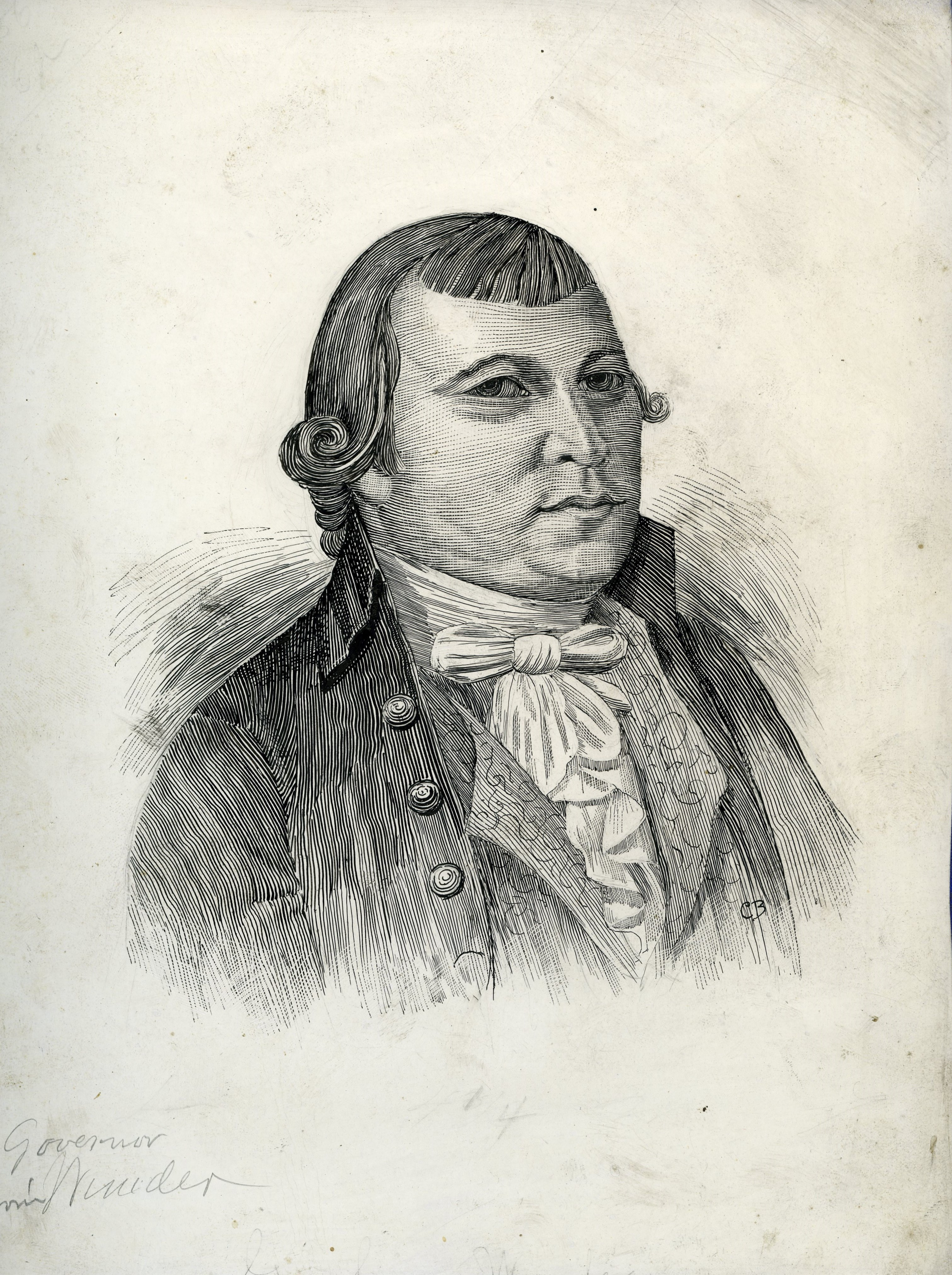
Nominee	Robert Bowie	Thomas Johnson	Levin Winder
Party	Democratic-Republican	Federalist	Federalist
Popular vote	75	5	1
Percentage	92.59%	6.17%	1.23%
Governor before election
John Francis Mercer
Democratic-Republican
Elected Governor
Robert Bowie
Democratic-Republican

The 1803 Maryland gubernatorial election was held on November 14, 1803, in order to elect the Governor of Maryland. Democratic-Republican nominee and former member of the Maryland House of Delegates Robert Bowie was easily elected by the Maryland General Assembly as he ran unopposed. The Federalists did not nominate a candidate for Governor, with 21 of the 27 Federalist legislators present voting for Robert Bowie.

== General election ==
On election day, November 14, 1803, Democratic-Republican nominee Robert Bowie was elected by the Maryland General Assembly, thereby retaining Democratic-Republican control over the office of governor. Bowie was sworn in as the 11th Governor of Maryland on November 15, 1803.

=== Results ===
Maryland gubernatorial election, 1803
Party	Candidate	Votes	%
Democratic-Republican	Robert Bowie	75	92.59
Federalist	Thomas Johnson	5	6.17
Federalist	Levin Winder	1	1.23
Total votes		81	100.00
Democratic-Republican hold			
