= 1803 Virginia gubernatorial election =

- December 19, 1803
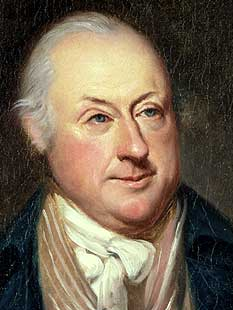
Nominee	John Page
Governor before election
John Page
Democratic-Republican
Elected Governor
John Page
Democratic-Republican (Note: Lampi lists no parties for this election. Both Kallenbach and Kallenbach and Sobel and Raimo list Page as a Democratic-Republican during his tenure.)

A gubernatorial election was held in Virginia on December 19, 1803. The incumbent governor of Virginia John Page was re-elected unanimously.

The election was conducted by the Virginia General Assembly in joint session. Page was elected with a majority on the first ballot.

== General election ==
1803 Virginia gubernatorial election
Candidate	First ballot	
Candidate	Count	Percent
John Page (incumbent)	**	
Total	**	100.00
