= 1801 New York gubernatorial election =

- April 1801
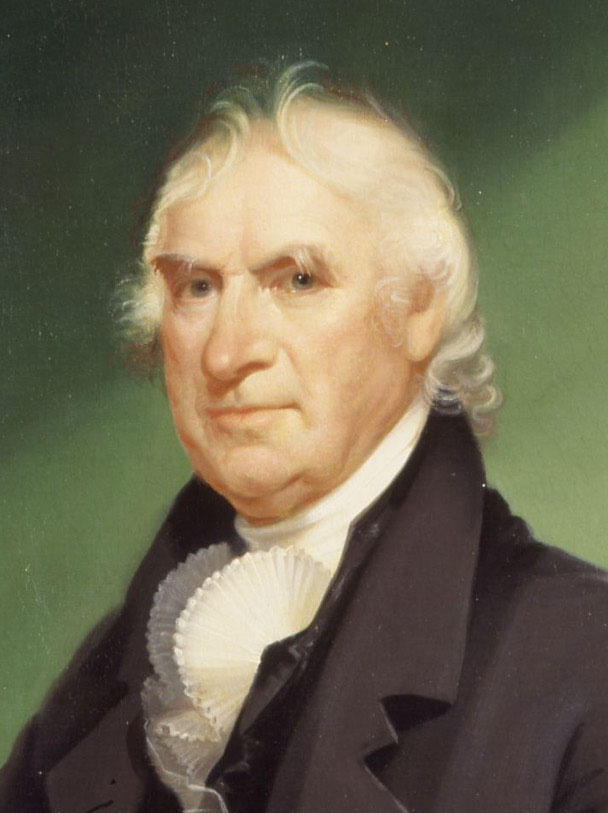

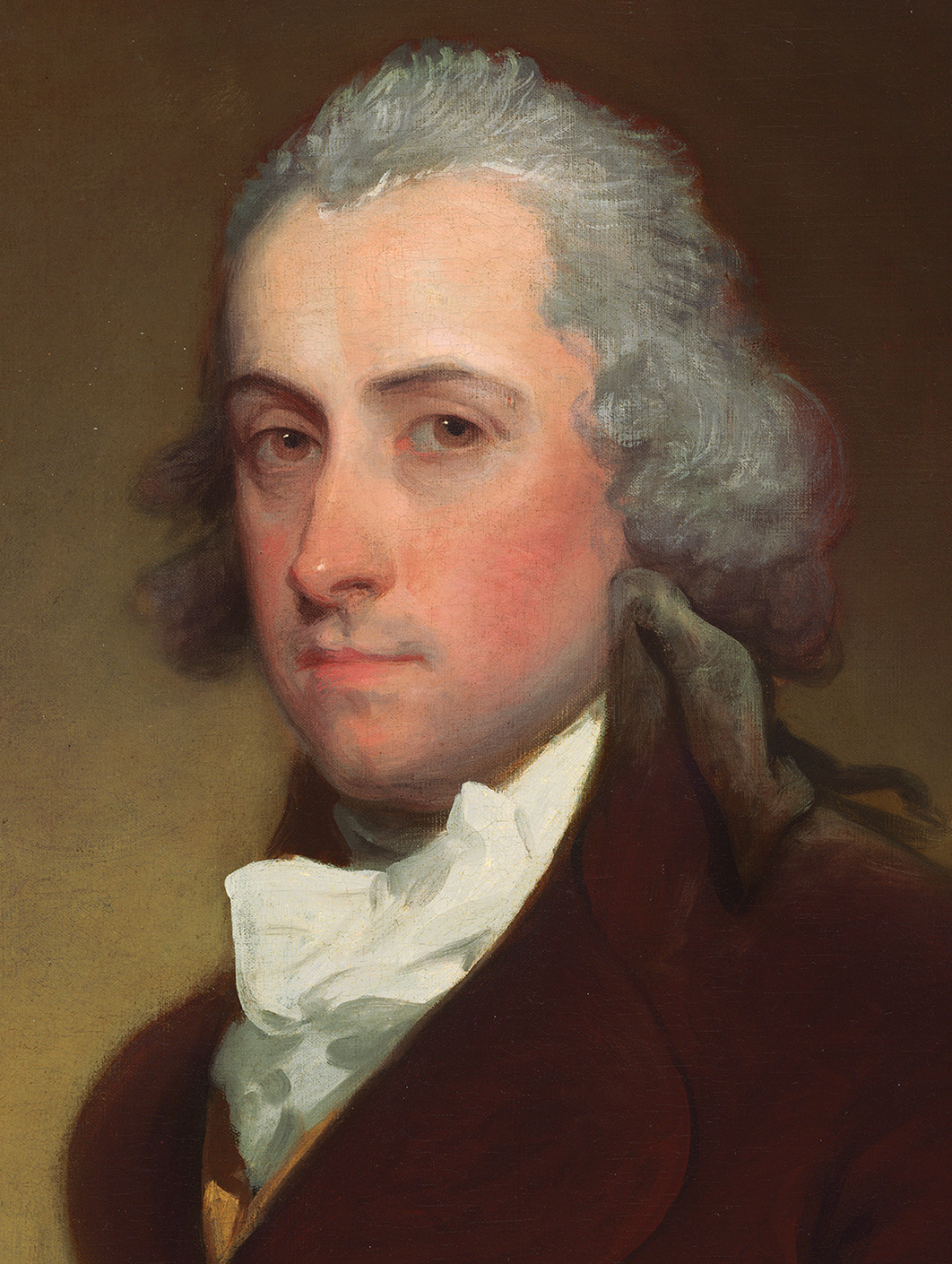
Nominee	George Clinton	Stephen Van Rensselaer
Party	Democratic-Republican	Federalist
Popular vote	24,808	20,843
Percentage	54.34%	45.66%
- County results Clinton: 50–60% 60–70% 70–80% 80–90% >90% Rensselaer: 50–60% 60–70% 70–80% 80–90%
Governor before election
John Jay
Federalist
Elected Governor
George Clinton
Democratic-Republican

The 1801 New York gubernatorial election was held in April 1801 to elect the governor of New York. Former governor George Clinton returned to office, defeating Federalist Stephen Van Rensselaer.

== Background ==
Though Federalist John Jay had been elected governor in 1795 and re-elected easily in 1798, the Jeffersonian Republican Party gained seats in the legislature throughout his term in office. By the start of his second term, both the federal policies of Alien and Sedition Acts and increased federal tax duties, on the one hand, and the "High Federalist" policies of Jay and Alexander Hamilton, on the other, had come to divide and degrade the Federalist Party in the state. In 1798, anticipating a Federalist majority, Republicans and eight to ten liberal Federalists introduced a bill to split the state's presidential electors by district, thereby securing some Republican electors in a Federalist-majority state. The bill passed the Assembly but was defeated in the Senate. The Virginia and Kentucky Resolutions, criticizing the John Adams administration and asserting the rights of states to interpose on behalf of their citizens, were also introduced to the legislature at the 1798 session but were rejected after significant debate by a vote of 50–43.

Despite growing problems for the Federalist Party, they made gains in the 1799 state election following the Manhattan Company scandal, in which Aaron Burr maneuvered the passage of an act chartering a company "for supplying the city of New York with pure and wholesome water". However, the bill contained a provision granting the new company the right to engage in banking, and soon after the charter was granted, the company gave up any pretense of supplying water. Burr and his allies controlled stock in the company, which was intended to break the Federalist monopoly on credit and lend to Republican small businesses. The fraudulent means by which they gained the charter sank their political fortunes. In New York City, Burr and the Republican ticket lost decidedly in 1799, and Republicans lost seats elsewhere in the state.

=== Election of 1800 ===
By 1800, the ongoing prosecutions of journalists under the Alien and Sedition Acts rendered the Federalists unpopular throughout most of the country, including in New York. The April 1800 state elections were expected to decide the upcoming presidential election (via the election of presidential electors by the legislature) and resulted in a triumph for Republicans, who captured both chambers of the legislature. In New York City, Aaron Burr mediated the rivalry between the Clinton and Livingston families to assemble a Republican ticket led by former governor George Clinton and featuring a number of Republican luminaries. Burr himself won a seat in Orange County. Burr's efforts were aided by the Tammany Society, a growing political force in the city which would come to dominate New York politics. The final year of Jay's term was marked by dysfunction and legislative gridlock, as the Republican legislative council blocked his nominations for state office.

The spring legislative elections also guaranteed that, under the law then in place, Thomas Jefferson would secure the state's electoral votes in the upcoming presidential election. As his running mate, the Republicans sought a New Yorker and selected Burr over Clinton and Robert R. Livingston. In anticipation of the clear Republican majority in the next legislature, which would nearly guarantee the election of Thomas Jefferson as president, Alexander Hamilton urged Governor Jay to call a special session of the existing Federalist legislature in order to elect presidential electors. Jay broke with Hamilton by flatly refusing the suggestion. The presidential election ultimately resulted in an electoral tie between Jefferson and Burr, which was decided in favor of Jefferson in the House of Representatives. However, Burr's failed efforts during the contingent House election to curry Federalist support, rather than accept the vice presidency magnanimously, damaged his standing with President Jefferson and the national Republican Party.

=== Qualifications ===
Under Article VII of the New York Constitution of 1777, only certain male freeholders and certain freemen of Albany or New York City could vote:

VII. That every male inhabitant of full age, who shall have personally resided within one of the counties of this State for six months immediately preceding the day of election, shall, at such election, be entitled to vote for representatives of the said county in assembly; if, during the time aforesaid, he shall have been a freeholder, possessing a freehold of the value of twenty pounds, within the said county, or have rented a tenement therein of the yearly value of forty shillings, and been rated and actually paid taxes to this State: Provided always, That every person who now is a freeman of the city of Albany, or who was made a freeman of the city of New York on or before the fourteenth day of October, in the year of our Lord one thousand seven hundred and seventy-five, and shall be actually and usually resident in the said cities, respectively, shall be entitled to vote for representatives in assembly within his said place of residence.

== General election ==
=== Candidates ===
- George Clinton, assemblyman from New York City and former Governor (Republican)
- Stephen Van Rensselaer, Lieutenant Governor of New York (Federalist)

=== Campaign ===
Republicans launched a campaign against both the Alien and Sedition Acts at the national level and the imposition of state tax on land.

=== Results ===
1801 New York gubernatorial election
Party	Candidate	Votes	%	±%
Democratic-Republican	George Clinton	24,808	54.34%	▲8.35
Federalist	Stephen Van Rensselaer	20,843	45.66%	▼8.35
Total votes		45,651	100.00%	

== See also ==
- New York gubernatorial elections
- New York state elections
