= 1801 Rhode Island gubernatorial election =

- April 1, 1801
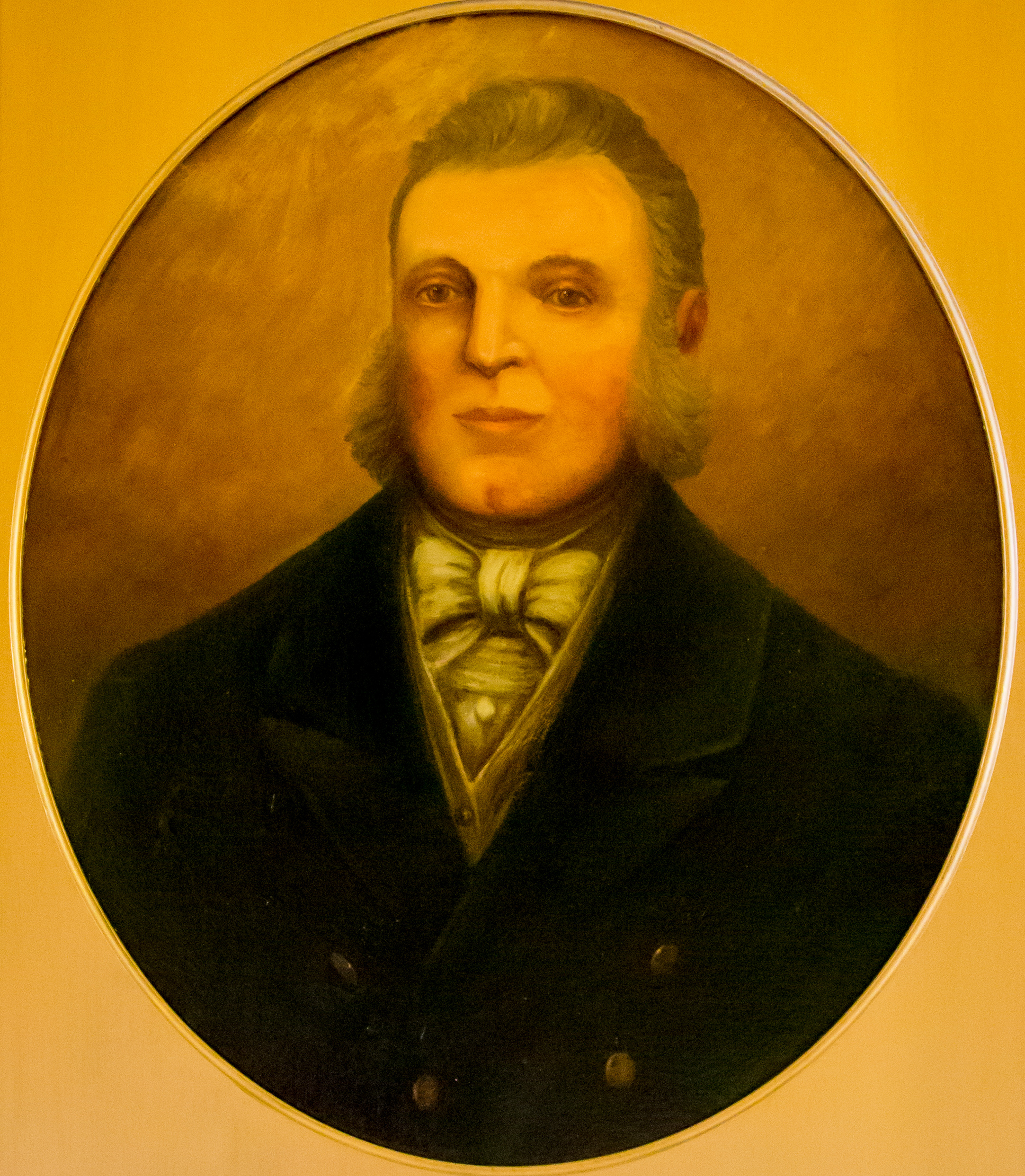
Nominee	Arthur Fenner
Party	Democratic-Republican
Popular vote	3,756
Percentage	100.00%
- County results Fenner: 90–100%
Governor before election
Arthur Fenner
Democratic-Republican
Elected Governor
Arthur Fenner
Democratic-Republican

The 1801 Rhode Island gubernatorial election was an uncontested election held on April 1, 1801, to elect the governor of Rhode Island. Arthur Fenner, the incumbent governor, was the sole candidate and so won with 100% of the vote. (Note: Dubin and OurCampaigns give Fenner's total as 3,760. This discrepancy involves four additional votes in Bristol County.)
