= 1803 Georgia gubernatorial election =

- November 24, 1803
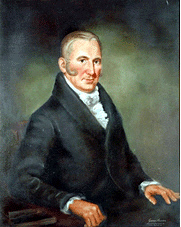

Nominee	John Milledge	Solomon Wood
Party	Democratic-Republican
Popular vote	65	6
Percentage	91.55%	8.45%
Governor before election
John Milledge
Democratic-Republican
Elected Governor
John Milledge
Democratic-Republican

The 1803 Georgia gubernatorial election was held on November 24, 1803, in order to elect the governor of Georgia. Incumbent Democratic-Republican governor John Milledge won re-election against Solomon Wood in a Georgia General Assembly vote.

== General election ==
On election day, November 24, 1803, incumbent Democratic-Republican governor John Milledge won re-election against his opponent Solomon Wood. Milledge was sworn in for his first full term on November 25, 1803.

=== Results ===
Georgia gubernatorial election, 1803
Party	Candidate	Votes	%
Democratic-Republican	John Milledge (incumbent)	65	91.55
	Solomon Wood	6	8.45
Total votes		71	100.00
Democratic-Republican hold			
