= 1801 New Hampshire gubernatorial election =

- March 10, 1801
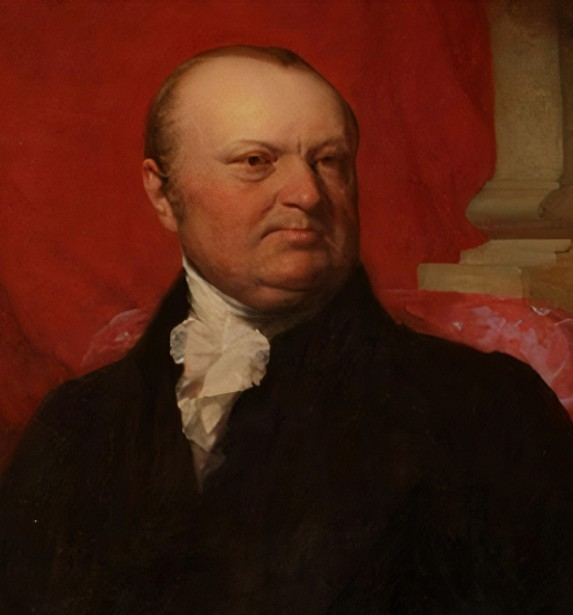

| Nominee | John Taylor Gilman | Timothy Walker |
| Party | Federalist | Democratic-Republican |
| Popular vote | 10,898 | 5,249 |
| Percentage | 65.50% | 31.55% |
Governor before election
John Taylor Gilman
Federalist
Elected Governor
John Taylor Gilman
Federalist

The 1801 New Hampshire gubernatorial election took place on March 10, 1801. Incumbent Federalist Governor John Taylor Gilman won re-election to an eighth term, defeating Democratic-Republican candidate Timothy Walker in a re-match of the previous year's election.

== Results ==
1801 New Hampshire gubernatorial election
| Party | Candidate | Votes | % | ±% |
|---|---|---|---|---|
| Federalist | John Taylor Gilman (incumbent) | 10,898 | 65.50% | |
| Democratic-Republican | Timothy Walker | 5,249 | 31.55% | |
| Scattering | | 492 | 2.96% | |
| Majority | | 5,649 | 33.95% | |
| Turnout | | 16,639 | 100.00% | |
| Federalist hold | | Swing | | |
