= 1803 North Carolina gubernatorial election =

- November 28, 1803
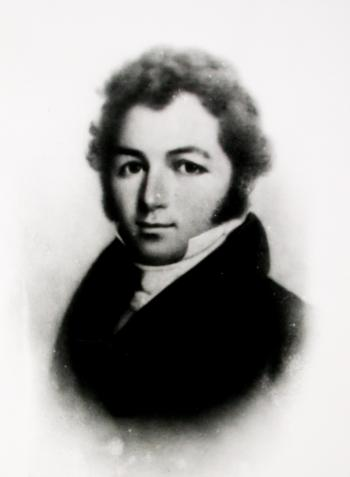
Nominee	James Turner
Party	Democratic-Republican
Popular vote	100
Percentage	98.04%
Governor before election
James Turner
Democratic-Republican
Elected Governor
James Turner
Democratic-Republican

The 1803 North Carolina gubernatorial election was held on November 28, 1803, in order to elect the governor of North Carolina. Incumbent Democratic-Republican governor James Turner was re-elected by the North Carolina General Assembly as he ran unopposed.

== General election ==
On election day, November 28, 1803, incumbent Democratic-Republican governor James Turner was re-elected by the North Carolina General Assembly, thereby retaining Democratic-Republican control over the office of governor. Turner was sworn in for his second term on December 6, 1803.

=== Results ===
North Carolina gubernatorial election, 1803
Party	Candidate	Votes	%
Democratic-Republican	James Turner (incumbent)	100	98.04
	Scattering	2	1.96
Total votes		102	100.00
Democratic-Republican hold			
