= 1801 Georgia gubernatorial election =

- November 6, 1801

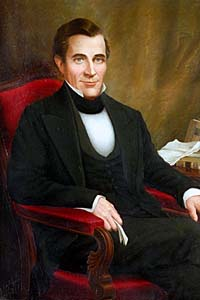
Nominee	Josiah Tattnall	Thomas P. Carnes	Jared Irwin
Party	Democratic-Republican	Federalist	Democratic-Republican
Popular vote	41	21	7
Percentage	59.42%	30.44%	10.14%
Governor before election
David Emanuel
Democratic-Republican
Elected Governor
Josiah Tattnall
Democratic-Republican

The 1801 Georgia gubernatorial election was held on November 6, 1801, in order to elect the governor of Georgia. Democratic-Republican candidate and former United States senator from Georgia Josiah Tattnall defeated Federalist candidate and former member of the U.S. House of Representatives from Georgia's at-large congressional district Thomas P. Carnes and former Democratic-Republican governor Jared Irwin in a Georgia General Assembly vote.

== General election ==
On election day, November 6, 1801, Democratic-Republican candidate Josiah Tattnall won the election against his foremost opponent Federalist candidate Thomas P. Carnes. Tattnall was sworn in as the 25th governor of Georgia on November 7, 1801.

=== Results ===
Georgia gubernatorial election, 1801
Party	Candidate	Votes	%
Democratic-Republican	Josiah Tattnall	41	59.42
Federalist	Thomas P. Carnes	21	30.44
Democratic-Republican	Jared Irwin	7	10.14
Total votes		69	100.00
Democratic-Republican hold			
