= 1801 Tennessee's at-large congressional district special election =

William Dickson defeated John Reah, George W. Campbell, and John Cocke to begin the 7th Congress in place of William C. C. Claiborne.
