= 1801 North Carolina gubernatorial election =

- November 25, 1801
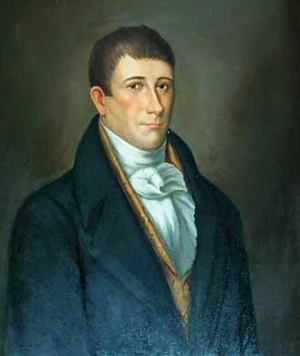

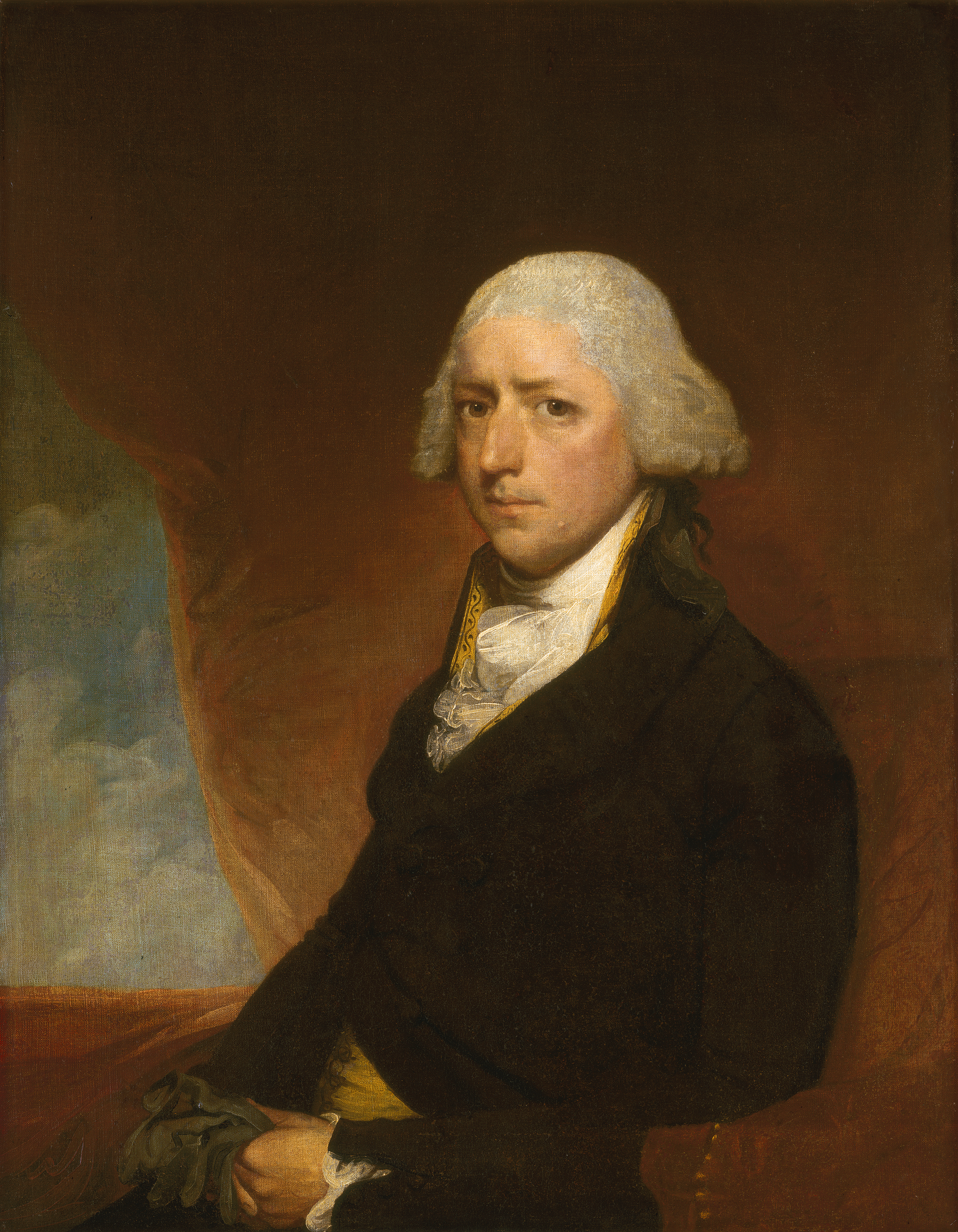
Nominee	Benjamin Williams	John Baptista Ashe
Party	Federalist	Democratic-Republican
Popular vote	119	58
Percentage	66.85%	32.58%
Governor before election
Benjamin Williams
Federalist
Elected Governor
Benjamin Williams
Federalist

The 1801 North Carolina gubernatorial election was held on November 25, 1801, in order to elect the Governor of North Carolina. Incumbent Federalist Governor Benjamin Williams was re-elected by the North Carolina General Assembly against Democratic-Republican candidate and former member of the U.S. House of Representatives from North Carolina's 3rd district John Baptista Ashe and fellow Democratic-Republican candidate and former Federalist Governor Richard Dobbs Spaight.

== General election ==
On election day, November 25, 1801, incumbent Federalist Governor Benjamin Williams was re-elected by the North Carolina General Assembly by a margin of 61 votes against his foremost opponent Democratic-Republican candidate John Baptista Ashe, thereby retaining Federalist control over the office of Governor. Williams was sworn in for his third term on November 28, 1801.

=== Results ===
North Carolina gubernatorial election, 1801
Party	Candidate	Votes	%
Federalist	Benjamin Williams (incumbent)	119	66.85
Democratic-Republican	John Baptista Ashe	58	32.58
Democratic-Republican	Richard Dobbs Spaight	1	0.57
Total votes		178	100.00
Federalist hold			
