= 1801 Maryland gubernatorial election =

- November 9, 1801
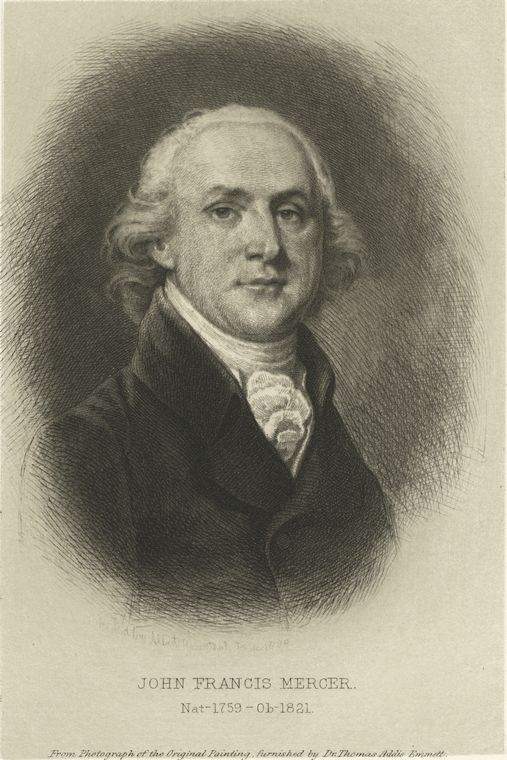

| Nominee | John Francis Mercer | James Murray |
| Party | Democratic-Republican | Federalist |
| Popular vote | 59 | 26 |
| Percentage | 69.41% | 30.59% |
Governor before election
Benjamin Ogle
Federalist
Elected Governor
John Francis Mercer
Democratic-Republican

The 1801 Maryland gubernatorial election was held on November 9, 1801, in order to elect the Governor of Maryland. Democratic-Republican nominee and former member of the U.S. House of Representatives from Maryland's 2nd district John Francis Mercer was elected by the Maryland General Assembly against his opponent Federalist nominee James Murray.

== General election ==
On election day, November 9, 1801, Democratic-Republican nominee John Francis Mercer was elected by the Maryland General Assembly, thereby gaining Democratic-Republican control over the office of governor. Mercer was sworn in as the 10th Governor of Maryland on November 10, 1801.

=== Results ===
Maryland gubernatorial election, 1801
| Party | Candidate | Votes | % |
|---|---|---|---|
| Democratic-Republican | John Francis Mercer | 59 | 69.41 |
| Federalist | James Murray | 26 | 30.59 |
| Total votes | | 85 | 100.00 |
| Democratic-Republican gain from Federalist | | | |
