= 1801 New Jersey gubernatorial election =

- October 31, 1801
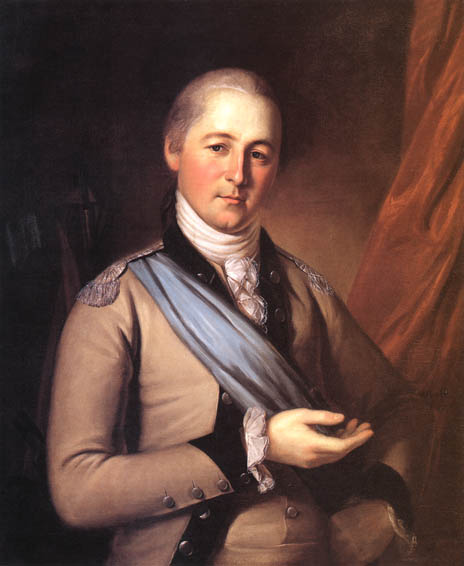

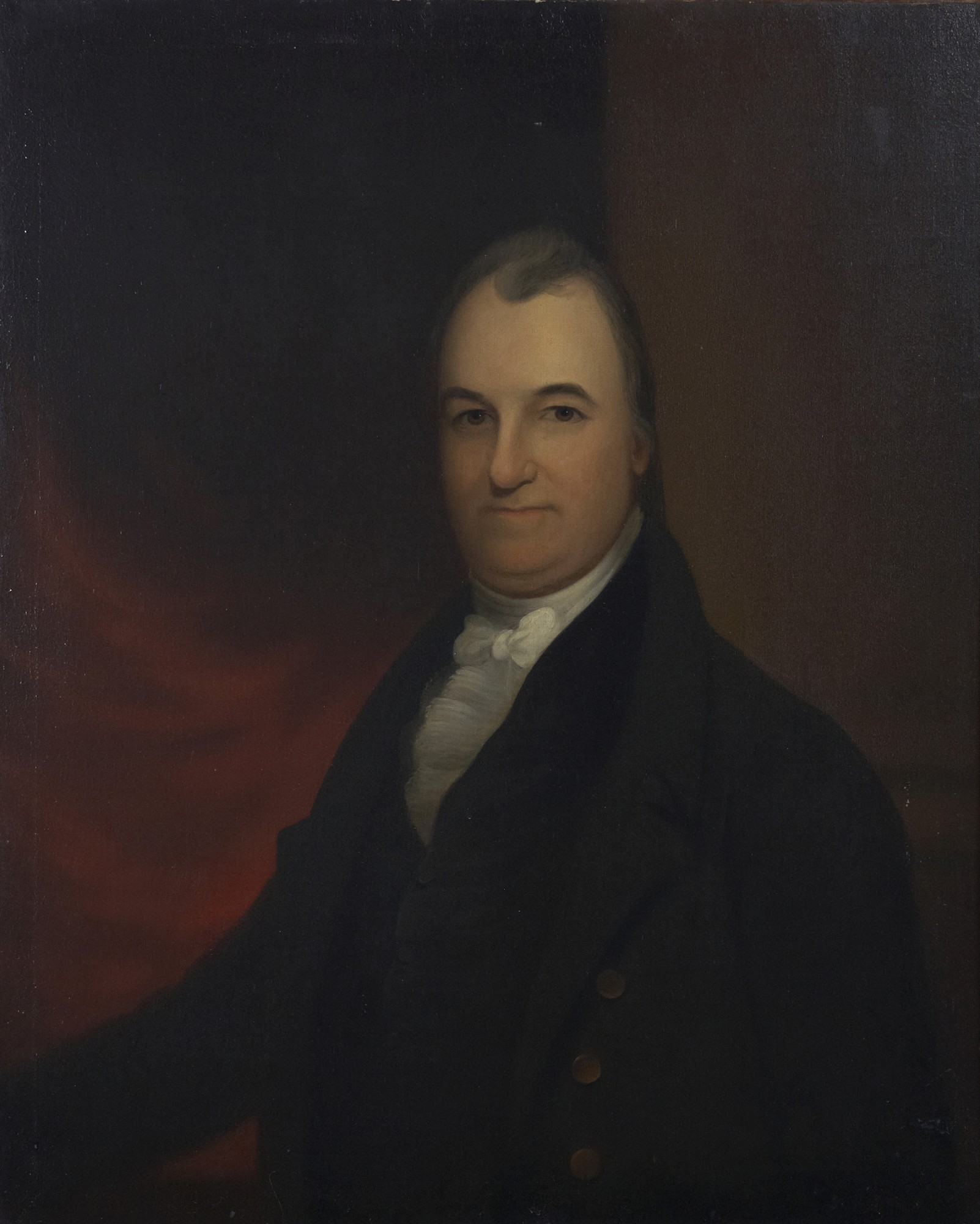
Nominee	Joseph Bloomfield	Richard Stockton
Party	Democratic-Republican	Federalist
Popular vote	30	20
Percentage	60.00%	40.00%
Governor before election
Richard Howell
Federalist
Elected Governor
Joseph Bloomfield
Democratic-Republican

The 1801 New Jersey gubernatorial election was held on October 31, 1801, in order to elect the Governor of New Jersey. Democratic-Republican nominee and former Mayor of Burlington Joseph Bloomfield was elected by the New Jersey General Assembly against Federalist nominee and former United States Senator from New Jersey Richard Stockton.

== General election ==
On election day, October 31, 1801, Democratic-Republican nominee Joseph Bloomfield was elected by the New Jersey General Assembly by a margin of 10 votes against his opponent Federalist nominee Richard Stockton, thereby gaining Democratic-Republican control over the office of Governor. Bloomfield was sworn in as the 4th Governor of New Jersey that same day.

=== Results ===
New Jersey gubernatorial election, 1801
Party	Candidate	Votes	%
Democratic-Republican	Joseph Bloomfield	30	60.00%
Federalist	Richard Stockton	20	40.00%
Total votes		50	100.00%
Democratic-Republican gain from Federalist			
