= Thomas P. Carnes =

American politician (1762-1822)

Thomas Petters Carnes (1762 in Bladensburg, Maryland – May 5, 1822 in Milledgeville, Georgia) was an American lawyer and politician from Franklin County, Georgia. He served as a colonel in the Maryland Line during the American Revolution and received bounty land in Franklin County for his service.

He served in the Georgia House of Representatives at Milledgeville as a state court judge, represented Georgia in the United States House of Representatives from 1793 until 1795, losing reelection to John Milledge. He also ran for the U.S. House in 1791 and 1796, and was the Federalist nominee for U.S. Senate in 1798 and 1800, as well as in the 1801 and 1802 gubernatorial elections. Carnesville, Georgia, is his namesake. Although he considered his home to be Athens in Clarke County (created from Franklin County), he died in Milledgeville and is buried there at Memory Hill Cemetery.

== Notes ==
U.S. House of Representatives
Preceded by John Milledge	Member of the U.S. House of Representatives from Georgia's at-large congressional district March 4, 1793 – March 3, 1795	Succeeded by John Milledge
