= 1804–05 United States House of Representatives elections =

House elections for the 9th U.S. Congress

- April 24, 1804 – August 5, 1805

All 142 seats in the United States House of Representatives 72 seats needed for a majority
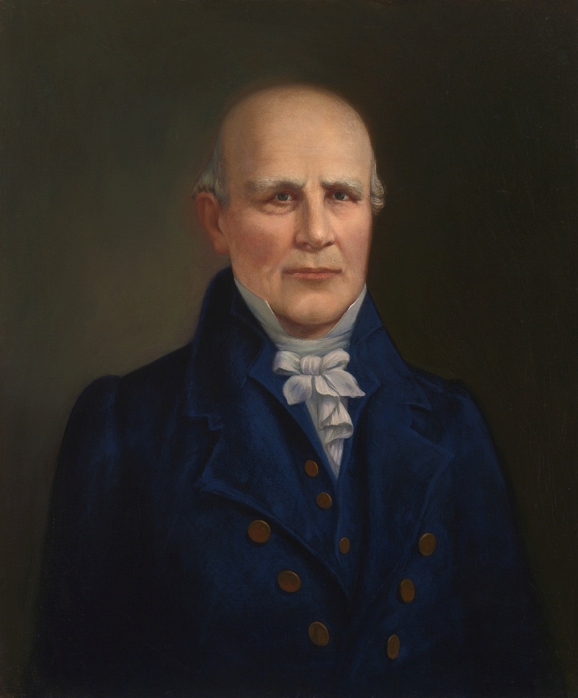

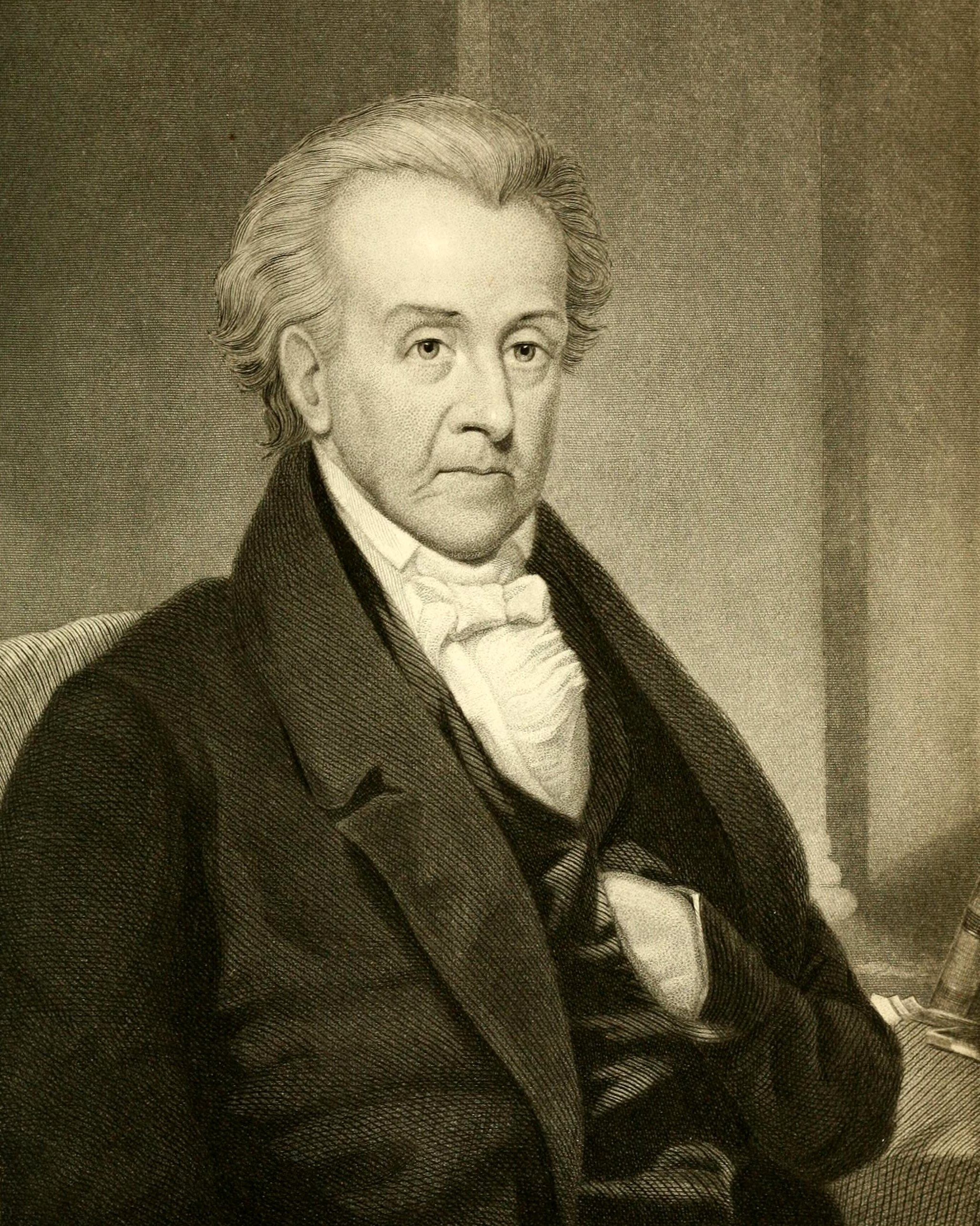
	Majority party	Minority party
Leader	Nathaniel Macon	John Cotton Smith
Party	Democratic-Republican	Federalist
Leader's seat	North Carolina 6th	Connecticut at-large
Last election	103 seats	39 seats
Seats won	114	28
Seat change	▲11	▼11
- Results: Federalist hold Federalist gain Democratic-Republican hold Democratic-Republican gain Dissident Republican Gain Undistricted
Speaker before election
Nathaniel Macon
Democratic-Republican
Elected Speaker
Nathaniel Macon
Democratic-Republican

The 1804–05 United States House of Representatives elections were held on various dates in various states between April 24, 1804 (in New York), and August 5, 1805 (in Tennessee). Each state set its own date for its elections to the House of Representatives before the first session of the 9th United States Congress convened on December 2, 1805. The elections occurred at the same time as President Thomas Jefferson's re-election. Elections were held for all 142 seats, representing 17 states.

Under Jefferson's popular administration, his party continued to gain seats in the House. Territorial acquisitions from the Louisiana Purchase and economic expansion gave voters a positive view of the Democratic-Republicans, whose majority, already commanding in the 8th Congress, now surpassed three-quarters of the total membership. Following this election, Federalists were able to secure few seats outside of New England and party legitimacy deteriorated as political thought turned away from Federalist ideals which were perceived to be elitist and anti-democratic.

== Election summaries ==
↓
114	28
Democratic-Republican	Federalist

State	Type	Date	Total seats	Democratic- Republican		Federalist	
State	Type	Date	Total seats	Seats	Change	Seats	Change
New York	Districts	April 24–26, 1804	17	15	▲3	2	▼3
Kentucky	Districts	August 6, 1804	6	6	Steady	0	Steady
North Carolina	Districts	August 10, 1804	12	12	▲1	0	▼1
New Hampshire	At-large	August 27, 1804	5	0	Steady	5	Steady
Rhode Island	At-large	August 28, 1804	2	2	Steady	0	Steady
Vermont	Districts	September 4, 1804 (Note: Majority required for election, which was not met in 2 districts necessitating additional elections on December 18, 1804 and March 25, 1805)	4	2	▲1	2	▼1
Connecticut	At-large	September 17, 1804	7	0	Steady	7	Steady
Maryland	Districts	October 1, 1804	9	7	▲1	2	▼1
Delaware	At-large	October 2, 1804	1	0	▼1	1	▲1
Georgia	At-large	October 2, 1804	4	4	Steady	0	Steady
South Carolina	Districts	October 8–9, 1804	8	8	▲2	0	▼2
Ohio	At-large	October 9, 1804	1	1	Steady	0	Steady
Pennsylvania	Districts	October 9, 1804	18	17	▼1	1	▲1
Massachusetts	Districts	November 5, 1804	17	10	▲3	7	▼3
New Jersey	At-large	November 6–7, 1804	6	6	Steady	0	Steady
Late elections (after the March 4, 1805, beginning of the next Congress)
Virginia	Districts	April 1805	22	21	▲3	1	▼3
Tennessee	Districts	August 4–5, 1805	3	3	Steady	0	Steady
Total			142	114 80.3%	▲11	28 19.7%	▼11

House seats
Dem-Republican	80.28%
Federalist	19.72%

== Special elections ==
There were special elections in 1804 and 1805 during the 8th United States Congress and 9th United States Congress.

Elections are sorted here by date then district.

=== 8th Congress ===
District	Incumbent			This race	
District	Representative	Party	First elected	Results	Candidates
New York 1	John Smith	Democratic- Republican	1799 (special)	Incumbent resigned February 22, 1804. New member elected April 24–26, 1804 and seated November 5, 1804. Democratic-Republican hold. Winner was not elected to the next term on the same ballot; see below.	▌ ✓ Samuel Riker (Democratic-Republican) 36.8%; ▌Eliphalet Wickes (Democratic-Republican) 36.1%; ▌Joshua Smith (Federalist) 27.1%
Massachusetts 12	Thomson J. Skinner	Democratic- Republican	1796 (special); 1799 (retired); 1803	Incumbent resigned August 10, 1804. New member elected September 17, 1804 and seated November 5, 1804. Democratic-Republican hold. Winner was not a candidate for the next term; see below.	▌ ✓ Simon Larned (Democratic-Republican) 61.9%; ▌Daniel Dewey (Federalist) 38.1%
Maryland 4	Daniel Hiester	Democratic- Republican	1788 (Penn.); 1796 (resigned); 1801 (Md.)	Incumbent died March 7, 1804. New member elected October 1, 1804 and seated November 6, 1804. Democratic-Republican hold. Winner was also elected to the next term; see below.	▌ ✓ Roger Nelson (Democratic-Republican); Uncontested
Virginia 13	John Johns Trigg	Democratic- Republican	1803	Incumbent died May 17, 1804. New member elected in October 1804 and seated November 5, 1804. Democratic-Republican hold. Winner was later elected to the next term; see below.	▌ ✓ Christopher H. Clark (Democratic-Republican); Uncontested
Pennsylvania 10	William Hoge	Democratic- Republican	1802	Incumbent resigned October 15, 1804. New member elected November 2, 1804 to finish his brother's term and seated November 27, 1804. Democratic-Republican hold. Winner was not a candidate to the next term; see below.	▌ ✓ John Hoge (Democratic-Republican) (Note: Note: Source mistakenly identifies Hoge as a Federalist.) 52.1%; ▌Aaron Lyle (Democratic-Republican) 47.9%
Virginia 5	Andrew Moore	Democratic- Republican	1789	Incumbent resigned to become U.S. Senator. New member elected November 13, 1804 and seated December 4, 1804. Democratic-Republican hold. Winner was later elected to the next term; see below.	▌ ✓ Alexander Wilson (Democratic-Republican); Uncontested
New York 3	Samuel L. Mitchill	Democratic- Republican	1800	Incumbent resigned November 22, 1804 to become U.S. Senator. New member elected January 2–4, 1805 and seated February 14, 1805. Democratic-Republican hold. Winner was also elected to the next term; see below.	▌ ✓ George Clinton (Democratic-Republican) 88.5%; ▌James Smith (Unknown) 5.4%; ▌James Woods (Unknown) 4.3%; ▌Thomas Van Pelt (Unknown) 0.8%; Scattering 1.0%

=== 9th Congress ===
District	Incumbent			This race	
District	Representative	Party	First elected	Results	Candidates
New York 2	Daniel D. Tompkins	Democratic- Republican	1804	Representative-elect declined the seat to become associate justice of the New York Supreme Court. New member elected September 11–13, 1804 and seated December 2, 1805. Democratic-Republican hold.	▌ ✓ Gurdon S. Mumford (Democratic-Republican) 84.2%; ▌George I. Warner (Unknown) 15.8%
New York 3	Samuel L. Mitchill	Democratic- Republican	1800	Incumbent resigned November 22, 1804 to become U.S. Senator. New member elected January 2–4, 1805 and seated December 2, 1805. Democratic-Republican hold. Winner was also elected to finish the previous term; see above.	▌ ✓ George Clinton (Democratic-Republican) 89.1%%; ▌James Smith (Unknown) 5.2%; ▌James Woods (Unknown) 4.3%; ▌Thomas Van Pelt (Unknown) 0.3%; Scattering 0.5%
North Carolina 5	James Gillespie	Democratic- Republican	1793; 1799 (lost); 1803	Representative-elect died January 5, 1805. New member elected August 8, 1805 and seated December 2, 1805. Democratic-Republican hold.	▌ ✓ Thomas Kenan (Democratic-Republican) 65.3%; ▌Benjamin Smith (Democratic-Republican) (Note: Benjamin Smith was also supported by the Federalists.) 34.7%
Connecticut at-large 2 seats on a general ticket	Calvin Goddard	Federalist	1801 (special)	Both incumbents/representatives-elect resigned. New members elected September 16, 1805 and seated December 2 and 10, 1805. (Note: Date given for the start of the term, of the person elected at the special election (source: Congressional Biographical Directory). In some cases this is clearly wrong as the date of the legal start of the Congress is given, even though the member was elected at a later date.); Federalist holds.	▌ ✓ Timothy Pitkin (Federalist); ▌ ✓ Lewis B. Sturges (Federalist); [data missing]
Connecticut at-large 2 seats on a general ticket	Roger Griswold	Federalist	1794	Both incumbents/representatives-elect resigned. New members elected September 16, 1805 and seated December 2 and 10, 1805. Federalist holds.	▌ ✓ Timothy Pitkin (Federalist); ▌ ✓ Lewis B. Sturges (Federalist); [data missing]
South Carolina 8	John B. Earle	Democratic- Republican	1803	Incumbent/representative-elect resigned. New member elected September 26–27, 1805. Democratic-Republican hold.	▌ ✓ Elias Earle (Democratic-Republican); [data missing]
Delaware at-large	James A. Bayard Sr.	Federalist	1796	Representative-elect declined the seat to become U.S. Senator. New member elected October 1, 1805. Federalist hold.	▌ ✓ James M. Broom (Federalist) 52.6%; ▌David Hall (Democratic-Republican) 46.9%; ▌Isaac H. Starr (Democratic-Republican) 0.4%; ▌Hugh W. Richie (Unknown) <0.1%
Pennsylvania 4	John A. Hanna	Democratic- Republican	1796	Representative-elect died July 23, 1805. New member elected October 8, 1805. Democratic-Republican hold.	▌ ✓ Robert Whitehill (Democratic-Republican) 70.7%; ▌James Duncan (Federalist) 29.3%
Pennsylvania 11	John B. C. Lucas	Democratic- Republican	1802	Representative-elect declined the seat. New member elected October 8, 1805 and seated December 2, 1805. Democratic-Republican hold.	▌ ✓ Samuel Smith (Democratic-Republican) 52.8%; ▌James O'Hara (Federalist) 35.9%; ▌Nathaniel Irish (Quid) 11.2%
Indiana Territory at-large	None (district created).			New delegate elected December 12, 1805. Federalist gain.	First ballot: ▌Benjamin Parke (Federalist) 5 votes; ▌Thomas J. Davis (Unknown) 5 votes; ▌Jesse B. Thomas (Unknown) 1 vote; Second ballot: ▌Benjamin Parke (Federalist) 5 votes; ▌Thomas J. Davis (Unknown) 5 votes; ▌Shadrach Bond (Unknown) 1 vote; Third ballot: ▌ ✓ Benjamin Parke (Federalist) 7 votes; ▌Thomas J. Davis (Unknown) 4 votes

== Connecticut ==
District	Incumbent	Party	First elected	Result	Candidates
Connecticut at-large 7 seats on a general ticket	Calvin Goddard	Federalist	1801 (special)	Incumbent re-elected but declined to serve, leading to a special election, see above.	▌ ✓ Calvin Goddard (Federalist) 15.1%; ▌ ✓ Samuel W. Dana (Federalist) 14.9%; ▌ ✓ John Davenport (Federalist) 14.4%; ▌ ✓ Roger Griswold (Federalist) 14.4%; ▌ ✓ Benjamin Tallmadge (Federalist) 13.3%; ▌ ✓ John Cotton Smith (Federalist) 11.4%; ▌ ✓ Jonathan O. Moseley (Federalist) 10.8%; ▌Timothy Pitkin (Federalist) 3.1%; ▌Lewis B. Sturges (Federalist) 0.7%; ▌Theodore Dwight (Federalist) 0.5%; Others 1.4%
Connecticut at-large 7 seats on a general ticket	Samuel W. Dana	Federalist	1796	Incumbent re-elected.	▌ ✓ Calvin Goddard (Federalist) 15.1%; ▌ ✓ Samuel W. Dana (Federalist) 14.9%; ▌ ✓ John Davenport (Federalist) 14.4%; ▌ ✓ Roger Griswold (Federalist) 14.4%; ▌ ✓ Benjamin Tallmadge (Federalist) 13.3%; ▌ ✓ John Cotton Smith (Federalist) 11.4%; ▌ ✓ Jonathan O. Moseley (Federalist) 10.8%; ▌Timothy Pitkin (Federalist) 3.1%; ▌Lewis B. Sturges (Federalist) 0.7%; ▌Theodore Dwight (Federalist) 0.5%; Others 1.4%
Connecticut at-large 7 seats on a general ticket	John Davenport	Federalist	1798	Incumbent re-elected.	▌ ✓ Calvin Goddard (Federalist) 15.1%; ▌ ✓ Samuel W. Dana (Federalist) 14.9%; ▌ ✓ John Davenport (Federalist) 14.4%; ▌ ✓ Roger Griswold (Federalist) 14.4%; ▌ ✓ Benjamin Tallmadge (Federalist) 13.3%; ▌ ✓ John Cotton Smith (Federalist) 11.4%; ▌ ✓ Jonathan O. Moseley (Federalist) 10.8%; ▌Timothy Pitkin (Federalist) 3.1%; ▌Lewis B. Sturges (Federalist) 0.7%; ▌Theodore Dwight (Federalist) 0.5%; Others 1.4%
Connecticut at-large 7 seats on a general ticket	Roger Griswold	Federalist	1794	Incumbent re-elected but declined to serve, leading to a special election, see above.	▌ ✓ Calvin Goddard (Federalist) 15.1%; ▌ ✓ Samuel W. Dana (Federalist) 14.9%; ▌ ✓ John Davenport (Federalist) 14.4%; ▌ ✓ Roger Griswold (Federalist) 14.4%; ▌ ✓ Benjamin Tallmadge (Federalist) 13.3%; ▌ ✓ John Cotton Smith (Federalist) 11.4%; ▌ ✓ Jonathan O. Moseley (Federalist) 10.8%; ▌Timothy Pitkin (Federalist) 3.1%; ▌Lewis B. Sturges (Federalist) 0.7%; ▌Theodore Dwight (Federalist) 0.5%; Others 1.4%
Connecticut at-large 7 seats on a general ticket	Benjamin Tallmadge	Federalist	1801 (special)	Incumbent re-elected.	▌ ✓ Calvin Goddard (Federalist) 15.1%; ▌ ✓ Samuel W. Dana (Federalist) 14.9%; ▌ ✓ John Davenport (Federalist) 14.4%; ▌ ✓ Roger Griswold (Federalist) 14.4%; ▌ ✓ Benjamin Tallmadge (Federalist) 13.3%; ▌ ✓ John Cotton Smith (Federalist) 11.4%; ▌ ✓ Jonathan O. Moseley (Federalist) 10.8%; ▌Timothy Pitkin (Federalist) 3.1%; ▌Lewis B. Sturges (Federalist) 0.7%; ▌Theodore Dwight (Federalist) 0.5%; Others 1.4%
Connecticut at-large 7 seats on a general ticket	John Cotton Smith	Federalist	1800	Incumbent re-elected.	▌ ✓ Calvin Goddard (Federalist) 15.1%; ▌ ✓ Samuel W. Dana (Federalist) 14.9%; ▌ ✓ John Davenport (Federalist) 14.4%; ▌ ✓ Roger Griswold (Federalist) 14.4%; ▌ ✓ Benjamin Tallmadge (Federalist) 13.3%; ▌ ✓ John Cotton Smith (Federalist) 11.4%; ▌ ✓ Jonathan O. Moseley (Federalist) 10.8%; ▌Timothy Pitkin (Federalist) 3.1%; ▌Lewis B. Sturges (Federalist) 0.7%; ▌Theodore Dwight (Federalist) 0.5%; Others 1.4%
Connecticut at-large 7 seats on a general ticket	Simeon Baldwin	Federalist	1803 (special)	Incumbent retired. New member elected. Federalist hold.	▌ ✓ Calvin Goddard (Federalist) 15.1%; ▌ ✓ Samuel W. Dana (Federalist) 14.9%; ▌ ✓ John Davenport (Federalist) 14.4%; ▌ ✓ Roger Griswold (Federalist) 14.4%; ▌ ✓ Benjamin Tallmadge (Federalist) 13.3%; ▌ ✓ John Cotton Smith (Federalist) 11.4%; ▌ ✓ Jonathan O. Moseley (Federalist) 10.8%; ▌Timothy Pitkin (Federalist) 3.1%; ▌Lewis B. Sturges (Federalist) 0.7%; ▌Theodore Dwight (Federalist) 0.5%; Others 1.4%

== Delaware ==
District	Incumbent	Party	First elected	Result	Candidates
Delaware at-large	Caesar A. Rodney	Democratic-Republican	1802	Incumbent lost re-election. Federalist gain. Successor declined to serve, leading to a special election; see above.	▌ ✓ James A. Bayard Sr. (Federalist) 52.1%; ▌Caesar A. Rodney (Democratic-Republican) 47.9%

== Georgia ==
District	Incumbent	Party	First elected	Result	Candidates
Georgia at-large 4 seats on a general ticket	Peter Early	Democratic-Republican	1802	Incumbent re-elected.	▌ ✓ Peter Early (Democratic-Republican) 24.2%; ▌ ✓ David Meriwether (Democratic-Republican) 22.9%; ▌ ✓ Joseph Bryan (Democratic-Republican) 21.3%; ▌ ✓ Cowles Mead (Democratic-Republican) 10.9%; ▌Thomas Spalding (Democratic-Republican) 10.5%; ▌Thomas Carr (Unknown) 6.7%; ▌Obadiah Jones (Unknown) 2.4%; ▌Thomas U. P. Charlton (Democratic-Republican) 1.2%
Georgia at-large 4 seats on a general ticket	David Meriwether	Democratic-Republican	1802	Incumbent re-elected.	▌ ✓ Peter Early (Democratic-Republican) 24.2%; ▌ ✓ David Meriwether (Democratic-Republican) 22.9%; ▌ ✓ Joseph Bryan (Democratic-Republican) 21.3%; ▌ ✓ Cowles Mead (Democratic-Republican) 10.9%; ▌Thomas Spalding (Democratic-Republican) 10.5%; ▌Thomas Carr (Unknown) 6.7%; ▌Obadiah Jones (Unknown) 2.4%; ▌Thomas U. P. Charlton (Democratic-Republican) 1.2%
Georgia at-large 4 seats on a general ticket	Joseph Bryan	Democratic-Republican	1802	Incumbent re-elected.	▌ ✓ Peter Early (Democratic-Republican) 24.2%; ▌ ✓ David Meriwether (Democratic-Republican) 22.9%; ▌ ✓ Joseph Bryan (Democratic-Republican) 21.3%; ▌ ✓ Cowles Mead (Democratic-Republican) 10.9%; ▌Thomas Spalding (Democratic-Republican) 10.5%; ▌Thomas Carr (Unknown) 6.7%; ▌Obadiah Jones (Unknown) 2.4%; ▌Thomas U. P. Charlton (Democratic-Republican) 1.2%
Georgia at-large 4 seats on a general ticket	Samuel Hammond	Democratic-Republican	1802	Incumbent retired. Democratic-Republican hold. Election was later contested and a new successor named.	▌ ✓ Peter Early (Democratic-Republican) 24.2%; ▌ ✓ David Meriwether (Democratic-Republican) 22.9%; ▌ ✓ Joseph Bryan (Democratic-Republican) 21.3%; ▌ ✓ Cowles Mead (Democratic-Republican) 10.9%; ▌Thomas Spalding (Democratic-Republican) 10.5%; ▌Thomas Carr (Unknown) 6.7%; ▌Obadiah Jones (Unknown) 2.4%; ▌Thomas U. P. Charlton (Democratic-Republican) 1.2%

== Indiana Territory ==
See Non-voting delegates, below.

== Kentucky ==
District	Incumbent	Party	First elected	Result	Candidates
Kentucky 1	Matthew Lyon	Democratic-Republican	1797 (Vt.); 1803	Incumbent re-elected.	▌ ✓ Matthew Lyon (Democratic-Republican) (Note: Source does not give numbers of votes or has incomplete data.); ▌Samuel Hopkins (Unknown)
Kentucky 2	John Boyle	Democratic-Republican	1803	Incumbent re-elected.	▌ ✓ John Boyle (Democratic-Republican) 100%
Kentucky 3	Matthew Walton	Democratic-Republican	1803	Incumbent re-elected.	▌ ✓ Matthew Walton (Democratic-Republican) 100%
Kentucky 4	Thomas Sandford	Democratic-Republican	1803	Incumbent re-elected.	▌ ✓ Thomas Sandford (Democratic-Republican) 100%
Kentucky 5	John Fowler	Democratic-Republican	1797	Incumbent re-elected.	▌ ✓ John Fowler (Democratic-Republican) 61.9%; ▌Benjamin Howard (Democratic-Republican) 38.1%
Kentucky 6	George M. Bedinger	Democratic-Republican	1803	Incumbent re-elected.	▌ ✓ George M. Bedinger (Democratic-Republican) 70.1%; ▌Robert H. Grayson (Democratic-Republican) 17.6%; ▌Philemon Thomas (Democratic-Republican) 12.3%

== Maryland ==
District	Incumbent	Party	First elected	Result	Candidates (Note: Unless otherwise noted, only candidates with at least 1% of the vote listed.)
Maryland 1	John Campbell	Federalist	1801	Incumbent re-elected.	▌ ✓ John Campbell (Federalist) 99.6%
Maryland 2	Walter Bowie	Democratic- Republican	1802 (special)	Incumbent retired. Democratic-Republican hold.	▌ ✓ Leonard Covington (Democratic-Republican) 52.0%; ▌Archibald Van Horne (Democratic-Republican) 46.8%; ▌Clement Hill (Federalist) 1.1%
Maryland 3	Thomas Plater	Federalist	1801	Incumbent lost re-election. Democratic-Republican gain.	▌ ✓ Patrick Magruder (Democratic-Republican) 56.0%; ▌Thomas Plater (Federalist) 44.0%
Maryland 4	Daniel Hiester	Democratic- Republican	1788 (Pennsylvania); 1796 (resigned); 1801 (Maryland)	Incumbent died March 7, 1804. Democratic-Republican hold. Successor was also elected on the same day to finish the current term; see above.	▌ ✓ Roger Nelson (Democratic-Republican) 98.5%; ▌Eli Williams (Federalist) 0.8%; Scattering 0.7%
Maryland 5 Plural district with 2 seats	Nicholas R. Moore	Democratic- Republican	1803	Incumbent re-elected.	▌ ✓ Nicholas R. Moore (Democratic-Republican) 50.9%; ▌ ✓ William McCreery (Democratic-Republican) 46.3%; ▌Robert Goodloe Harper (Federalist) 1.8%; Others 1.0%
Maryland 5 Plural district with 2 seats	William McCreery	Democratic- Republican	1803	Incumbent re-elected.	▌ ✓ Nicholas R. Moore (Democratic-Republican) 50.9%; ▌ ✓ William McCreery (Democratic-Republican) 46.3%; ▌Robert Goodloe Harper (Federalist) 1.8%; Others 1.0%
Maryland 6	John Archer	Democratic- Republican	1801	Incumbent re-elected.	▌ ✓ John Archer (Democratic-Republican); Uncontested
Maryland 7	Joseph H. Nicholson	Democratic- Republican	1798 (special)	Incumbent re-elected.	▌ ✓ Joseph H. Nicholson (Democratic-Republican) 99.6%
Maryland 8	John Dennis	Federalist	1796	Incumbent retired. Federalist hold.	▌ ✓ Charles Goldsborough (Federalist) 56.6%; ▌Henry Waggaman (Democratic-Republican) 43.4%

== Massachusetts ==
The majority requirement was met in all 17 districts in the 1804 elections.

District	Incumbent	Party	First elected	Result	Candidates
Massachusetts 1 "Suffolk district"	William Eustis	Democratic- Republican	1801	Incumbent lost re-election. Federalist gain.	▌ ✓ Josiah Quincy (Federalist) 51.0%; ▌William Eustis (Democratic-Republican) 49.0%
Massachusetts 2 "Essex South district"	Jacob Crowninshield	Democratic- Republican	1803	Incumbent re-elected.	▌ ✓ Jacob Crowninshield (Democratic-Republican) 58.7%; ▌Nathan Read (Federalist) 41.2%
Massachusetts 3 "Essex North district"	Manasseh Cutler	Federalist	1801	Incumbent retired. Federalist hold.	▌ ✓ Jeremiah Nelson (Federalist) 56.8%; ▌Thomas Kitteridge (Democratic-Republican) 43.2%
Massachusetts 4 "Middlesex district"	Joseph Bradley Varnum	Democratic- Republican	1794	Incumbent re-elected.	▌ ✓ Joseph Bradley Varnum (Democratic-Republican) 71.5%; ▌Timothy Bigelow (Federalist) 28.0%
Massachusetts 5 "Hampshire South district"	Thomas Dwight	Federalist	1803	Incumbent retired. Federalist hold.	▌ ✓ William Ely (Federalist) 62.9%; ▌Samuel Fowler (Democratic-Republican) 36.7%
Massachusetts 6 "Hampshire North district"	Samuel Taggart	Federalist	1803	Incumbent re-elected.	▌ ✓ Samuel Taggart (Federalist) 69.3%; ▌Solomon Snead (Democratic-Republican) 30.5%
Massachusetts 7 "Plymouth district"	Nahum Mitchell	Federalist	1803	Incumbent lost re-election. Democratic-Republican gain.	▌ ✓ Joseph Barker (Democratic-Republican) 60.4%; ▌Nahum Mitchell (Federalist) 38.3%; Others 1.3%
Massachusetts 8 "Barnstable district"	Lemuel Williams	Federalist	1798	Incumbent lost re-election. Democratic-Republican gain.	▌ ✓ Isaiah L. Green (Democratic-Republican) 60.1%; ▌Lemuel Williams (Federalist) 39.4%
Massachusetts 9 "Bristol district"	Phanuel Bishop	Democratic- Republican	1798	Incumbent re-elected.	▌ ✓ Phanuel Bishop (Democratic-Republican) 62.2%; ▌Nicholas Tillinghast (Federalist) 30.8%; ▌Josiah Deane (Democratic-Republican) 3.4%; ▌John Bowers (Federalist) 3.4%
Massachusetts 10 "Worcester South district"	Seth Hastings	Federalist	1801 (special)	Incumbent re-elected.	▌ ✓ Seth Hastings (Federalist) 51.2%; ▌Edward Bangs (Democratic-Republican) 48.8%
Massachusetts 11 "Worcester North district"	William Stedman	Federalist	1803	Incumbent re-elected.	▌ ✓ William Stedman (Federalist) 60.8%; ▌John Whiting (Democratic-Republican) 39.0%
Massachusetts 12 "Berkshire district"	Simon Larned	Democratic- Republican	1804 (special)	Incumbent retired. Democratic-Republican hold.	▌ ✓ Barnabas Bidwell (Democratic-Republican) 59.7%; ▌Daniel Dewey (Federalist) 40.3%
Massachusetts 13 "Norfolk district"	Ebenezer Seaver	Democratic- Republican	1803	Incumbent re-elected.	▌ ✓ Ebenezer Seaver (Democratic-Republican) 64.6%; ▌Thomas B. Adams (Federalist) 35.0%
Massachusetts 14 District of Maine "York district"	Richard Cutts	Democratic- Republican	1801	Incumbent re-elected.	▌ ✓ Richard Cutts (Democratic-Republican) 51.9%; ▌Joseph Leland (Federalist) 31.4%; ▌Daniel Cleaves (Democratic-Republican) 16.7%
Massachusetts 15 District of Maine "Cumberland district"	Peleg Wadsworth	Federalist	1792	Incumbent re-elected.	▌ ✓ Peleg Wadsworth (Federalist) 63.8%; ▌William Widgery (Democratic-Republican) 19.1%; ▌Isaac Parsons (Democratic-Republican) 17.1%
Massachusetts 16 District of Maine "Lincoln district"	Samuel Thatcher	Federalist	1802 (special)	Incumbent lost re-election. Democratic-Republican gain.	▌ ✓ Orchard Cook (Democratic-Republican) 54.6%; ▌Samuel Thatcher (Federalist) 45.4%
Massachusetts 17 District of Maine "Kennebec district"	Phineas Bruce	Federalist	1803	Incumbent retired. Democratic-Republican gain.	▌ ✓ John Chandler (Democratic-Republican) 64.5%; ▌Benjamin Whitwell (Federalist) 35.5%

== Mississippi Territory ==
See Non-voting delegates, below.

== New Hampshire ==
District	Incumbent	Party	First elected	Result	Candidates
New Hampshire at-large 5 seats on a general ticket	Silas Betton	Federalist	1802	Incumbent re-elected.	▌ ✓ Samuel Tenney (Federalist) 10.4%; ▌ ✓ David Hough (Federalist) 10.4%; ▌ ✓ Thomas W. Thompson (Federalist) 10.4%; ▌ ✓ Silas Betton (Federalist) 10.4%; ▌ ✓ Caleb Ellis (Federalist) 10.4%; ▌Nahum Parker (Democratic-Republican) 9.7%; ▌Ezra Bartlett (Democratic-Republican) 9.6%; ▌Thomas Cogswell (Democratic-Republican) 9.6%; ▌Clement Storer (Democratic-Republican) 9.6%; ▌Jedediah K. Smith (Democratic-Republican) 9.6%
New Hampshire at-large 5 seats on a general ticket	Samuel Hunt	Federalist	1802	Incumbent retired. Federalist hold.	▌ ✓ Samuel Tenney (Federalist) 10.4%; ▌ ✓ David Hough (Federalist) 10.4%; ▌ ✓ Thomas W. Thompson (Federalist) 10.4%; ▌ ✓ Silas Betton (Federalist) 10.4%; ▌ ✓ Caleb Ellis (Federalist) 10.4%; ▌Nahum Parker (Democratic-Republican) 9.7%; ▌Ezra Bartlett (Democratic-Republican) 9.6%; ▌Thomas Cogswell (Democratic-Republican) 9.6%; ▌Clement Storer (Democratic-Republican) 9.6%; ▌Jedediah K. Smith (Democratic-Republican) 9.6%
New Hampshire at-large 5 seats on a general ticket	Samuel Tenney	Federalist	1800	Incumbent re-elected.	▌ ✓ Samuel Tenney (Federalist) 10.4%; ▌ ✓ David Hough (Federalist) 10.4%; ▌ ✓ Thomas W. Thompson (Federalist) 10.4%; ▌ ✓ Silas Betton (Federalist) 10.4%; ▌ ✓ Caleb Ellis (Federalist) 10.4%; ▌Nahum Parker (Democratic-Republican) 9.7%; ▌Ezra Bartlett (Democratic-Republican) 9.6%; ▌Thomas Cogswell (Democratic-Republican) 9.6%; ▌Clement Storer (Democratic-Republican) 9.6%; ▌Jedediah K. Smith (Democratic-Republican) 9.6%
New Hampshire at-large 5 seats on a general ticket	David Hough	Federalist	1802	Incumbent re-elected.	▌ ✓ Samuel Tenney (Federalist) 10.4%; ▌ ✓ David Hough (Federalist) 10.4%; ▌ ✓ Thomas W. Thompson (Federalist) 10.4%; ▌ ✓ Silas Betton (Federalist) 10.4%; ▌ ✓ Caleb Ellis (Federalist) 10.4%; ▌Nahum Parker (Democratic-Republican) 9.7%; ▌Ezra Bartlett (Democratic-Republican) 9.6%; ▌Thomas Cogswell (Democratic-Republican) 9.6%; ▌Clement Storer (Democratic-Republican) 9.6%; ▌Jedediah K. Smith (Democratic-Republican) 9.6%
New Hampshire at-large 5 seats on a general ticket	Clifton Clagett	Federalist	1802	Incumbent retired. Federalist hold.	▌ ✓ Samuel Tenney (Federalist) 10.4%; ▌ ✓ David Hough (Federalist) 10.4%; ▌ ✓ Thomas W. Thompson (Federalist) 10.4%; ▌ ✓ Silas Betton (Federalist) 10.4%; ▌ ✓ Caleb Ellis (Federalist) 10.4%; ▌Nahum Parker (Democratic-Republican) 9.7%; ▌Ezra Bartlett (Democratic-Republican) 9.6%; ▌Thomas Cogswell (Democratic-Republican) 9.6%; ▌Clement Storer (Democratic-Republican) 9.6%; ▌Jedediah K. Smith (Democratic-Republican) 9.6%

== New Jersey ==
The Federalist ticket was announced only a week before the election, with no active campaigning.

District	Incumbent	Party	First elected	Result	Candidates
New Jersey at-large 6 seats on a general ticket	Adam Boyd	Democratic-Republican	1803	Incumbent retired. Democratic-Republican hold.	▌ ✓ Henry Southard (Democratic-Republican) 16.6%; ▌ ✓ Ebenezer Elmer (Democratic-Republican) 16.6%; ▌ ✓ John Lambert (Democratic-Republican) 16.6%; ▌ ✓ William Helms (Democratic-Republican) 16.6%; ▌ ✓ James Sloan (Democratic-Republican) 16.4%; ▌ ✓ Ezra Darby (Democratic-Republican) 16.4%; ▌Aaron Ogden (Federalist) 0.2%; ▌Peter DeVroom (Federalist) 0.2%; ▌Franklin Davenport (Federalist) 0.1%; ▌James H. Imlay (Federalist) 0.1%; ▌Lambert Cadwalader (Federalist) 0.1%; ▌William Colfax (Federalist) 0.1%
New Jersey at-large 6 seats on a general ticket	Ebenezer Elmer	Democratic-Republican	1800	Incumbent re-elected.	
New Jersey at-large 6 seats on a general ticket	William Helms	Democratic-Republican	1800	Incumbent re-elected.	
New Jersey at-large 6 seats on a general ticket	James Mott	Democratic-Republican	1800	Incumbent retired. Democratic-Republican hold.	
New Jersey at-large 6 seats on a general ticket	Henry Southard	Democratic-Republican	1800	Incumbent re-elected.	
New Jersey at-large 6 seats on a general ticket	James Sloan	Democratic-Republican	1803	Incumbent re-elected.	

== New York ==
New York held elections for the 9th Congress on April 24–26, 1804. For this year and the next election year, the 2nd and 3rd districts had combined returns, effectively a plural district with 2 seats, though still numbered as separate districts. At the time, District 2 consisted of only part of New York County, while District 3 consisted of the remainder of New York County plus Kings and Richmond Counties. By consolidating the two, it ensured that New York County would be combined into a single district.

District	Incumbent	Party	First elected	Result	Candidates
New York 1	John Smith	Democratic-Republican	1799 (special)	Incumbent resigned February 22, 1804. Democratic-Republican hold.	▌ ✓ Eliphalet Wickes (Democratic-Republican) 35.8%; ▌Samuel Riker (Democratic-Republican) 35.6%; ▌Joshua Smith (Federalist) 28.6%
New York 2 and New York 3 Joint ticket	Samuel L. Mitchill	Democratic-Republican	1800	Incumbent re-elected but later resigned to become a U.S. Senator, triggering a special election; see above.	▌ ✓ Samuel L. Mitchill (Democratic-Republican) 27.8%; ▌ ✓ Daniel D. Tompkins (Democratic-Republican) 27.7%; ▌Nicholas Fish (Federalist) 22.3%; ▌Wynandt Van Zandt (Federalist) 22.2%
New York 2 and New York 3 Joint ticket	Joshua Sands	Federalist	1802	Incumbent retired. New member elected but declined the seat to become associate justice of the state supreme court. Democratic-Republican gain.	▌ ✓ Samuel L. Mitchill (Democratic-Republican) 27.8%; ▌ ✓ Daniel D. Tompkins (Democratic-Republican) 27.7%; ▌Nicholas Fish (Federalist) 22.3%; ▌Wynandt Van Zandt (Federalist) 22.2%
New York 4	Philip Van Cortlandt	Democratic-Republican	1793	Incumbent re-elected.	▌ ✓ Philip Van Cortlandt (Democratic-Republican) 64.8%; ▌John Herring (Democratic-Republican) 35.2%
New York 5	Andrew McCord	Democratic-Republican	1802	Incumbent retired. Democratic-Republican hold.	▌ ✓ John Blake Jr. (Democratic-Republican) 63.1%; ▌David M. Westcott (Federalist) 36.9%
New York 6	Daniel C. Verplanck	Democratic-Republican	1803 (special)	Incumbent re-elected.	▌ ✓ Daniel C. Verplanck (Democratic-Republican) 58.0%; ▌Benjamin Akin (Federalist) 42.0%
New York 7	Josiah Hasbrouck	Democratic-Republican	1803 (special)	Incumbent retired. Democratic-Republican hold.	▌ ✓ Martin G. Schuneman (Democratic-Republican) 60.0%; ▌Gerrit Abeel (Federalist) 40.0%
New York 8	Henry W. Livingston	Federalist	1802	Incumbent re-elected.	▌ ✓ Henry W. Livingston (Federalist) 54.8%; ▌Edward P. Livingston (Democratic-Republican) 45.2%
New York 9	Killian Van Rensselaer	Federalist	1800	Incumbent re-elected.	▌ ✓ Killian Van Rensselaer (Federalist) 56.4%; ▌David McCarty (Democratic-Republican) 43.6%
New York 10	George Tibbits	Federalist	1802	Incumbent retired. Democratic-Republican gain.	▌ ✓ Josiah Masters (Democratic-Republican) 55.4%; ▌Jonathan Brown (Federalist) 44.6%
New York 11	Beriah Palmer	Democratic-Republican	1802	Incumbent retired. Democratic-Republican hold.	▌ ✓ Peter Sailly (Democratic-Republican) 100%
New York 12	David Thomas	Democratic-Republican	1800	Incumbent re-elected.	▌ ✓ David Thomas (Democratic-Republican) 70.3%; ▌Reuben Skinner (Federalist) 29.7%
New York 13	Thomas Sammons	Democratic-Republican	1802	Incumbent re-elected.	▌ ✓ Thomas Sammons (Democratic-Republican) 100%
New York 14	Erastus Root	Democratic-Republican	1802	Incumbent lost re-election. Democratic-Republican hold.	▌ ✓ John Russell (Democratic-Republican) 85.8%; ▌Benjamin Gilbert (Federalist) 6.0%; ▌Solomon Martin (Federalist) 3.6%; ▌Erastus Root (Democratic-Republican) 3.6%; ▌Thomas R. Gold (Federalist) 1.0%
New York 15	Gaylord Griswold	Federalist	1802	Incumbent retired. Democratic-Republican gain.	▌ ✓ Nathan Williams (Democratic-Republican) 57.4%; ▌Thomas R. Gold (Federalist) 42.6%
New York 16	John Paterson	Democratic-Republican	1802	Incumbent retired. Democratic-Republican hold.	▌ ✓ Uri Tracy (Democratic-Republican) 62.8%; ▌Edward Edwards (Federalist) 37.2%
New York 17	Oliver Phelps	Democratic-Republican	1802	Incumbent retired. Democratic-Republican hold.	▌ ✓ Silas Halsey (Democratic-Republican) 40.4%; ▌Nathaniel W. Howell (Federalist) 37.5%; ▌Joseph Grover (Democratic-Republican) 11.2%; ▌Peter Hughes (Democratic-Republican) 10.8%

== North Carolina ==
District	Incumbent	Party	First elected	Result	Candidates
North Carolina 1	Thomas Wynns	Democratic-Republican	1802 (special)	Incumbent re-elected.	▌ ✓ Thomas Wynns (Democratic-Republican); ▌Thomas Harvey (Unknown)
North Carolina 2	Willis Alston	Democratic-Republican	1798	Incumbent re-elected.	▌ ✓ Willis Alston (Democratic-Republican) 66.6%; ▌John Binford (Federalist) 20.7%; ▌William R. Davie (Federalist) 12.7%
North Carolina 3	William Kennedy	Democratic-Republican	1803	Incumbent lost re-election. Democratic-Republican hold.	▌ ✓ Thomas Blount (Democratic-Republican) 51.4%; ▌William Kennedy (Democratic-Republican) 48.6%
North Carolina 4	William Blackledge	Democratic-Republican	1803	Incumbent re-elected.	▌ ✓ William Blackledge (Democratic-Republican) 96.6%; ▌John Stanly (Federalist) 3.4%
North Carolina 5	James Gillespie	Democratic-Republican	1793; 1803	Incumbent re-elected. Gillespie died January 5, 1805, triggering a special election.	▌ ✓ James Gillespie (Democratic-Republican) 52.5%; ▌Benjamin Smith (Federalist) 40.2%; ▌Samuel Ashe (Democratic-Republican) 7.3%
North Carolina 6	Nathaniel Macon	Democratic-Republican	1791	Incumbent re-elected.	▌ ✓ Nathaniel Macon (Democratic-Republican) 99.9%
North Carolina 7	Samuel D. Purviance	Federalist	1803	Incumbent retired. Democratic-Republican gain.	▌ ✓ Duncan McFarlan (Democratic-Republican) 36.8%; ▌Joseph Pickett (Federalist) 31.7%; ▌William Martin (Federalist) 31.1%
North Carolina 8	Richard Stanford	Democratic-Republican	1796	Incumbent re-elected.	▌ ✓ Richard Stanford (Democratic-Republican); ▌Duncan Cameron (Unknown); ▌Archibald Murphey (Unknown); ▌John Hinton Jr. (Unknown) (Note: Source does not give complete results, but partial results suggest a very large majority)
North Carolina 9	Marmaduke Williams	Democratic-Republican	1803	Incumbent re-elected.	▌ ✓ Marmaduke Williams (Democratic-Republican) 98.9%; ▌Theophilus Lacey (Democratic-Republican) 1.0%
North Carolina 10	Nathaniel Alexander	Democratic-Republican	1803	Incumbent re-elected.	▌ ✓ Nathaniel Alexander (Democratic-Republican)
North Carolina 11	James Holland	Democratic-Republican	1800	Incumbent re-elected.	▌ ✓ James Holland (Democratic-Republican) 100%
North Carolina 12	Joseph Winston	Democratic-Republican	1803	Incumbent re-elected.	▌ ✓ Joseph Winston (Democratic-Republican) 57.0%; ▌Meshack Franklin (Democratic-Republican) 43.0%

== Ohio ==
District	Incumbent	Party	First elected	Result	Candidates
Ohio at-large	Jeremiah Morrow	Democratic-Republican	1803	Incumbent re-elected.	▌ ✓ Jeremiah Morrow (Democratic-Republican) 70.2%; ▌Elias Langham (Federalist) 29.4%; ▌Rufus Putnam (Unknown) 0.4%

== Pennsylvania ==
District	Incumbent	Party	First elected	Result	Candidates
Pennsylvania 1 Plural district with 3 seats	Joseph Clay	Democratic-Republican	1802	Incumbent re-elected.	▌ ✓ Joseph Clay (Democratic-Republican) 33.6%; ▌ ✓ Jacob Richards (Democratic-Republican) 31.7%; ▌ ✓ Michael Leib (Democratic-Republican) 18.0%; ▌William Penrose (Federalist) 16.7%
Pennsylvania 1 Plural district with 3 seats	Jacob Richards	Democratic-Republican	1802	Incumbent re-elected.	▌ ✓ Joseph Clay (Democratic-Republican) 33.6%; ▌ ✓ Jacob Richards (Democratic-Republican) 31.7%; ▌ ✓ Michael Leib (Democratic-Republican) 18.0%; ▌William Penrose (Federalist) 16.7%
Pennsylvania 1 Plural district with 3 seats	Michael Leib	Democratic-Republican	1798	Incumbent re-elected.	▌ ✓ Joseph Clay (Democratic-Republican) 33.6%; ▌ ✓ Jacob Richards (Democratic-Republican) 31.7%; ▌ ✓ Michael Leib (Democratic-Republican) 18.0%; ▌William Penrose (Federalist) 16.7%
Pennsylvania 2 Plural district with 3 seats	Robert Brown	Democratic-Republican	1798 (special)	Incumbent re-elected.	▌ ✓ John Pugh (Democratic-Republican) 32.2%; ▌ ✓ Frederick Conrad (Democratic-Republican) 31.7%; ▌ ✓ Robert Brown (Democratic-Republican) 21.8%; ▌John Ross (Quid) 13.0%; ▌Samuel Preston (Quid) 1.3%
Pennsylvania 2 Plural district with 3 seats	Frederick Conrad	Democratic-Republican	1802	Incumbent re-elected.	▌ ✓ John Pugh (Democratic-Republican) 32.2%; ▌ ✓ Frederick Conrad (Democratic-Republican) 31.7%; ▌ ✓ Robert Brown (Democratic-Republican) 21.8%; ▌John Ross (Quid) 13.0%; ▌Samuel Preston (Quid) 1.3%
Pennsylvania 2 Plural district with 3 seats	Isaac Van Horne	Democratic-Republican	1801 (special)	Incumbent retired. Democratic-Republican hold.	▌ ✓ John Pugh (Democratic-Republican) 32.2%; ▌ ✓ Frederick Conrad (Democratic-Republican) 31.7%; ▌ ✓ Robert Brown (Democratic-Republican) 21.8%; ▌John Ross (Quid) 13.0%; ▌Samuel Preston (Quid) 1.3%
Pennsylvania 3 Plural district with 3 seats	Isaac Anderson	Democratic-Republican	1802	Incumbent re-elected.	▌ ✓ Christian Lower (Democratic-Republican) 33.1%; ▌ ✓ John Whitehill (Democratic-Republican) 23.0%; ▌ ✓ Isaac Anderson (Democratic-Republican) 22.9%; ▌Thomas Boude (Federalist) 10.7%; ▌Isaac Wayne (Federalist) 10.3%
Pennsylvania 3 Plural district with 3 seats	Joseph Hiester	Democratic-Republican	1797 (special)	Incumbent retired. Democratic-Republican hold.	▌ ✓ Christian Lower (Democratic-Republican) 33.1%; ▌ ✓ John Whitehill (Democratic-Republican) 23.0%; ▌ ✓ Isaac Anderson (Democratic-Republican) 22.9%; ▌Thomas Boude (Federalist) 10.7%; ▌Isaac Wayne (Federalist) 10.3%
Pennsylvania 3 Plural district with 3 seats	John Whitehill	Democratic-Republican	1802	Incumbent re-elected.	▌ ✓ Christian Lower (Democratic-Republican) 33.1%; ▌ ✓ John Whitehill (Democratic-Republican) 23.0%; ▌ ✓ Isaac Anderson (Democratic-Republican) 22.9%; ▌Thomas Boude (Federalist) 10.7%; ▌Isaac Wayne (Federalist) 10.3%
Pennsylvania 4 Plural district with 2 seats	John A. Hanna	Democratic-Republican	1796	Incumbent re-elected, but died July 23, 1805	▌ ✓ David Bard (Democratic-Republican) 34.6%; ▌ ✓ John A. Hanna (Democratic-Republican) 31.2%; ▌Oliver Pollock (Democratic-Republican) 18.1%; ▌Robert Mitchell (Democratic-Republican) 16.1%
Pennsylvania 4 Plural district with 2 seats	David Bard	Democratic-Republican	1802	Incumbent re-elected.	▌ ✓ David Bard (Democratic-Republican) 34.6%; ▌ ✓ John A. Hanna (Democratic-Republican) 31.2%; ▌Oliver Pollock (Democratic-Republican) 18.1%; ▌Robert Mitchell (Democratic-Republican) 16.1%
Pennsylvania 5	Andrew Gregg	Democratic-Republican	1791	Incumbent re-elected.	▌ ✓ Andrew Gregg (Democratic-Republican) 100%
Pennsylvania 6	John Stewart	Democratic-Republican	1800	Incumbent lost re-election. Federalist gain.	▌ ✓ James Kelly (Federalist) 58.5%; ▌John Stewart (Democratic-Republican) 41.5%
Pennsylvania 7	John Rea	Democratic-Republican	1802	Incumbent re-elected.	▌ ✓ John Rea (Democratic-Republican) 100%
Pennsylvania 8	William Findley	Democratic-Republican	1802	Incumbent re-elected.	▌ ✓ William Findley (Democratic-Republican) 64.7%; ▌John Brandon (Federalist) 35.3%
Pennsylvania 9	John Smilie	Democratic-Republican	1792; 1794 (retired); 1798	Incumbent re-elected.	▌ ✓ John Smilie (Democratic-Republican) 100%
Pennsylvania 10	William Hoge	Democratic-Republican	1801 (special)	Incumbent retired. Democratic-Republican hold.	▌ ✓ John Hamilton (Democratic-Republican); ▌John Israel (Federalist) (Note: Source did not have returns for Israel.)
Pennsylvania 11	John Lucas	Democratic-Republican	1802	Incumbent re-elected, but resigned before the start of the Congress. Successor elected in a special election.	▌ ✓ John Lucas (Democratic-Republican) 64.8%; ▌James O'Hara (Federalist) 35.2%

== Rhode Island ==
District	Incumbent	Party	First elected	Result	Candidates
Rhode Island at-large 2 seats on a general ticket	Nehemiah Knight	Democratic-Republican	1802	Incumbent re-elected.	▌ ✓ Nehemiah Knight (Democratic-Republican) 49.9%; ▌ ✓ Joseph Stanton Jr. (Democratic-Republican) 49.5%
Rhode Island at-large 2 seats on a general ticket	Joseph Stanton Jr.	Democratic-Republican	1800	Incumbent re-elected.	▌ ✓ Nehemiah Knight (Democratic-Republican) 49.9%; ▌ ✓ Joseph Stanton Jr. (Democratic-Republican) 49.5%

== South Carolina ==
District	Incumbent	Party	First elected	Result	Candidates
South Carolina 1 "Charleston district"	Thomas Lowndes	Federalist	1800	Incumbent retired. Democratic-Republican gain.	▌ ✓ Robert Marion (Democratic-Republican) 60.6%; ▌Thomas L. Smith (Federalist) 37.0%; Scattering 2.4%
South Carolina 2 "Beaufort and Edgefield district"	William Butler Sr.	Democratic-Republican	1800	Incumbent re-elected.	▌ ✓ William Butler Sr. (Democratic-Republican) 100%
South Carolina 3 "Georgetown district"	Benjamin Huger	Federalist	1798	Incumbent retired. Democratic-Republican gain.	▌ ✓ David R. Williams (Democratic-Republican) 58.0%; ▌Robert Witherspoon (Democratic-Republican) 29.0%; ▌Joseph Blyth (Democratic-Republican) 13.0%
South Carolina 4 "Orangeburgh district"	Wade Hampton	Democratic-Republican	1803	Incumbent retired. Democratic-Republican hold.	▌ ✓ O'Brien Smith (Democratic-Republican); ▌John Taylor (Democratic-Republican)
South Carolina 5 "Sumter district"	Richard Winn	Democratic-Republican	1802 (special)	Incumbent re-elected.	▌ ✓ Richard Winn (Democratic-Republican); ▌John Kershaw (Unknown)
South Carolina 6 "Abbeville district"	Levi Casey	Democratic-Republican	1803	Incumbent re-elected.	▌ ✓ Levi Casey (Democratic-Republican) 100%
South Carolina 7 "Chester district"	Thomas Moore	Democratic-Republican	1800	Incumbent re-elected.	▌ ✓ Thomas Moore (Democratic-Republican) 100%
South Carolina 8 "Pendleton district"	John B. Earle	Democratic-Republican	1803	Incumbent re-elected but resigned March 3, 1805, triggering a special election.	▌ ✓ John B. Earle (Democratic-Republican) 100%

== Tennessee ==
Beginning with the 9th Congress, Tennessee was divided into 3 districts.

District	Incumbent	Party	First elected	Result	Candidates
Tennessee 1 "Washington district"	John Rhea; Redistricted from the at-large district	Democratic-Republican	1803	Incumbent re-elected.	▌ ✓ John Rhea (Democratic-Republican); Uncontested
Tennessee 2 "Hamilton district"	George W. Campbell; Redistricted from the at-large district	Democratic-Republican	1803	Incumbent re-elected.	▌ ✓ George W. Campbell (Democratic-Republican); Uncontested
Tennessee 3 "Mero district"	William Dickson; Redistricted from the at-large district	Democratic-Republican	1801	Incumbent re-elected.	▌ ✓ William Dickson (Democratic-Republican); Uncontested

== Vermont ==
Vermont required a majority for election, which frequently mandated runoff elections. The 2nd, and 3rd districts both required second elections in this election cycle, and districts both required second elections in this election cyclethe 3rd district required a third election.

District	Incumbent	Party	First elected	Result	Candidates
Vermont 1 "Southwestern district"	Gideon Olin	Democratic-Republican	1802	Incumbent re-elected.	▌ ✓ Gideon Olin (Democratic-Republican) 56.1%; ▌Jonas Galusha (Democratic-Republican) 24.0%; ▌Chauncey Langdon (Federalist) 18.6%; Others 1.4%
Vermont 2 "Southeastern district"	James Elliot	Federalist	1802	Incumbent re-elected.	First ballot (September 4, 1804): ▌James Elliot (Federalist) 41.9%; ▌Samuel Fletcher (Federalist) 15.6%; ▌Mark Richards (Democratic-Republican) 15.5%; ▌Pascal P. Enos (Democratic-Republican) 12.1%; ▌Aaron Leland (Democratic-Republican) 4.3%; ▌Lewis R. Morris (Federalist) 3.1%; ▌Elias Keyes (Democratic-Republican) 2.9%; ▌Paul Brigham (Democratic-Republican) 1.4%; Others 3.1%; Second ballot (December 18, 1804): ▌ ✓ James Elliot (Federalist) 62.0%; ▌Mark Richards (Democratic-Republican) 36.4%; Others 1.6%
Vermont 3 "Northeastern district"	William Chamberlain	Federalist	1802	Incumbent lost re-election. Democratic-Republican gain.	First ballot (September 4, 1804): ▌William Chamberlain (Federalist) 48.0%; ▌James Fisk (Democratic-Republican) 38.4%; ▌Nathaniel Niles (Democratic-Republican) 9.9%; ▌Samuel C. Crafts (Democratic-Republican) 2.6%; Others 1.2%; Second ballot (December 18, 1804): ▌William Chamberlain (Federalist) 49.3%; ▌James Fisk (Democratic-Republican) 49.1%; Others 1.6%; Third ballot (March 25, 1805): ▌ ✓ James Fisk (Democratic-Republican) 56.1%; ▌William Chamberlain (Federalist) 42.7%; Others 1.2%
Vermont 4 "Northwestern district"	Martin Chittenden	Federalist	1802	Incumbent re-elected.	▌ ✓ Martin Chittenden (Federalist) 50.4%; ▌Ezra Butler (Democratic-Republican) 46.7%; Others 3.0%

== Virginia ==
District	Incumbent	Party	First elected	Result	Candidates
Virginia 1	John G. Jackson	Democratic-Republican	1803	Incumbent re-elected.	▌ ✓ John G. Jackson (Democratic-Republican) 57.2%; ▌Thomas Wilson (Federalist) 42.8%
Virginia 2	James Stephenson	Federalist	1803	Incumbent lost re-election. Democratic-Republican gain.	▌ ✓ John Morrow (Democratic-Republican); ▌James Stephenson (Federalist)
Virginia 3	John Smith	Democratic-Republican	1801	Incumbent re-elected.	▌ ✓ John Smith (Democratic-Republican) 100%
Virginia 4	David Holmes	Democratic-Republican	1797	Incumbent re-elected.	▌ ✓ David Holmes (Democratic-Republican) 100%
Virginia 5	Alexander Wilson	Democratic-Republican	1804 (special)	Incumbent re-elected.	▌ ✓ Alexander Wilson (Democratic-Republican) 60.6%; ▌Robert Bailey (D-R Quid) 39.4%
Virginia 6	Abram Trigg	Democratic-Republican	1797	Incumbent re-elected.	▌ ✓ Abram Trigg (Democratic-Republican) 100%
Virginia 7	Joseph Lewis Jr.	Federalist	1803	Incumbent re-elected.	▌ ✓ Joseph Lewis Jr. (Federalist) 54.3%; ▌William Elzey (Democratic-Republican) 45.7%
Virginia 8	Walter Jones	Democratic-Republican	1803	Incumbent re-elected.	▌ ✓ Walter Jones (Democratic-Republican); ▌Henry Lee (Federalist)
Virginia 9	Philip R. Thompson	Democratic-Republican	1793	Incumbent re-elected.	▌ ✓ Philip R. Thompson (Democratic-Republican) 100%
Virginia 10	John Dawson	Democratic-Republican	1797	Incumbent re-elected.	▌ ✓ John Dawson (Democratic-Republican) 66.2%; ▌James Barbour (D-R Quid) 33.8%
Virginia 11	Anthony New	Democratic-Republican	1793	Incumbent retired. Democratic-Republican hold.	▌ ✓ James M. Garnett (Democratic-Republican); ▌Carter Braxton (Unknown); ▌John Roane (Democratic-Republican); ▌John Smith (Unknown); ▌Archibald Ritchie (Unknown)
Virginia 12	Thomas Griffin	Federalist	1803	Incumbent lost re-election. Democratic-Republican gain.	▌ ✓ Burwell Bassett (Democratic-Republican); ▌Thomas Griffin (Federalist)
Virginia 13	Christopher H. Clark	Democratic-Republican	1804 (special)	Incumbent re-elected.	▌ ✓ Christopher H. Clark (Democratic-Republican) 100%
Virginia 14	Matthew Clay	Democratic-Republican	1797	Incumbent re-elected.	▌ ✓ Matthew Clay (Democratic-Republican) 88.9%; ▌William Lewis (Federalist) 11.1%
Virginia 15	John Randolph	Democratic-Republican	1799	Incumbent re-elected as a D-R Quid. D-R Quid gain.	▌ ✓ John Randolph (D-R Quid) 100%
Virginia 16	John W. Eppes	Democratic-Republican	1803	Incumbent re-elected.	▌ ✓ John W. Eppes (Democratic-Republican) 100%
Virginia 17	Thomas Claiborne	Democratic-Republican	1793; 1801	Incumbent retired. Democratic-Republican hold.	▌ ✓ John Claiborne (Democratic-Republican); ▌Mark Alexander (Democratic-Republican)
Virginia 18	Peterson Goodwyn	Democratic-Republican	1803	Incumbent re-elected.	▌ ✓ Peterson Goodwyn (Democratic-Republican) 100%
Virginia 19	Edwin Gray	Democratic-Republican	1799	Incumbent re-elected as a D-R Quid. D-R Quid gain.	▌ ✓ Edwin Gray (D-R Quid) 100%
Virginia 20	Thomas Newton Jr.	Democratic-Republican	1799	Incumbent re-elected.	▌ ✓ Thomas Newton Jr. (Democratic-Republican) 100%
Virginia 21	Thomas M. Randolph	Democratic-Republican	1803	Incumbent re-elected.	▌ ✓ Thomas M. Randolph (Democratic-Republican) 63.7%; ▌Walter Leake (D-R Quid) 36.3%
Virginia 22	John Clopton	Democratic-Republican	1801	Incumbent re-elected.	▌ ✓ John Clopton (Democratic-Republican) 100%

== Non-voting delegates ==
There were three territories with non-voting delegates in the 9th Congress, one of which (the Orleans Territory) did not send its first representative until 1806. The delegates were elected by the territorial legislatures, votes here are the number of members of the territorial legislatures voting for each candidate.

In the Mississippi Territory, the territorial legislature was locked. The first vote given above was on the 7th ballot, after which point the territorial legislature adjourned, the second vote was at a later session of the territorial legislature.

District	Incumbent			This race	
District	Delegate	Party	First elected	Results	Candidates
Indiana Territory at-large	None (new district)			New delegate elected September 11, 1805. Federalist gain. New delegate seated December 12, 1805.	First ballot: ▌Benjamin Parke (Federalist) 5; ▌Thomas J. Davis (Unknown) 5; ▌Jesse B. Thomas (Democratic-Republican) 1; Second ballot: ▌Benjamin Parke (Federalist) 5; ▌Thomas J. Davis (Unknown) 5; ▌Shadrach Bond (Unknown) 1; Third ballot: ▌ ✓ Benjamin Parke (Federalist) 7; ▌Thomas J. Davis (Unknown) 4
Mississippi Territory at-large	William Lattimore	Democratic- Republican	1803	Incumbent re-elected on an unknown date in 1805.	Seventh ballot: ▌William Lattimore (Democratic-Republican) 5; ▌Cato West (Unknown) 5; ▌William Gordon Freeman (Unknown) 4; Eventual decision: ▌ ✓ William Lattimore (Democratic-Republican) 10; ▌Cato West (Unknown) 2; ▌John Ellis (Unknown) 1

== See also ==
- 1804 United States elections
  - List of United States House of Representatives elections (1789–1822)
  - 1804–05 United States Senate elections
  - 1804 United States presidential election
- 9th United States Congress

== Bibliography ==
- "A New Nation Votes: American Election Returns 1787-1825". Tufts Digital Library, Tufts University. Archived from the original on January 29, 2015.
- Dubin, Michael J. (March 1, 1998). United States Congressional Elections, 1788-1997: The Official Results of the Elections of the 1st Through 105th Congresses. McFarland and Company. ISBN 978-0786402830.
- Martis, Kenneth C. (January 1, 1989). The Historical Atlas of Political Parties in the United States Congress, 1789-1989. Macmillan Publishing Company. ISBN 978-0029201701.
- "Party Divisions of the House of Representatives* 1789–Present". Office of the Historian, United States House of Representatives.
- Mapping Early American Elections project team (2019). "Mapping Early American Elections". Roy Rosenzweig Center for History and New Media, George Mason University.
