= Electoral history of John Quincy Adams =

Elections featuring President of the US

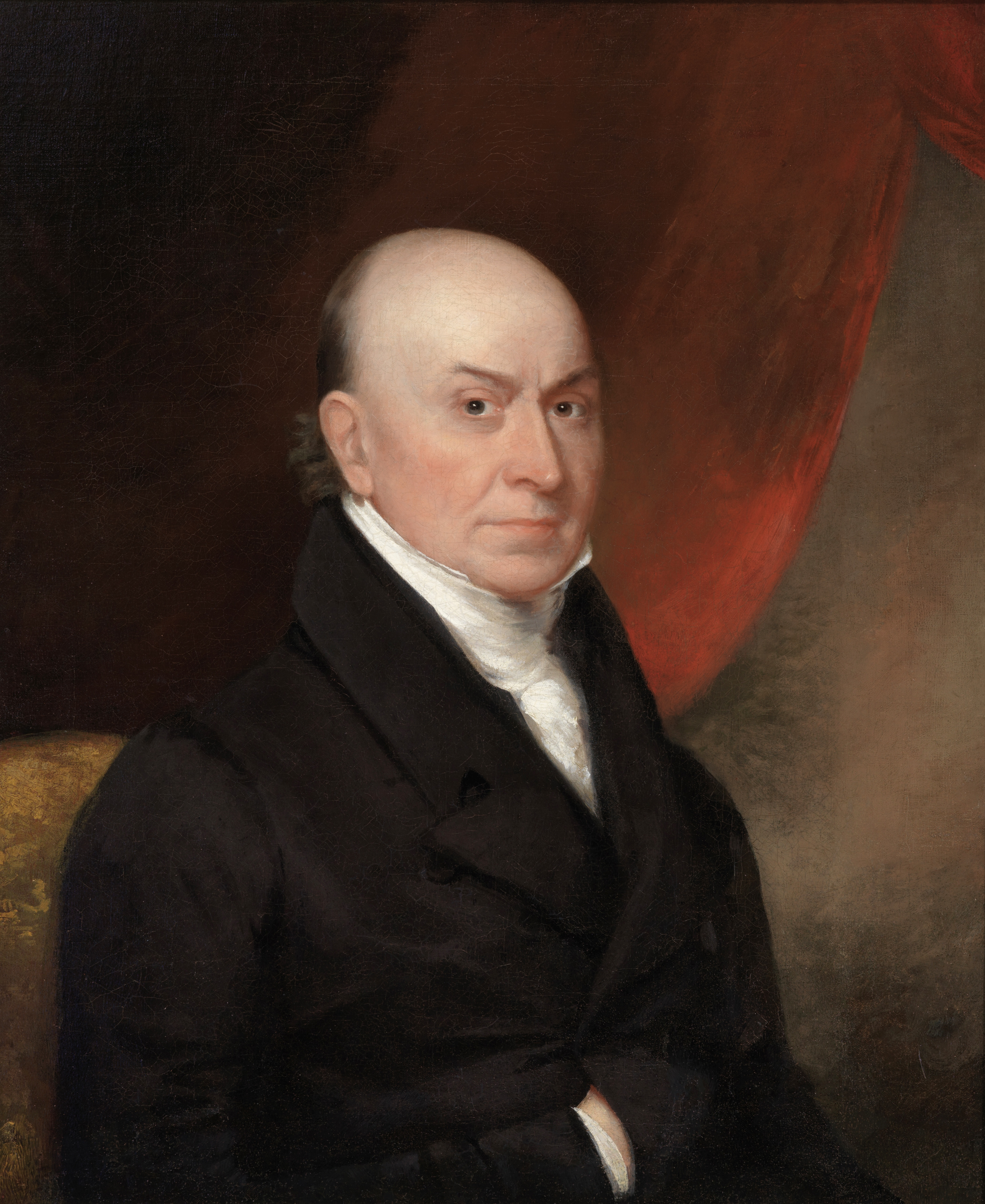
John Quincy Adams

American politician John Quincy Adams served as President of the United States (1825–1829) and United States Secretary of State (1817–1825). Prior to being president, he had served as United States Senator from Massachusetts (1803–1808) and had diplomatic experience as United States Minister to United Kingdom (1815–1817), Russia (1809–1814), Prussia (1797–1801) and the Netherlands (1794–1797). After losing the 1828 presidential election, he served as a member of the U.S. House of Representatives from Massachusetts for 17 years. He is the only American president to be elected to the House of Representatives after leaving office.

== Early political career ==
John Quincy Adams was appointed as United States Minister to the Netherlands and ambassador to the Netherlands by George Washington. He was also appointed as ambassador to Prussia by his father, John Adams. He was elected to the Massachusetts Senate in 1802. He ran for election for the United States House of Representatives from the Suffolk district, but narrowly lost the election. Soon, he resigned from the Massachusetts Senate on his election to the United States Senate from Massachusetts.

== United States Senate elections ==
=== 1803 ===
1803 United States Senate election in Massachusetts State Legislature Results First Ballot
Party	Candidate	Votes	%
Democratic-Republican	Thompson J. Skinner	71	42.0%
Federalist	Timothy Pickering	67	39.6%
Federalist	Nicholas Tillinghast	12	7.1%
Federalist	John Quincy Adams	12	7.1%
Federalist	Henry Knox	7	4.1%
Federalist	Samuel Dexter	1	0.6%
Federalist	William Ely	1	0.6%
Total votes		169	100

1803 United States Senate election in Massachusetts State Legislature Results Second Ballot
Party	Candidate	Votes	%
Federalist	Timothy Pickering	79	46.5%
Democratic-Republican	Thompson J. Skinner	71	41.8%
Federalist	Nicholas Tillinghast	9	5.3%
Federalist	John Quincy Adams	6	3.5%
Federalist	Henry Knox	5	2.9%
Total votes		170	100

1803 United States Senate election in Massachusetts State Legislature Results Third Ballot
Party	Candidate	Votes	%
Democratic-Republican	Thompson J. Skinner	71	41.5%
Federalist	John Quincy Adams	56	32.8%
Federalist	Timothy Pickering	33	19.3%
Federalist	Nicholas Tillinghast	10	5.9%
Federalist	Henry Knox	1	0.6%
Total votes		171	100

1803 United States Senate election in Massachusetts State Legislature Results Fourth Ballot
Party	Candidate	Votes	%
Federalist	John Quincy Adams	86	50.3%
Democratic-Republican	Thompson J. Skinner	70	40.9%
Federalist	Nicholas Tillinghast	9	5.3%
Federalist	Timothy Pickering	6	3.5%
Total votes		171	100

1803 United States Senate election in Massachusetts Ratification by the United States Senate
Party	Candidate	Votes	%
Federalist	John Quincy Adams	19	100
Total votes		19	100

=== 1808 ===
1808 United States Senate election in Massachusetts
Party	Candidate	Votes	%
Federalist	James Lloyd Jr.	248	53.7%
Federalist	John Quincy Adams	213	46.1%
Federalist	Laban Wheaton	1	0.2%
Total votes		462	100

=== 1841 ===
1841 United States Senate election in Massachusetts
Party	Candidate	Votes	%
Whig	Isaac C. Bates	280	69.1%
Democratic	Marcus Morton	119	29.4%
Whig	John Quincy Adams	3	0.7%
Whig	George N. Briggs	1	0.3%
Whig	Levi Lincoln Jr.	1	0.3%
Whig	Franklin Dexter	1	0.3%
Total votes		405	100

== Subsequent positions (1808–1824) ==
After losing the senate election in 1808, he was appointed United States Minister to Russia, serving from 1809 to 1814, and then United States Minister to United Kingdom, serving from 1815 to 1817, by James Madison. He duly reported on Napoleon's failed invasion, and among various other events. He headed the Commission that negotiated the Treaty of Ghent in 1814, which ended the War of 1812 with Great Britain. He then served as Secretary of State under James Monroe from 1817 to 1825. As Secretary of State, his views about territorial expansion guided President Monroe's policies. His diplomacy with Spain led to the Adams–Onís Treaty of 1819. Monroe Doctrine reflected various of Adams's political views.

== Presidential elections ==
=== 1824 ===
Immediately upon becoming Secretary of State, Adams emerged as one of Monroe's most likely successors for presidency. Since the Federalist Party had collapsed, all the major contenders for presidency were from Democratic-Republican party. His initial choice for vice presidential candidate was Andrew Jackson, but as the election approached, Jackson entered the race for president. Adams was nominated by Massachusetts legislature as presidential candidate.

==== Popular vote and electoral vote ====
Electoral college map for the 1824 United States presidential election.

The election of 1824 was the only election in American history in which no presidential candidate received a majority of the votes in the electoral college. Andrew Jackson received 99 electoral votes but was 32 votes short of the amount needed to reach a majority. He won the largest number of popular votes. William H. Crawford received 41 electoral votes, and Henry Clay received 37.

Presidential candidate	Party	Home state	Popular vote (Note: The popular vote figures exclude Delaware, Georgia, Louisiana, New York, South Carolina, and Vermont. In all of these states, the Electors were chosen by the state legislatures rather than by popular vote.)		Electoral vote
Presidential candidate	Party	Home state	Count	Percentage	Electoral vote
Andrew Jackson (Note: Jackson was nominated by the Tennessee state legislature and by the Democratic Party of Pennsylvania.)	Democratic-Republican	Tennessee	151,271	41.4%	99
John Quincy Adams (Note: Adams was nominated by the Massachusetts state legislature.)	Democratic-Republican	Massachusetts	113,122	30.9%	84
William Harris Crawford (Note: Crawford was nominated by a caucus of 66 congressmen that called itself the "Democratic members of Congress".)	Democratic-Republican	Georgia	40,856	11.2%	41
Henry Clay (Note: Clay was nominated by the Kentucky state legislature.)	Democratic-Republican	Kentucky	47,531	13.0%	37
Unpledged electors	None	Massachusetts	6,616	1.8%	0
Other			6,437	1.7%	0
Total			365,833	100.0%	261
Needed to win					131

==== Contingent election ====
Map of House of Representatives delegation votes

Since no candidate received a clear majority votes in electoral college, the responsibility for electing a new president devolved upon the U.S. House of Representatives, which held a contingent election on February 9, 1825. As prescribed in the 12th Amendment, the top three candidates in electoral college vote would be eligible to receive state delegation votes, and the remaining candidates would be eliminated, accordingly, Henry Clay was eliminated. Henry Clay, the Speaker of the House was highly influential. By contrast, Clay viewed Jackson as a dangerous demagogue, and he was unwilling to support Crawford due to the latter's health issues. Adams and Clay met before the contingent election, and Clay agreed to support Adams in the election. Thus, Adams was elected president on the first ballot.

1825 contingent presidential election vote distribution
States for Adams	States for Jackson	States for Crawford
Connecticut; Illinois; Kentucky; Louisiana; Maine; Maryland; Massachusetts; Missouri; New Hampshire; New York; Ohio; Rhode Island; Vermont	Alabama; Indiana; Mississippi; New Jersey; Pennsylvania; South Carolina; Tennessee	Delaware; Georgia; North Carolina; Virginia
Total: 13 (54%)	Total: 7 (29%)	Total: 4 (17%)

=== 1828 ===
Electoral college map for the 1828 United States presidential election.

The 1828 presidential election was a rematch between incumbent president Adams and Andrew Jackson. Adams had selected Richard Rush as his vice presidential running mate in the Anti-Jacksonian Party ticket. Andrew Jackson was nominated by Jacksonian Party ticket with John C. Calhoun as his running mate. Adams lost to Jackson in a landslide, and was able to win only those states which his father John Adams had won in the 1800 presidential election. Adams did not attend Jackson's inauguration, making him one of only four presidents who finished their terms but chose to skip the event.

Electoral results
Presidential candidate	Party	Home state	Popular vote^{(a)}		Electoral vote	Running mate		
Presidential candidate	Party	Home state	Count	Percentage	Electoral vote	Vice-presidential candidate	Home state	Electoral vote
Andrew Jackson	Democratic	Tennessee	638,348	55.3%	178	John Caldwell Calhoun (incumbent)	South Carolina	171
Andrew Jackson	Democratic	Tennessee	638,348	55.3%	178	William Smith	South Carolina	7
John Quincy Adams (incumbent)	National Republican	Massachusetts	507,440	44.0%	83	Richard Rush	Pennsylvania	83
Other			7,991^{(b)}	0.7%	—	Other		—
Total			1,153,779	100%	261			261
Needed to win					131			131

== House of Representatives elections ==
Adams contested his first election for House of Representatives in 1802, in which he narrowly lost to William Eustis. After his presidency, he contested the election for House of Representatives from Massachusetts's 11th congressional district. He won the election in a landslide, and wrote in his diary that "my election as President of the United States was not half so gratifying to my inmost soul. No election or appointment conferred upon me ever gave me so much pleasure." He was sworn in on December 5, 1831, and seven days later was appointed chairman of the Committee of Manufactures. He is the only President to be elected in House of Representatives after leaving office. He served nine post-presidential terms in Congress from 1830 until his death in 1848, usually voting in the minority. He supported the rechartering of the Bank of the United States, opposed the annexation of Texas and the war with Mexico.

=== 1802 ===
1802 United States House of Representatives election in Massachusetts Massachusetts-1 (Suffolk)
Party	Candidate	Votes	%
Democratic-Republican	William Eustis	1,898	50.8%
Federalist	John Quincy Adams	1,839	49.2%
Total votes		3,737	100

=== 1830 ===
1830 United States House of Representatives election in Massachusetts Massachusetts-11
Party	Candidate	Votes	%
Anti-Jacksonian	John Quincy Adams	1,811	74.8%
Jacksonian	Ara Tompason	378	15.6%
Unknown	William Baylies	233	9.6%
Total votes		2,422	100

=== 1832–33 ===
1832 United States House of Representatives election in Massachusetts Massachusetts-12
Party	Candidate	Votes	%
Anti-Masonic	John Quincy Adams	2,592	78.4%
Jacksonian	Jedediah Lincoln	714	21.6%
Total votes		3,306	100

=== 1834–35 ===
1834 United States House of Representatives election in Massachusetts Massachusetts-12
Party	Candidate	Votes	%
Anti-Masonic	John Quincy Adams	3,234	86.3%
Unknown	Write-in candidates	337	9.0%
Unknown	Abel Cushing	117	4.7%
Total votes		3,688	100

=== 1836–37 ===
1836 United States House of Representatives election in Massachusetts Massachusetts-12
Party	Candidate	Votes	%
Whig	John Quincy Adams	3,125	83.3%
Democratic	Solomon Lincoln	260	6.9%
Unknown	John Thomas	222	5.9%
Unknown	Write-in candidates	144	3.8%
Total votes		3,751	100

=== 1838–39 ===
1836 United States House of Representatives election in Massachusetts Massachusetts-12
Party	Candidate	Votes	%
Whig	John Quincy Adams	4,100	59.2%
Democratic	William M. Jackson	2,822	40.8%
Total votes		6,922	100

=== 1840 ===
1836 United States House of Representatives election in Massachusetts Massachusetts-12
Party	Candidate	Votes	%
Whig	John Quincy Adams	5,948	54.6%
Democratic	William M. Jackson	4,945	45.4%
Total votes		10,893	100

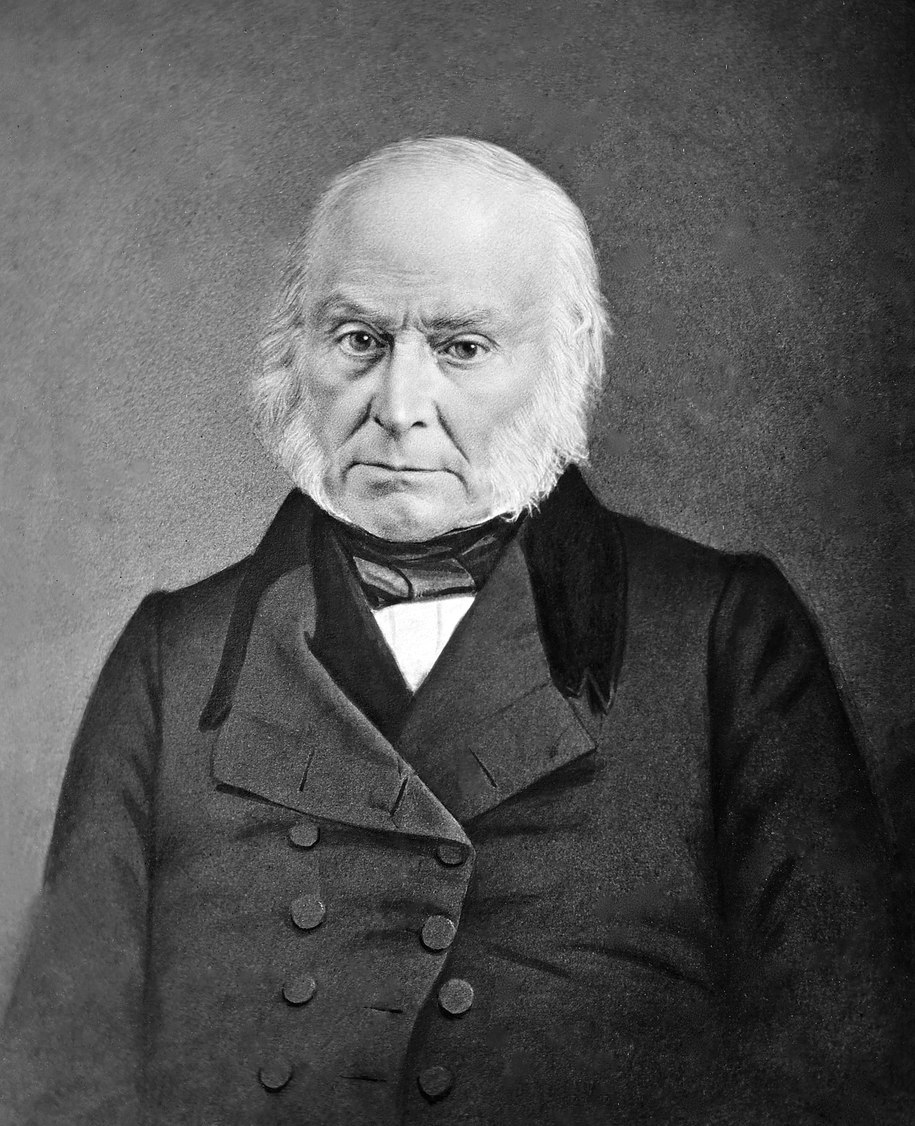
Adams in early 1840s

=== 1842 ===
1836 United States House of Representatives election in Massachusetts Massachusetts-8
Party	Candidate	Votes	%
Whig	John Quincy Adams	5,996	51.9%
Democratic	Ezra Wilkinson	5,418	46.9%
Liberty	William M. Jackson	147	1.3%
Total votes		11,561	100

=== 1844 ===
1844 United States House of Representatives election in Massachusetts Massachusetts-8
Party	Candidate	Votes	%
Whig	John Quincy Adams	8,089	57.1%
Democratic	Issac H. Wright	5,340	37.7%
Liberty	Appleton Howe	733	5.2%
Total votes		14,162	100

=== 1846 ===
1836 United States House of Representatives election in Massachusetts Massachusetts-8
Party	Candidate	Votes	%
Whig	John Quincy Adams	5,765	62.6%
Democratic	Issac H. Wright	2,617	28.3%
Liberty	Appleton Howe	882	9.5%
Total votes		14,162	100

== Speaker of the House of Representatives elections ==
Adams received votes in two Speaker of the House elections: in an 1834 intra-term election during the 23rd Congress and in a December 1835 election at the start of the 24th Congress.

=== June 1834 ===
June 1834 election for speaker
Candidate	Votes per ballot									
Candidate	1st	2nd	3rd	4th	5th	6th	7th	8th	9th	10th
Richard H. Wilde (GA at-large)	64	64	59	49	37	24	16	11	11	11
James K. Polk (TN 9)	42	53	57	59	67	67	73	78	76	78
Joel B. Sutherland (PA 1)	34	30	26	25	16	16	10	9	4	2
John Bell (TN 7)	30	39	47	49	57	65	76	97	104	114
Jesse Speight (NC 4)	18	16	8	4	3	1	3	3	2	1
James M. Wayne (GA at-large)	15	13	15	25	30	36	26	13	8	6
Lewis Williams (NC 13)	4	0	0	0	0	0	0	0	0	0
Edward Everett (MA 4)	3	1	0	0	0	0	0	0	0	0
Thomas Chilton (KY 6)	2	0	0	0	0	0	0	0	0	0
Henry Hubbard (NH at-large)	2	1	1	2	1	0	0	0	0	0
Roger L. Gamble (GA at-large)	1	1	0	0	0	0	0	0	0	0
John Gilmore (PA)	1	1	0	0	0	0	0	0	0	0
John Quincy Adams (MA 12)	0	0	0	0	0	2	0	0	0	0
Benjamin Hardin (KY 7)	0	1	0	0	0	0	0	0	0	0
Amos Lane (IN 4)	0	1	0	0	0	0	0	0	0	0
Thomas A. Marshall (KY 12)	0	0	0	1	0	0	0	0	0	0
William S. Archer (VA 3)	0	0	1	0	0	0	0	0	0	0
Davy Crockett (TN 12)	0	0	1	0	0	0	0	0	0	0
Richard Coulter (PA 19)	0	0	0	0	1	0	0	0	0	0
Blank	4	2	4	7	5	5	10	8	6	6
Total votes	220	223	219	221	217	216	214	219	211	218
Votes necessary	111	112	110	111	109	109	108	110	106	110

=== December 1835 ===
December 1835 election for speaker
Party	Candidate	Votes	%
Jacksonian	James K. Polk (TN 9)	132	58.7
Anti-Jacksonian	John Bell (TN 7) (Incumbent)	84	37.3
Anti-Jacksonian	Charles F. Mercer (VA 14)	3	1.3
Anti-Masonic	John Quincy Adams (MA 12)	2	0.9
Anti-Jacksonian	Francis Granger (NY 26)	1	0.4
—	Blank	3	1.3
Total votes		225	100
Votes necessary		113	>50

== Massachusetts Gubernatorial election ==
=== 1833 ===
1833 Massachusetts gubernatorial election
Party	Candidate	Votes	%
Anti-Jacksonian	John Davis	25,149	40.3%
Anti-Masonic	John Quincy Adams	18,274	29.3%
Jacksonian	Marcus Morton	15,493	24.8%
Unknown	Samuel Allen	3,459	5.5%
Total votes		62,375	100

== Notes and references ==
=== Books ===
- Cooper, William J. (2017). The Lost Founding Father: John Quincy Adams and the Transformation of American Politics. Liveright. ISBN 9781631493898.
- Kaplan, Fred (2014). John Quincy Adams: American Visionary. Harper. ISBN 9780062199324.
- Edel, Charles N. (2014). Nation Builder: John Quincy Adams and the Grand Strategy of the Republic. Harvard University Press. ISBN 9780674368088.
- Guide to U.S. Elections. SAGE Publications. 2010. ISBN 978-1-60426-536-1.
