= 1804 Massachusetts's 12th congressional district special election =

A special election was held in Massachusetts's 12th congressional district on September 17, 1804, to fill a vacancy left by the resignation of Thomson J. Skinner (DR) on August 10, 1804

== Election results ==
Candidate	Party	Votes	Percent
Simon Larned	Democratic-Republican	1,241	61.9%
Daniel Dewey	Federalist	765	38.1%

Larned took his seat on November 5, 1804, at the start of the 2nd session

== See also ==
- List of special elections to the United States House of Representatives
- United States House of Representatives elections, 1804 and 1805
