= 1803 United States Senate election in Massachusetts =

- February 3–5, 1803

40 members of the Massachusetts Senate 396 members of the House of Representatives Majority of each house needed to win
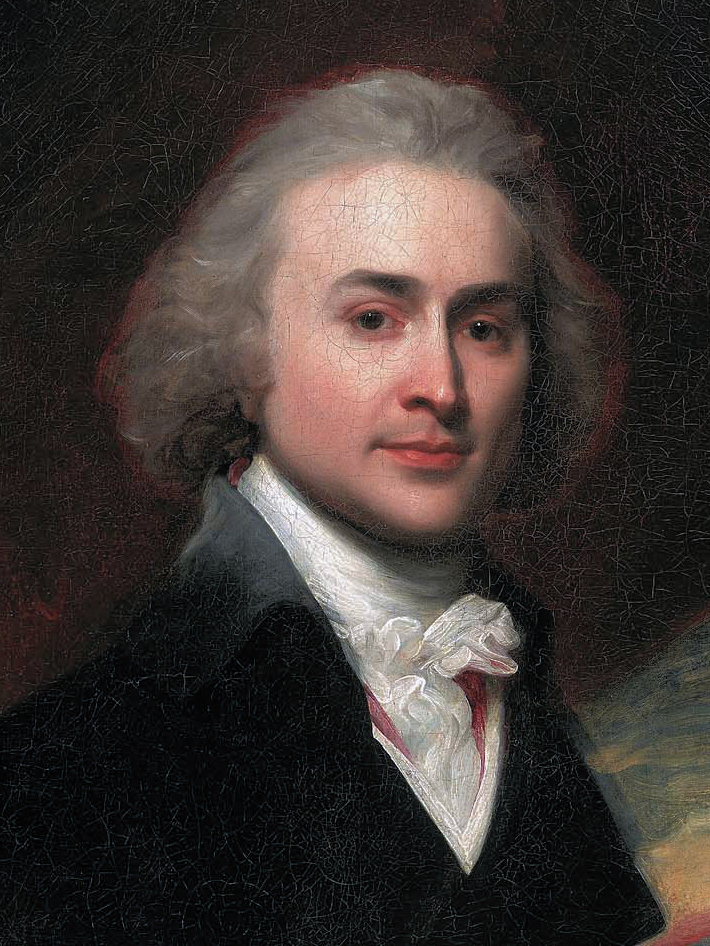

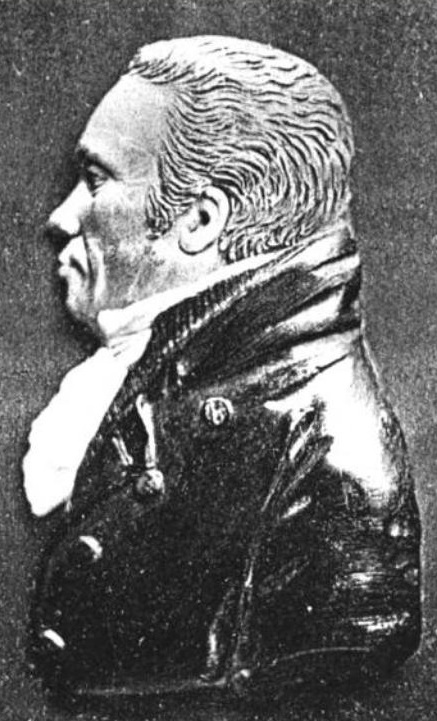
| Nominee | John Quincy Adams | Thomson J. Skinner |
| Party | Federalist | Democratic-Republican |
| Senate | 86 | 70 |
| Percentage | 60.53% | 36.84% |
Senator before election
Jonathan Mason
Federalist
Elected Senator
John Quincy Adams
Federalist

The 1803 United States Senate election in Massachusetts was held from February 3 to 5, 1803. Incumbent senator Jonathan Mason, who had been elected to fill the unexpired term of Benjamin Goodhue in 1800, did not run for a full term in office.

The Massachusetts General Court deliberated and elected state senator and former diplomat John Quincy Adams, son of former President John Adams, on the fourth ballot, following the withdrawal of his rival, former secretary of state Timothy Pickering. Pickering was instead elected to Massachusetts's other U.S. Senate seat.

This is the first United States Senate election in history to feature a candidate who would eventually become president of the United States.

== Background ==
In 1796, Benjamin Goodhue was elected to the United States Senate from Massachusetts. However, he resigned and retired from politics in 1800. In his place, the legislature elected Jonathan Mason. When Mason's term expired in 1803, he declined to stand for re-election.

In 1802, John Quincy Adams, the son of former president John Adams, was elected to the Massachusetts Senate as a member of the Federalist Party and quickly ran for United States House of Representatives in November of the same year. At the time, the Federalists were struggling to adapt to the rapidly expanding popular democracy in the United States, and Adams narrowly lost the election to William Eustis. After his defeat, he privately complained that the Federalists were dominated by "fair weather" supporters who were not willing "to make any sacrifice to party purposes."

Adams's criticisms may have stemmed from mutual enmity with the conservative Hamiltonian faction of the Federalists, whom he blamed for his father's defeat in the 1800 presidential election. The Massachusetts wing of this faction, led by Timothy Pickering, Theodore Lyman, Fisher Ames, and George Cabot, in turn regarded the younger Adams as "eccentric," "unmanageable," and "violent." Pickering, who had been dismissed by the elder Adams as secretary of state in 1800 over Pickering's opposition to peace with revolutionary France, was a leading intraparty rival to the Adams family. However, as of 1803, Adams's view of President Thomas Jefferson remained significantly more negative, and the Federalists remained the best channel for his national political ambitions.

== Candidates ==
- John Quincy Adams, state senator from Braintree, former U.S. ambassador to Prussia and the Netherlands, and son of John Adams
- Henry Knox, former U.S. secretary of war
- Timothy Pickering, former U.S. secretary of state and U.S. secretary of war
- Nicholas Tillinghast
- Thomson J. Skinner, U.S. representative from Williamstown

== Campaign ==
Despite Adams's independence from Federalist leaders and defeat in the 1802 elections, many party members still considered him an "excellent young man" and an "ornament to Massachusetts Federalism" for his diplomatic success in Europe. During the legislative campaigning, Adams revealed his willingness to either give way to, or serve and work with, his rival Pickering.

According to Adams's personal diary, on February 2, a caucus of legislators met at Jonathan Russell's home to discuss a choice for senator but could not decide between Adams and Pickering. On February 3, Benjamin Pickman nominated Adams, and Pickering was immediately nominated after. However, before the election began, Pickman informed Adams that Dwight Foster was certain to resign from Massachusetts's other seat in the Senate, and that both Pickering and Adams might be chosen to fill the two seats. Therefore, the election was in fact a contest for the six-year term expiring in 1809, with the loser likely to be elected to the short term expiring in 1805.

The legislators agreed that Pickering would have the first opportunity to be elected to the full term. He was supported by Harrison Gray Otis and John Lowell. However, after Pickering failed to achieve a majority of the House on a first and second ballot, representatives threw their support to Adams, and he was ratified as the House's choice on the fourth ballot. The Senate subsequently ratified his election on February 5.

=== House results by ballot ===
| Candidate | Ballot | | | |
| Candidate | 1st | 2nd | 3rd | 4th |
|---|---|---|---|---|
| Thomson J. Skinner | 71 | 71 | 71 | 70 |
| John Quincy Adams | 10 | 6 | 56 | 86 |
| Timothy Pickering | 67 | 79 | 33 | 6 |
| Nicholas Tillinghast | 12 | 9 | 10 | 9 |
| Henry Knox | 7 | 5 | 1 | – |
| Samuel Dexter | 1 | – | – | – |
| William Ely | 1 | – | – | – |

=== Senate ballot ===
The Senate ratified the choice of Adams on a single, unanimous ballot.

Senate ballot
| Party | Candidate | Votes | % |
|---|---|---|---|
| Federalist | John Quincy Adams | 19 | 100.00% |
| Total votes | | 19 | 100.00% |

== Aftermath ==
Adams served one term in the Senate, though he would resign months early after the Federalist legislature prematurely voted not to award him a second term. Adams quickly drifted away from the Federalist Party, partly over his differences with Pickering.

After joining the Democratic-Republicans, he would go on to serve as Secretary of State and later as President of the United States from 1825 to 1829.
