= 1805 North Carolina's 5th congressional district special election =

A special election was held in North Carolina's 5th congressional district on August 8, 1805 to fill a vacancy left by the death of Representative James Gillespie (DR) on January 5, 1805, before the 9th Congress began, but after the general elections had taken place for the 8th Congress.

== Election results ==
Candidate	Party	Votes	Percent
Thomas Kenan	Democratic-Republican	2,320	65.3%
Benjamin Smith	Democratic-Republican	1,234	34.7%

The first session of the 9th Congress began on December 2, 1805 so that this vacancy was filled prior to the first meeting of Congress.

== See also ==
- List of special elections to the United States House of Representatives
