= Ezra W. Wilkinson =

American politician (1801 – 1882)

District attorney for the Middle District of Massachusetts
- In office 1844–1851
- Preceded by: Pliny Merrick
- Succeeded by: Benjamin F. Newton

Personal details
- Born: February 14, 1801 Wrentham, Massachusetts, U.S.
- Died: February 6, 1882 (aged 80) Worcester, Massachusetts, U.S.
- Resting place: Democratic
- Education: Brown University
- Occupation: Attorney

Ezra W. Wilkinson (February 14, 1801 – February 6, 1882) was a Massachusetts politician and jurist.

== Early life ==
Wilkinson was born in Wrentham, Massachusetts on February 14, 1801. He attended Day's Academy in Wrentham and graduated from Brown University in 1824. He then taught school for two years and was the head of Monmouth Academy.

== Career ==
=== Legal ===
Wilkinson began his professional studies with Hon. Peter Pratt, of Providence, Rhode Island, where he remained about a year, and he completed them in the office of Josiah J. Fiske, in Wrentham. He was admitted as an attorney of the Court of Common Pleas, at Dedham, Massachusetts at the September term, 1828. He was admitted as a counsellor of the Supreme Judicial Court, at Taunton, Massachusetts at the October term, 1832. He began practice at Freetown, Massachusetts and subsequently removed to Seekonk, Massachusetts.

In 1835, he removed to Dedham, and had an office in the same building formerly occupied by Fisher Ames, and then by Theron Metcalf. He was employed to collate and complete the records of the Norfolk County Courthouse, which had fallen into some confusion through the prolonged illness of Judge Ware, the clerk, who had then recently deceased. In 1843, he was appointed by Governor Marcus Morton as district attorney for the district then composed of Worcester and Norfolk Counties. He held this office until 1855.

In 1859, upon the establishment of the Superior Court, he was appointed one of the associate justices, being then nearly sixty years of age, and he held the office for more twenty-two years until his death in 1882. He had been in active practice for 31 years, so that his professional and judicial career covered a period of 53 years. He never took time off for illness or a vacation.

Within a month before his death, he held a term of court at Salem, Massachusetts.

=== Electoral ===
He was always a Democrat in politics. He was representative to the General Court from Dedham for three sessions in 1841, 1851, and 1856. He was the candidate of his party against John Quincy Adams for Congress in 1842. He was also a member of the Massachusetts Constitutional Convention of 1853.

== Death ==
He died in Dedham, but his remains were interred in Wrentham. At his funeral in St. Paul's Church, Dedham, a large number of members of the bar from Boston and elsewhere were in attendance. Resolutions of respect for his memory were presented in the Superior Court at Salem, and in Boston, shortly after his decease.
