= Charles Larned =

American lawyer and politician

General Charles Larned (ca. 1787 – August 13, 1834, Detroit) was an American lawyer, military officer, and politician. He fought in the War of 1812 and was Attorney General of Michigan Territory.

== Biography ==
=== Early life ===
Charles Larned was a native of Pittsfield in Berkshire County, Massachusetts. He was the son of Berkshire County Sheriff Simon Larned. Larned graduated from Williams College in 1806 and then studied law in Kentucky in the offices of Henry Clay.

=== Military career ===
During the War of 1812, while Larned was dining with a group of prominent citizens in Shelby County, Kentucky, word came to the group from Governor Isaac Shelby that General William Henry Harrison was in danger of being overwhelmed by British General Henry Procter and his Native American allies. One of the group, Colonel Owen, undertook the organization of a regiment, including Larned and commanded by Governor Shelby himself, to reinforce Harrison's troops. Many of the regiment were slaughtered by Native Americans after surrendering to the British, in an event known as the River Raisin Massacre. Larned himself survived and soon rose to the rank of major, and later participated with the regiment in the Battle of the Thames.

While stationed in Detroit, Larned, along with eighty others (including General Lewis Cass) learned of General William Hull's plan to surrender Detroit to the British without a fight. The men signed a document, found among Larned's personal papers, agreeing to seize Hull and depose him in order to prevent the surrender. Hull learned of the plan and instead sent Larned and many of the others south to Ohio to meet a supply convoy. While returning to Detroit, they received word that Hull had surrendered and they were to become prisoners of the British.

=== Practicing law in Detroit ===
After the war, Larned began practicing law in Detroit, and served as Attorney General of Michigan Territory during the Black Hawk War, under Territorial Governor George B. Porter. In 1813 he married Sylvia Easton Colt. He served on the Board of Trustees of the University of Michigan from 1821 until his death.

He survived the cholera epidemic that swept Detroit in 1832. When cholera returned in 1834, Larned worked to alleviate the suffering of others, at one point going without sleep for 48 hours straight. In the end, he succumbed to it and died August 13, 1834. Charles C. Trowbridge, Mayor of Detroit paid tribute to him, saying he left "a family, a city, and a State in mourning." He was buried in Elmwood Cemetery. His wife died August 24, 1845.

== Commemoration ==
- Larned Street in Detroit is named after him.
