= 1804 New York's 1st congressional district special election =

A special election was held in New York's 1st congressional district April 24–26, 1804 to fill a vacancy left by the resignation of John Smith (DR) on February 22, 1804, after being elected to the Senate. The election was held at the same time as the elections for the 9th Congress and were combined into a single election, with the candidate receiving the most votes going to the 9th Congress and the candidate with the second most votes going to the 8th Congress.

== Election results ==
Candidate	Party	Votes	Percent
Eliphalet Wickes	Democratic-Republican	1,052	36.3%
Samuel Riker	Democratic-Republican	1,044	36.0%
Joshua Smith	Federalist	801	27.6%
Others		3	0.1%

Wickes won the seat for the 9th Congress and Riker for the remainder of the 8th Congress, taking his seat on November 5, 1804.

== See also ==
- List of special elections to the United States House of Representatives
