= 1802 United States House of Representatives elections in New York =

United States House of Representatives elections in New York, 1802
- April 27–29, 1802

All 17 New York seats to the United States House of Representatives
	Majority party	Minority party
Party	Democratic-Republican	Federalist
Last election	6	4
Seats won	12	5
Seat change	▲6	▲1
Popular vote	25,943	16,429
Percentage	61.2%	38.8%

The 1802 United States House of Representatives elections in New York were held from April 27 to 29, 1802, to elect 17 U.S. Representatives to represent the State of New York in the United States House of Representatives of the 8th United States Congress.

== Background ==
Ten U.S. Representatives had been elected in April 1800 to a term in the 7th United States Congress beginning on March 4, 1801. Thomas Tillotson and John Bird had resigned their seats, and Theodorus Bailey and John P. Van Ness were elected to fill the vacancies. Van Ness's seat was declared vacant on January 17, 1803. The other nine representatives' term would end on March 3, 1803. The congressional elections were held together with the State elections in late April 1802, about ten months before the term would start on March 4, 1803, and about a year and three months before Congress actually met on October 17, 1803.

== Congressional districts ==
Until the previous elections, there had been ten congressional districts. After the U.S. census of 1800, Congress re-apportioned the seats, and New York's representation was increased to 17. On March 30, 1802, the New York State Legislature re-apportioned the congressional districts.

- The 1st District comprising Queens and Suffolk counties.
- The 2nd District comprising the 1st, 2nd, 3rd and 5th Ward of New York County; and Kings and Richmond counties.
- The 3rd District comprising the 4th, 6th and 7th Ward of New York County.
- The 4th District comprising Westchester and Rockland counties.
- The 5th District comprising Orange County.
- The 6th District comprising Dutchess County.
- The 7th District comprising Ulster and Greene counties.
- The 8th District comprising Columbia County.
- The 9th District comprising Albany County.
- The 10th District comprising Rensselaer County.
- The 11th District comprising Clinton, Saratoga and Essex counties.
- The 12th District comprising Washington County.
- The 13th District comprising Montgomery and Schoharie counties.
- The 14th District comprising Delaware and Otsego counties.
- The 15th District comprising Herkimer and Oneida counties.
- The 16th District comprising Chenango, Tioga and Onondaga counties.
- The 17th District comprising Ontario, Steuben and Cayuga counties.

Note: There are now 62 counties in the State of New York. The counties which are not mentioned in this list had not yet been established, or sufficiently organized, the area being included in one or more of the abovementioned counties.

== Result ==
12 Democratic-Republicans and 5 Federalists were elected. The incumbents Smith, Mitchill, Van Cortlandt, Thomas and Van Rensselaer were re-elected; the incumbent Van Ness was defeated.

1802 United States House election result
District	Democratic-Republican		Federalist		Also ran	
1	John Smith	1,530				
2	John Broome	1,212	Joshua Sands	1,275		
3	Samuel L. Mitchill	719	Joshua Sands	26		
4	Philip Van Cortlandt	1,295			Peter Taulman (D-R)	256
5	Andrew McCord	1,256	John Hathorn	233		
6	Isaac Bloom	1,565	Samuel Mott	1,259		
7	John Cantine		Conrad E. Elmendorf			
8	John P. Van Ness	1,525	Henry W. Livingston	1,622		
9	Abraham G. Lansing	791	Killian K. Van Rensselaer	1,310		
10	Josiah Masters	1,244	George Tibbits	1,305		
11	Beriah Palmer	1,945	Guert Van Schoonhoven	675		
12	David Thomas	2,218	John Williams	1,243		
13	Thomas Sammons	2,560	Robert McFarlan	1,188		
14	Erastus Root	1,779	Benjamin Gilbert	1,320		
15	Francis A. Bloodgood	1,754	Gaylord Griswold	2,022		
16	John Paterson	1,940	Comfort Tyler	1,561		
17	Oliver Phelps	1,552	Nathaniel W. Howell	1,390	William Stuart (D-R)	802

Note: The Anti-Federalists called themselves "Republicans." However, at the same time, the Federalists called them "Democrats" which was meant to be pejorative. After some time both terms got more and more confused, and sometimes used together as "Democratic Republicans" which later historians have adopted (with a hyphen) to describe the party from the beginning, to avoid confusion with both the later established and still existing Democratic and Republican parties.

== Aftermath and special elections ==
John Cantine, elected in the 7th D., resigned his seat before the congressional term began. A special election to fill the vacancy was held at the time of the annual State election in April 1803, and was won by Josiah Hasbrouck, of the same party.

1803 United States House special election result
District	Democratic-Republican		Federalist	
7	Josiah Hasbrouck	1,810	Conrad E. Elmendorf	1,589

Isaac Bloom, elected in the 6th D., died on April 26, 1803, before Congress met. A special election to fill the vacancy was held in September 1803, and was won by Daniel C. Verplanck, of the same party.

1803 United States House special election result
District	Democratic-Republican		Federalist	
6	Daniel C. Verplanck	809	Benjamin Akin	601

The House of Representatives of the 8th United States Congress met for the first time at the United States Capitol in Washington, D.C., on October 17, 1803, and Griswold, Hasbrouck, Livingston, McCord, Mitchill, Palmer, Sammons, Sands, Thomas, Van Cortlandt and Verplanck took their seats on this day. Smith took his seat on October 20; Patterson and Root on October 21; Van Rensselaer on October 29; Phelps on November 7; and Tibbits on November 15.

John Smith, from the 1st D., resigned his seat effective February 22, 1804, after his election to the U.S. Senate. A special election to fill the vacancy was held at the time of the annual State election in April 1804, and was won by Samuel Riker, of the same party. Riker took his seat on November 5, 1804.

1804 United States House regular and special election result
District	Democratic-Republican		Democratic-Republican		Federalist	
1	Eliphalet Wickes	1,052	Samuel Riker	1,044	Joshua Smith	801

(Note: The vacancy in the 8th Congress and the next term in the 9th Congress were filled at the same election. The candidate with the higher number of votes won the full term, the next best was elected to fill the vacancy. Thus Wickes succeeded Riker on March 4, 1805.)

Samuel L. Mitchill, who had been re-elected in the 3rd D. in April 1804 to a third term, beginning on March 4, 1805, resigned his seat on November 22, 1804, after his election to the U.S. Senate. A special election to fill both vacancies (the remainder of his term in the 8th Congress and his seat in the 9th Congress) was held, and were won by George Clinton, Jr., of the same party. Clinton took his seat in the 8th Congress on February 14, 1805, and remained in office after March 4.

== Sources ==
- The New York Civil List compiled in 1858 (see: pg. 65 for district apportionment; pg. 69 for Congressmen)
- Members of the Eighth United States Congress
- Election result 1st D. at Tufts University Library project "A New Nation Votes"
- Election result 2nd D. at Tufts University Library project "A New Nation Votes"
- Election result 3rd D. at Tufts University Library project "A New Nation Votes"
- Election result 4th D. at Tufts University Library project "A New Nation Votes"
- Election result 5h D. at Tufts University Library project "A New Nation Votes"
- Election result 6th D. at Tufts University Library project "A New Nation Votes"
- Election result 7th D. at Tufts University Library project "A New Nation Votes" [Here the numbers indicate victory of Elmendorf, which is inconsistent with Elmendorf running again at the special election, confirming the fact that it was Cantine who resigned.]
- Election result 8th D. at Tufts University Library project "A New Nation Votes"
- Election result 9th D. at Tufts University Library project "A New Nation Votes"
- Election result 10th D. at Tufts University Library project "A New Nation Votes"
- Election result 11th D. at Tufts University Library project "A New Nation Votes"
- Election result 12th D. at Tufts University Library project "A New Nation Votes"
- Election result 13th D. at Tufts University Library project "A New Nation Votes"
- Election result 14th D. at Tufts University Library project "A New Nation Votes"
- Election result 15th D. at Tufts University Library project "A New Nation Votes"
- Election result 16th D. at Tufts University Library project "A New Nation Votes"
- Election result 17th D. at Tufts University Library project "A New Nation Votes"
- Special election result 7th D. at Tufts University Library project "A New Nation Votes"
- Special election result 6th D. at Tufts University Library project "A New Nation Votes"
- Special election result 1st D. at Tufts University Library project "A New Nation Votes"
