= 1804 New York's 2nd and 3rd congressional district special elections =

A special election was held in New York's 2nd and 3rd congressional districts September 11–13, 1804 to fill a vacancy in the 9th Congress left by Representative-elect Daniel D. Tompkins (DR) resigning to accept an appointment to the New York Supreme Court.

At the time, the 2nd and 3rd districts had combined returns, functioning as a single plural district, hence, both Tompkins' initial election and this special election covered both districts.

== Election returns ==
Candidate	Party	Votes	Percent
Gurdon S. Mumford	Democratic-Republican	1,119	84.2%
George I. Warner	Unknown	210	15.8%

Mumford took his seat with the rest of the 9th Congress at the start of the 1st session.

== See also ==
- List of special elections to the United States House of Representatives
