= 1799 New York's 1st congressional district special election =

A special election was held in New York's 1st congressional district December 27–29, 1799 to fill a vacancy left by the death of Jonathan N. Havens (DR) on October 25, 1799.

== Election results ==
Candidate	Party	Votes	Percent
John Smith	Democratic-Republican	1,599	56.2%
Silas Wood	Federalist	1,098	38.6%
Gazen Ryers	Federalist	148	5.2%

== See also ==
- United States House of Representatives elections, 1798 and 1799
