= 1802 United States House of Representatives election in Delaware =

- October 9–20, 1802
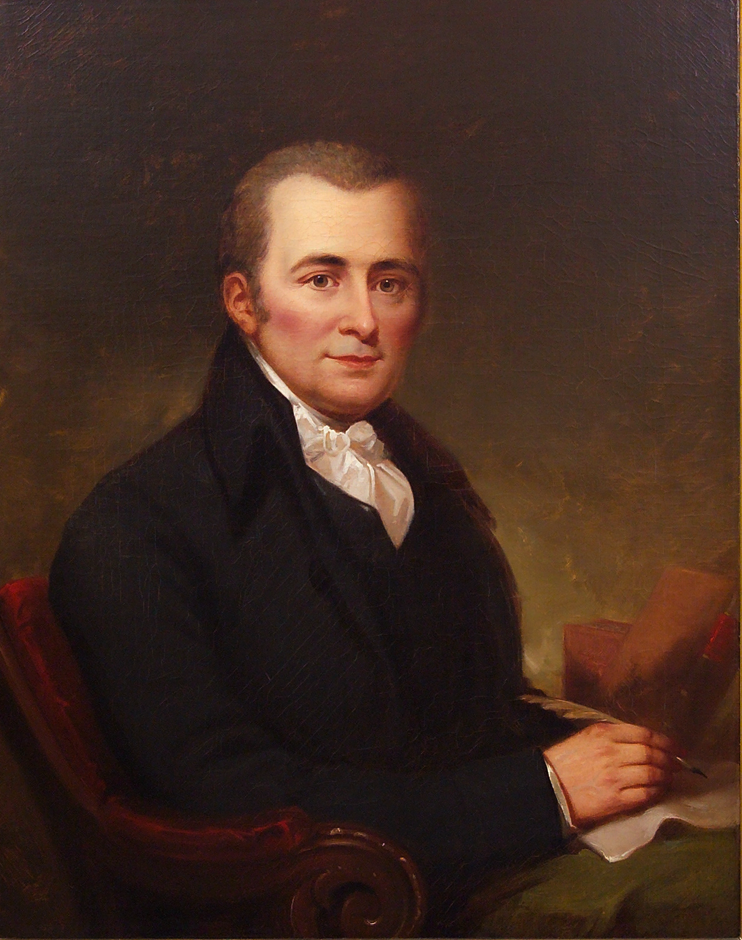

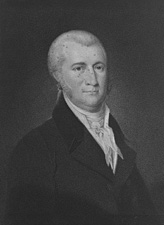
Nominee	Caesar Augustus Rodney	James A. Bayard Sr.
Party	Democratic-Republican	Federalist
Popular vote	3,421	3,406
Percentage	50.11%	49.89%
U.S. Representative before election
James A. Bayard Sr.
Federalist
Elected U.S. Representative
Caesar Augustus Rodney
Democratic-Republican

The 1802 United States House of Representatives election in Delaware was held from October 9–20, 1802. The incumbent Representative James A. Bayard Sr. was defeated by the former state representative Caesar Augustus Rodney with 50.11% of the vote and 15 votes.

== Results ==
1802 United States House of Representatives election in Delaware
Party	Candidate	Votes	%
Democratic-Republican	Caesar Augustus Rodney	3,421	50.11%
Federalist	James A. Bayard Sr. (incumbent)	3,406	49.89%
Total votes		6,827	100%

=== Results by county ===
County	Rodney#	Rodney%	Bayard#	Bayard%	Total votes cast
Kent	943	44.80%	1,162	55.20%	2,105
New Castle	1,664	70.18%	707	29.82%	2,371
Sussex	814	34.62%	1,537	65.38%	2,351
Totals	3,421	50.11%	3,406	49.89%	6,827
