= James H. Woods =

American politician

James H. Woods was an American politician from New York.

He was an Anti-Masonic member of the New York State Assembly (Ontario Co.) in 1833.

== Sources ==
- The New York Civil List compiled by Franklin Benjamin Hough (pages 214 and 317; Weed, Parsons and Co., 1858)
