= Simon Larned =

American politician

Member of the U.S. House of Representatives from Massachusetts's 12th district
- In office November 5, 1804 – March 3, 1805
- Preceded by: Thomson J. Skinner
- Succeeded by: Barnabas Bidwell

Sheriff of Berkshire County, Massachusetts

Member of the Massachusetts House of Representatives
- In office 1791–1791

Treasurer of Berkshire County, Massachusetts
- In office 1792–1812

Personal details
- Born: August 3, 1753 Thompson, Connecticut Colony, British America
- Died: November 16, 1817 (aged 64) Pittsfield, Massachusetts, U.S
- Resting place: Pittsfield Cemetery
- Party: Democratic-Republican
- Spouse(s): Ruth Bull, m. 1784
- Children: Charles Larned, (1792–1834); Sylvester Larned, born Pittsfield, Massachusetts, August 23, 1796.

Military service
- Allegiance: United States of America
- Branch/service: Continental Army; United States Army
- Rank: Captain; Colonel
- Unit: Colonel Shepherd's regiment Ninth United States Infantry
- Commands: Adjutant and Captain in Colonel William Shepard's regiment from January 1, 1777, to December 31, 1780, being aide-de-camp to General Glover, from October 1, 1779.
- Battles/wars: American Revolutionary War; Siege of Boston; War of 1812; Battle of Plattsburgh

Simon Larned (August 3, 1753 – November 16, 1817) was a U.S. representative from Massachusetts.

Born in Thompson in the Connecticut Colony, Larned attended the common schools. Larned served as Sheriff of Berkshire County. He served in the Revolutionary War as Adjutant and Captain in Colonel William Shepard's regiment from January 1, 1777, to December 31, 1780, being aide-de-camp to General Glover, from October 1, 1779. He engaged in mercantile pursuits in Pittsfield, Massachusetts, in 1784. He was a member of the Massachusetts House of Representatives in 1791. County treasurer 1792–1812. He served as colonel of the Ninth United States Infantry in the War of 1812 and was engaged in action at Plattsburg, along the Mohawk River.

Larned was admitted as an original member of the Society of the Cincinnati in the state of Massachusetts when it was established in 1783.

Larned was elected as a Democratic-Republican to the Eighth Congress to fill the vacancy caused by the resignation of Thomson J. Skinner and served from November 5, 1804, to March 3, 1805. He served as president of the Berkshire Bank. He died in Pittsfield, Massachusetts, on November 16, 1817. He was interred in the Pittsfield Cemetery.

== Bibliography ==
- Dolliver, Louise Pearsons (1907), Lineage book, Volume XXIII, Washington, DC: Daughters of the American Revolution, p. 43.
- Wiley, Edgar J. (1917), Catalogue of Officers and Students of Middlebury College in Middlebury, Vermont and Others Who Have Received Degrees 1800-1915, Middlebury, VT: Middlebury College, p. 27.
- United States Congress. "Simon Larned (id: L000097)". Biographical Directory of the United States Congress.

U.S. House of Representatives
| Preceded by Thomson J. Skinner | Member of the U.S. House of Representatives from Massachusetts's 12th congressional district November 5, 1804 – March 3, 1805 | Succeeded by Barnabas Bidwell |
