= Thomson J. Skinner =

American politician

Thomson Joseph Skinner
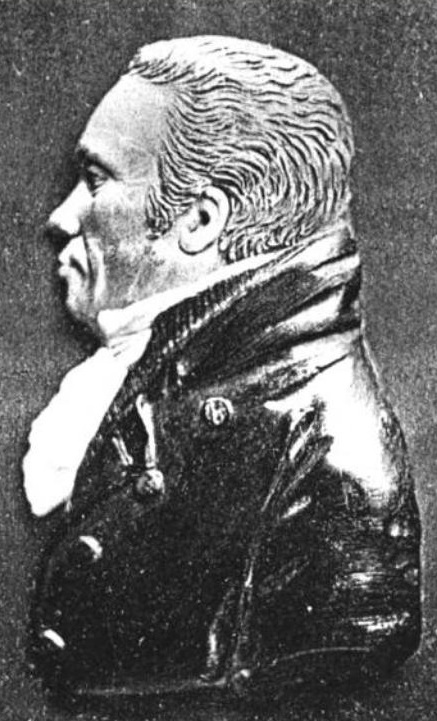

Member of the U.S. House of Representatives from Massachusetts
- In office January 27, 1797 – March 3, 1799
- Preceded by: Theodore Sedgwick
- Succeeded by: Theodore Sedgwick
- Constituency: 1st district
- In office March 4, 1803 – August 10, 1804
- Preceded by: Samuel Thatcher
- Succeeded by: Simon Larned
- Constituency: 12th district

7th Treasurer and Receiver-General of Massachusetts
- In office 1806–1808
- Governor: Caleb Strong; James Sullivan
- Preceded by: Jonathan Jackson
- Succeeded by: Josiah Dwight

Member of the Massachusetts House of Representatives
- In office 1790–1797; 1801–1803

Member of the Massachusetts Senate
- In office 1789; 1800

Personal details
- Born: May 24, 1752 Colchester, Connecticut Colony, British America
- Died: January 20, 1809 (aged 56) Boston, Massachusetts, U.S.
- Party: Federalist; Democratic-Republican
- Spouse: Ann Foote (1754–1808)
- Profession: Businessman; Politician

Thomson Joseph Skinner (May 24, 1752 – January 20, 1809), was an American politician from Williamstown, Massachusetts. In addition to service as a militia officer during the American Revolution, he served as a county judge and sheriff, member of both houses of the Massachusetts legislature, U.S. Marshal, and member of the United States House of Representatives. He served for two years as Treasurer and Receiver-General of Massachusetts, and after his death an audit showed his accounts to be deficient for more than the value of his estate, which led to those who had posted bonds on his behalf having to pay the debt.

== Early life ==
Thomson J. Skinner was born in Colchester in the Connecticut Colony on May 24, 1752, the son of Reverend Thomas Skinner and Mary Thomson, the second wife of Thomas Skinner. (His name is sometimes spelled Thompson, Tompson, Tomson, or even Thomas.) Skinner was educated in Colchester, his father died when he was 10 years old, and Thomson Skinner and his brother Benjamin were apprenticed to a carpenter and homebuilder. At age 21 Skinner moved to Williamstown, Massachusetts with his brother, where they went into the construction business as partners in a firm they named "T. J. and B. Skinner". The Skinner brothers were also involved in other ventures, including a successful tavern.

== Military career ==
Thomson Skinner was a member of the militia, including service during and after the American Revolution. In the summer of 1776 he carried messages between units in Berkshire County and General Horatio Gates, commander of the Continental Army's Northern Department in upstate New York. He also served as adjutant of Berkshire County's 2nd Regiment, adjutant of the Berkshire County 3rd Regiment (Simonds'), and a company commander in the Berkshire County regiment commanded by Asa Barnes. Skinner remained in the militia after the war, and rose to the rank of major general. During the Revolution he served as a member of the court-martial which acquitted Paul Revere's conduct during the unsuccessful Penobscot Expedition.

== Political career ==
He served in the Massachusetts House of Representatives in 1781, 1785, 1789, and 1800. He was a member of the Massachusetts State Senate from 1786 to 1788, 1790 to 1797, and 1801 to 1803.

From 1788 to 1807, Skinner was a Judge of the Court of Common Pleas for Berkshire County, and he was chief judge from 1795 to 1807. In 1788 he was a delegate to the state convention that ratified the United States Constitution, and voted in favor of ratification. He was also a candidate for Massachusetts's 4th congressional district that year.

From 1791 to 1792 he served as Berkshire County Sheriff. In 1792 Skinner, recognized as a Federalist, was a presidential elector, and supported the reelection of George Washington and John Adams. Skinner was a founding trustee of Williams College, served on the board of trustees from 1793 to 1809, and was treasurer from 1793 to 1798.

Skinner represented Massachusetts's 1st congressional district (Berkshire County) in the U.S. House for part of one term and all of another, January 1797 to March 1799. Before this election, he also ran for the House in 1792 and 1794. He was again elected to the U.S. House in 1802, this time from the renumbered 12th District, and served from March 1803 until resigning in August 1804. Skinner, by now identified with the Jeffersonian or Democratic-Republican Party, lost to John Quincy Adams, the Federalist candidate, in an 1803 election for U.S. Senator.

From 1804 to 1807 Skinner served as U.S. Marshal for Massachusetts. From 1806 to 1808 he was Treasurer and Receiver-General of Massachusetts.

== Death ==
Skinner died in Boston on January 20, 1809.

== Accounts as Massachusetts Treasurer ==
After Skinner's death, an 1809 audit revealed that his accounts as state treasurer were in arrears for $60,000 (about $935,000 in 2017), while his estate was valued at only $20,000. Several of the individuals who had posted surety bonds to guarantee his performance as treasurer paid portions of the remaining $40,000 obligation in order to satisfy Skinner's debt.

== Family ==
In 1773 Skinner married Ann Foote (April 11, 1754 – December 15, 1808). Their children included Thomson Joseph, Mary, Thomas, Ann, Eliza, and George Denison. Skinner and his wife had known each other as children because Skinner's mother had married Ann Foote's father following the deaths of Skinner's father and Foote's mother.

U.S. House of Representatives
Preceded by Theodore Sedgwick	Member of the U.S. House of Representatives from Massachusetts's 1st congressional district January 27, 1797 – March 3, 1799	Succeeded by Theodore Sedgwick
Preceded by Samuel Thatcher	Member of the U.S. House of Representatives from Massachusetts's 12th congressional district March 4, 1803 – August 10, 1804	Succeeded by Simon Larned
Political offices
Preceded by Jonathan Jackson	7th Treasurer and Receiver General, Commonwealth of Massachusetts; 1806–1808	Succeeded by Josiah Dwight
