= 1864 Rhode Island gubernatorial election =

- April 3, 1864
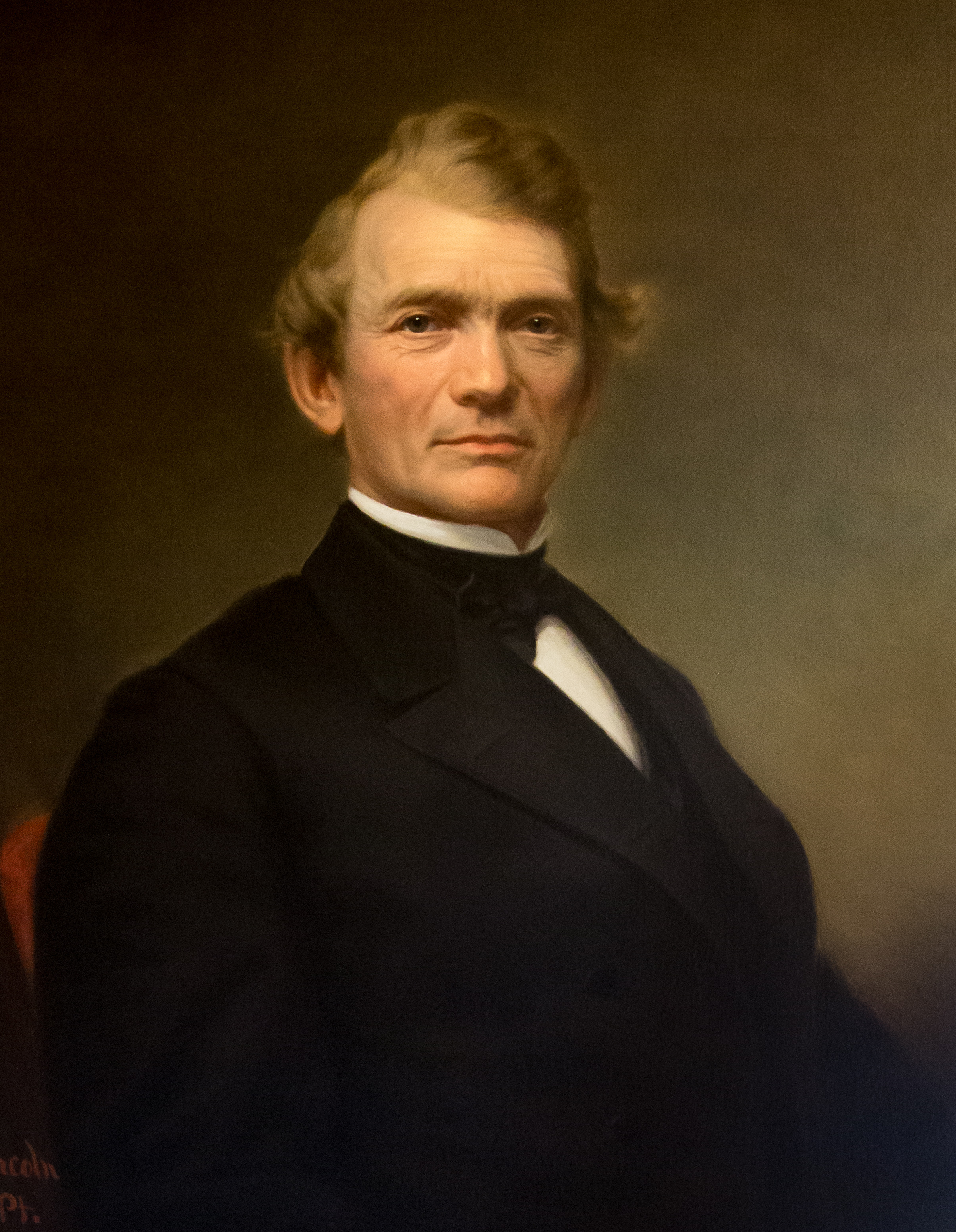

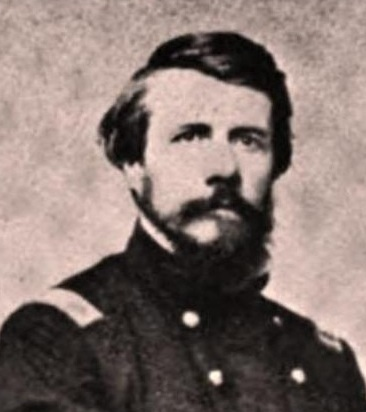

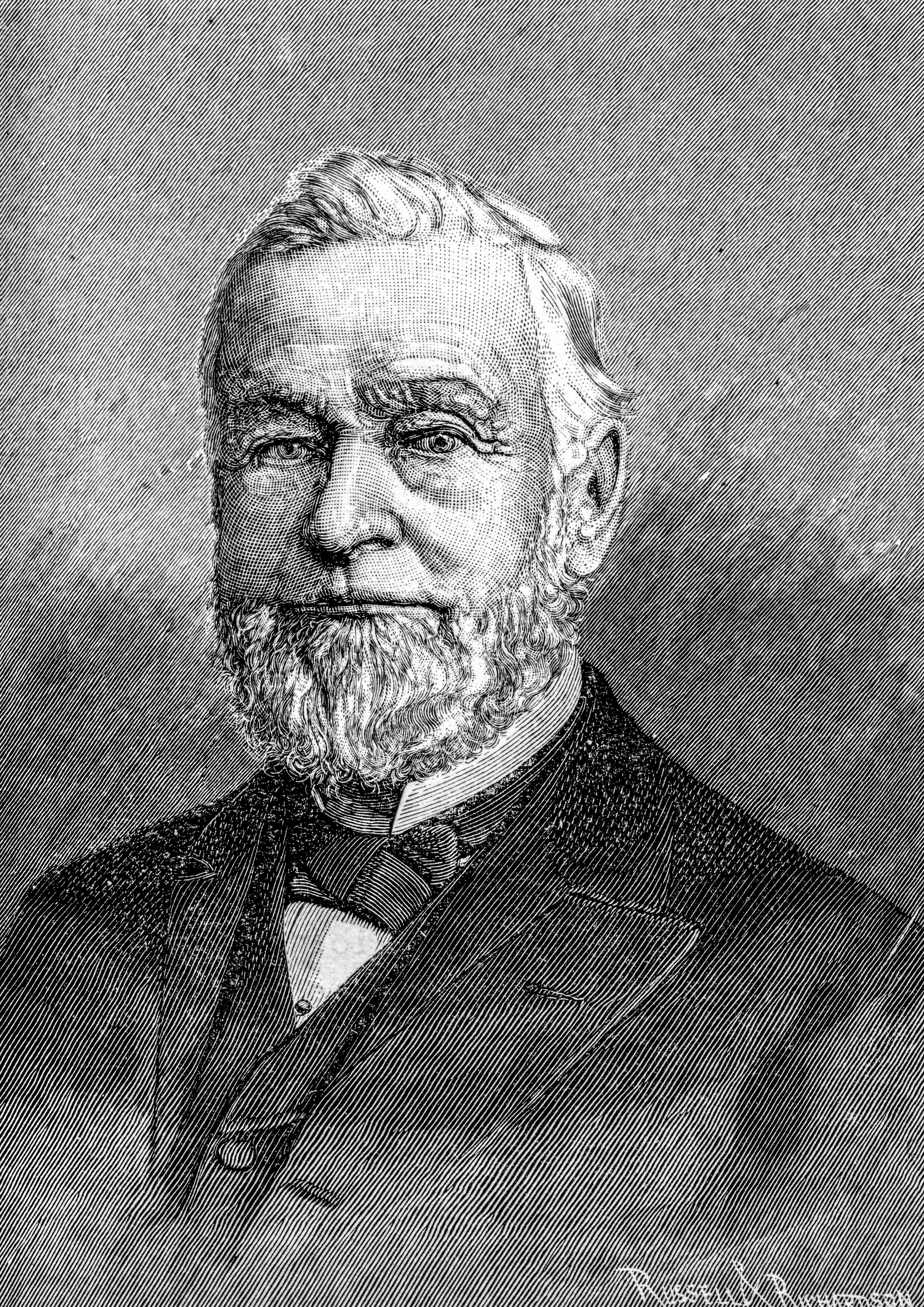
Nominee	James Y. Smith	George H. Browne	Amos C. Barstow
Party	National Union	Democratic	Independent Union
Popular vote	8,836	7,312	1,348
Percentage	50.50%	41.79%	7.71%
- County results Smith: 40–50% 50–60% 60–70% Browne: 40–50%
Governor before election
James Y. Smith
Republican
Elected Governor
James Y. Smith
National Union

A gubernatorial election was held in Rhode Island on April 3, 1864. The National Union incumbent governor James Y. Smith defeated the Democratic former U.S. representative from Rhode Island's 2nd congressional district George H. Browne and the Independent Union former mayor of Providence Amos C. Barstow.

Smith, a Radical Republican, was elected in 1863 with the support of the former governor William Sprague IV, who persuaded his coalition of conservatives and War Democrats to back the Republican candidate against his Democratic and Constitutional Union challenger, William C. Cozzens. Smith's re-election became embroiled in the campaign for the National Union presidential nomination when supporters of Sprague's father-in-law, the U.S. treasury secretary Salmon P. Chase, secured his endorsement by the National Union state convention. Supporters of the incumbent president Abraham Lincoln deserted Smith in favor of Barstow, who ran as an Independent Unionist. Many of Sprague's former conservative allies broke with him to support Browne, a War Democrat and a colonel in the Union Army.

== General election ==
1864 Rhode Island gubernatorial election
Party	Candidate	Votes	%
National Union	James Y. Smith (incumbent)	8,836	50.50
Democratic	George H. Browne	7,312	41.79
Independent Union	Amos C. Barstow	1,348	7.71
Total votes		17,496	100.00
National Union gain from Republican			

== Bibliography ==
- Dell, Christopher (1975). Lincoln and the War Democrats: The Grand Erosion of Conservative Tradition. Rutherford, NJ: Farleigh Dickenson University Press.
- DeSimone, Russel J.; Schofield, Daniel C. (October 2015), Rhode Island Election Tickets: A Survey (PDF), Kingston, RI: University of Rhode Island
- Dubin, Michael J. (2014). United States Gubernatorial Elections, 1861–1911: The Official Results by State and County. Jefferson, NC: McFarland and Company. ISBN 978-0-7864-5646-8.
- Smith, Adam I. P. (2006). No Party Now: Politics in the Civil War North. New York: Oxford University Press. ISBN 978-0-19-534596-4.
