= 1865 Rhode Island gubernatorial election =

- April 5, 1865
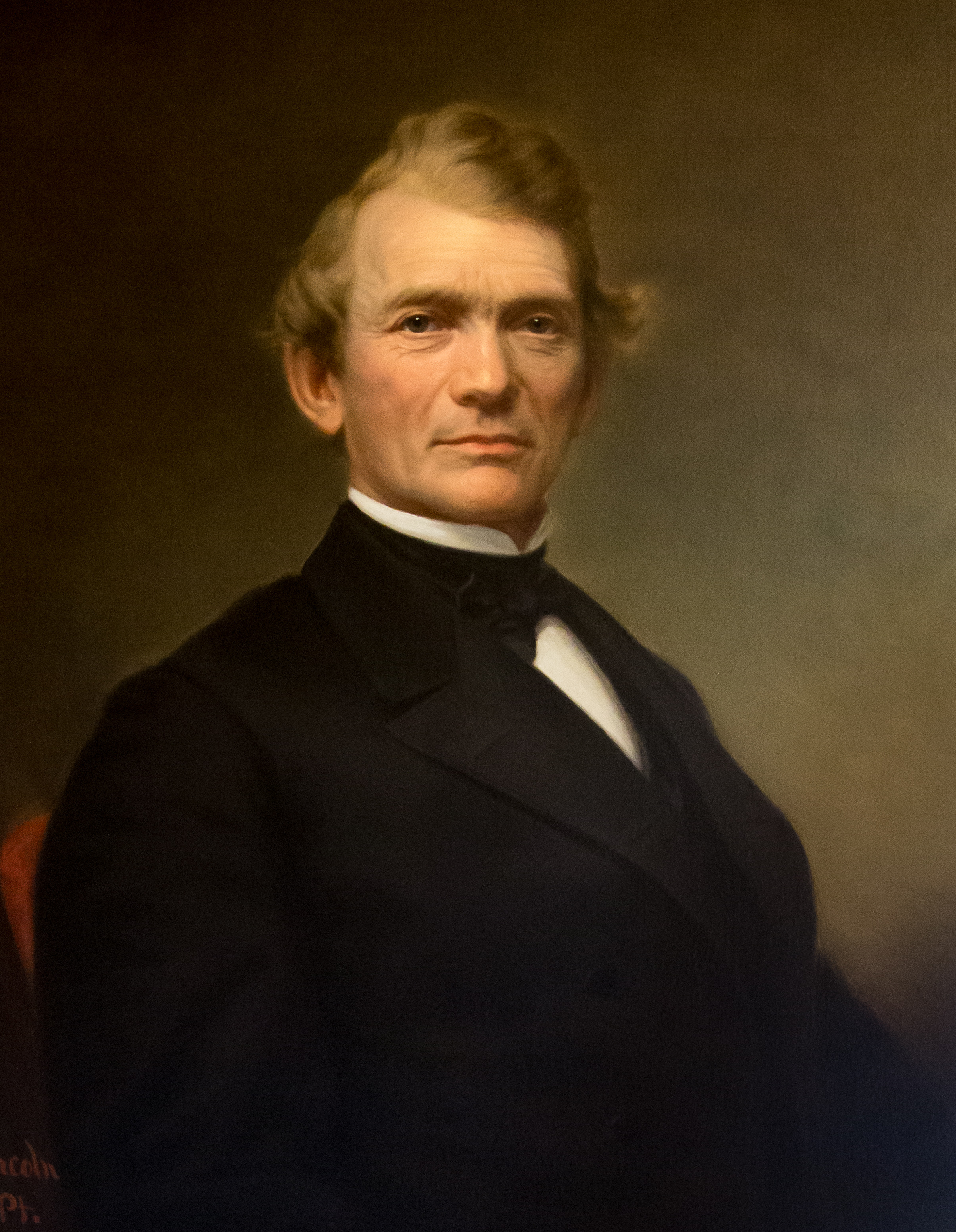

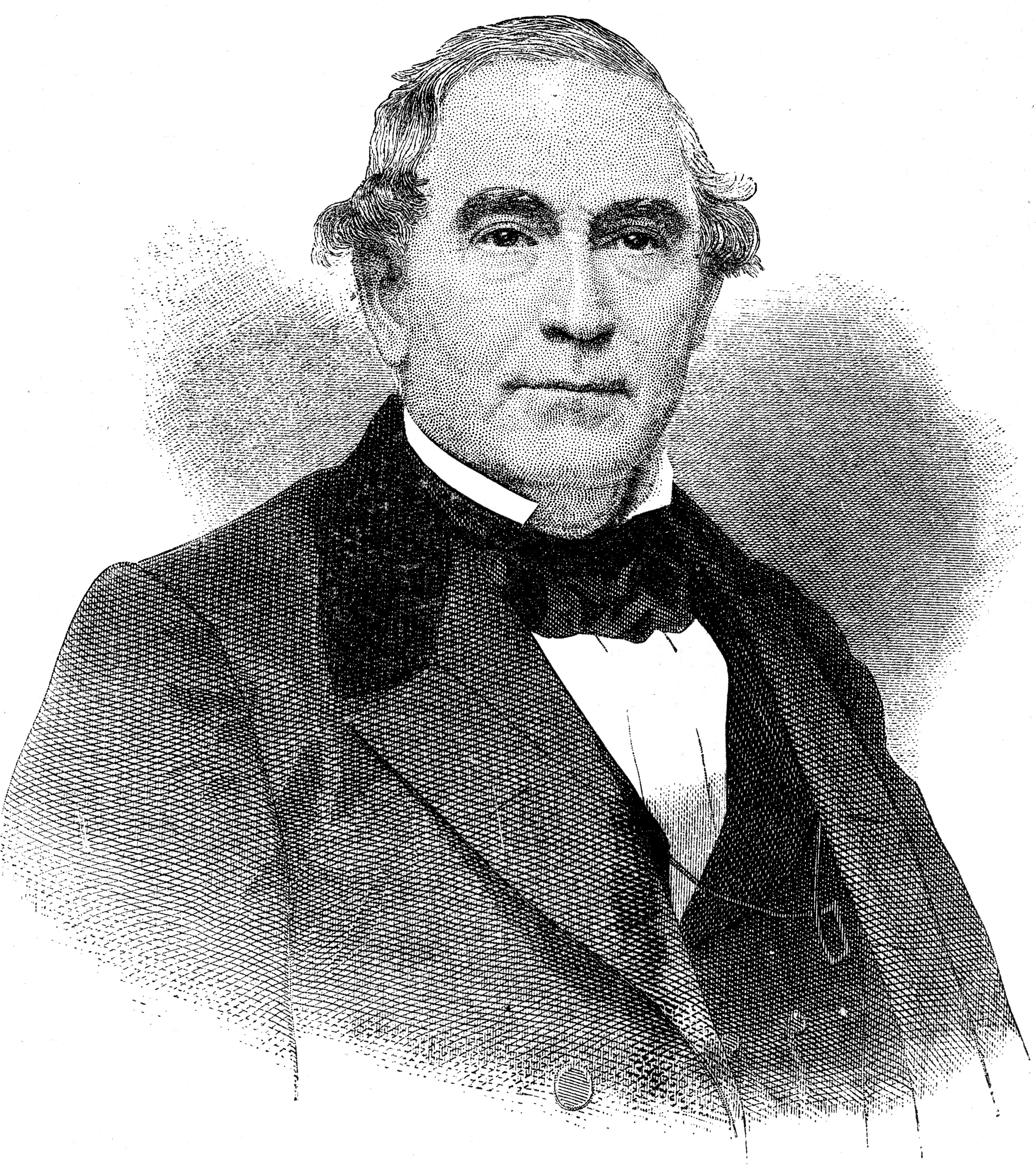
Nominee	James Y. Smith	Edward Harris
Party	National Union	Equal Rights
Popular vote	10,153	197
Percentage	92.43%	1.79%
- County results Smith: >90%
Governor before election
James Y. Smith
National Union
Elected Governor
James Y. Smith
National Union

A gubernatorial election was held in Rhode Island on April 5, 1865. The National Union incumbent governor James Y. Smith was re-elected against token opposition.

Smith, a Radical Republican, won the 1863 Rhode Island gubernatorial election and was re-elected in 1864. His nearest opponent was the former state senator Edward Harris, an abolitionist and temperance supporter who ran on the Equal Rights ticket.

== General election ==
1865 Rhode Island gubernatorial election
Party	Candidate	Votes	%
National Union	James Y. Smith (incumbent)	10,153	92.43
Equal Rights	Edward Harris	197	1.79
Democratic	George H. Browne	100	0.91
Write-in		535	4.87
Total votes		10,985	100.00
National Union hold			

== Bibliography ==
- Dell, Christopher (1975). Lincoln and the War Democrats: The Grand Erosion of Conservative Tradition. Rutherford, NJ: Farleigh Dickenson University Press.
- DeSimone, Russel J.; Schofield, Daniel C. (October 2015), Rhode Island Election Tickets: A Survey (PDF), Kingston, RI: University of Rhode Island
- Dubin, Michael J. (2014). United States Gubernatorial Elections, 1861–1911: The Official Results by State and County. Jefferson, NC: McFarland and Company. ISBN 978-0-7864-5646-8.
- Sobel, Robert; Raimo, John, eds. (1978). Biographical Directory of the Governors of the United States, 1789–1978. Westport, CT: Meckler Books. ISBN 0-930466-00-4.
