= Brayton =

Brayton may refer to:

== People ==
- Brayton (name)
- Sir Wilfrid Lawson, 1st Baronet, of Brayton
- Sir Wilfrid Lawson, 2nd Baronet, of Brayton
- Sir Wilfrid Lawson, 3rd Baronet, of Brayton
- Sir Hilton Lawson, 4th Baronet

== Church ==
- Brayton Church Ahlone, Yangon, Myanmar

== Places ==
- Brayton, Iowa, a city in the United States
- Brayton, Nebraska
- Brayton, New South Wales, a small village in Australia
- Brayton Hall, Cumbria, England
  - Brayton railway station, Cumbria, England, a former station named after Brayton Hall
- Brayton, North Yorkshire, a small village in England
  - Brayton Academy, formerly Brayton High School, a high school in Selby, North Yorkshire, England
- Brayton Grist Mill, an historic grist mill in Pomfret, Connecticut
- Brayton Fire Training Field, a firefighter training field in College Station, Texas
- Brayton Methodist Episcopal Church, an historic church in Fall River, Massachusetts
- 32571 Brayton, a Main-belt Asteroid and named after Scott Brayton
- Bailey-Brayton Field, a college baseball stadium in Pullman, Washington, United States

== Other ==
- Brayton cycle, a thermodynamic cycle
- Justice Brayton (disambiguation)
