= Brayton (name) =

Brayton is both a surname and a given name. Notable people with the name include:

Surname:

- Ada Margaret Brayton (fl. 1920s–1930s), American astronomer
- Charles R. Brayton (1840–1910), American Republican politician
- Charles Brayton (judge) (1772–1834), justice of the Rhode Island Supreme Court
- Chuck Brayton (1925–2015), American baseball head coach for the Washington State Cougars
- George Brayton (1830–1892), American mechanical engineer
- George Brayton (New York politician) (1772–1837), New York politician
- George A. Brayton (1803–1880), associate justice of the Rhode Island Supreme Court
- Lee Brayton (1933–2022), American racing driver
- Lily Brayton (1876–1953), English actress
- Robert K. Brayton (1933–2025), American electrical engineer
- Scott Brayton (1959–1996), American race car driver
- Tyler Brayton (born 1979), American football for the Carolina Panthers
- William Brayton (Vermont judge) (1787–1828), justice of the Vermont Supreme Court
- William Daniel Brayton (1815–1887), U.S. Representative from Rhode Island

Given name:

- Brayton Biekman (born 1978), Dutch footballer
- Brayton Bowman (fl. 2010s–2020s) American singer-songwriter
- Brayton Ives (1840–1914), president of Northern Pacific Railway, of the New York Stock Exchange and of the Western National Bank of New York
- Brayton Laster (born 2002), American professional stock car racing driver
- Brayton H. Ransom (1879–1925), American zoologist and veterinary parasitologist
- Brayton Vázquez (born 1998), Mexican professional footballer
