= Justice Durfee =

Justice Durfee may refer to:

- Job Durfee (1790–1847), associate justice and chief justice of the Rhode Island Supreme Court
- Thomas Durfee (1826–1901), associate justice of the Rhode Island Supreme Court
