= George Brayton (disambiguation) =

George Brayton may refer to:

- George Brayton (1830–1892), American inventor and engineer
- George Brayton (New York politician), (1772–1837), American politician
- George A. Brayton (1802–1880), American judge
