= Justice Brayton =

Justice Brayton may refer to:

- Charles Brayton (judge) (1772–1834), associate justice of the Rhode Island Supreme Court
- George A. Brayton (1803–1880), associate justice of the Rhode Island Supreme Court
- William Brayton (Vermont judge) (1787–1828), associate justice of the Vermont Supreme Court
