= Wingate Hayes =

American politician

Wingate Hayes (1823–1877) was Speaker of the Rhode Island House of Representatives and U.S. District Attorney for the district of Rhode Island during the American Civil War.

In 1823 Wingate Hayes was born in Farmington, New Hampshire to John and Sarah Hayes. Hayes graduated from Brown University in 1844 and then studied in the office of Richard Ward Greene in Rhode Island. He was admitted to the bar in 1847. Hayes served on the Providence City Council and in the Rhode Island House of Representatives, where he was elected Speaker, serving from 1859 to 1860. Hayes also served as assistant adjutant general and division inspector, with rank of colonel. President Abraham Lincoln appointed Hayes to be the U.S. District Attorney for Rhode Island serving from 1861 to 1871. President Andrew Johnson tried unsuccessfully to replace Hayes, and Hayes eventually resigned to private practice. He mentored and later partnered with future Rhode Island Supreme Court Chief Justice Charles Matteson. Hayes was also involved in various railroads and other enterprises. He died in 1877.

== References and external links ==
- Abraham Payne Reminiscences of the Rhode Island Bar (Tibbitts & Preston: Providence, 1885), 227-232 (accessed on Google Book Search)
- Rhode Island Speakers of the House of Representatives

Legal offices
| Preceded by George H. Browne | United States Attorney for the District of Rhode Island; 1861 – 1871 | Succeeded by Nathan F. Dixon II |
