= William Rodman =

William Rodman may refer to:

- William Rodman (Pennsylvania politician), U.S. Representative from Pennsylvania
- William B. Rodman, American lawyer and politician from North Carolina
- William B. Rodman Jr., his son, North Carolina lawyer and politician
- William M. Rodman, mayor of Providence, Rhode Island
