= Thomas M. Burgess =

Rhode Island politician

Thomas Mackie Burgess
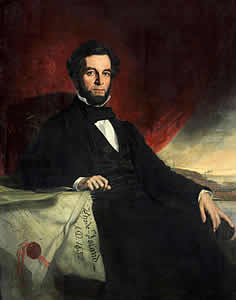
- Thomas M. Burgess

2nd Mayor of Providence, Rhode Island
- In office February 1841 – June 1852
- Preceded by: Samuel W. Bridgham
- Succeeded by: Amos C. Barstow

Personal details
- Born: June 6, 1806 Providence, Rhode Island, U.S.
- Died: October 17, 1856 (aged 50) Providence, Rhode Island, U.S.
- Resting place: North Burial Ground, Providence
- Party: Whig
- Spouse: Eliza Howard
- Education: Brown University
- Known for: Mayor of Providence, Rhode Island

Thomas Mackie Burgess (June 6, 1806 – October 17, 1856) was an American politician. He served as second mayor of Providence, Rhode Island from 1841 to 1852.

== Early life ==
Burgess was born in Providence and graduated Brown University, class of 1822. After graduation, he began to study law, but abandoned this pursuit to become a successful merchant.

== Political career ==
When Providence became a city in 1832, Burgess was elected one of the original members of the Providence Common Council. On the death of the first mayor, Samuel W. Bridgham, in February 1841, Burgess was elected his successor and re-elected annually until 1852.

He was mayor during the Dorr Rebellion (1841–42), a violent free-suffrage movement that promoted voting rights for all men regardless of property ownership. This was a turbulent time when Rhode Island had two separate governors vying to run the state concurrently.

== Railroad career ==
Burgess was president of the Providence, Warren and Bristol Railroad Company. And/or he served as the President of the Boston and Providence Railroad Company.

== Personal life ==
Burgess enjoyed spending winters in Charleston, South Carolina, where he made many lifelong friends.

He married Eliza Howard of Providence in 1831.

Was paralyzed by stroke about two and a half years before his death, then died of a second stroke. He died at his residence, 108 South Main Street, Providence, October 17, 1856.

Political offices
Preceded by Samuel W. Bridgham	Mayor of Providence; 1841–1852	Succeeded by Amos C. Barstow
