= Walter R. Danforth =

American journalist (1787–1861)

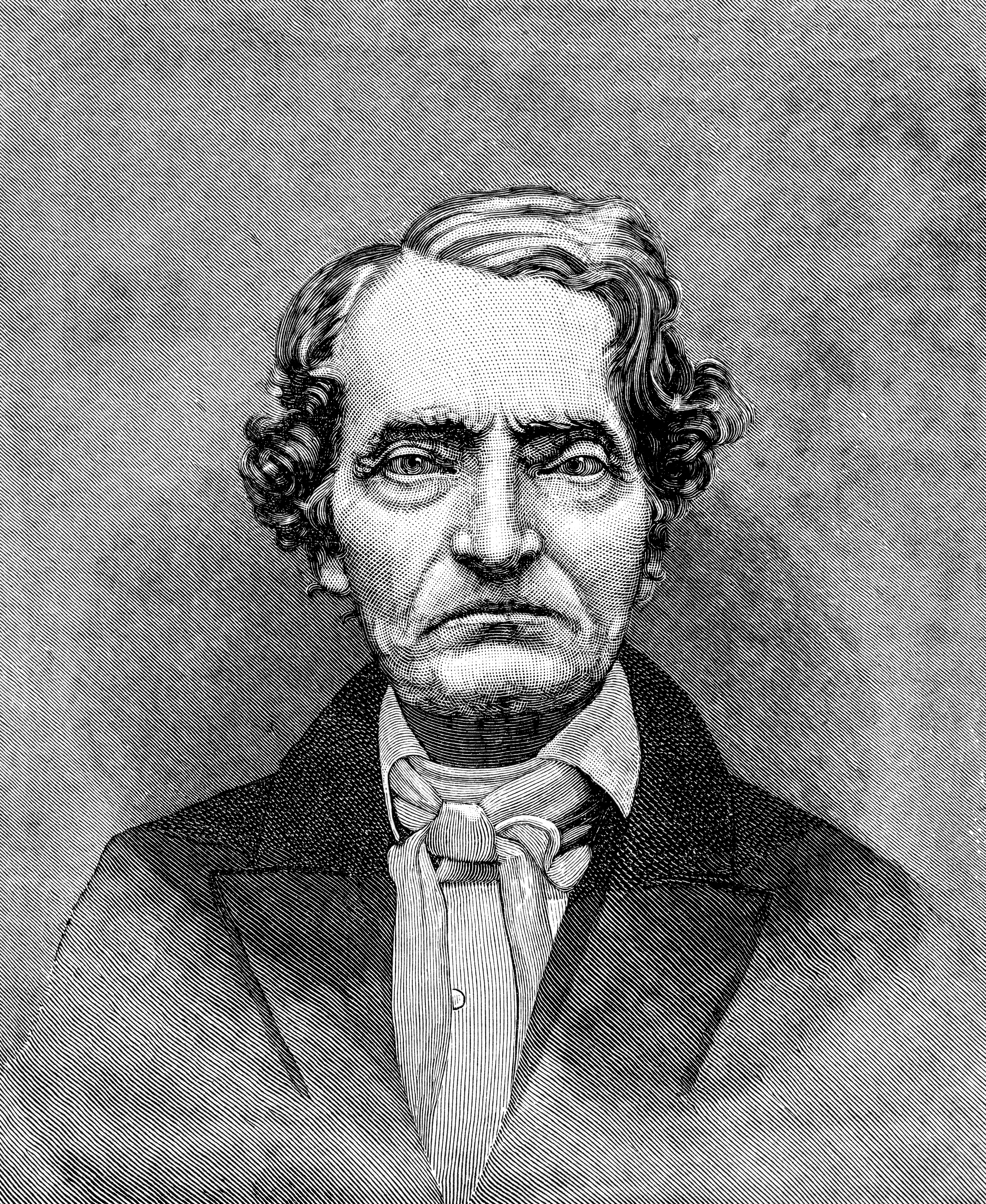
- Engraving

4th Mayor of Providence, Rhode Island
- In office June 1853 – June 1854
- Preceded by: Amos C. Barstow
- Succeeded by: Edward P. Knowles

Personal details
- Born: Walter Raleigh Danforth; April 1, 1787 Providence, Rhode Island, US
- Died: August 11, 1861 (aged 74) Providence, Rhode Island, US
- Resting place: Swan Point Cemetery
- Party: Democrat
- Education: Brown University
- Occupation: Journalist, politician

Walter Raleigh Danforth (April 1, 1787 – August 11, 1861) was a jurist, journalist, and 4th mayor of Providence, Rhode Island 1853-1854.

== Early life ==
Danforth was born April 1, 1787, in Providence, Rhode Island, son of Job Danforth. He graduated from Brown University in 1805. He studied law.

== Careers ==
Danforth was clerk of the Supreme Judicial Court for Providence County from 1807 to 1818 in the Court of Common Pleas.

In 1820 he entered journalism as editor and joint owner of the Providence Gazette newspaper. As a journalist, he became known for his wit and political satire. The Gazette often supported the Federalists. He was also affiliated with the publications the Microcosm, the Express, and the Republican Herald.

Danforth was an ardent supporter of President Andrew Jackson, who appointed him Collector of Customs in Providence from 1829 until his retirement in 1841. Danforth left retirement in 1853 to become mayor for a single term, and after that he was elected to a single term in the General Assembly.

Danforth was also a historian and lecturer on the history of Providence. He also led the Providence Association of Mechanics and Manufacturers, which is now known as the Board of Trade and Chamber of Commerce.

Danforth died at his home in Providence August 11, 1861 and was buried at Swan Point Cemetery.

Political offices
Preceded by Amos C. Barstow	Mayor of Providence; 1853-1854	Succeeded by Edward P. Knowles
