= Jabez C. Knight =

American politician

Jabez Comstock Knight
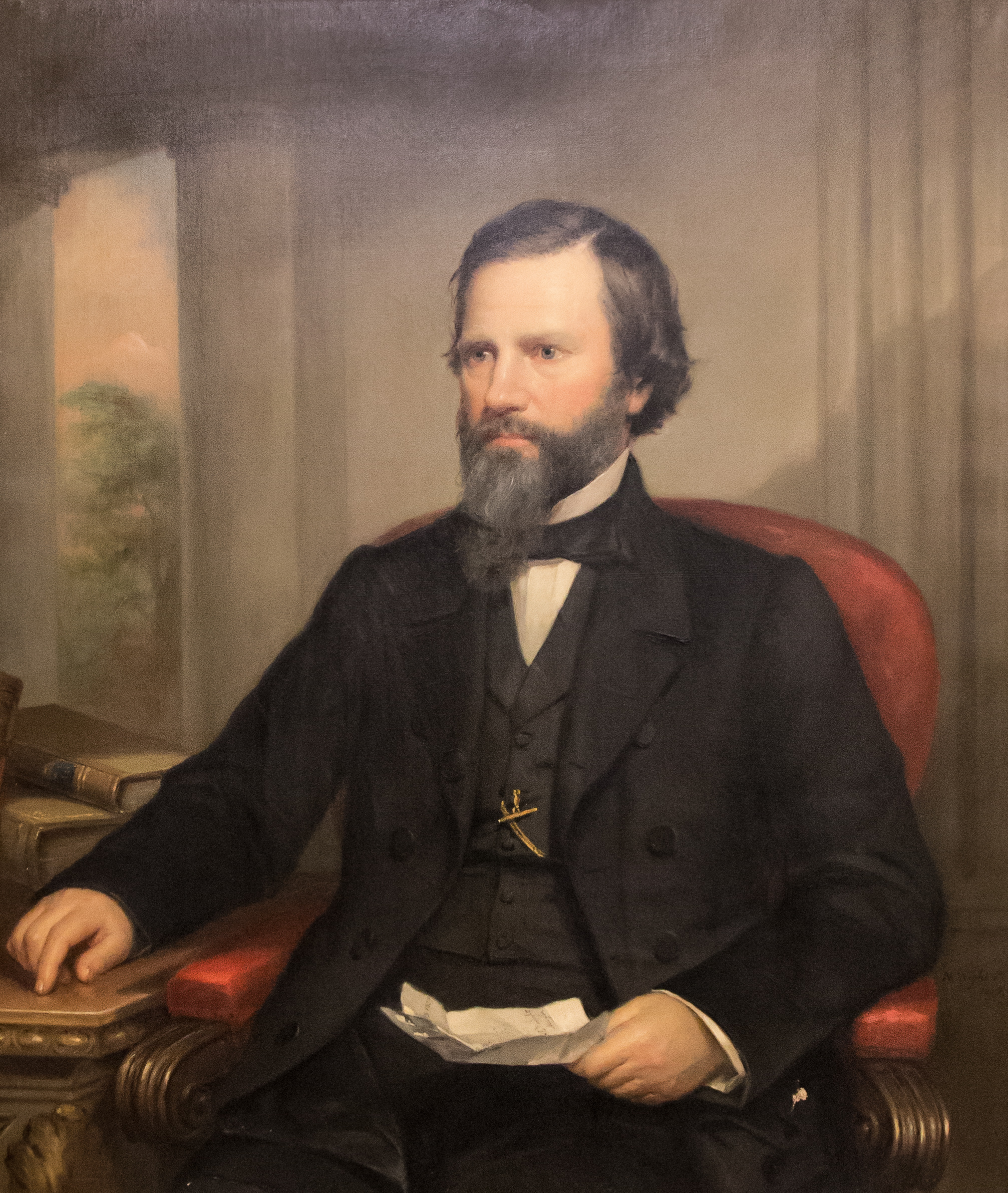
- Official painting in Providence City Hall

8th Mayor of Providence, Rhode Island
- In office June 6, 1859 – June 5, 1864
- Preceded by: William M. Rodman
- Succeeded by: Thomas A. Doyle

Personal details
- Born: July 31, 1815 Centerville, Rhode Island, U.S.
- Died: April 6, 1900 (aged 84)
- Resting place: Swan Point Cemetery
- Party: Republican
- Known for: Mayor of Providence, Rhode Island

Jabez Comstock Knight (July 31, 1815 – April 6, 1900) was mayor of Providence, Rhode Island, for five terms, 1859-1864.

== Early life ==
Knight was born in Centerville, Rhode Island. His family moved to Providence in 1830, when he was 15. He was employed by cotton merchants Orray Taft & Co.

== Career ==
He became Paymaster General for Rhode Island for 24 years, and was on the board of trustees of the Providence Reform School He was a trustee of Butler Hospital for 35 years. Knight was a member of the Providence Common Council, representing the Fourth Ward, 1849-1852. He was elected to the Providence Board of Aldermen for the Sixth Ward, 1854-1858.

== Mayor ==
In May 1859 Knight ran for mayor against a Democratic opponent. He won 1,835 votes to 1,100. He then ran four more times unopposed, then declined nomination for a sixth term.

As Mayor, Knight demolished the Town House on Benefit Street that served as police station, and opened a new Central Police Station on Canal Street in April 1861. Knight introduced horse-drawn streetcars in Providence in 1863.

Knight served as mayor during the Civil War. During this time Providence industries provided uniforms, blankets, biscuits, rifles, and tools to the Union war effort.

== Personal life ==
Knight married Catherine A. Taft on September 28, 1842, and had three daughters.

In the 1880s, Ex-Mayor Knight spent his summers at a cottage in Newport, Rhode Island, on Bellevue Avenue.

Knight died on April 6, 1904, and is buried at Swan Point Cemetery.

Political offices
Preceded by William M. Rodman	Mayor of Providence; 1859–1864	Succeeded by Thomas A. Doyle
