= Henry Rodman Barker =

American politician

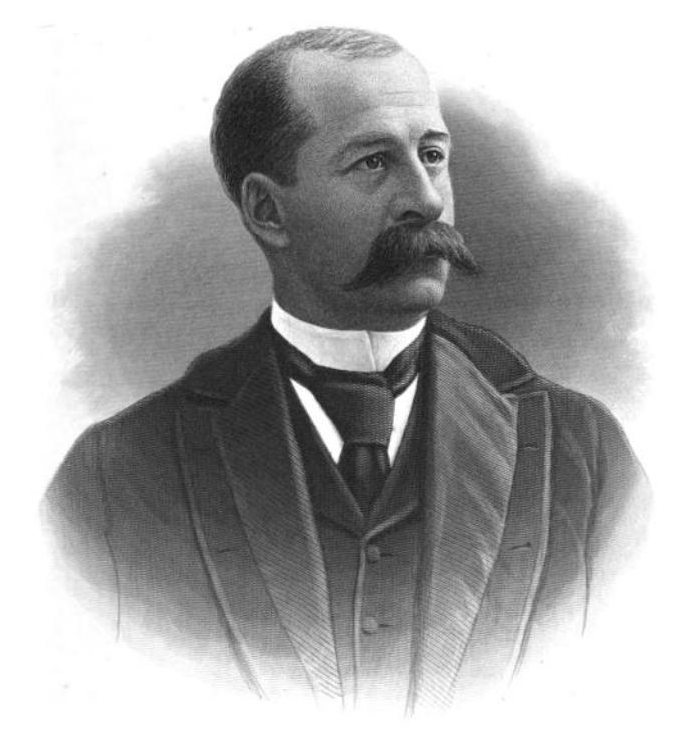

15th Mayor of Providence, Rhode Island
- In office January 1889 – January 1891
- Preceded by: Gilbert F. Robbins
- Succeeded by: Charles Sydney Smith

Personal details
- Born: Henry Augustus Rodman Barker; September 15, 1841 Providence, Rhode Island, U.S.
- Died: March 17, 1901 (aged 59) ^{[A]} Providence, Rhode Island, U.S.
- Resting place: Swan Point Cemetery
- Party: Republican
- Spouse: Annie C. Tripp
- Parent(s): William Cornell Barker and Sarah A. Jencks
- Occupation: Banker and politician
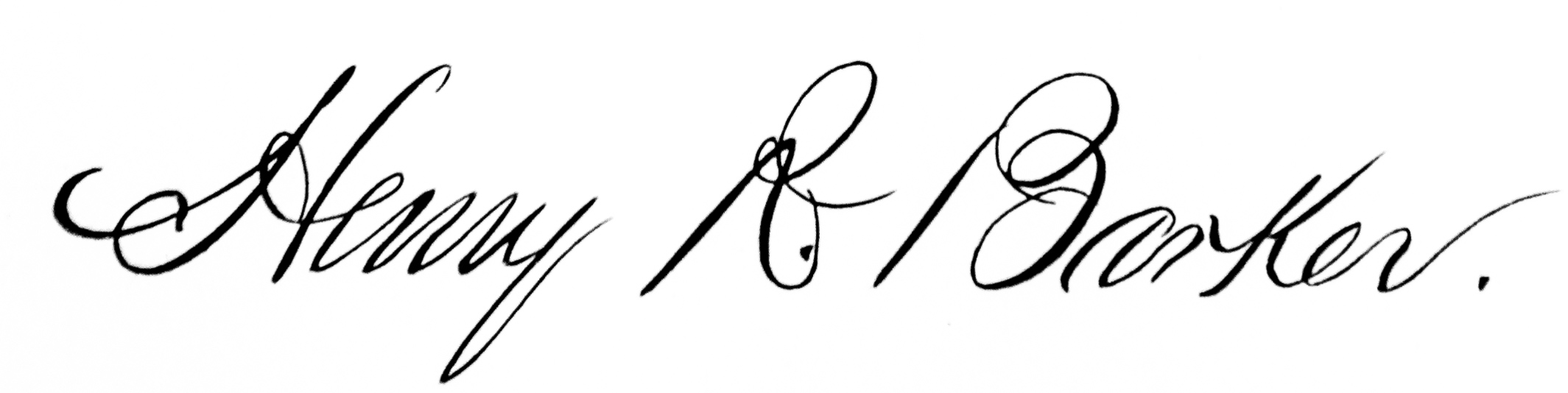
- Signature

Military service
- Allegiance: (United States) United States; Union
- Branch/service: United States Army; Union Army
- Rank: Sergeant
- Unit: 10th Rhode Island Infantry
- Battles/wars: American Civil War

Henry Rodman Barker (September 15, 1841 – March 17, 1901)^{[A]} was 15th mayor of Providence, Rhode Island 1889-1891.

== Personal life ==
Henry Rodman Barker was born "Henry Augustus Rodman Barker" in Providence, Rhode Island on September 15, 1841, to William Cornell Barker and Sarah A. Jencks.

He attended public schools in Providence and graduated from high school in 1859. A year later, he went to work for the Providence Mutual Fire Insurance Company. When the Civil War broke out, he enlisted as sergeant of Company I, Tenth Rhode Island Regiment for one term of service, then returned to the insurance company. From that time on, he was an active member of the Grand Army of the Republic.

Barker was associated with several banks, including Samuel P. Colt's Industrial Trust Company, the Rhode Island Investment Company, the Rhode Island Electric Protective Company, the Old Colony Cooperative Bank, the Roger Williams Savings Fund and Loan Association, and the Boston Investment Company.

Barker joined the Masons in 1862, and belonged to Grace Episcopal Church.

Barker married Annie C. Tripp, daughter of Stephen A. and Jane Ames Tripp, of New Bedford in October 1864. They had two children.

Barker died suddenly on March 17, 1901,^{[A]} at his home in Providence while getting ready for church. The cause was apparently heart failure. He was buried at Swan Point Cemetery.

== City council ==
Barker served seven years on the city council, serving from 1873 to 1880.

As a city councilman, Barker was a strong supporter of Mayor Doyle's introduction of modern infrastructure systems, needed as Providence grew into a modern city. These improvements included waterworks and a sewage system, modern schools, and improvements in municipal services.

== Mayor ==
As mayor, Barker called for city funding of the public library, which previously had been privately funded. He improved the sewage system and improved the railroad terminal.

== Notes ==
a. Some sources give an incorrect year for Barker's death. His obituary was published in the Providence Daily Journal on 18 March 1901, confirming the 17 March 1901 date, which is consistent with his tombstone.

Political offices
Preceded by Gilbert F. Robbins	Mayor of Providence; 1889-1891	Succeeded by Charles Sydney Smith
