= Horace, Nebraska =

Unincorporated community in Nebraska, U.S.

Coordinates: 41°32′35″N 98°40′24″W

Horace is an unincorporated community in Greeley County, Nebraska, in the United States.

== History ==
Horace, like Greeley County, was named for Horace Greeley, a newspaper editor and politician of the mid-19th century who encouraged western settlement with the motto "Go West, young man".

A post office was established in Horace in 1890, and remained in operation until it was discontinued in 1942.

Several buildings still stand on the site.
