= Frank F. Olney =

18th Mayor of Providence, Rhode Island

Frank Fuller Olney
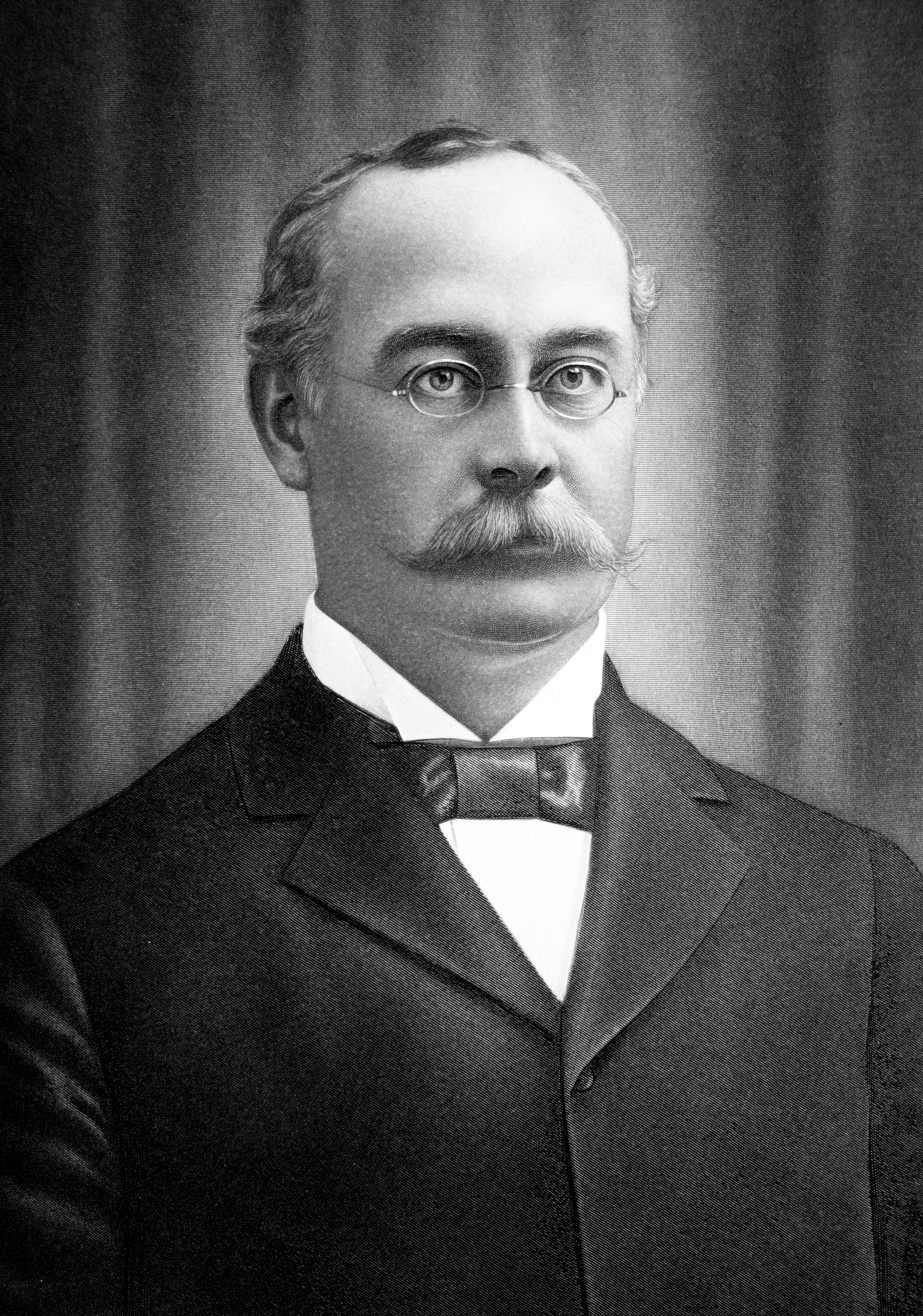

18th Mayor of Providence, Rhode Island
- In office January 1894 – January 1896
- Preceded by: William Knight Potter
- Succeeded by: Edwin D. McGuinness

Personal details
- Born: March 12, 1851 Jersey City, New Jersey, US
- Died: October 24, 1903 (aged 52) Providence, Rhode Island, US
- Resting place: Swan Point Cemetery
- Party: Republican
- Spouse: Lizzie F. Dow

Frank Fuller Olney (March 12, 1851 – October 24, 1903) was the 18th mayor of Providence, Rhode Island. He served from 1894 until 1896.

== Personal life ==
Frank Olney was born March 12, 1851, in Jersey City, New Jersey to Elam Ward Olney and Helen Fuller. The Olney family was one of the oldest in Providence; his ancestor Thomas Olney was a companion of Roger Williams in 1636. The family lent its name to the Olneyville neighborhood and Olney Street.

His family returned to their ancestral home city of Providence in 1860 when Frank was age nine. Frank's father died two years later, in 1862, and Frank went to live with his uncle, a founder of the Wanskuck Company in Providence. He attended public schools and graduated from the University Grammar School in 1867. Upon his uncle's death, seventeen-year-old Frank inherited his interest in the Wanskuck Company.

Olney married Lizzie F. Dow, daughter of George Smith Dow and Abigail Livermore Dow, of the Livermore family of Boston. They had three children, one of whom died in infancy.

=== Memberships ===
Olney was a member of numerous social clubs and organizations. He was a member of the First Congregational Church, Unitarian (now the First Unitarian Church of Providence). He was a member of the Corinthian Lodge and Pomham Club. He was also a member of the Squantum Association, Hope Club, Athletic Club, Providence Art Club, Providence Whist Club, Rhode Island Philatelic Society, Rhode Island Temperance League, Rhode Island Veteran Citizens' Historical Association, the Rhode Island School of Design, and Home Market Club of Boston, among others.

Olney joined Company D of the First Light Infantry Regiment of Providence in 1882 and worked his way up to Colonel, a position he held until his death.

=== Yachtsman ===
Olney was an ardent yachtsman. He joined the Rhode Island Yacht Club in 1892, and became Commodore in 1902. He was also a member of the New York Yacht Club. He owned several racing boats over the years, including the steam yacht "L Pli Cita", the prize-winning sloop "Amy", the schooner yacht "Rusalka" and the "Ingomar."

=== Philatelist ===
Olney was an ardent and well-known stamp collector. He was profiled in an 1894 journal of the American Philatelic Association shortly after becoming mayor, and was later president of that group for three terms. Olney's collection was recognized by that publication as one of the finest in the nation.

== Political career ==
In 1889 Olney became chairman of the Republican City Committee and was elected to the first of three terms on the City Council; in 1892 he served on the Board of Aldermen from the first Ward.

Olney was elected Mayor of Providence for three consecutive terms in 1893, 1894, and 1895. During his tenure, plans for the new downtown Union Railroad Station were drawn up, and construction began on elevated passenger railroad tracks. The final horsecar lines were removed in 1894 and replaced with a new electric streetcar system. The Red Bridge (replaced by the Henderson Bridge in 1969) opened to traffic on December 23, 1895.

Following his time as mayor, Olney was appointed as chairman of the Board of Police Commissioners and of the Board of Park Commissioners. He held both those offices at the time of his death.

== Death and burial ==
Olney caught a cold during a trip to London and died at his home in Providence on October 24, 1903 of pneumonia. A memorial service was held in his honor on Monday, December 14, 1903, attended by the First Light Infantry Regiment. He was buried at Swan Point Cemetery.

Political offices
Preceded by William Knight Potter	Mayor of Providence; 1894-1896	Succeeded by Edwin D. McGuinness
