= Edward P. Knowles =

American politician

Edward Peck Knowles
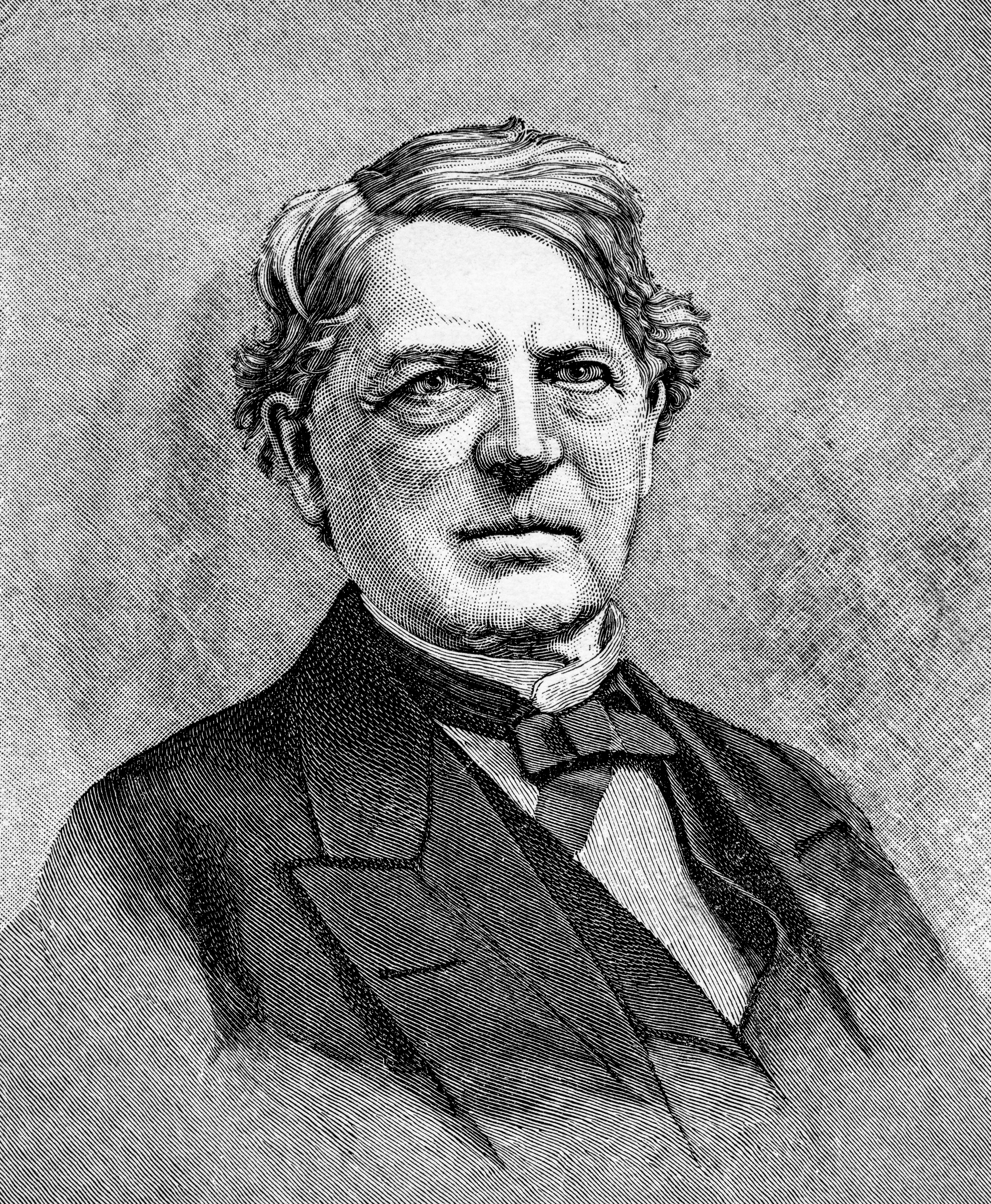
- Engraving from the book "The Providence Plantations for 250 Years", 1886.

5th Mayor of Providence, Rhode Island
- In office June 1854 – June 1855
- Preceded by: Walter R. Danforth
- Succeeded by: James Y. Smith

Personal details
- Born: April 13, 1805 Providence, Rhode Island, U.S.
- Died: October 16, 1881 (aged 76)
- Resting place: Swan Point Cemetery
- Party: Whig
- Known for: Mayor of Providence, Rhode Island

Edward Peck Knowles (April 13, 1805 – October 16, 1881): Mayor of Providence, Rhode Island, for one term, 1854–1855.

== Early life ==
Edward Knowles was born April 13, 1805, in Providence, Rhode Island. His schooling opportunities have been described as "limited". In his youth he worked in a wool factory.

== Business career ==
Knowles was involved in several businesses. He sold jewelry, including clocks and watches, until 1842. Later, he became director of the Fifth National Bank of Providence, president of the Butler Insurance Company, and president of the Mechanics Association.

== Political career ==
He held a number of local offices including common council, alderman, school committee, and General Assembly. He was appointed acting mayor several times, and finally mayor in 1854. As mayor he took an active part in suppressing the Dorr Rebellion. His main political interests appear to be his support of education, particularly evening schools, and temperance.

== Personal life ==
Knowles was widowed several times and had a total of three wives. He married Mary F. Fry in 1827; Alice S. Randall in 1860; and Elizabeth H. Crowell in 1872.

Political offices
Preceded by Walter R. Danforth	Mayor of Providence; 1854-1855	Succeeded by James Y. Smith
