= Charles Matteson =

American judge (1840–1925)

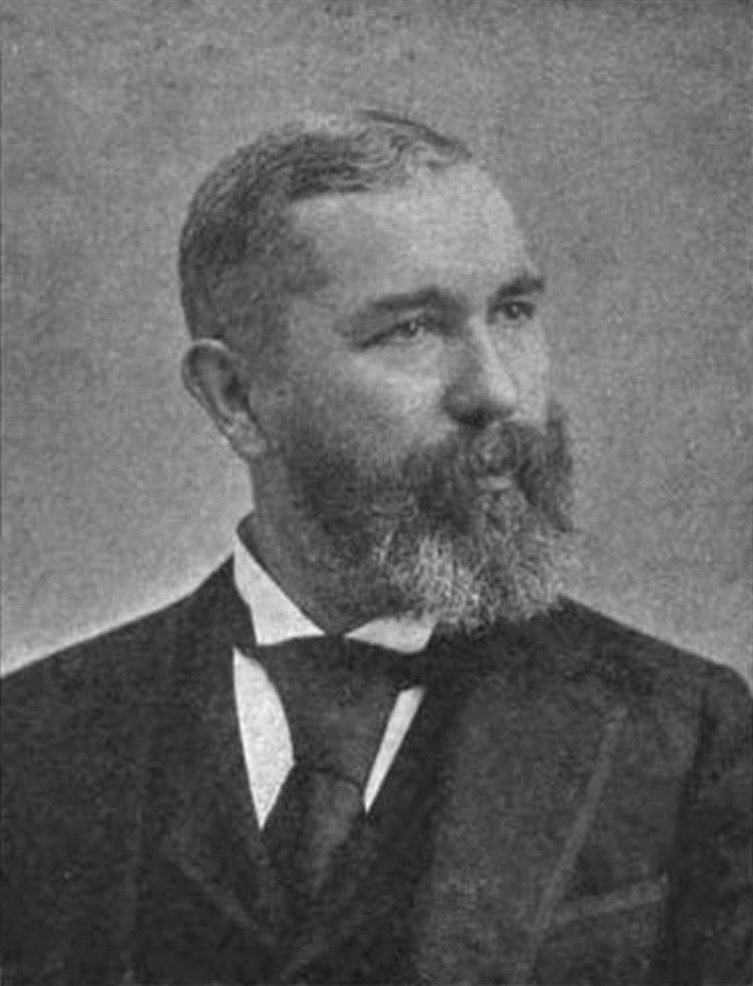
Rhode Island Supreme Court Justice Charles Matteson, from The Green Bag (1890).

Charles Matteson (March 21, 1840 – August 14, 1925) was a justice of the Rhode Island Supreme Court from 1875 to 1900, serving as chief justice from 1891 to 1900.

== Early life and career ==
Born in Coventry, Rhode Island, Matteson was the son of Asahel and Julia M. (Johnson) Matteson. He attended a private school in Providence, and after working as a clerk in his father's store for two years, attended the University Grammar School, and the Providence Conference Seminary in East Greenwich, for a time. In 1857, he entered Brown University, from which he received an A.B. in 1861. Having decided to become a lawyer, he then read law for a year in the office of Wingate Hayes, then United States district attorney for the State of Rhode Island. Matteson studied law at Harvard Law School from 1862 to 1863, and was admitted to the Rhode Island bar in January 1864.

He then entered the practice of law in Providence, Rhode Island, having a solo practice for a year before entering into a partnership with Wingate Hayes. Their firm was dissolved in July 1871, with Matteson retiring from trial practice in order to focus on corporation practice, a field in which he developed a reputation for expertise. He became the attorney and counsel for various corporations and later served as a director and trustee of a number of corporate concerns. He also served as a member of the Rhode Island Senate from 1871 to 1873.

== Judicial service ==
Matteson was elected an associate justice of the supreme court of Rhode Island on February 11, 1875, by the Republican votes in the state legislature, to fill the vacancy caused by the elevation of Justice Durfee to the office of chief justice. In July 1891, Matteson succeeded Durfee as chief justice. On May 22, 1900, he retired from the bench and embarked on a period of travels to other parts of the world. In June 1900, he went to Europe, returning in October 1902, and in June 1904, he went to Asia.

== Personal life ==
Matteson married Belle Himes of Warwick, Rhode Island on August 22, 1872. They had three sons, Archibald, Arnold, and Paul. Matteson died in Providence.

Political offices
Preceded by Thomas Durfee	Associate Justice of the Rhode Island Supreme Court; 1875–1891	Succeeded by Horatio Rogers
Preceded by Thomas Durfee	Chief Justice of the Rhode Island Supreme Court; 1891–1900	Succeeded by John H. Stiness
