= Charles Sydney Smith (mayor) =

16th mayor of Providence, Rhode Island, US

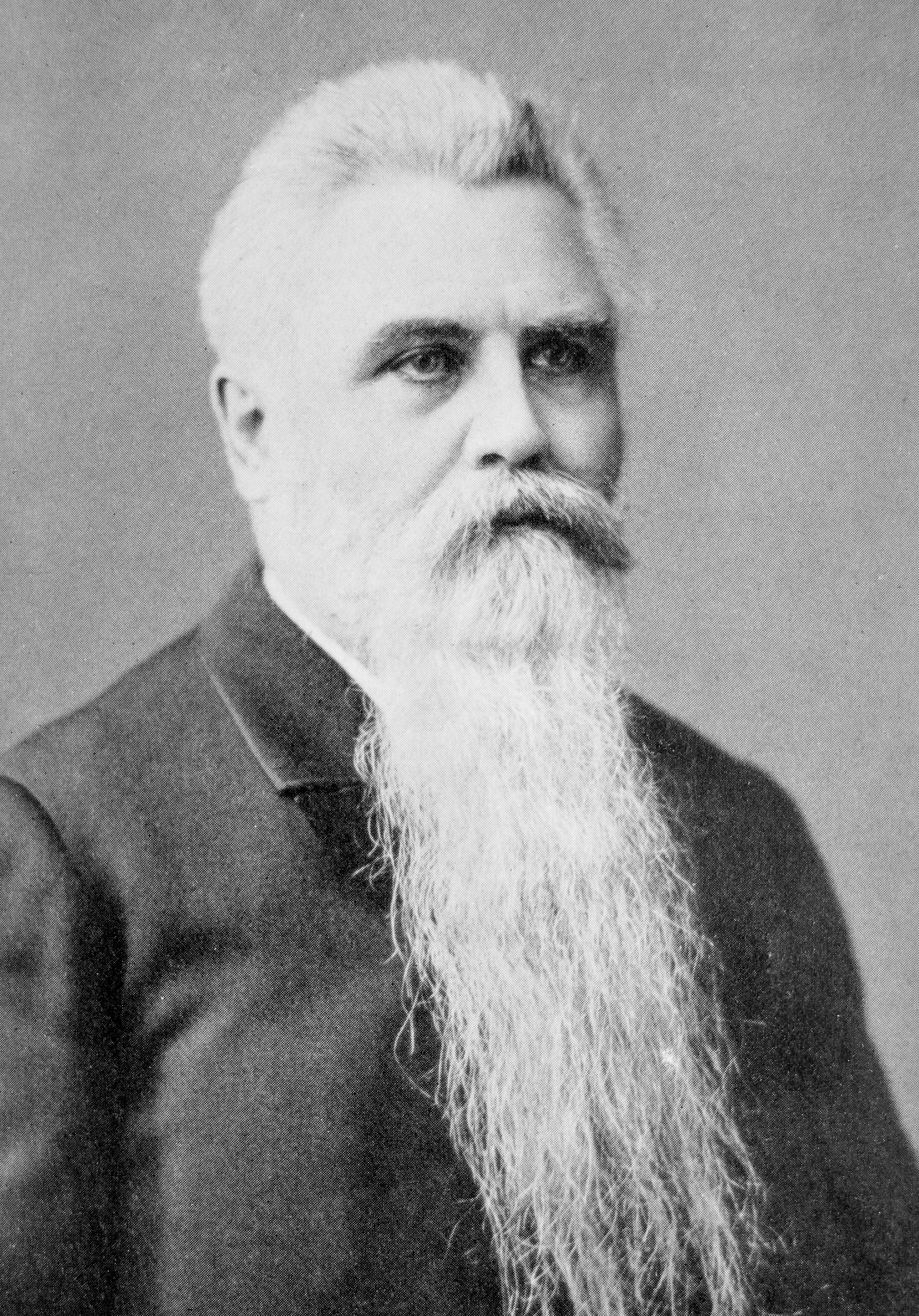

16th Mayor of Providence, Rhode Island
- In office January 1891 – January 1892
- Preceded by: Henry Rodman Barker
- Succeeded by: William Knight Potter

Personal details
- Born: October 4, 1828 Warren, Rhode Island, U.S.
- Died: August 12, 1907 (aged 78) Providence, Rhode Island, U.S.
- Cause of death: Pneumonia
- Party: Republican
- Spouse(s): Lavinia Winberg Gorgas, Mary Ann Fish
- Parent(s): Elisha Galusha Smith, Abby Carpenter
- Occupation: Jeweller
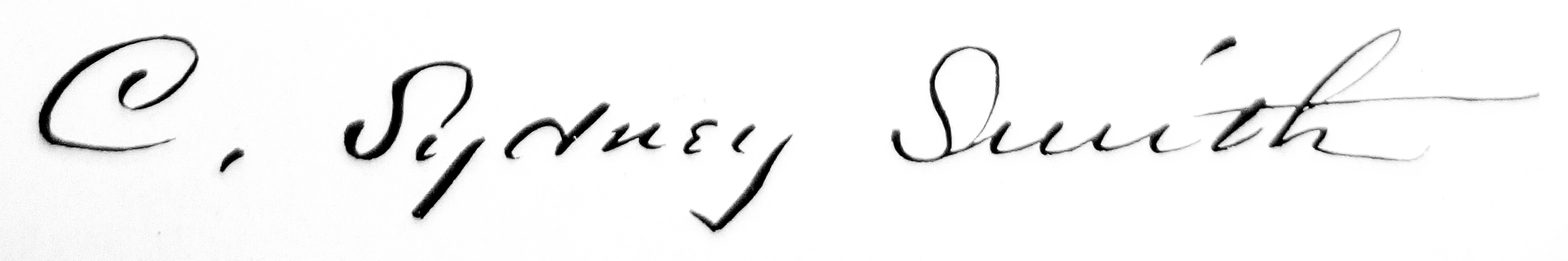
- Signature

Charles Sydney Smith (October 4, 1828 – August 12, 1907) was 16th mayor of Providence, Rhode Island, in office between 1889 and 1891.

== Personal life ==
Charles Sydney Smith was born October 4, 1828, in Warren, Rhode Island. At age 12 he moved with a relative to Bureau County, Illinois, which was at that time the far West. He spent four years there working on a farm. The nearest school was three miles away, and he attended school only a few weeks each winter.

Smith's first wife was Lavinia Winberg Gorgas, daughter of George Gorgas of Philadelphia. They married on December 12, 1849, and had two children. She died February 26, 1857, aged 23 years. In 1858 Smith married Mary Ann Fish, daughter of John and Nancy Fish of East Greenwich, Rhode Island; they had one daughter.

Smith was an active mason for over forty years. He died in his home at 315 Elmwood Avenue in Providence of pneumonia, early in the morning of August 12, 1907. He had been bedridden for a week, and unconscious for three days.

== Jewelry career ==
By age 18, Smith was in Newark, New Jersey, learning the jewelry trade. He returned to Rhode Island, eventually working for Sackett, Davis, & Co, jewelers on Richmond Street in Providence.

Jewelry manufacture and trade was emerging as one of the major industries in Providence at the time. By some accounts, there were 57 firms and 590 workers in the jewelry trade in pre-Civil War Providence.

== Civil War ==
In September 1861, after the start of the Civil War, Smith joined the 4th Rhode Island Infantry, where he became First lieutenant and quartermaster under General Parke. He took part in Burnside's North Carolina Expedition and participated in the battles of Roanoke, New Bern, and Fort Macon. He returned to Rhode Island in Fall 1862, once again working for Sackett, Davis & Co, where he eventually became superintendent. In 1870 he partnered with Samuel W. Saxton of New York to form Saxton, Smith & Co, which made solid gold chains. He was also president of the United Wire and Supply Company.

== Political life ==
Smith served in politics for over thirty years. He served on the common council, state assembly, and state senate before running for mayor. He was elected mayor in 1890 and served for one term. His efforts to bring law and order to Providence resulted in his defeat for re-election by a "tolerant electorate [which was] inclined to look the other way."

After his mayorship, Smith was elected Commissioner of Sinking Funds.

Political offices
Preceded by Henry Rodman Barker	Mayor of Providence; 1891-1892	Succeeded by William Knight Potter
