= William Knight Potter =

American politician

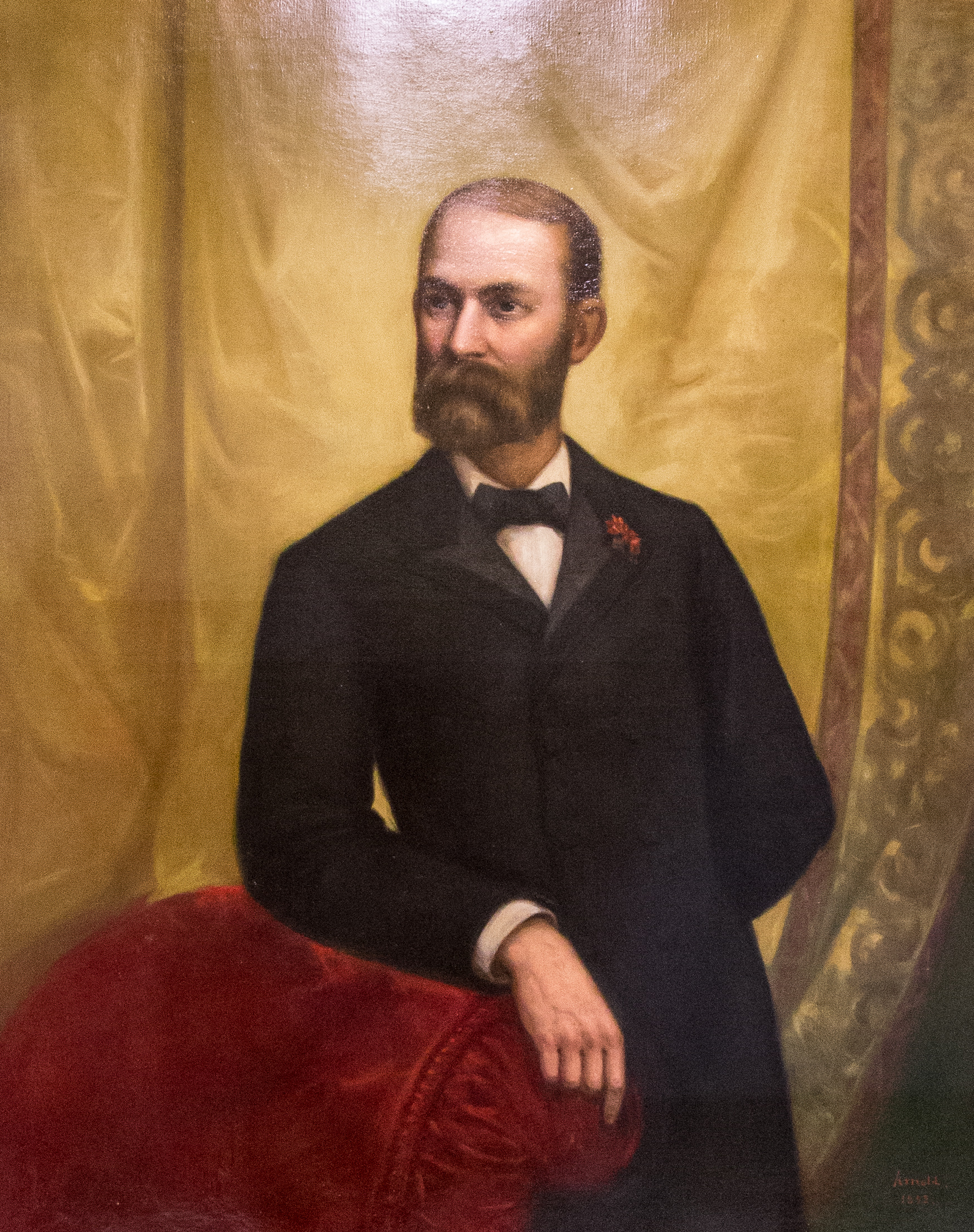
- Official portrait in Providence City Hall

17th Mayor of Providence, Rhode Island
- In office January 4, 1892 – January 1, 1894
- Preceded by: Charles S. Smith
- Succeeded by: Frank F. Olney

Personal details
- Born: December 27, 1844 New York City, New York, U.S.
- Died: August 13, 1914 (aged 69) Providence, Rhode Island, U.S.
- Resting place: Oakland Cemetery, Cranston
- Party: Democratic
- Spouse: Anna Rice
- Occupation: Lumber businessman
- Known for: Mayor of Providence, Rhode Island

William Knight Potter (December 27, 1844 – August 13, 1914) was an American businessman and the 17th Mayor of Providence, Rhode Island, 1892-1894.

== Early life ==
William was born December 27, 1844, in New York City and spent his early years there. His father was Arthur M. Potter, a jewelry manufacturer. The Potters moved to Providence and William graduated from Providence High School in 1862.

At age 18, Potter got his first job working as a bookkeeper for the Archibald B. Rice Lumber Company; in 1872, he married the owner's daughter. In 1881 he became a partner in the business, which was renamed A.B. Rice & Company.

== Political life ==
Potter was a lifelong Democrat. Between 1887 and 1891 he was elected four times to the State House of Representatives and worked his way up to the chairmanship of the House Finance Committee. On November 24, 1891, he defeated incumbent Charles Sydney Smith in a tightly contested four-way race for Mayor of Providence. No candidate received a majority, so a runoff election was held. Potter won by just over 600 votes. He was the first Democrat elected to the mayor's office since the Civil War.

Running for re-election in 1892, Potter handily defeated Republican candidate Col. Arthur H. Watson.

After his second term was over, Potter declined to run for a third term, and returned to the lumber business. After retirement, he lived in Cranston for a time.

=== Accomplishments ===
During Potter's two terms as mayor, the landscaped boulevards of Elmwood Avenue and Blackstone Boulevard were constructed. He also embarked on a major project paving city streets in 1892.

== Personal life ==
On October 23, 1872, he married Anna Rice, daughter of the owner of the Archibald B. Rice Lumber Company (and Potter's employer). They had four sons.

Potter died on August 13, 1914, at his home in Edgewood, Providence, of paralytic shock. He had been ill for three months.

Political offices
Preceded by Charles S. Smith	Mayor of Providence; 1892-1894	Succeeded by Frank F. Olney
