= Greeley County, Nebraska =

County in Nebraska, United States

- County
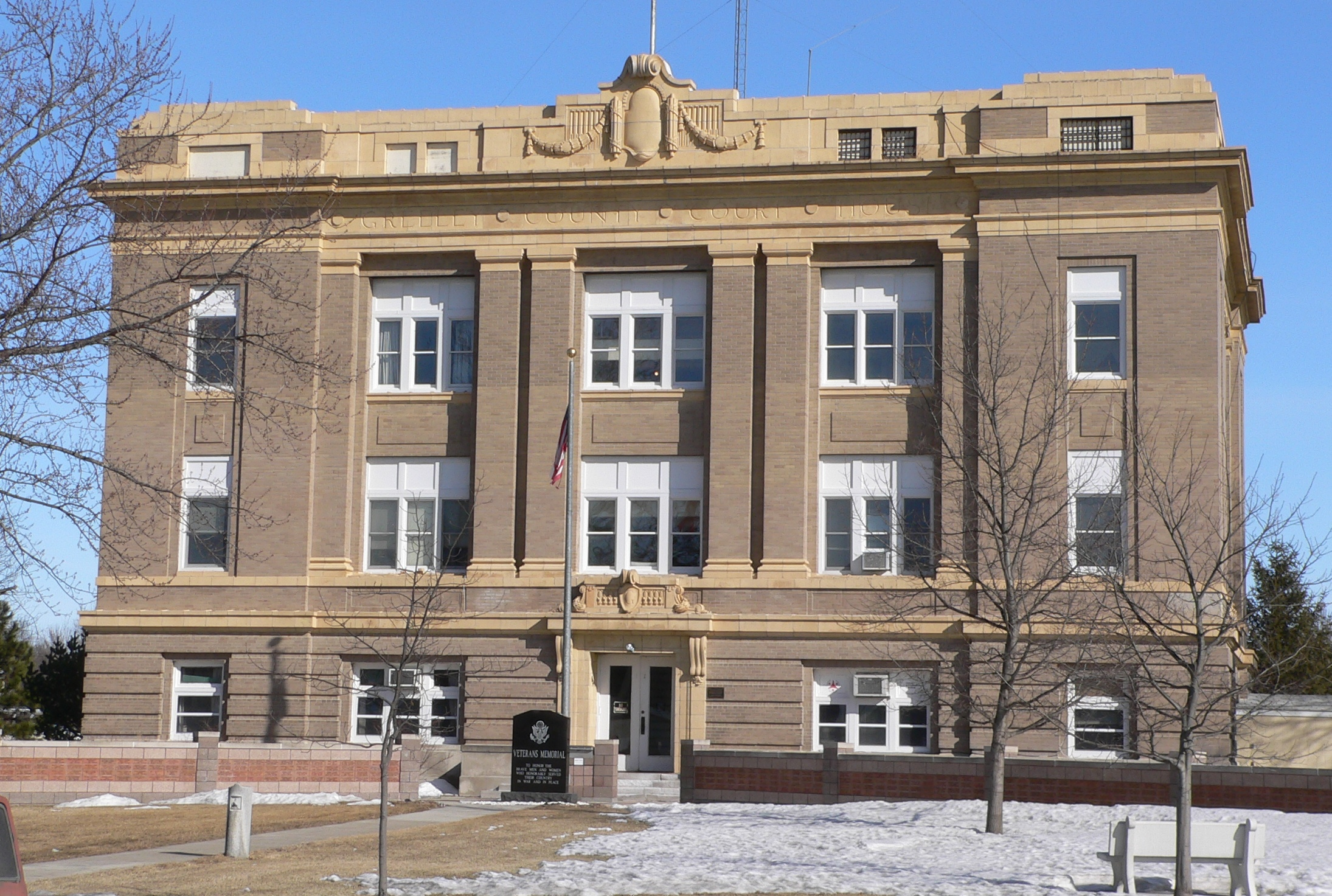
- Greeley County Courthouse in Greeley

- Location within the U.S. state of Nebraska
- Coordinates: 41°34′N 98°31′W
- Country: United States
- State: Nebraska
- Founded: 1871 (created); 1872 (organized)
- Named for: Horace Greeley
- Seat: Greeley Center
- Largest village: Spalding

Area
  - Total: 571 sq mi (1,480 km^{2})
  - Land: 570 sq mi (1,500 km^{2})
  - Water: 0.8 sq mi (2.1 km^{2}) 0.1%

Population (2020)
  - Total: 2,188
  - Estimate (2025): 2,154 ▼
  - Density: 3.8/sq mi (1.5/km^{2})
- Time zone: UTC−6 (Central)
  - Summer (DST): UTC−5 (CDT)
- Congressional district: 3rd
- Website: www.greeleycounty.ne.gov

Greeley County is a county in the U.S. state of Nebraska. As of the 2020 Census, the population was 2,188. Its county seat is Greeley Center, also known simply as Greeley.

In the Nebraska license plate system, Greeley County is represented by the prefix 62 (it had the 62nd-largest number of vehicles registered in the county when the license plate system was established in 1922).

== History ==
Greeley County was created in 1871 and organized in 1872. It was named after Horace Greeley, a newspaper editor and politician of the mid-19th century. Greeley encouraged western settlement with the motto "Go West, young man."

== Geography ==
The Cedar River flows southeastward through the NE corner of Greeley County, and the North Loup River flows SSE through the SW corner of the county.

According to the US Census Bureau, the county has a total area of 571 square miles (1,480 km^{2}), of which 570 square miles (1,500 km^{2}) is land and 0.8 square miles (2.1 km^{2}) (0.1%) is water.

=== Major highways ===
- U.S. Highway 281
- Nebraska Highway 11
- Nebraska Highway 22
- Nebraska Highway 56
- Nebraska Highway 91

=== Adjacent counties ===
- Wheeler County (north)
- Boone County (northeast)
- Nance County (southeast)
- Howard County (south)
- Sherman County (southwest)
- Valley County (west)

== Demographics ==
Historical population
Census	Pop.	Note	%±
1880	1,461		—
1890	4,869		233.3%
1900	5,691		16.9%
1910	8,047		41.4%
1920	8,685		7.9%
1930	8,442		−2.8%
1940	6,845		−18.9%
1950	5,575		−18.6%
1960	4,595		−17.6%
1970	4,000		−12.9%
1980	3,462		−13.4%
1990	3,006		−13.2%
2000	2,714		−9.7%
2010	2,538		−6.5%
2020	2,188		−13.8%
2025 (est.)	2,154	▼	−1.6%
US Decennial Census

=== 2020 census ===
As of the 2020 census, the county had a population of 2,188. The median age was 46.3 years. 23.4% of residents were under the age of 18 and 25.8% of residents were 65 years of age or older. For every 100 females there were 103.2 males, and for every 100 females age 18 and over there were 101.0 males age 18 and over.

The racial makeup of the county was 96.1% White, 0.0% Black or African American, 0.2% American Indian and Alaska Native, 0.3% Asian, 0.0% Native Hawaiian and Pacific Islander, 1.7% from some other race, and 1.6% from two or more races. Hispanic or Latino residents of any race comprised 2.4% of the population.

0.0% of residents lived in urban areas, while 100.0% lived in rural areas.

There were 948 households in the county, of which 25.5% had children under the age of 18 living with them and 21.4% had a female householder with no spouse or partner present. About 35.5% of all households were made up of individuals and 21.2% had someone living alone who was 65 years of age or older.

There were 1,189 housing units, of which 20.3% were vacant. Among occupied housing units, 82.1% were owner-occupied and 17.9% were renter-occupied. The homeowner vacancy rate was 1.6% and the rental vacancy rate was 12.4%.

=== 2000 census ===
As of the 2000 United States census, there were 2,714 people, 1,077 households, and 734 families in the county. The population density was 5 people per square mile (1.9 people/km^{2}). There were 1,199 housing units at an average density of 2 units per square mile (0.77/km^{2}).

The racial makeup of the county was 97.94% White, 0.66% Black or African American, 0.07% Native American, 0.07% Asian, 0.77% from other races, and 0.48% from two or more races. 0.85% of the population were Hispanic or Latino of any race.

There were 1,077 households, out of which 29.30% had children under the age of 18 living with them, 59.00% were married couples living together, 6.40% had a female householder with no husband present, and 31.80% were non-families. 30.50% of all households were made up of individuals, and 18.80% had someone living alone who was 65 years of age or older. The average household size was 2.46 and the average family size was 3.08.

The county population contained 26.90% under the age of 18, 5.90% from 18 to 24, 21.60% from 25 to 44, 22.40% from 45 to 64, and 23.20% who were 65 years of age or older. The median age was 42 years. For every 100 females there were 97.10 males. For every 100 females age 18 and over, there were 92.20 males.

The median income for a household in the county was $28,375, and the median income for a family was $34,159. Males had a median income of $22,036 versus $17,056 for females. The per capita income for the county was $13,731. About 11.90% of families and 14.60% of the population were below the poverty line, including 12.10% of those under age 18 and 20.50% of those age 65 or over.

== Communities ==
=== Villages ===
- Greeley Center
- Scotia
- Spalding
- Wolbach (part)

=== Unincorporated communities ===
- Belfast
- Brayton
- Horace
- O'Connor
- Scotia Junction

== Politics ==
Greeley County residents vote powerfully Republican. In no national election since 1976 has the county selected the Democratic Party candidate.

United States presidential election results for Greeley County, Nebraska
Year	Republican		Democratic		Third party(ies)	
Year	No.	%	No.	%	No.	%
1900	463	34.17%	880	64.94%	12	0.89%
1904	836	54.25%	447	29.01%	258	16.74%
1908	691	38.26%	1,072	59.36%	43	2.38%
1912	371	21.25%	913	52.29%	462	26.46%
1916	627	31.60%	1,289	64.97%	68	3.43%
1920	1,345	51.38%	1,180	45.07%	93	3.55%
1924	773	26.48%	1,220	41.80%	926	31.72%
1928	1,457	40.88%	2,098	58.87%	9	0.25%
1932	817	21.83%	2,832	75.66%	94	2.51%
1936	1,107	31.40%	1,988	56.40%	430	12.20%
1940	1,530	50.46%	1,502	49.54%	0	0.00%
1944	1,242	49.54%	1,265	50.46%	0	0.00%
1948	829	39.59%	1,265	60.41%	0	0.00%
1952	1,543	62.55%	924	37.45%	0	0.00%
1956	1,240	57.67%	910	42.33%	0	0.00%
1960	960	43.18%	1,263	56.82%	0	0.00%
1964	775	37.26%	1,305	62.74%	0	0.00%
1968	882	50.03%	739	41.92%	142	8.05%
1972	1,005	56.94%	760	43.06%	0	0.00%
1976	787	46.05%	877	51.32%	45	2.63%
1980	1,028	63.26%	495	30.46%	102	6.28%
1984	948	65.74%	485	33.63%	9	0.62%
1988	763	53.06%	670	46.59%	5	0.35%
1992	588	41.44%	435	30.66%	396	27.91%
1996	642	50.27%	472	36.96%	163	12.76%
2000	839	64.05%	416	31.76%	55	4.20%
2004	865	69.31%	361	28.93%	22	1.76%
2008	715	59.63%	458	38.20%	26	2.17%
2012	820	69.20%	340	28.69%	25	2.11%
2016	912	77.62%	210	17.87%	53	4.51%
2020	1,016	80.70%	229	18.19%	14	1.11%
2024	1,030	83.40%	192	15.55%	13	1.05%

== See also ==
- National Register of Historic Places listings in Greeley County, Nebraska
