= Gilbert F. Robbins =

American politician

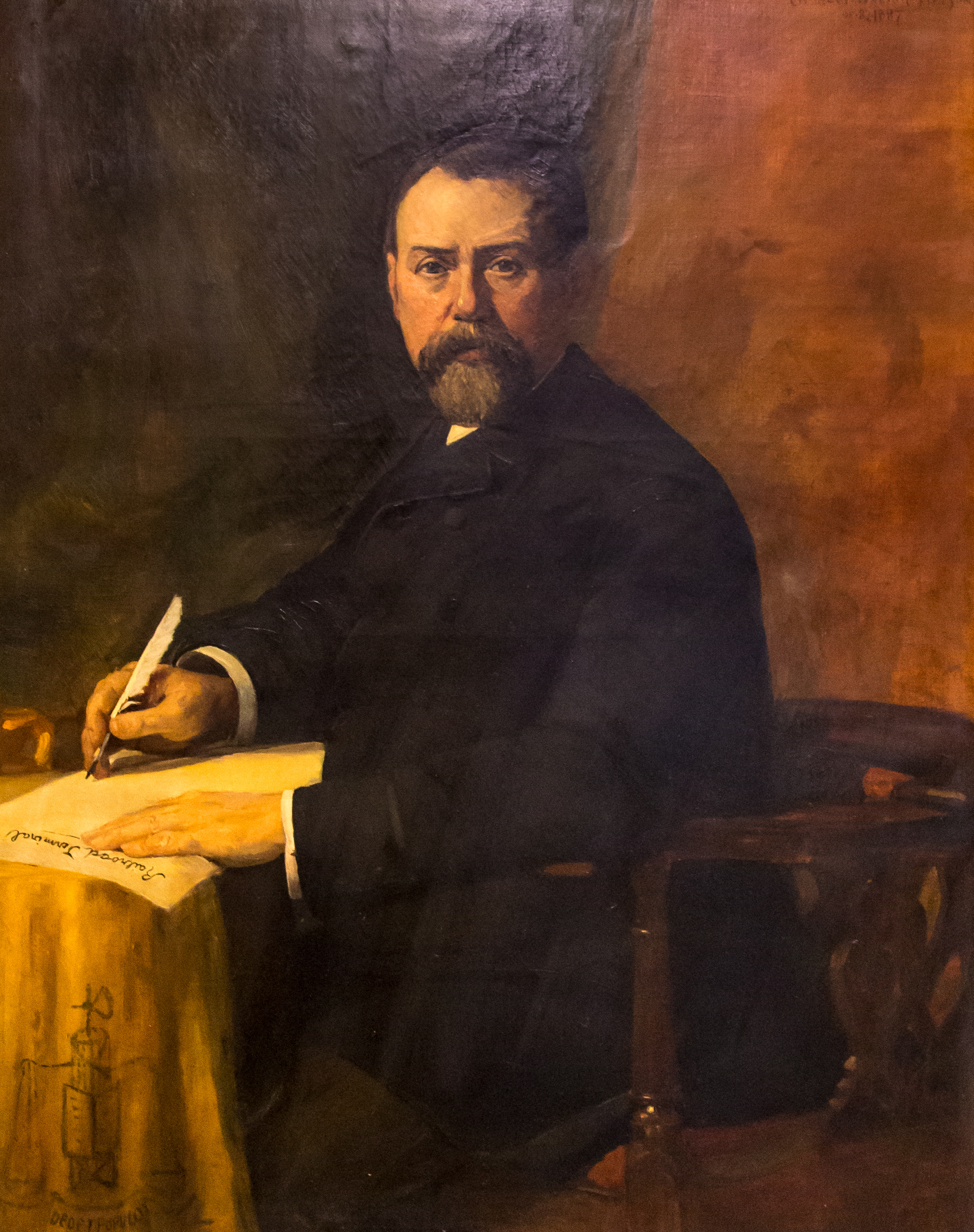
- Official portrait in Providence City Hall

14th Mayor of Providence, Rhode Island
- In office June 9, 1886 – January 7, 1889
- Preceded by: Thomas A. Doyle
- Succeeded by: Henry Rodman Barker

Personal details
- Born: August 26, 1838 Burrillville, Rhode Island, U.S.
- Died: September 27, 1889 (aged 51) Providence, Rhode Island, U.S.
- Resting place: Swan Point Cemetery
- Party: Republican
- Spouse: Susan Olive Arnold Whipple
- Known for: Mayor of Providence, Rhode Island
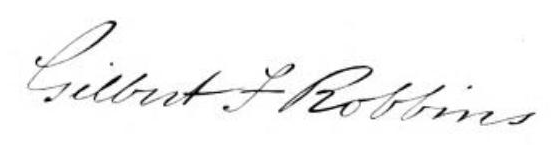
- Signature

Gilbert F. Robbins (1838–1889) was the mayor of Providence, Rhode Island, from 1887 to 1889.

== Early life ==
Robbins was born in Burrillville, Rhode Island, to a family of farmers. He attended public schools until age 17, at which time he attended the academy at East Greenwich, where he studied "good hand-writing and ... book-keeping." Upon finishing his studies, he joined brother-in-law Serril Mowry's ready-made clothing business. The firm, Mowry, Robbins & Company, was successful.

Robbins was interested in politics and rose through the ranks. He was elected to the Common Council from the 7th Ward in 1879, then to the General Assembly. By 1883 he was president of the Board of Aldermen.

== Mayor of Providence ==
As president of the Board of Aldermen, Robbins became acting mayor of Providence upon the death of Thomas A. Doyle. He won re-election in 1887 and 1888.

During his tenure, he oversaw construction of a cable car tramway on Providence's East Side and electrification of city streets.

== Personal life ==
Robbins married Susan Olive Arnold Whipple, daughter of Manning Arnold, of Burrilville, in 1866. They had no children. He was a Freemason and Universalist.

He died on September 27, 1889, of heart failure and is buried at Swan Point Cemetery.

Political offices
Preceded by Thomas A. Doyle	Mayor of Providence; 1886-1889	Succeeded by Henry Rodman Barker
