= Charles Brayton (judge) =

American judge (1772–1834)

Charles Ray Brayton (October 31, 1772 – November 16, 1834) was a Rhode Island public figure who served as a justice of the Rhode Island Supreme Court from may 1814 to May 1818, and again from 1827 until his death in 1834.

== Early life, education, and career ==
Born in Warwick, Rhode Island, to Daniel and Elizabeth (Atwood) Brayton, Brayton attended the local schools, but supplemented his education at home with the aid of his father and mother. Early in life he learned the trade of blacksmith, but later abandoned this to enter the field of public affairs, for which he was described as "well fitted both by reason of diligent study and tastes".

In 1794 he was admitted a freeman of Warwick, and the following year was elected to the office of constable. At the outbreak of the American Revolution he enlisted in the Pawtuxet Rangers and served under Captain Benjamin Arnold. In 1796 he was chosen first lieutenant of the Second Company of Warwick Militia, and in 1797 elected captain. In 1798 he became town sergeant and collector of taxes, in which office he served for five years. During this entire period he was "studying earnestly to prepare himself for more important public posts". In 1804, Brayton was chosen town clerk of Warwick, and continued to fill that office until his death, with the assistance of his sons in later years, when his time was employed with larger affairs. In 1808 he became colonel of the famous Kentish Artillery, and commanded the corps for five years.

== Judicial and legislative service ==
In 1813, Brayton was chosen Chief Justice of the Court of Common Pleas. In 1814, was elected as a justice of the Rhode Island Supreme Court, and served for four years.

Brayton was elected to the Rhode Island General Assembly in 1820, and re-elected several times. In 1822 he was among members of that body called to revise the laws of the state, and in 1824 he was a member of a convention called to frame a new constitution, which, however, was not accepted by the people. In 1827, on the reorganization of the judiciary of the state, he was again elected to the Supreme Court, and continued to fill that office until his death.

== Personal life ==
Brayton married, in 1795, Rebecca Havens, daughter of William Havens, of Warwick. They were the parents of four children. His grandson, Charles R. Brayton, was also an influential political figure in Rhode Island.
