= Nathan F. Dixon II =

American politician (1812–1881)

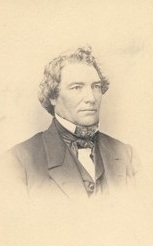

Member of the U.S. House of Representatives from Rhode Island's 2nd district
- In office March 4, 1863 – March 3, 1871
- Preceded by: George H. Browne
- Succeeded by: James M. Pendleton
- In office March 4, 1849 – March 3, 1851
- Preceded by: Benjamin Babock Thurston
- Succeeded by: Benjamin Babock Thurston

Chairman of the U.S. House Committee on Commerce
- In office 1869–1871
- Preceded by: Thomas D. Eliot
- Succeeded by: Samuel Shellabarger

Member of the Rhode Island House of Representatives
- In office 1841–1849; 1851–1854; 1858–1862; 1871–1877

Personal details
- Born: May 1, 1812 Westerly, Rhode Island, U.S.
- Died: April 11, 1881 (aged 68) Westerly, Rhode Island, U.S.
- Resting place: River Bend Cemetery; Westerly, Rhode Island
- Party: Whig; Republican
- Spouse: Harriet Palmer Swan (m. 1843-1881, his death)
- Relations: Nathan F. Dixon I (father)
- Children: 6, including Nathan F. Dixon III
- Education: Brown University
- Occupation: Attorney; Banker

Nathan Fellows Dixon (May 1, 1812 – April 11, 1881) was an attorney and bank president from Westerly, Rhode Island. The son of Nathan F. Dixon and father of Nathan F. Dixon III, he was best known for his service as a United States representative from Rhode Island from 1849 to 1851, and again from 1863 to 1871.

== Biography ==
He was born in Westerly, Rhode Island on May 1, 1812, the son of Nathan F. Dixon and Elizabeth (Palmer) Dixon). He attended Plainfield Academy in Plainfield, Connecticut, and graduated from Brown University in 1833. He later pursued the study of law at Harvard Law School and Yale Law School. Dixon was admitted to the bar in 1837 and commenced practice in Westerly. He was a member of the board of directors of Westerly's Washington Bank, and succeeded his father as president when the senior Dixon died in 1842. He served as president of the bank until his death.

He was a member of the Rhode Island House of Representatives from 1841 to 1849 and 1851 to 1854. He was appointed a member of the Rhode Island Governor's council in 1842, one of a committee of legislators who advised Whig Governor Samuel Ward King as the state coped with an anti-government uprising by Democrats known as the Dorr Rebellion. In 1844, Dixon was a presidential elector from Rhode Island; the Whigs lost the national election but carried the state, and he cast his ballot for the Whig ticket of Henry Clay and Theodore Frelinghuysen.

He was elected as a Whig to the 31st Congress (March 4, 1849 – March 3, 1851). He was not a candidate for renomination in 1850. He was again elected to the Rhode Island House, as a Republican, in 1858, and served until 1862. Dixon was elected as a Republican to the 38th Congress. He was reelected three times, and served from March 4, 1863 to March 3, 1871. In his final term, Dixon was chairman on the Committee on Commerce. He was elected delegate to the 1866 National Union Convention in Philadelphia. He declined to be a candidate for reelection to Congress in 1870.

He served in the Rhode Island House again from 1871 to 1877. In January 1875 he was a leading candidate for the Republican nomination for U.S. Senator, but withdrew when the party's caucus in the state legislature deadlocked, which enabled the election of Ambrose E. Burnside. In March, he was a contender for the Republican nomination for governor, but withdrew in favor of Henry Lippitt. When none of the candidates received a majority in the general election, as required by the state constitution, Lippitt was elected governor by a vote of the state legislature.

== Death and burial ==
Dixon died in Westerly on April 11, 1881. He was buried at River Bend Cemetery in Westerly.

== Family ==
In 1843, Dixon married Harriet Palmer Swan (1816–1896) of Stonington, Connecticut. They were the parents of six children: Nathan (b. 1845, died young); Nathan Fellows (1847–1897); Edward Hazard (1849–1891); Phebe Ann (1852–1941), the wife of James Gore King McClure; Walter P. (1855–1913); and Harriet Swan (1859–1899).

U.S. House of Representatives
Preceded by Benjamin Babock Thurston	Member of the U.S. House of Representatives from Rhode Island's 2nd congressional district 1849–1851	Succeeded by Benjamin Babock Thurston
Preceded by George H. Browne	Member of the U.S. House of Representatives from Rhode Island's 2nd congressional district 1863–1871	Succeeded by James M. Pendleton
