= Thomas Durfee =

American judge (1826–1901)

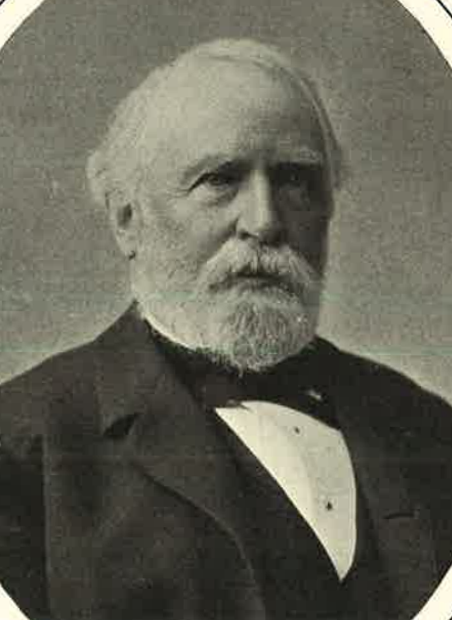

9th Chancellor of Brown University
- In office 1879–1888
- Preceded by: Benjamin F. Thomas
- Succeeded by: William Goddard

Personal details
- Born: February 6, 1826 Tiverton, Rhode Island
- Died: June 6, 1901 (aged 75) Providence, Rhode Island
- Education: Brown University

Thomas Durfee (February 6, 1826 – June 6, 1901) was an associate justice of the Rhode Island Supreme Court from May 1865 to January 1875, and chief justice from January 1875 to 1891.

== Early life, education, and career ==
Born in Tiverton, Rhode Island, to Job Durfee and Judith (Borden) Durfee, his father also served on the state supreme court. Durfee "inherited a judicial mind, and was brought up in an atmosphere adapted to prepare him for judicial service". He was educated in the school of Rev. James Richardson, at East Greenwich, Rhode Island, and received a degree from Brown University, with honors, in 1846. After reading law for two years in Providence, he was admitted to the bar in 1848, and in 1849 he was appointed reporter of the decisions of the Supreme Court.

== Judicial and political service ==
Durfee's judicial service began in 1854, when he was elected an assistant magistrate of the court of magistrates of the City of Providence, which was a local court of inferior jurisdiction. From 1855 to 1860 he was presiding magistrate of that court. During the early years of his professional life he wrote jointly with Joseph K. Angell a Treatise on the Law of Highways. He was a representative in the Rhode Island General Assembly in 1863, Speaker of the House in 1864, and State Senator in 1865. During the American Civil War, he "was a frequent contributor to the papers, and his pen was powerful in support of the Union cause".

In May 1865, he became an associate justice of the state supreme court, appointed from Providence, and in January 1875 he was elevated to chief justice, remaining in that office until 1891. Durfee served on the state supreme court for 26 years. Although entitled to retire upon full salary by 1890, he continued to perform his judicial duties. In 1890, the members of the Rhode Island bar arranged for his portrait to be placed in the law library of the state. In addition to his service on the court, he was a Trustee of Brown University from 1875 to 1888, and Chancellor of Brown University from 1879 to 1888, and thereafter a Fellow of Brown University until his death, also being conferred the degree of LL.D. by the institution. He also wrote extensively, his books including Thoughts on the Constitution of Rhode Island, which was "a vigorous defence of the institutions of the State", and Gleanings from the Judicial History of Rhode Island, presenting a more narrative style of writing. In 1872 he published a small volume of poems.

== Personal life and death ==
On October 29, 1857, Durfee married Sarah Jane Slater, with whom he had one son, Samuel Slater Durfee. Durfee died in Providence from heart disease at the age of 75.

Political offices
Preceded by Sylvester G. Shearman	Associate Justice of the Rhode Island Supreme Court; 1865–1875	Succeeded by Elisha R. Potter
Preceded by George A. Brayton	Chief Justice of the Rhode Island Supreme Court; 1875–1891	Succeeded by Charles Matteson
