= Amos C. Barstow =

American politician (1813–1894)

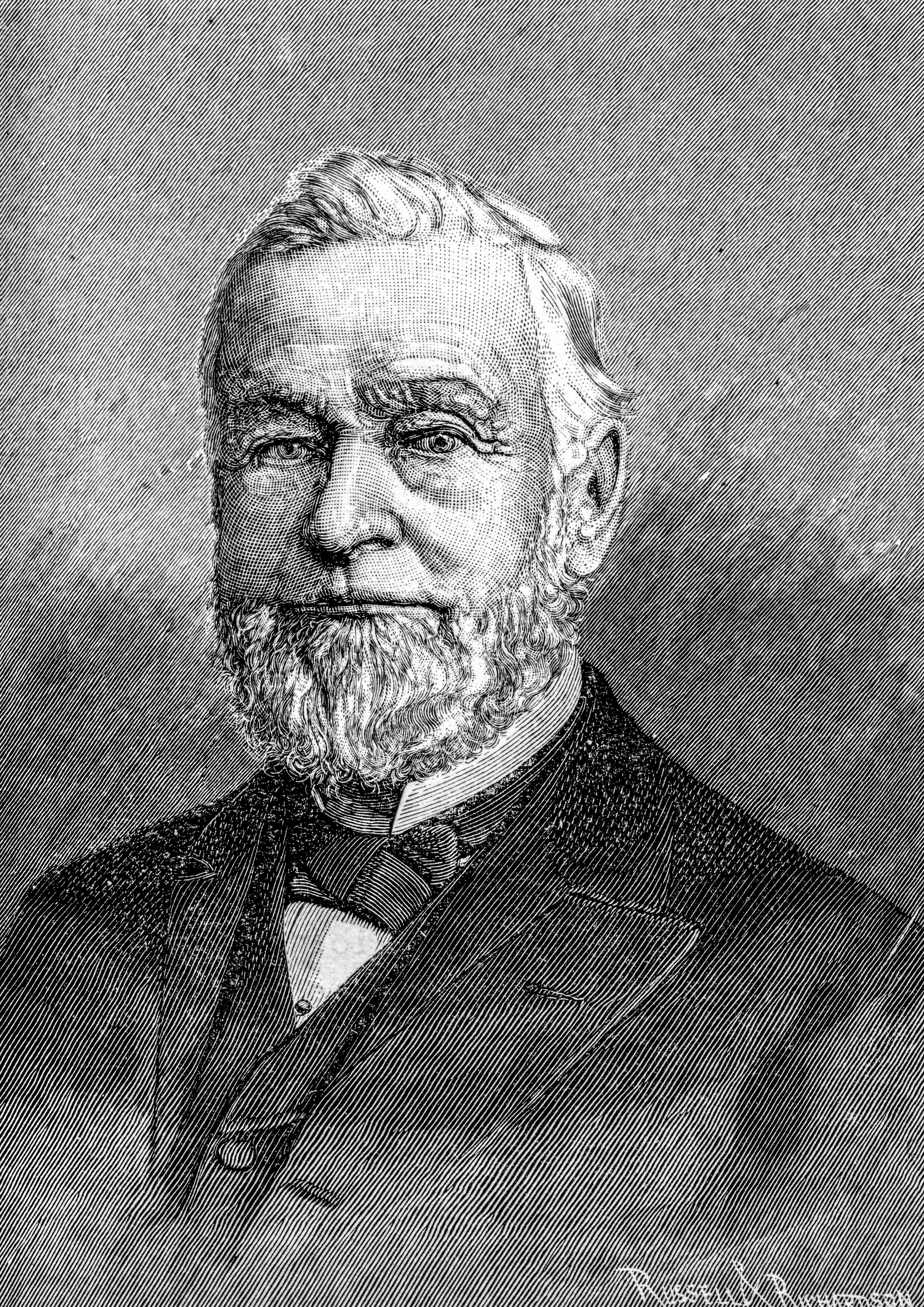
- Engraving

3rd Mayor of Providence, Rhode Island
- In office June 1852 – June 1853
- Preceded by: Thomas M. Burgess
- Succeeded by: Walter R. Danforth

Personal details
- Born: April 30, 1813 Providence, Rhode Island, U.S.
- Died: September 5, 1894 (aged 81)
- Resting place: Swan Point Cemetery
- Party: Temperance Party; Whig
- Spouse: Emeline Mumford Eames
- Known for: Mayor of Providence, Rhode Island

Amos Chafee Barstow (April 30, 1813 – September 5, 1894) was an American politician and businessperson. He served as the mayor of Providence, Rhode Island, for one term, 1852–1853.

== Early life ==
Barstow was born in Providence. He attended public schools as well as three terms in private school.

== Business career ==
Barstow was involved in several businesses, including banking; he was president of the City Bank and helped establish the Mechanics Savings Bank. He was the first president of the Providence YMCA, and built the Providence Music Hall. But Barstow's main business venture was the Barstow Stove Company, which made cooking stoves. His company won a medal at the 1873 World's Fair in Vienna for having the best stove.

== Political career ==
Barstow was active in the Temperance movement. While otherwise a Whig, in 1847, he ran for Mayor on the Temperance Party ticket and lost. In 1851 Barstow was elected to the Rhode Island General Assembly, and on January 27, 1852, Barstow delivered a prominent speech to the Rhode Island House of Representatives in favor of Rhode Island's Maine law, which was one of the early temperance bills in the United States (so named because it was modeled after an 1851 temperance law in Maine). In May 1852, Rhode Island's "Maine Law" was passed, making the sale and consumption of liquor illegal in Maine for eleven years.

Barstow was inaugurated Mayor of Providence on June 7, 1852, and served one term.

After serving as mayor, Barstow returned to the Rhode Island General Assembly. Barstow was chairman of the committee which planned the current Providence City Hall. In 1855, it was Barstow who recommended the site where City Hall was later built. He also became active in the abolition movement, and gave various speeches predicting the end of slavery.

In 1875, President Grant appointed Barstow to the Board of Indian Commissioners, and he spent much of his time visiting the American West.

== Personal life ==
Barstow was an avid Congregationalist. He attended Beneficent Congregational Church starting 1832, and helped found the High Street Congregational Church in 1834, where he became deacon. He married Emeline Mumford Eames on May 28, 1834, and had seven children; five girls and two boys.

Political offices
Preceded by Thomas M. Burgess	Mayor of Providence; 1852–1853	Succeeded by Walter R. Danforth
