= William C. Cozzens =

American politician

William Cozzens
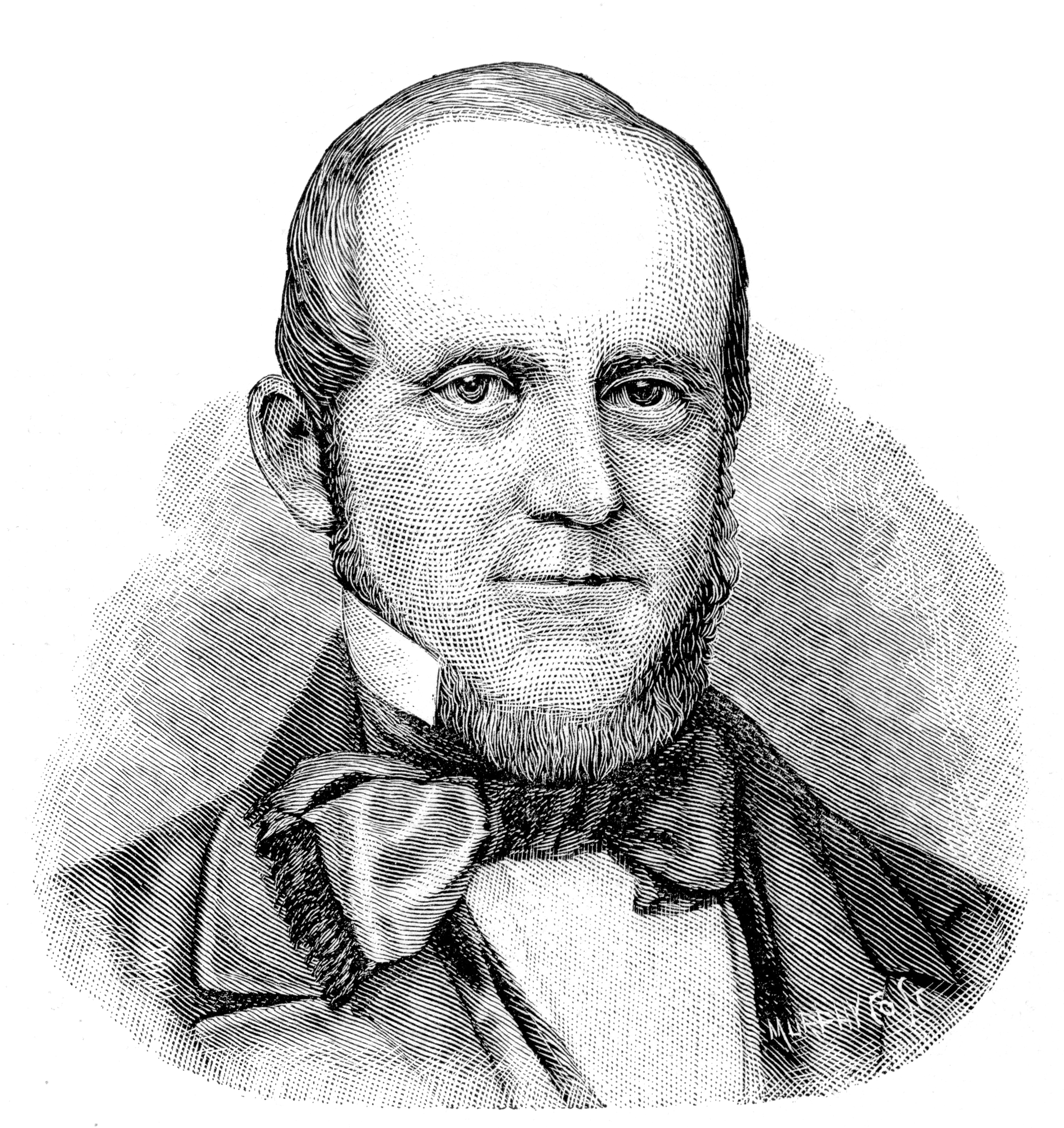

28th Governor of Rhode Island
- In office March 3, 1863 – May 26, 1863
- Preceded by: William Sprague IV
- Succeeded by: James Y. Smith

Mayor of Newport
- In office 1854–1855
- Preceded by: George Henry Calvert
- Succeeded by: William Swinburne

Personal details
- Born: August 26, 1811 Newport, Rhode Island, U.C.
- Died: December 17, 1876 (aged 65)
- Resting place: Island Cemetery
- Party: Democratic
- Spouse: Martha Stanton Gould

William Cole Cozzens (August 26, 1811 – December 17, 1876) was an American politician and the 28th governor of Rhode Island.

== Early life ==
Cozzens was born in Newport, Rhode Island, on August 26, 1811.

He married Martha Stanton Gould; the couple had five children. He was a successful dry goods businessman and president of the Rhode Island Union Bank.

== Political career ==
Cozzens was a Democrat. He was a mayor of Newport and represented Newport in both houses of the Rhode Island General Assembly. He was president of the state Senate and thus became governor of Rhode Island on March 3, 1863, when William Sprague resigned to become a US Senator. Cozzens ran in the next gubernatorial election, but lost to Republican James Y. Smith and left office on May 26, 1863. (Normally the lieutenant governor of Rhode Island would become governor in the event of the governor's resignation; however, at that time the office of lieutenant governor was vacant due to the resignation in December 1862 of Lieutenant Governor Samuel G. Arnold to become a United States Senator.)

== Death ==
He died on December 17, 1876, and was interred at the Island Cemetery in Newport.

His great-grandson, James Gould Cozzens, was a Pulitzer Prize-winning novelist.

== Sources ==
- Sobel, Robert and John Raimo. Biographical Directory of the Governors of the United States, 1789–1978. Greenwood Press, 1988. ISBN 0-313-28093-2

Party political offices
Vacant Title last held by William Sprague IV	Democratic nominee for Governor of Rhode Island; 1863	Succeeded by George H. Browne
Political offices
Preceded by William Sprague IV	Governor of Rhode Island; 1863	Succeeded by James Y. Smith
