= List of mayors of Providence, Rhode Island =

The following is a list of mayors of Providence, Rhode Island.

Originally the term for the mayor was one year, from June to June. In 1873, the term was lengthened to January, and then from January to January. In 1913, the term was lengthened to two years, and in January 1967 to four years.

== List ==
| # | Image | Name | Term | Party |
|---|---|---|---|---|
| 1 | | Samuel W. Bridgham | June 1832–December 28, 1840 | Whig |
| 2 | | Thomas M. Burgess | February 2, 1841–June 1852 | Whig |
| 3 | | Amos C. Barstow | June 1852–June 1853 | Whig |
| 4 | | Walter R. Danforth | June 1853–June 1854 | Democrat |
| 5 | | Edward P. Knowles | June 1854–June 1855 | Whig |
| 6 | | James Y. Smith | June 1855–June 1857 | Republican |
| 7 | | William M. Rodman | June 1857–June 1859 | American |
| 8 | | Jabez C. Knight | June 1859–June 1864 | Republican |
| 9 | | Thomas A. Doyle | June 1864–June 1869 | Republican |
| 10 | | George L. Clarke | June 1869–June 1870 | Republican |
| 11 | | Thomas A. Doyle | June 1870–June 1881 | Republican |
| 12 | | William S. Hayward | January 1881–January 1884 | Republican |
| 13 | | Thomas A. Doyle | January 1884–June 9, 1886 | Republican |
| 14 | | Gilbert F. Robbins | June 9, 1886–January 1889 | Republican |
| 15 | | Henry R. Barker | January 1889–January 1891 | Republican |
| 16 | | Charles Sydney Smith | January 1891–January 1892 | Republican |
| 17 | | William Knight Potter | January 1892–January 1894 | Democrat |
| 18 | | Frank F. Olney | January 1894–January 1896 | Republican |
| 19 | | Edwin D. McGuinness | January 6, 1896–January 3, 1898 | Democrat |
| 20 | | William C. Baker | January 1898–January 1901 | Democrat |
| 21 | | Daniel L. D. Granger | January 1901–January 1903 | Democrat |
| 22 | | Augustus S. Miller | January 1903–September 26, 1905 | Democrat |
| 23 | | Elisha Dyer, Jr. | January 1906–November 29, 1906 | Republican |
| 24 | | Patrick J. McCarthy | January 1907–January 1909 | Democratic |
| 25 | | Henry Fletcher | January 1909–January 1913 | Republican |
| 26 | | Joseph H. Gainer | January 1913–January 1927 | Democratic |
| 27 | | James E. Dunne | January 1927–January 1939 | Democratic |
| 28 | | John F. Collins | January 2, 1939–January 6, 1941 | Republican |
| 29 | | Dennis J. Roberts | January 1941–January 1951 | Democratic |
| 30 | | Walter H. Reynolds | January 1951–January 5, 1965 | Democratic |
| 31 | | Joseph A. Doorley, Jr. | January 5, 1965–January 6, 1975 | Democratic |
| 32 | | Vincent "Buddy" Cianci | January 7, 1975–April 25, 1984 | Republican (1974–1982); Independent (1982–1984) |
| 33 | | Joseph R. Paolino | April 25, 1984–January 7, 1991 | Democratic |
| 34 | | Vincent "Buddy" Cianci | January 7, 1991–September 6, 2002 | Independent |
| 35 | | John J. Lombardi | September 6, 2002–January 6, 2003 | Democratic |
| 36 | | David Cicilline | January 6, 2003–January 3, 2011 | Democratic |
| 37 | | Angel Taveras | January 3, 2011–January 5, 2015 | Democratic |
| 38 | | Jorge Elorza | January 5, 2015–January 2, 2023 | Democratic |
| 39 | | Brett Smiley | January 2, 2023–present | Democratic |
| 40 | | David Morales (elect) | Assuming office January 4, 2027 | Democratic |

== See also ==
- Mayoral elections in Providence, Rhode Island
- Timeline of Providence, Rhode Island

== Sources ==
- Mayors of the Town of Cumberland at Cityof.ProvidenceRI.com
- List of mayors (Political Graveyard)
