= Brayton, Nebraska =

Unincorporated community in Nebraska, United States

- Unincorporated Community
- Location within Nebraska Location within the United States
- Coordinates: 41.5°N 98.5°W
- Country: United States
- State: Nebraska
- County: Greeley

Brayton is an unincorporated community in Greeley County, Nebraska, in the United States.

== History ==
Brayton had its start in about 1887 when the Burlington railroad was extended to that point. Brayton was likely named for a settler.

A post office was established in Brayton in 1888, and remained in operation until it was discontinued in 1945.

Today, not much is left of the village. Its main street is a country road, but unless you are looking it's difficult to see the remnants. Several buildings still exist on the site, but the area is hard to reach and overgrown.

== Cultural references ==
Brayton, Nebraska, is the fictional hometown of heroine Heather Montgomery in the 2015 novel "The Long Road to Heaven" by Kathryn Harris. Although the geographic description of the town's location is the same as the actual town that once existed, the characters and businesses mentioned are fictional.
