= William M. Rodman =

American politician

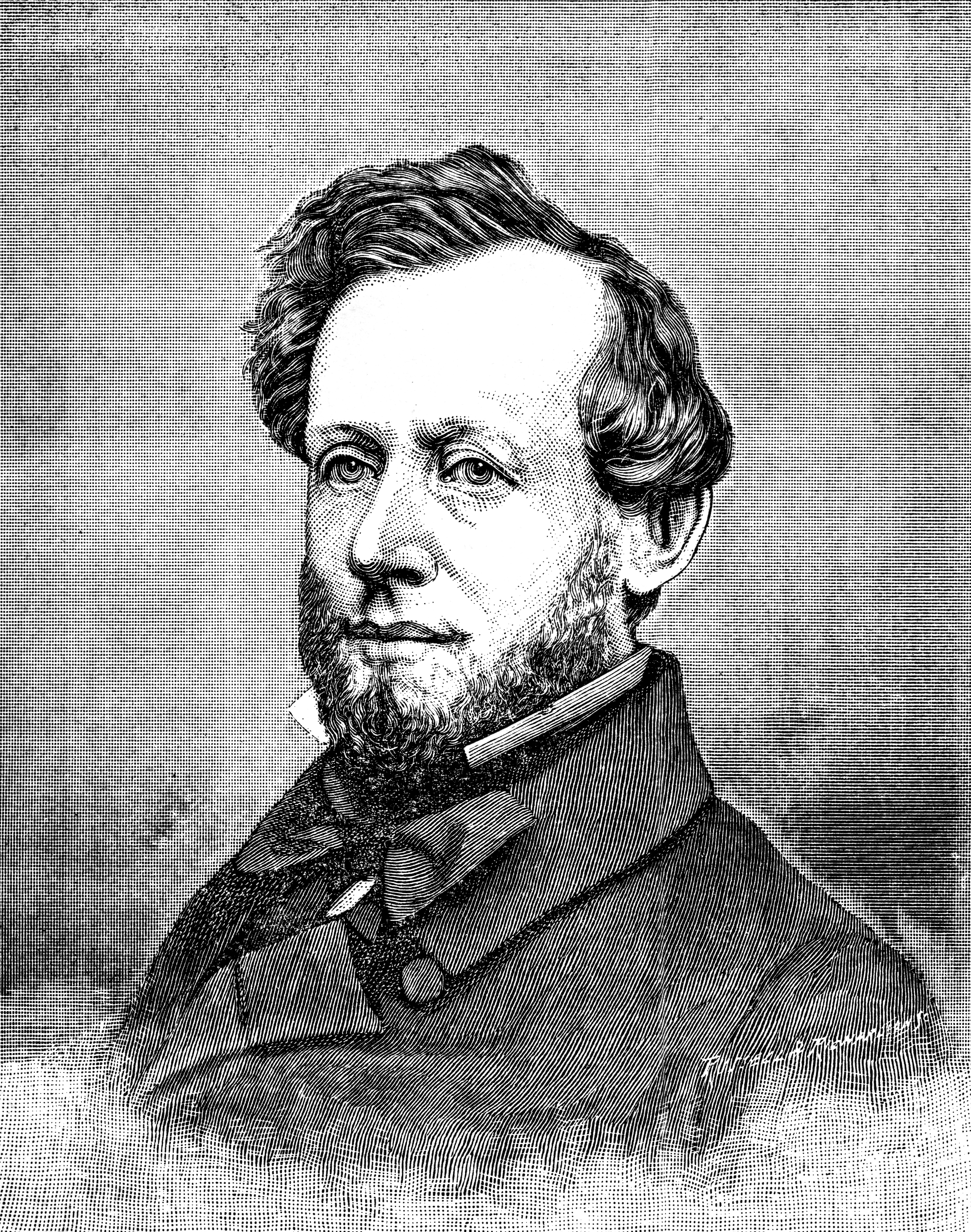
- Engraving

7th Mayor of Providence, Rhode Island
- In office June 1857 – June 1859
- Preceded by: James Y. Smith
- Succeeded by: Jabez C. Knight

Personal details
- Born: June 19, 1814 Newport, Rhode Island, US
- Died: December 11, 1868 (aged 54) Providence, Rhode Island, US
- Resting place: Swan Point Cemetery
- Party: Republican-American
- Occupation: Tailoring, Insurance

William Mitchell Rodman (June 19, 1814 – December 11, 1868) was a tailor and 7th mayor of Providence, Rhode Island from 1857 to 1859.

== Early life ==
Rodman was born June 19, 1814, in Newport, Rhode Island. Young William attended the school taught by his father, a Quaker school-master. At age 16, he moved to Providence to become a tailor's apprentice with the firm E.C. & T. Wells.

== Career ==
Wells were the leading tailors of Providence. Starting from about 1850, Rodman teamed with Sullivan Moulton to form the tailoring firm of Moulton and Rodman, located first in the Arcade, then at 27 Westminster Street. Their customers included some of the most prominent people of Providence.

Rodman was a member of the school committee and City Council before being elected to two consecutive terms as mayor from 1857 to 1859. After his political career, Rodman went into the insurance business.

Rodman died at his home in Providence on December 11, 1868 and was buried at Swan Point Cemetery.

Political offices
Preceded by James Y. Smith	Mayor of Providence; 1857-1859	Succeeded by Jabez C. Knight
