= James Y. Smith =

American politician

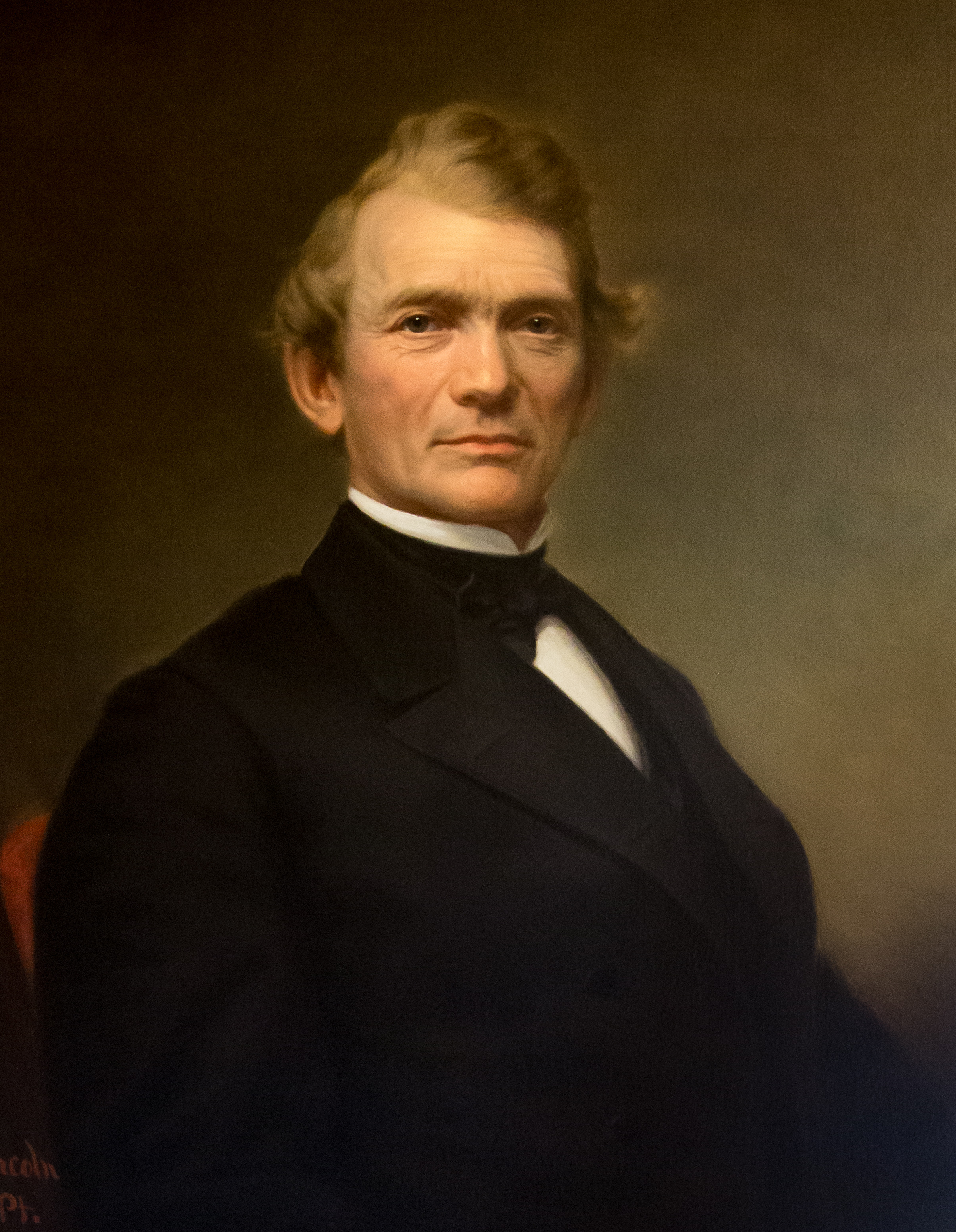
- Official Rhode Island State House portrait by James Sullivan Lincoln

29th Governor of Rhode Island
- In office May 26, 1863 – May 29, 1866
- Lieutenant: Seth Padelford
- Preceded by: William C. Cozzens
- Succeeded by: Ambrose Burnside

6th Mayor of Providence, Rhode Island
- In office June 1855 – June 1857
- Preceded by: Edward P. Knowles
- Succeeded by: William M. Rodman

Personal details
- Born: James Youngs Smith; September 15, 1809 Groton, Connecticut, US
- Died: March 26, 1876 (aged 66) Providence, Rhode Island, US
- Resting place: Swan Point Cemetery
- Party: Republican
- Spouse: Emily Brown
- Profession: Businessman

James Youngs Smith (September 15, 1809 – March 26, 1876) was an American politician and the 29th governor of Rhode Island (May 26, 1863 – May 29, 1866).

== Early life ==
Smith was born in Poquonock Village in Groton, Connecticut, to Amos D. Smith and Priscilla (Mitchell) Smith. His mother was descended from Mayflower passengers John Alden and Priscilla Mullens.

Smith was a store manager in Salem, Connecticut, at the age of sixteen. Next year, he moved to Providence, Rhode Island, where he worked for a lumber business that he became the owner of a decade later. He sold this business to start a manufacturing business with his brother Amos D. Smith, and with their A.D. & J.Y. Smith Mills they became the leading textile investors in the state. James Y. Smith. They owned mills in both Connecticut and Rhode Island.

On August 13, 1835, he married Emily Brown, daughter of Thomas Brown, a cotton manufacturer in Scituate. Smith then branched out from lumber to investing in cotton mills. They had two daughters Isabella who married Charles A. Nichols, Emily who married General Horatio Rogers and one son Thomas who had died very young.

== Political career ==
Smith was active in politics as a Republican. He was Mayor of Providence for two one-year terms from 1855 to 1857. He was a member of the House of Representatives of Rhode Island. He ran unsuccessfully for governor in 1861, but won in the election two years later. He succeeded William C. Cozzens on May 26, 1863. He was reelected two times, then declined to run again. He was succeeded by fellow Republican and Civil war general Ambrose Burnside on May 29, 1866.

== Later years ==
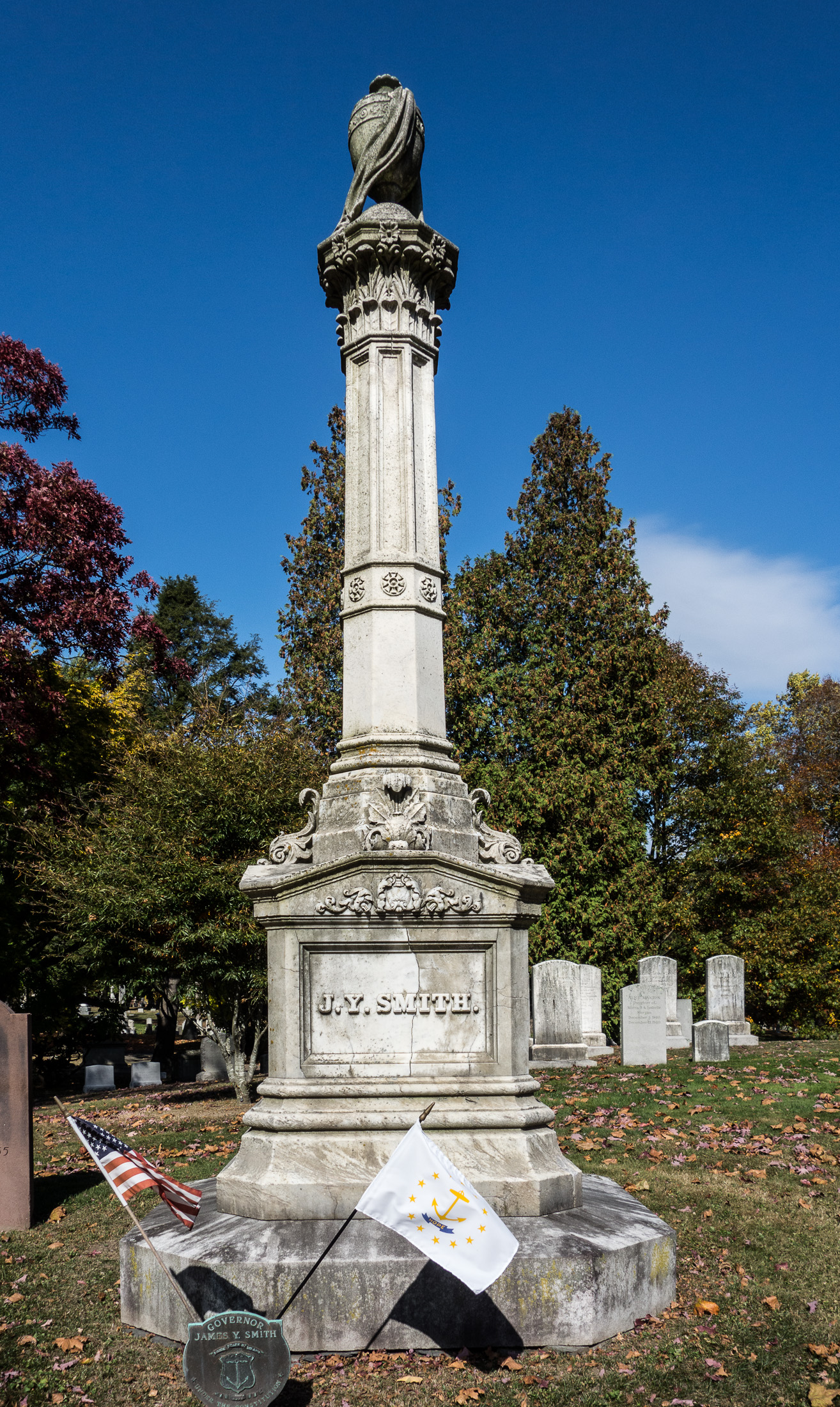
Smith's memorial in Swan Point Cemetery

After leaving office, Smith founded the James Y. Smith Manufacturing Company. He continued as a manufacturer until his death in 1876. He was also involved in various enterprises; then was president of the Providence Board of Trade; director of the Providence and Worcester Railway Company; and a member of five commissions in the city government. He was chairman of the commission to build the new Providence City Hall. He was also a member of the Standing Committee of Central Congregational Church in Providence.

His death occasioned great public mourning in Providence. Public offices were closed, and a funeral procession of mourners in carriages and on foot followed the body to its resting place in Swan Point Cemetery.

== Sources ==
- Sobel, Robert and John Raimo. Biographical Directory of the Governors of the United States, 1789-1978. Greenwood Press, 1988. ISBN 0-313-28093-2

Party political offices
Preceded by Seth Padelford	Republican nominee for Governor of Rhode Island; 1861	Vacant Title next held by Himself
Vacant Title last held by Himself	Republican nominee for Governor of Rhode Island; 1863, 1864, 1865	Succeeded by Ambrose Burnside
Political offices
Preceded by Edward P. Knowles	Mayor of Providence; 1855-1857	Succeeded by William M. Rodman
Preceded by William C. Cozzens	Governor of Rhode Island; 1863–1866	Succeeded by Ambrose Burnside
