= Charles R. Brayton =

American politician

Charles Ray Brayton
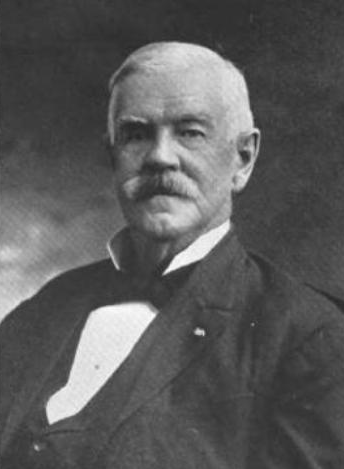
- Born: August 16, 1840; Warwick, Rhode Island
- Died: September 23, 1910 (aged 70); Providence, Rhode Island
- Resting place: Swan Point Cemetery
- Occupations: Politician, lobbyist
- Political party: Republican
- Spouse: Antoinette Percival Belden (m. 1865)

Charles Ray Brayton (August 16, 1840 – September 23, 1910) was an American politician and lobbyist. A Republican, The New York Times called him the "Blind Boss of Rhode Island" and drew parallels with the New York City's disgraced political boss William "Boss" Tweed.

== Biography ==
Charles R. Brayton was born in Warwick, Rhode Island to William Daniel Brayton and Anna Maud (Clarke) Brayton. In 1857, his father was elected as a Republican representing Rhode Island in the U.S. Congress. In 1859, he began attending Brown University in Providence, but left in the middle of his second year to join the 3rd Rhode Island Heavy Artillery in the Union Army of the American Civil War. He was commissioned as first lieutenant in 1861, promoted to lieutenant colonel in 1863, and to colonel in April 1864. He was honorably mustered out of service in October 1864. In March 1865, along with many others, he received a brevet (honorary promotion) to the rank of brigadier general. That same year, just a month before the end of the war, he married Antoinette Percival Belden.

=== Political rise ===
Brayton was commissioned a captain in the 17th Infantry Regiment of the Regular Army in March 1867 and resigned in July of the same year. He was then appointed postmaster of Port Royal, South Carolina, a city that he had helped to capture during the war. He served in a number of political appointments before returning to Warwick to fill the office of Township Clerk, a position that had also been held by his father. In 1870 he declined an appointment by President Ulysses S. Grant as Consul to County Cork in Ireland. In 1874, he became Postmaster of Providence, and in 1880 he was named Chief of the Rhode Island State Police.

Brayton became chairman of the Republican State Committee, a position that he used to become the effective "boss" of the state's Republican-controlled political system for almost thirty years to follow. In 1896, he was named to the Republican National Committee. He served as a delegate to the 1900 Republican National Convention, which nominated incumbent President William McKinley.

=== Loss of sight ===
In 1900, Brayton developed cataracts in both eyes, and in 1901 underwent an unsuccessful operation that resulted in one of his eyes being removed. As the cataracts progressed, he became functionally blind in his remaining eye.

=== Brayton Act ===
In 1901, faced with a split in the state Republican Party after the death in office of Republican Governor William Gregory, Brayton urged the passage of a law shifting power from the office of Governor to the securely-Republican State Senate. The law, which became known as the Brayton Act, granted almost all appointment powers to the State Senate and limited the Governor to naming his own private secretary and a small handful of minor official positions. The legislation served its purpose when Democrat Lucius F. C. Garvin was elected Governor in 1903. The law remained in effect until the "Bloodless Revolution" of 1935, when the Democrats took control of the State Senate.

=== Lobbying controversy ===
Brayton became an issue in the 1906 gubernatorial election when the Democratic candidate, James H. Higgins, made public discontent with Brayton's influence the centerpiece of his campaign. According to Higgins, "the evils of lobbying" had become "an exclusive and oppressive monopoly" in Brayton's hands. Higgins won the election, and his criticisms were echoed by The New York Times, which referred to Brayton as "Rhode Island's Despot" and said that "for forty years Brayton's control over the General Assembly, and consequently over all legislation, has been practically absolute."

Brayton operated out of the Rhode Island State House office of High Sheriff of Providence County, Hunter C. White. In 1907, one of Governor Higgins' first acts in office was to order White to expel Brayton, whom he described as a "moral and political pest" in the pay of the New York, New Haven and Hartford Railroad, the Providence Telephone Company, the Rhode Island Company, and other special interests. White refused, saying that the matter was outside of the purview of the Governor's office and accusing the Governor of "insolence" and political opportunism.

Defending himself against charges of improper conduct on behalf oh his clients, Brayton said, "I have been the scapegoat of my party. People have said all sorts of things about me, most of them lies. I am not as bad as I have been painted, but I do not care much what people say. What I have done has been for the benefit of the Republican Party, and every time I have taken a retainer from any corporation I have always stipulated that I would drop the case if it turned out to be against the interest of my party."

=== Retirement and death ===
Brayton failed to install Samuel P. Colt in the United States Senate; incumbent Republican George P. Wetmore ultimately held his seat against fellow Republican Colt and Democrat Robert Hale Ives Goddard, although the protracted struggle left an empty seat in Rhode Island's delegation to the 60th Congress from March 1907 to January 1908.

In July 1907, Brayton resigned from the executive committee of the State Central Committee of the Republican Party. He vacated White's offices in the State House later in the year, stating that he had lingered to defy Governor Higgin's demands.

General Brayton was a member of the Military Order of the Loyal Legion of the United States and the Society of Colonial Wars. He was also highly active in the Grand Army of the Republic.

Brayton died in Providence on September 23, 1910, from diabetes and complications of a broken hip sustained in a fall. He is buried in Swan Point Cemetery in Providence.

== See also ==
- Mark Hanna
