= George H. Browne =

American politician

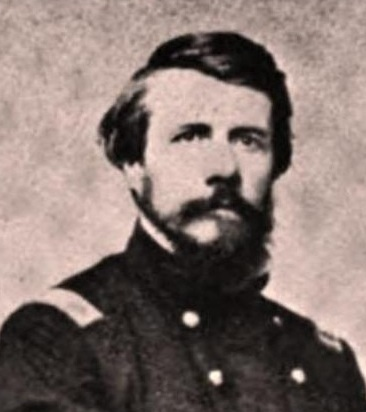

Member of the U.S. House of Representatives from Rhode Island's 2nd district
- In office March 4, 1861 – March 4, 1863
- Preceded by: William Daniel Brayton
- Succeeded by: Nathan F. Dixon II

Personal details
- Born: January 6, 1818 Glocester, Rhode Island
- Died: September 26, 1885 (aged 67) Providence, Rhode Island
- Resting place: Swan Point Cemetery
- Party: Democratic
- Other political affiliations: Constitutional Union (1861–63)

Military service
- Allegiance: (United States) United States; Union
- Branch/service: United States Army; Union Army
- Years of service: 1862–65
- Rank: Colonel (United States)
- Unit: 12th Rhode Island Infantry
- Battles/wars: American Civil War

George Huntington Browne (January 6, 1818 – September 26, 1885) was a U.S. representative from Rhode Island.

Born in Glocester, Rhode Island, Browne attended the public schools. He graduated from Brown University in 1840, where he studied law. He was admitted to the bar in 1843 and commenced practice in Providence, Rhode Island.

During the Dorr Rebellion, in 1842, Browne was elected to both the Charter and the Suffrage legislatures. He accepted the latter seat, aligning himself with the supporters of the People's Constitution. Following the end of the crisis, he served as member of the Rhode Island General Assembly under the 1842 Constitution from 1849 to 1852.

Browne was appointed a U.S. district attorney in 1852 and served until 1861, when he resigned. He was a delegate to the 1860 Democratic National Conventions which resulted in the splintering of the party between supporters of Stephen Douglas and John C. Breckinridge. Following the election of the Republican candidate, Abraham Lincoln, he attended the Peace Conference of 1861, held in Washington, D.C. in an effort to prevent the impending civil war.

Browne declined the appointment as governor of the Arizona Territory in 1861. He was elected as a candidate of the Constitutional Union Party to the 37th United States Congress, serving from 1861 to 1863. He was an unsuccessful candidate for reelection in 1863. He entered the Union Army as colonel of the 12th Rhode Island Infantry Regiment on October 13, 1862 and served throughout the American Civil War.

Following the end of the war, Browne served as member of the Rhode Island Senate in 1872 and 1873. He was elected chief justice of the Rhode Island Supreme Court in 1874, but declined the office. He died in Providence, Rhode Island, September 26, 1885 and was interred in Swan Point Cemetery.

== Sources ==
- United States Congress. "George H. Browne (id: B000956)". Biographical Directory of the United States Congress.

Party political offices
Preceded by William C. Cozzens	Democratic nominee for Governor of Rhode Island; 1864, 1865	Succeeded by Lymon Pierce
U.S. House of Representatives
Preceded by William Daniel Brayton	Member of the U.S. House of Representatives from Rhode Island's 2nd congressional district 1861–1863	Succeeded by Nathan F. Dixon II
Legal offices
Preceded by James M. Clark	United States Attorney for the District of Rhode Island; 1853 – 1861	Succeeded by Wingate Hayes
