= George A. Brayton =

American judge (1803–1880)

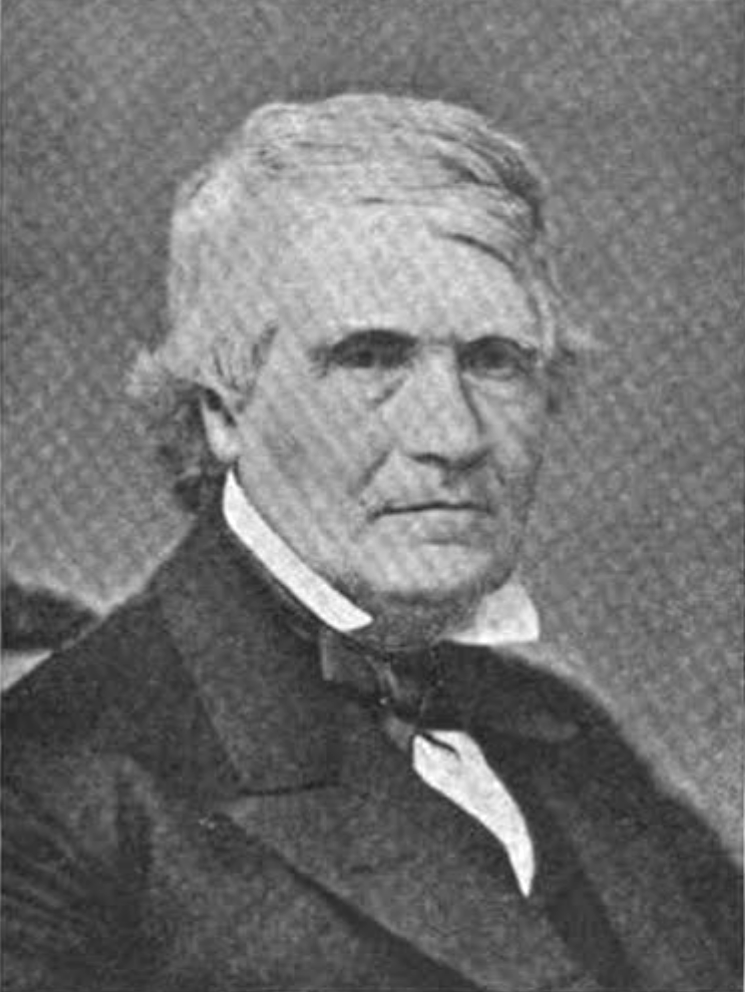
Rhode Island Supreme Court Justice George A. Brayton, from The Green Bag (1890).

George A. Brayton (1803 – April 21, 1880) was a justice of the Rhode Island Supreme Court from 1843 to 1874, serving as chief justice from 1868 to 1874.

Born in Warwick, Rhode Island, Brayton graduated from Brown University in 1824, and studied law in the office of Albert C. Greene, afterwards Attorney-General of the State and United States Senator, and at the Litchfield Law School. In 1832, and again in 1843, Brayton served in the Rhode Island General Assembly. He was a member of the Constitutional Convention in 1842.

In June 1843 Brayton was elected an associate justice of the Rhode Island Supreme Court, and on March 13, 1868, after nearly twenty-five years of service, became chief justice. Brayton resigned on May 28, 1874, after the longest term of judicial service in the history of the State.

Brayton lived for a time at the historic Gen. James Mitchell Varnum House in East Greenwich, Rhode Island.

Political offices
| Preceded by Newly constituted court | Associate Justice of the Rhode Island Supreme Court; 1843–1868 | Succeeded by Walter S. Burgess |
| Preceded by Charles S. Bradley | Chief Justice of the Rhode Island Supreme Court; 1868–1874 | Succeeded by Thomas Durfee |
