= 1863 Rhode Island gubernatorial election =

- April 2, 1863
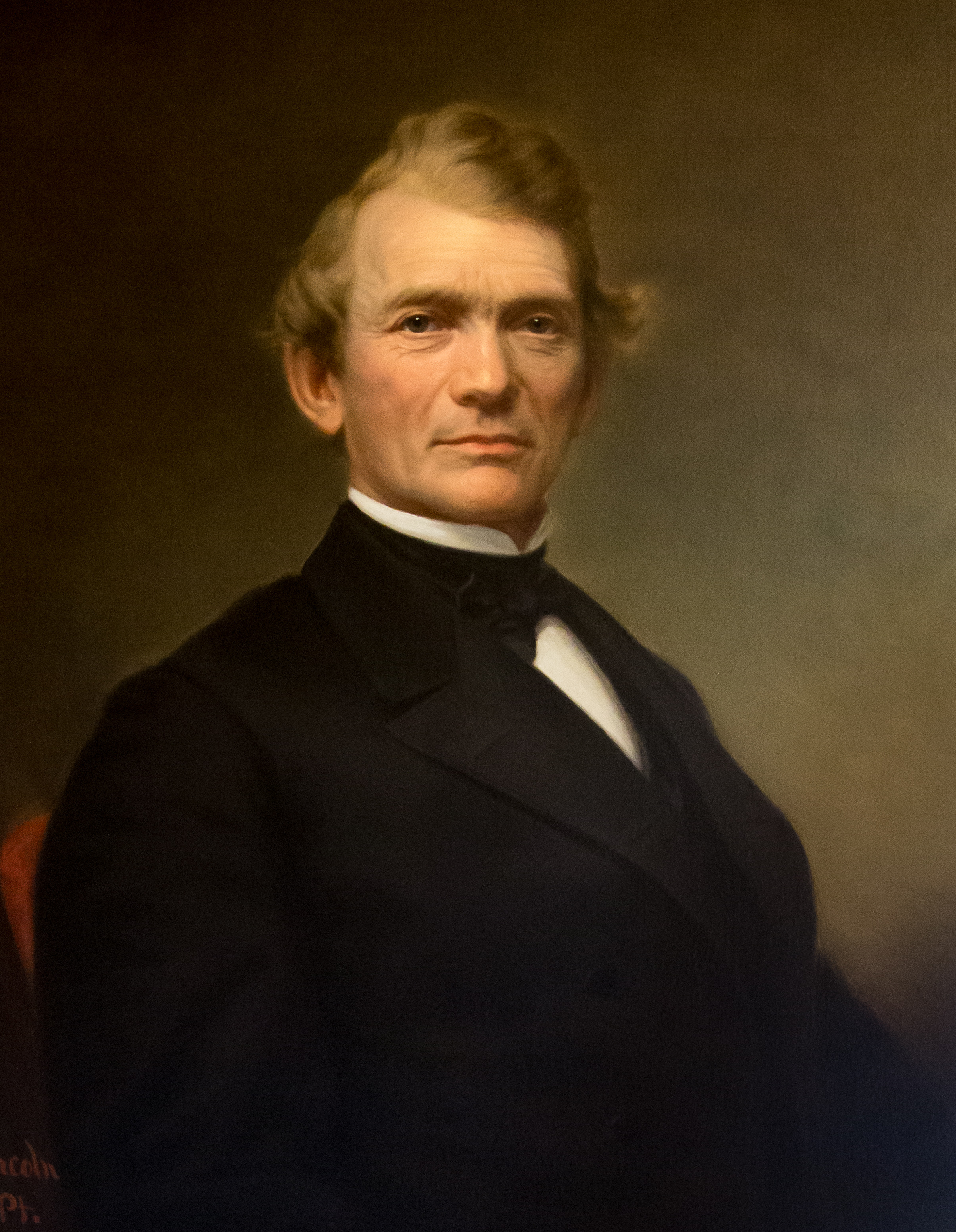

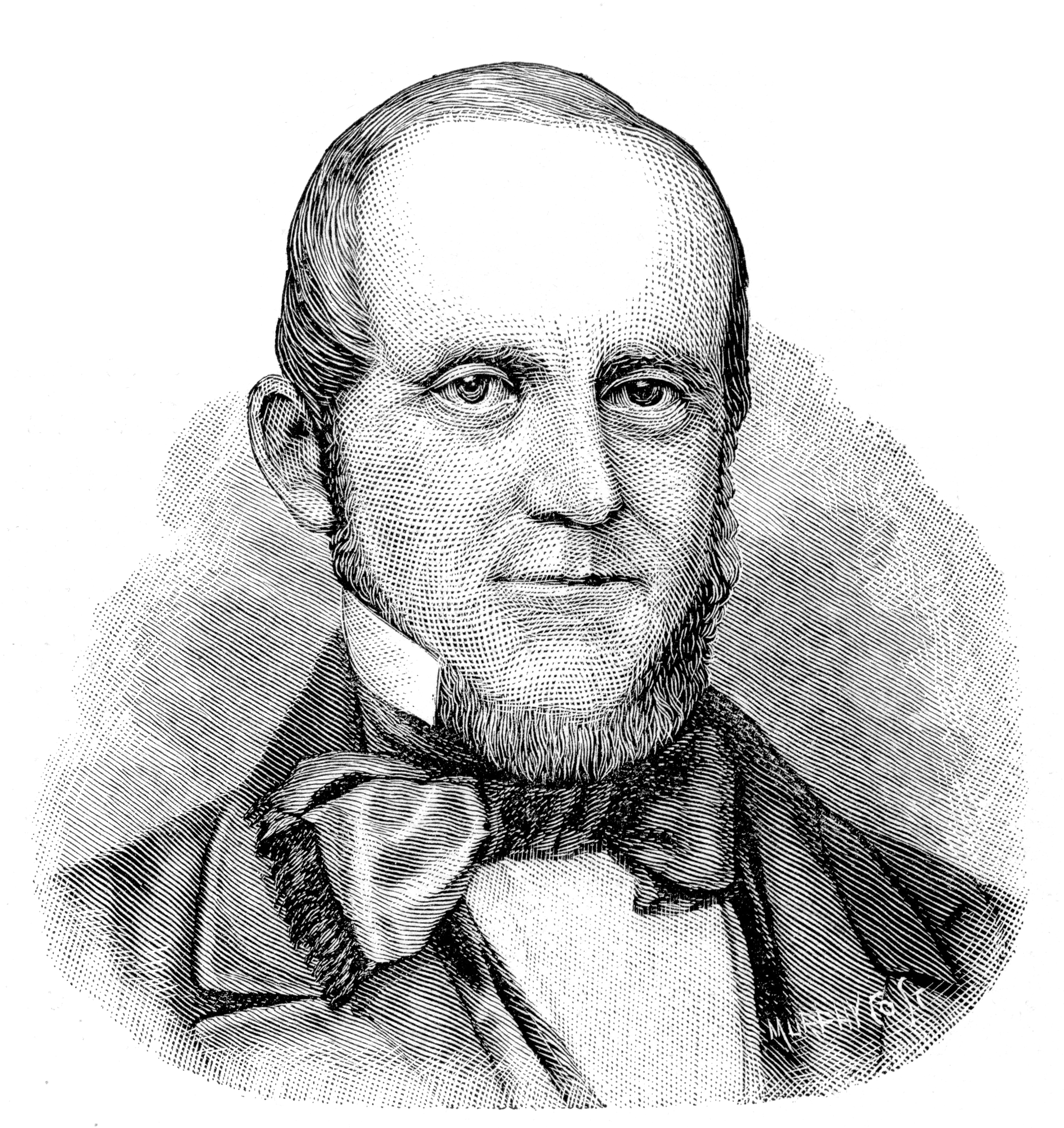
| Nominee | James Y. Smith | William C. Cozzens |
| Party | Republican | Democratic |
| Alliance | | Constitutional Union |
| Popular vote | 10,749 | 7,672 |
| Percentage | 58.35% | 41.65% |
- County results Smith: 50–60% 60–70%
Governor before election
William C. Cozzens
Democratic
Elected Governor
James Y. Smith
Republican

A gubernatorial election was held in Rhode Island on April 2, 1863. The Republican former mayor of Providence James Y. Smith defeated the Democratic incumbent governor William C. Cozzens.

William Sprague IV won the 1860 Rhode Island gubernatorial election leading a coalition of Conservative Republicans, former Whigs, and Democrats. Following the election, Sprague's supporters coalesced in the Constitutional Union Party. Sprague underwent a political transformation during his tenure as governor, which coincided with the American Civil War. He attempted to build a new political party composed of Republicans, War Democrats, and his old conservative allies. When this effort failed, Sprague threw his support behind the Republicans. Following his election to the United States Senate, he used his influence to encourage conservatives to back Smith, whom Sprague had defeated in his 1861 re-election bid. Cozzens ran jointly as the Democratic and Constitutional Union candidate on a platform that endorsed the war effort and condemned emancipation.

== General election ==
1863 Rhode Island gubernatorial election
| Party | Candidate | Votes | % |
|---|---|---|---|
| Republican | James Y. Smith | 10,749 | 58.35 |
| Democratic | William C. Cozzens (incumbent) | 7,672 | 41.65 |
| Total votes | | 18,421 | 100.00 |
| Republican gain from Democratic | | | |

== Bibliography ==
- Dell, Christopher (1975). Lincoln and the War Democrats: The Grand Erosion of Conservative Tradition. Rutherford, NJ: Farleigh Dickenson University Press.
- DeSimone, Russel J.; Schofield, Daniel C. (October 2015), Rhode Island Election Tickets: A Survey (PDF), Kingston, RI: University of Rhode Island
- Dubin, Michael J. (2014). United States Gubernatorial Elections, 1861–1911: The Official Results by State and County. Jefferson, NC: McFarland and Company. ISBN 978-0-7864-5646-8.
- Smith, Adam I. P. (2006). No Party Now: Politics in the Civil War North. New York: Oxford University Press. ISBN 978-0-19-534596-4.
- Smith, Adam I. P. (2017). The Stormy Present: Conservatism and the Problem of Slavery in Northern Politics, 1846–1865. Chapel Hill: University of North Carolina Press. ISBN 978-1-4696-3389-3.
