= 1862 Rhode Island gubernatorial election =

- April 2, 1862
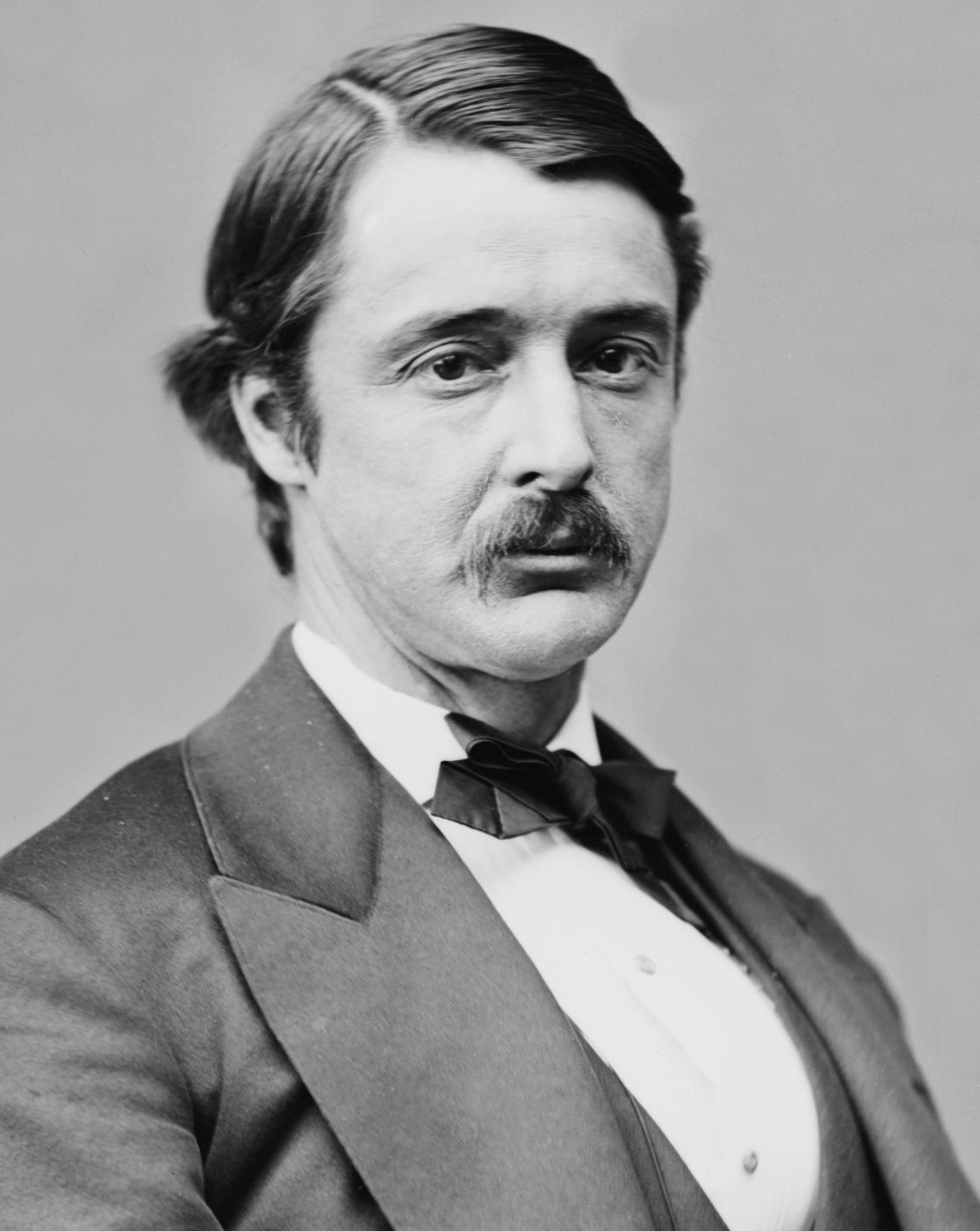
Nominee	William Sprague IV
Party	Constitutional Union
Popular vote	11,199
Percentage	100.00%
- County results Sprague: >90%
Governor before election
William Sprague IV
Constitutional Union
Elected Governor
William Sprague IV
Constitutional Union

A gubernatorial election was held in Rhode Island on April 2, 1862. The incumbent Constitutional Union governor William Sprague IV was re-elected without opposition.

Sprague won the 1860 election leading a coalition of Conservative Republicans, former Whigs, and Democrats that formed to oppose the Radical Republican gubernatorial candidate, Seth Padelford. Following the election, his supporters coalesced in the Constitutional Union Party. So great was Sprague's popularity that the Republican Party did not attempt to contest the election.

== General election ==
1862 Rhode Island gubernatorial election
Party	Candidate	Votes	%
Constitutional Union	William Sprague IV (incumbent)	11,199	100.00
Total votes		11,199	100.00
Constitutional Union hold			

== Bibliography ==
- Dubin, Michael J. (2014). United States Gubernatorial Elections, 1861–1911: The Official Results by State and County. Jefferson, NC: McFarland and Company. ISBN 978-0-7864-5646-8.
- Smith, Adam I. P. (2006). No Party Now: Politics in the Civil War North. New York: Oxford University Press. ISBN 978-0-19-534596-4.
- Smith, Adam I. P. (2017). The Stormy Present: Conservatism and the Problem of Slavery in Northern Politics, 1846–1865. Chapel Hill: University of North Carolina Press. ISBN 978-1-4696-3389-3.
