= 1861 Rhode Island gubernatorial election =

- April 3, 1861
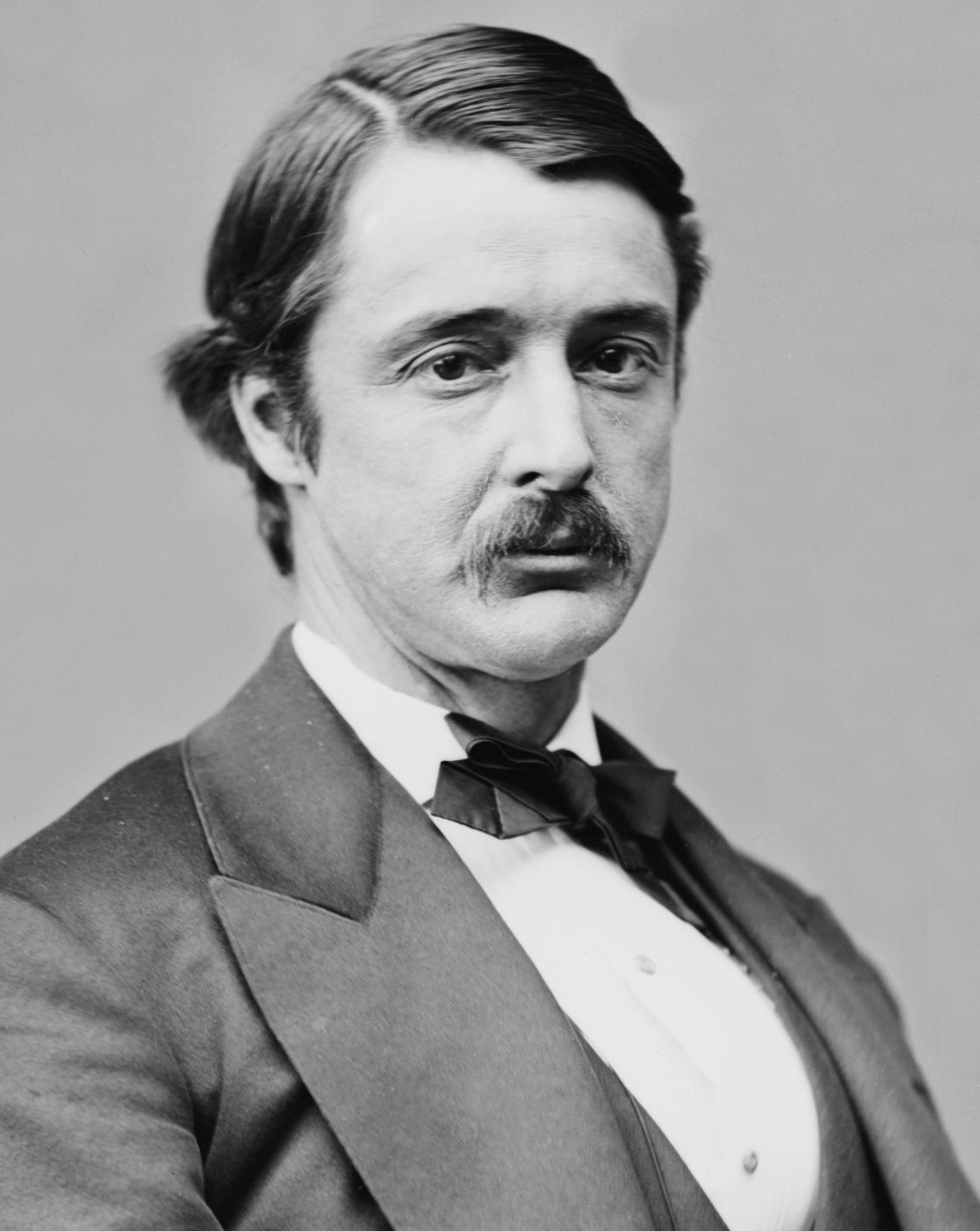

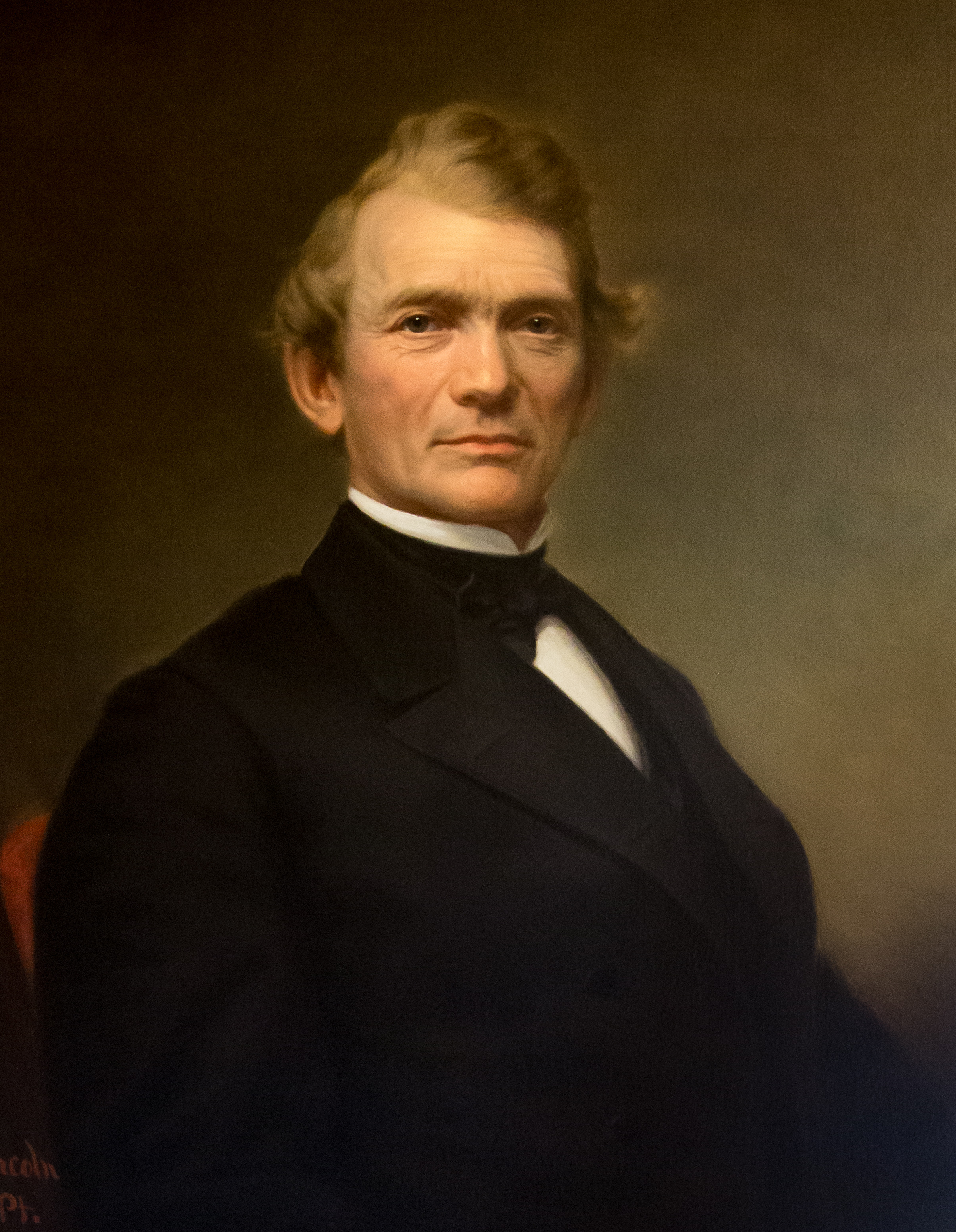
Nominee	William Sprague IV	James Y. Smith
Party	Constitutional Union	Republican
Popular vote	12,005	10,326
Percentage	53.76%	46.25%
- County results Sprague: 50–60% Smith: 50–60%
Governor before election
William Sprague IV
Democratic
Elected Governor
William Sprague IV
Constitutional Union

A gubernatorial election was held in Rhode Island on April 3, 1861. The incumbent Constitutional Union governor William Sprague IV defeated the Republican mayor of Providence James Y. Smith.

Sprague won the 1860 election leading a coalition of Conservative Republicans, former Whigs, and Democrats that formed to oppose the Radical Republican gubernatorial candidate, Seth Padelford. Following the election, his supporters coalesced in the Constitutional Union Party. In concurrent elections for the United States House of Representatives, the Constitutional Union candidates defeated the Republican candidates in both Rhode Island congressional districts.

== General election ==
1861 Rhode Island gubernatorial election
Party	Candidate	Votes	%
Constitutional Union	William Sprague IV (incumbent)	12,005	53.76
Republican	James Y. Smith	10,326	46.25
Total votes		22,331	100.00
Constitutional Union hold			

== Bibliography ==
- Dubin, Michael J. (2014). United States Gubernatorial Elections, 1861–1911: The Official Results by State and County. Jefferson, NC: McFarland and Company. ISBN 978-0-7864-5646-8.
- McLoughlin, William G. (1986). Rhode Island: A History. New York: W. W. Norton & Company.
- Smith, Adam I. P. (2006). No Party Now: Politics in the Civil War North. New York: Oxford University Press. ISBN 978-0-19-534596-4.
- Smith, Adam I. P. (2017). The Stormy Present: Conservatism and the Problem of Slavery in Northern Politics, 1846–1865. Chapel Hill: University of North Carolina Press. ISBN 978-1-4696-3389-3.
