= James Sullivan Lincoln =

American painter

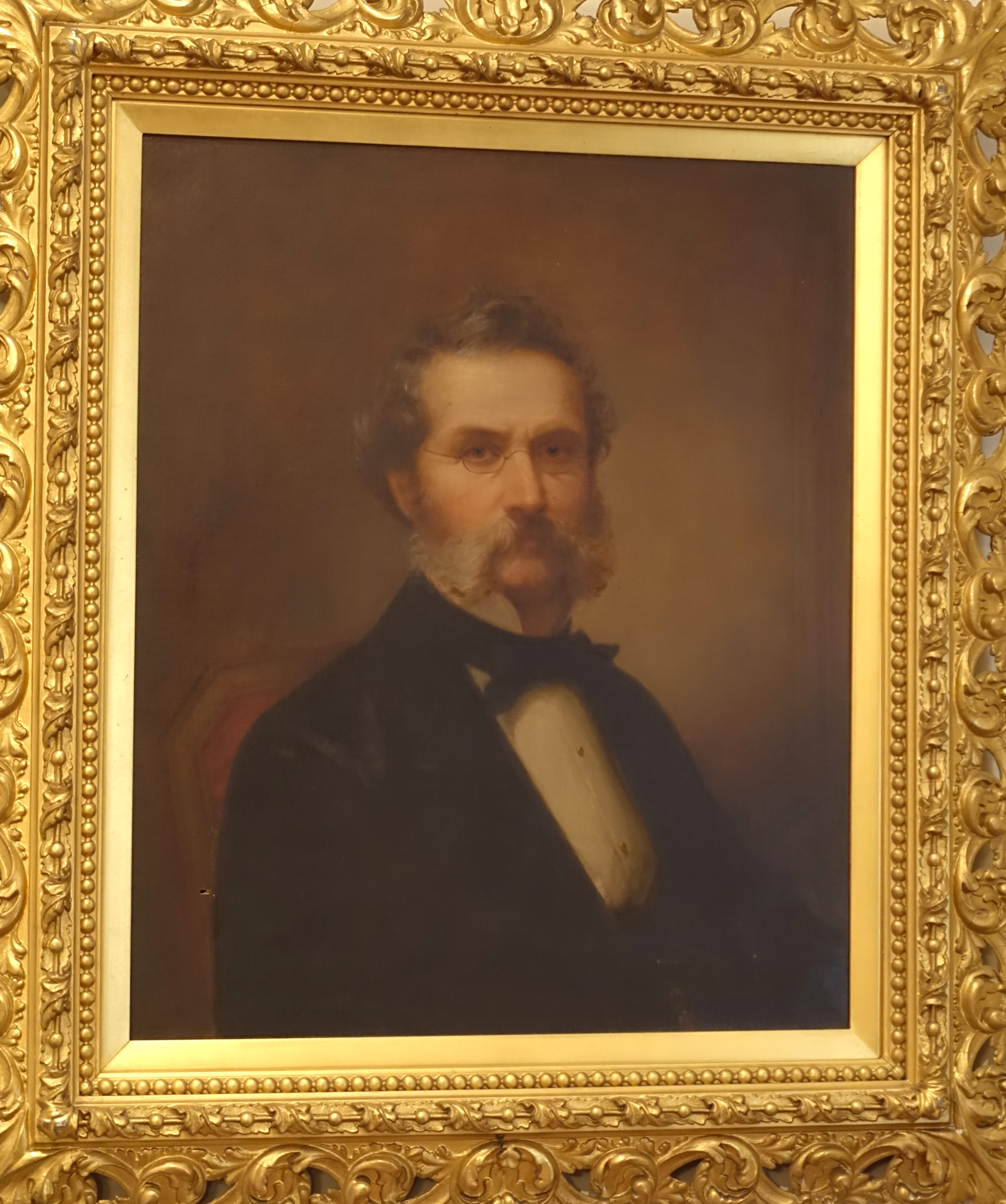
- Lincoln by John N. Arnold, 1906
- Born: May 13, 1811; Taunton, Massachusetts
- Died: January 18, 1888 (aged 76); Providence, Rhode Island
- Resting place: Swan Point Cemetery
- Known for: Portrait painting
- Spouse: Rosina Child Chase
- Elected: First president of Providence Art Club, 1880

James Sullivan Lincoln (May 13, 1811 – January 18, 1888) was an American portrait painter based in Providence, Rhode Island. He has been called the "father of Rhode Island art" and the "father of art in Providence". His works include eleven portraits of governors of Rhode Island, displayed at the State House, and six portraits of mayors which hang in the Providence City Hall.

== Early life ==
James Sullivan Lincoln was born in Taunton, Massachusetts, to Sullivan and Keziah (Weston) Lincoln. He was the oldest of six children. His father was a miller and farmer.

At age ten, the family moved to Providence, Rhode Island. Lincoln's father died when James was fourteen. Needing to earn money to support the family, James went to work for an engraving company in downtown Providence. Lincoln's job was to make the drawings for the engravings; his skill at drawing caught the attention of nearby artist C.T. Hinckley, who trained the boy in the art of painting. Within two years, James was able to copy famous paintings such as Gilbert Stuart's portrait of George Washington, which hung in the Rhode Island State House.

== Painting career ==
His painting career began in 1832.

One of Lincoln's earliest clients (when he was age 25) was wealthy Pawtucket industrialist Samuel Slater, who had been dissatisfied with an earlier portrait by another painter. Lincoln's portrait proved so popular that he made several copies, including one for Brown University (deaccessioned in 1980).

Lincoln's mentor Hinckley moved away from Providence, leaving the field open for his protege to open his own studio on South Main Street, in the heart of the city at Market Square. He ran this studio for sixty years, soon becoming the pre-eminent portrait painter in Rhode Island.

In 1880, Lincoln was elected first president of the Providence Art Club.

== Personal life ==
Lincoln married Rosina Child Chase, daughter of Darius and Elizabeth Chase. Rosina's parents moved from Providence to a farm in Barrington, Rhode Island shortly after the marriage, and for a time the young couple lived there with the Chases, with James commuting daily from Barrington to his Providence studio. In 1863 the Lincolns moved into the city of Providence.

He enjoyed traveling around the state of Rhode Island, to pursue his pastime of trout fishing. He had a great love of nature, which sometimes worked its way into the backgrounds of his paintings.

From about 1832 to 1856, Lincoln was a member of the Providence National Cadets, an "independent military organization". For two years he was a member of the Rhode Island Militia. He did not serve in the Civil War, but was active in training recruits during 1861 and 1862.

Lincoln died in 1888 and is buried at Swan Point Cemetery.

== Awards and honors ==
- In 2004, Lincoln was posthumously inducted into the Rhode Island Heritage Hall of Fame.

== Gallery ==
Lincoln painted eleven portraits of governors which hang in the Rhode Island State House, six portraits of mayors which hang in the Providence City Hall, plus numerous judges, lawyers, clergy, physicians, professors, industrialists, and others.

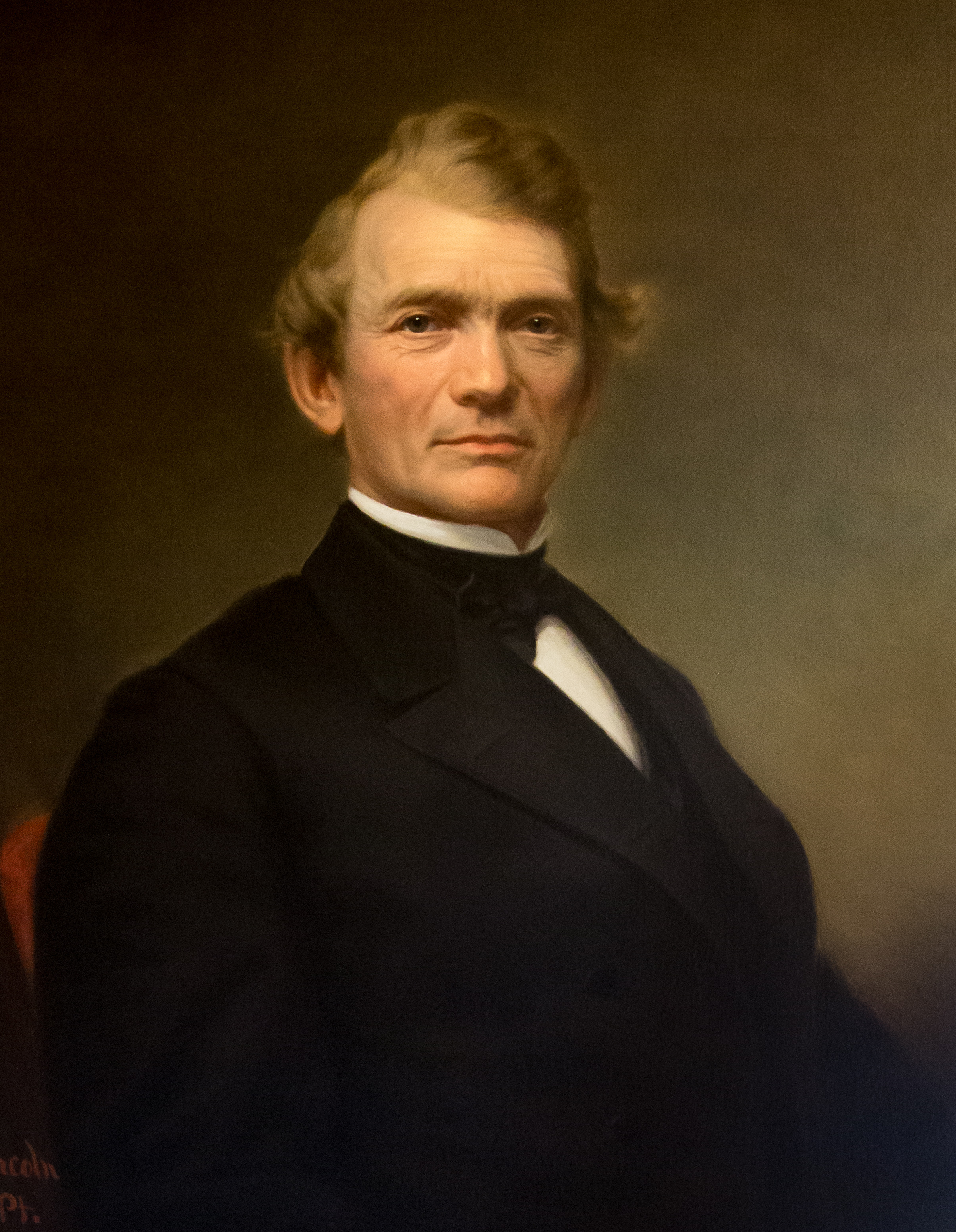
Governor James Y. Smith

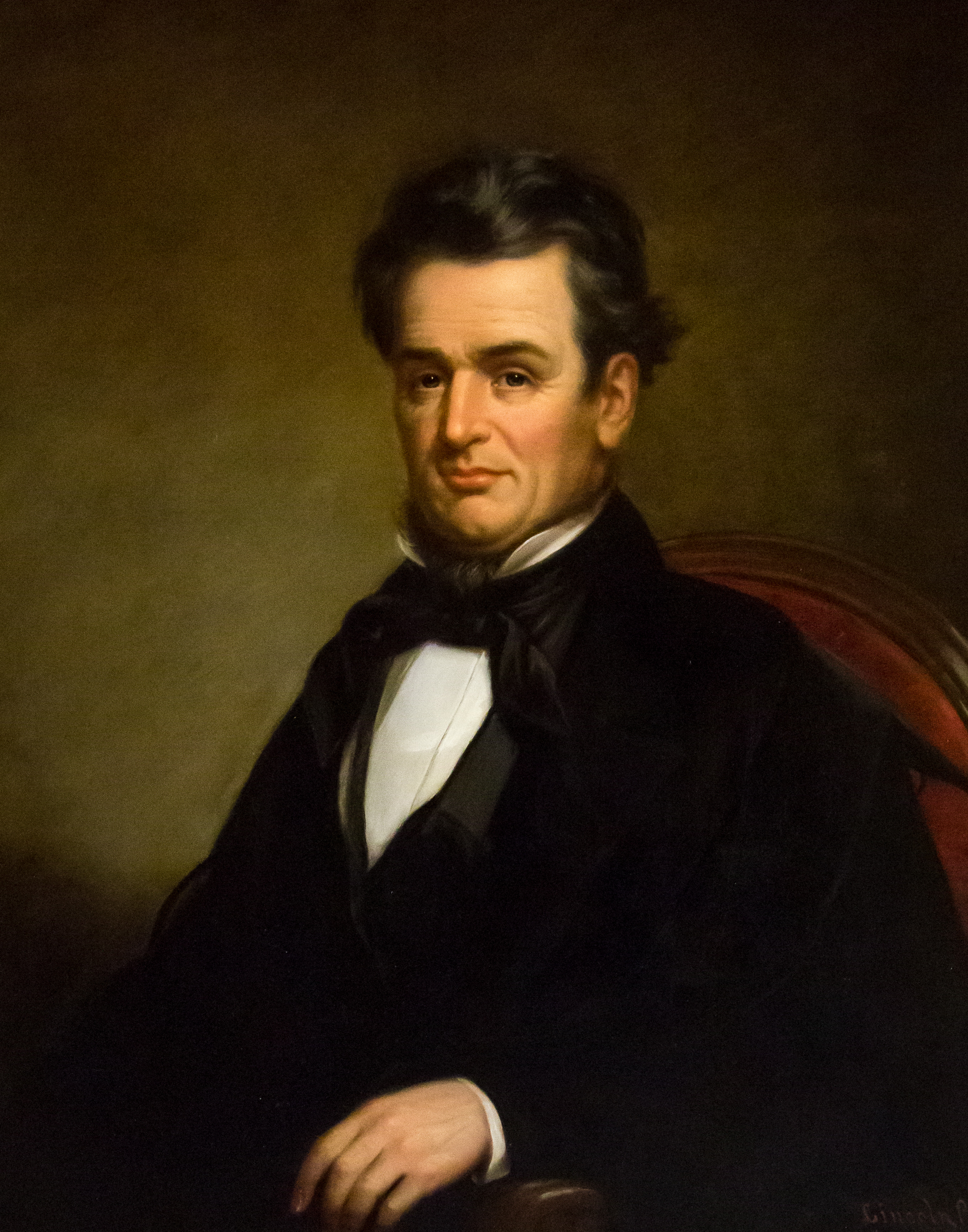
Governor Byron Diman

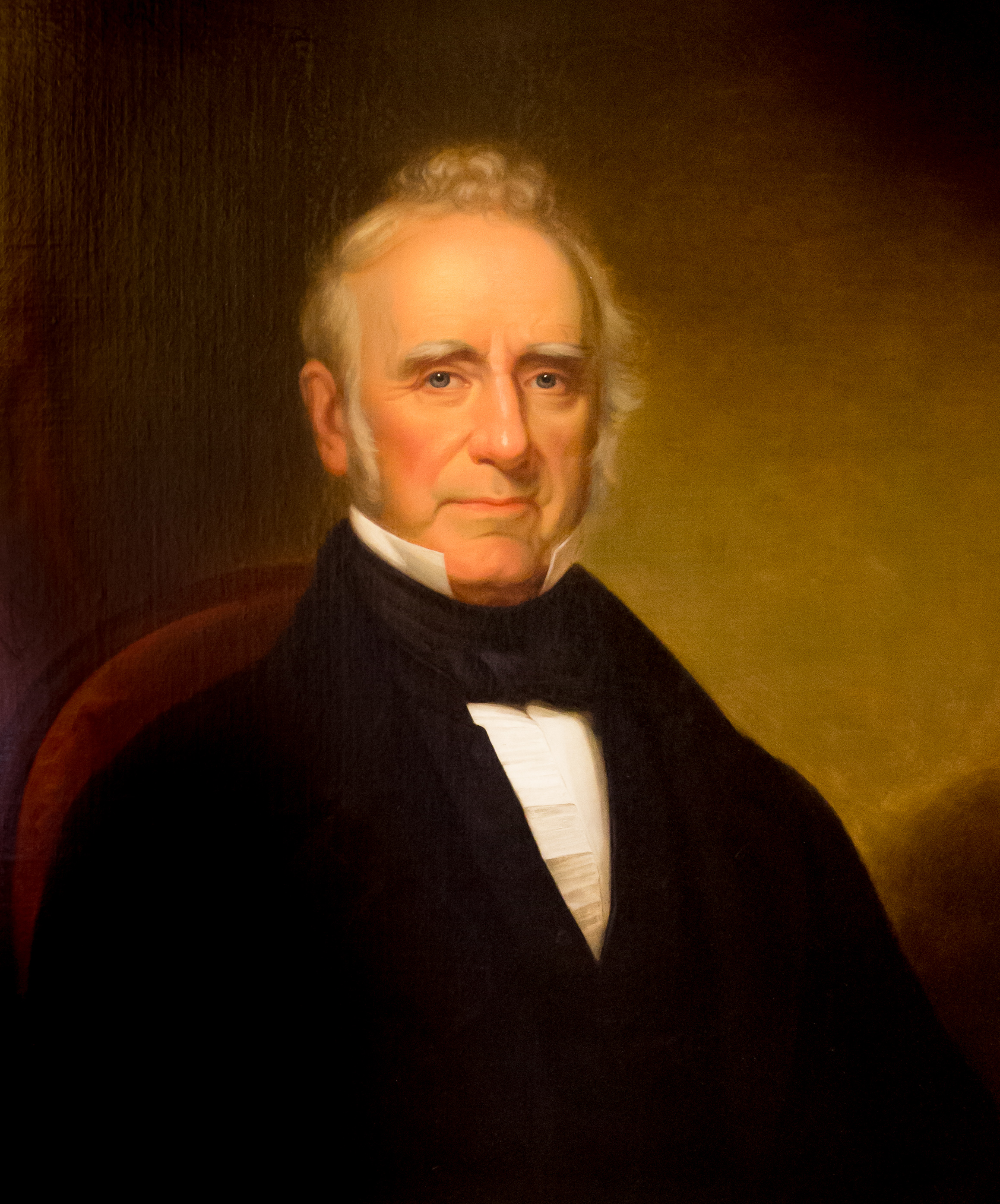
Governor Nehemiah R. Knight

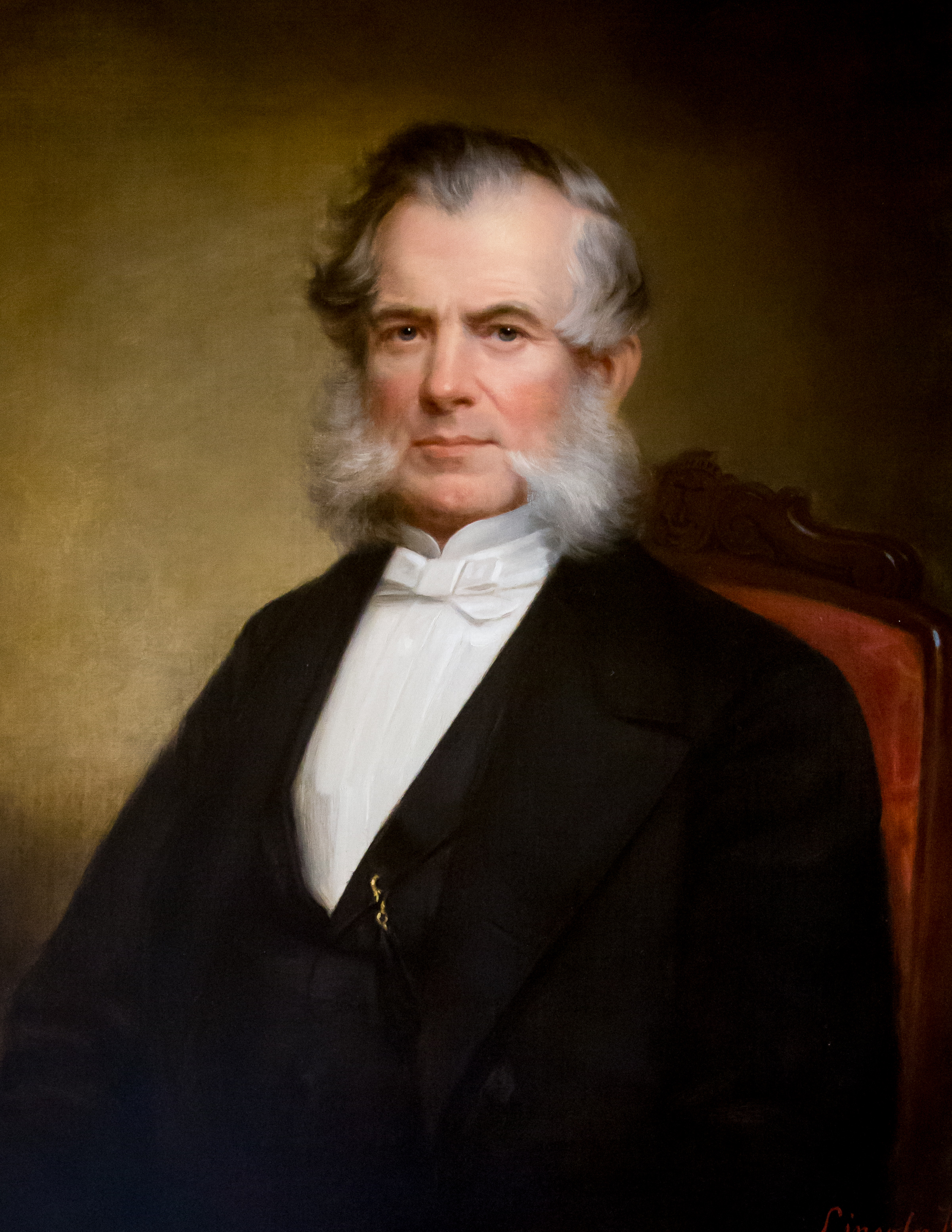
Governor Elisha Dyer

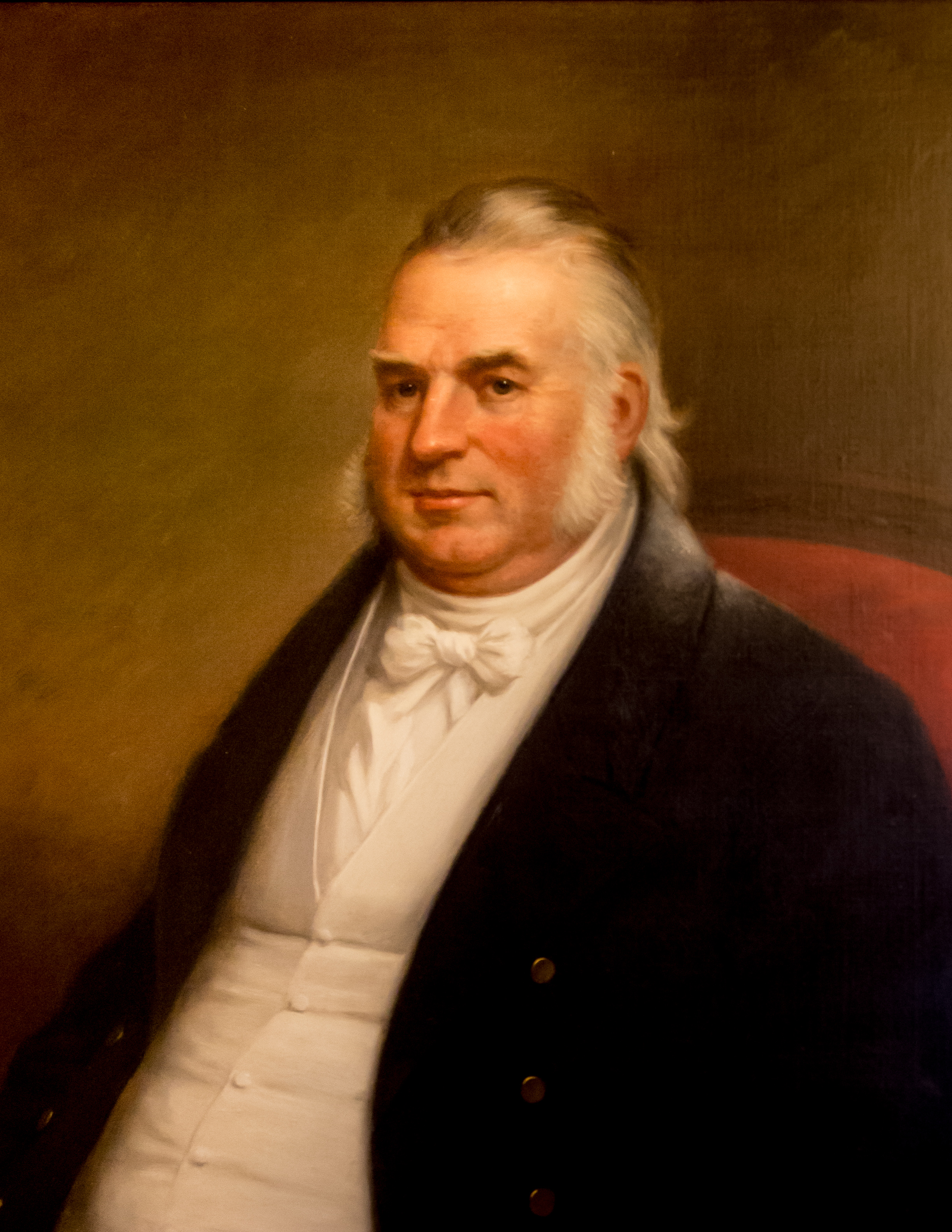
Governor James Fenner

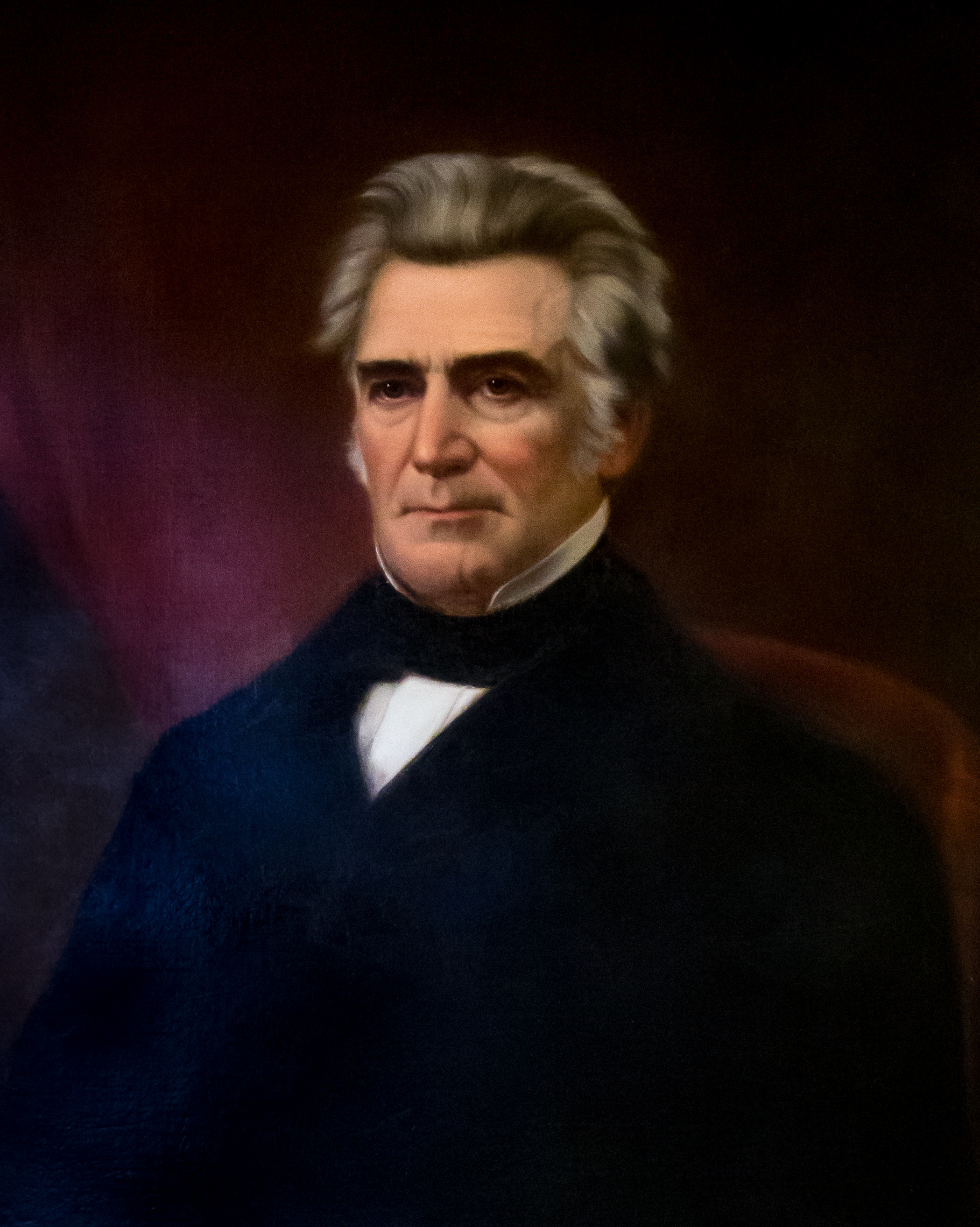
Governor Lemuel H. Arnold

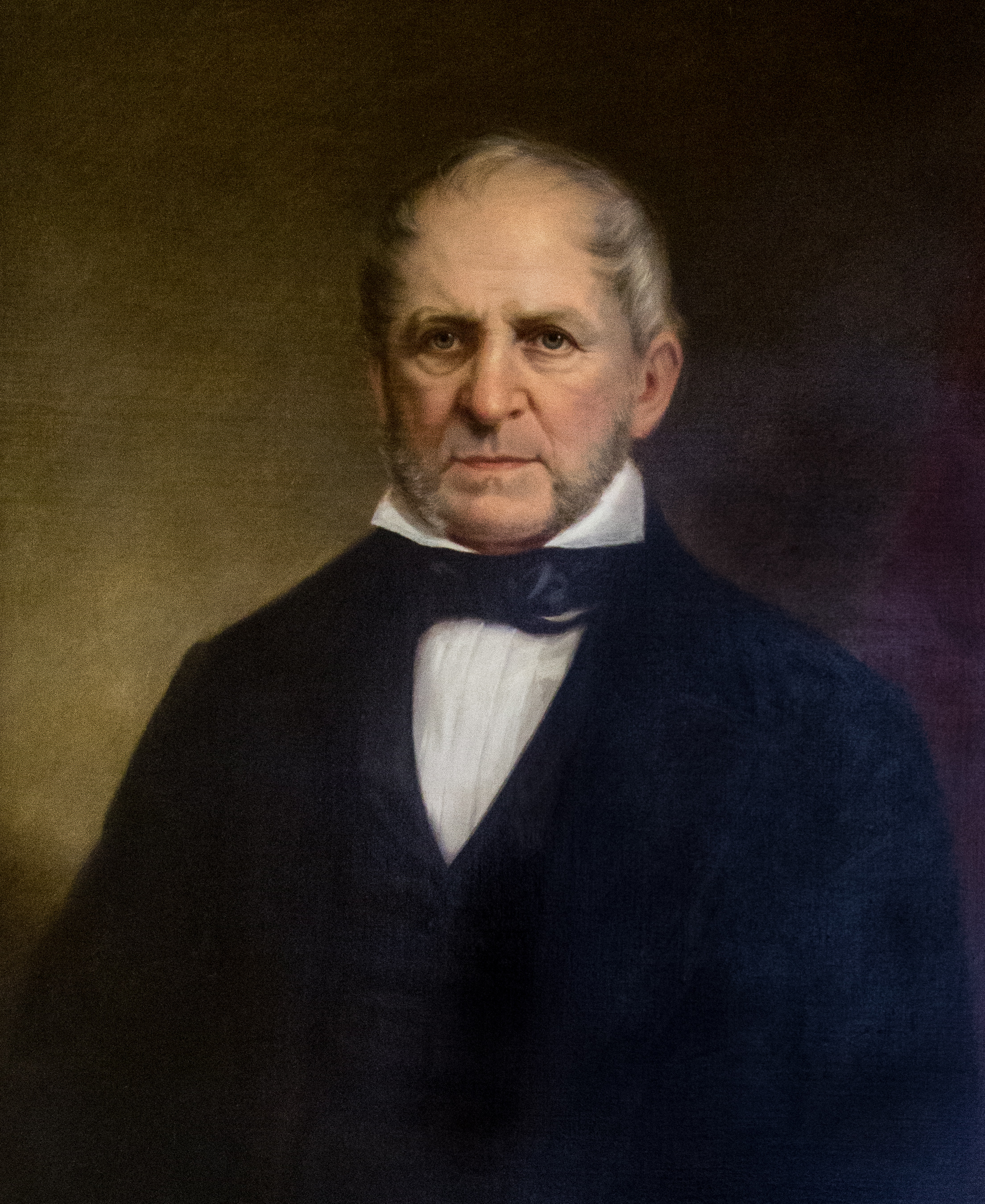
Governor William C. Gibbs

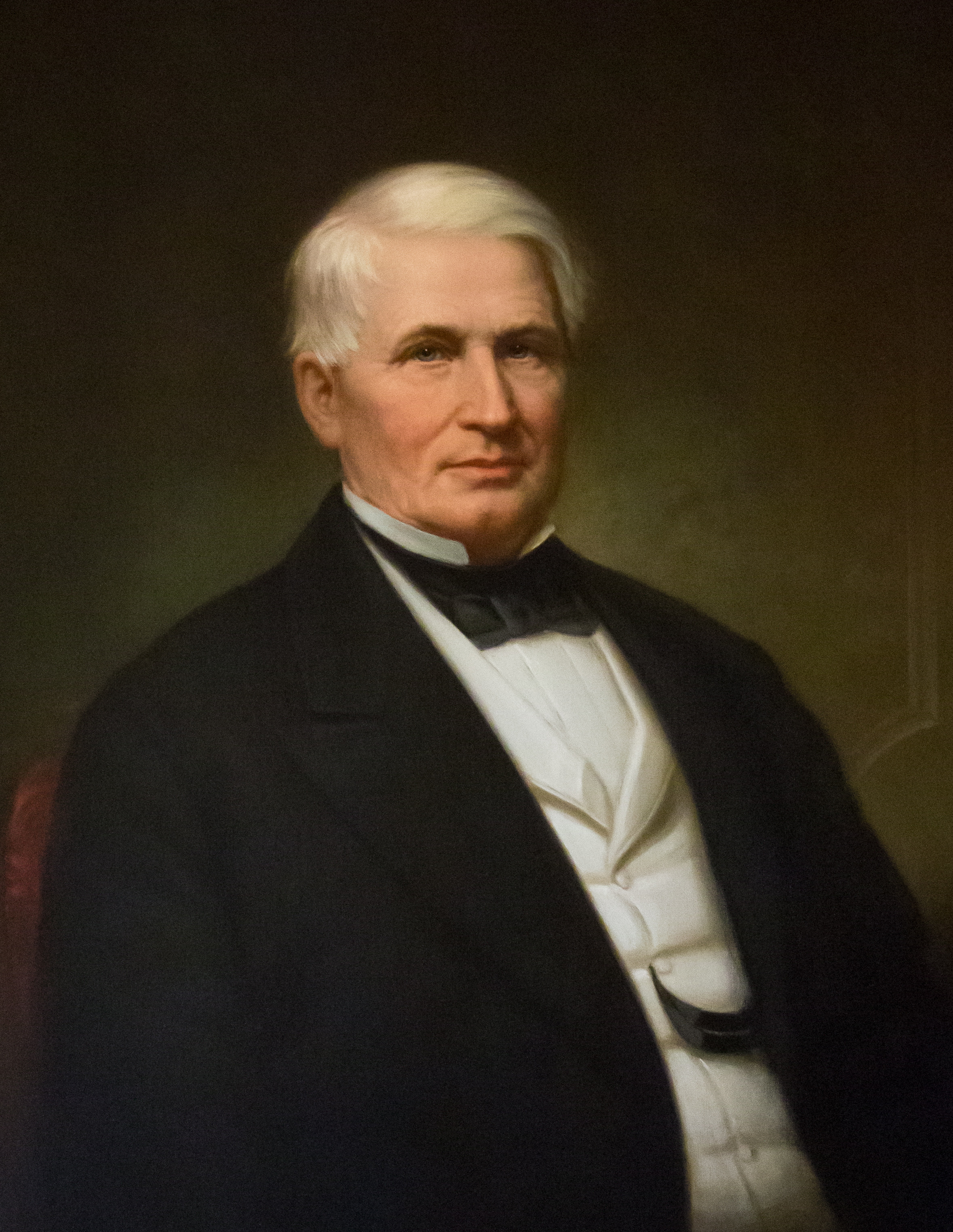
Governor Seth Padelford

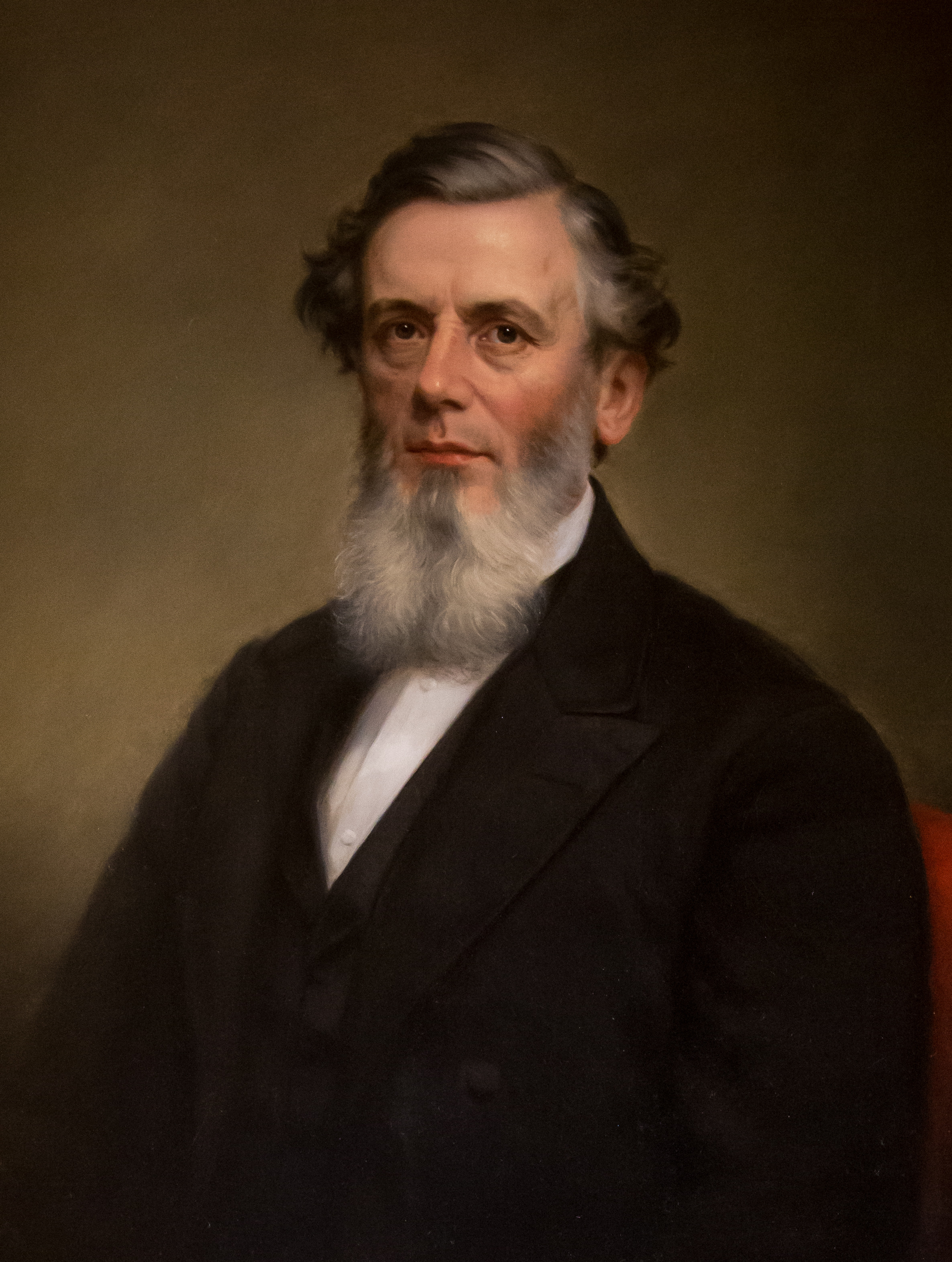
Governor Thomas G. Turner

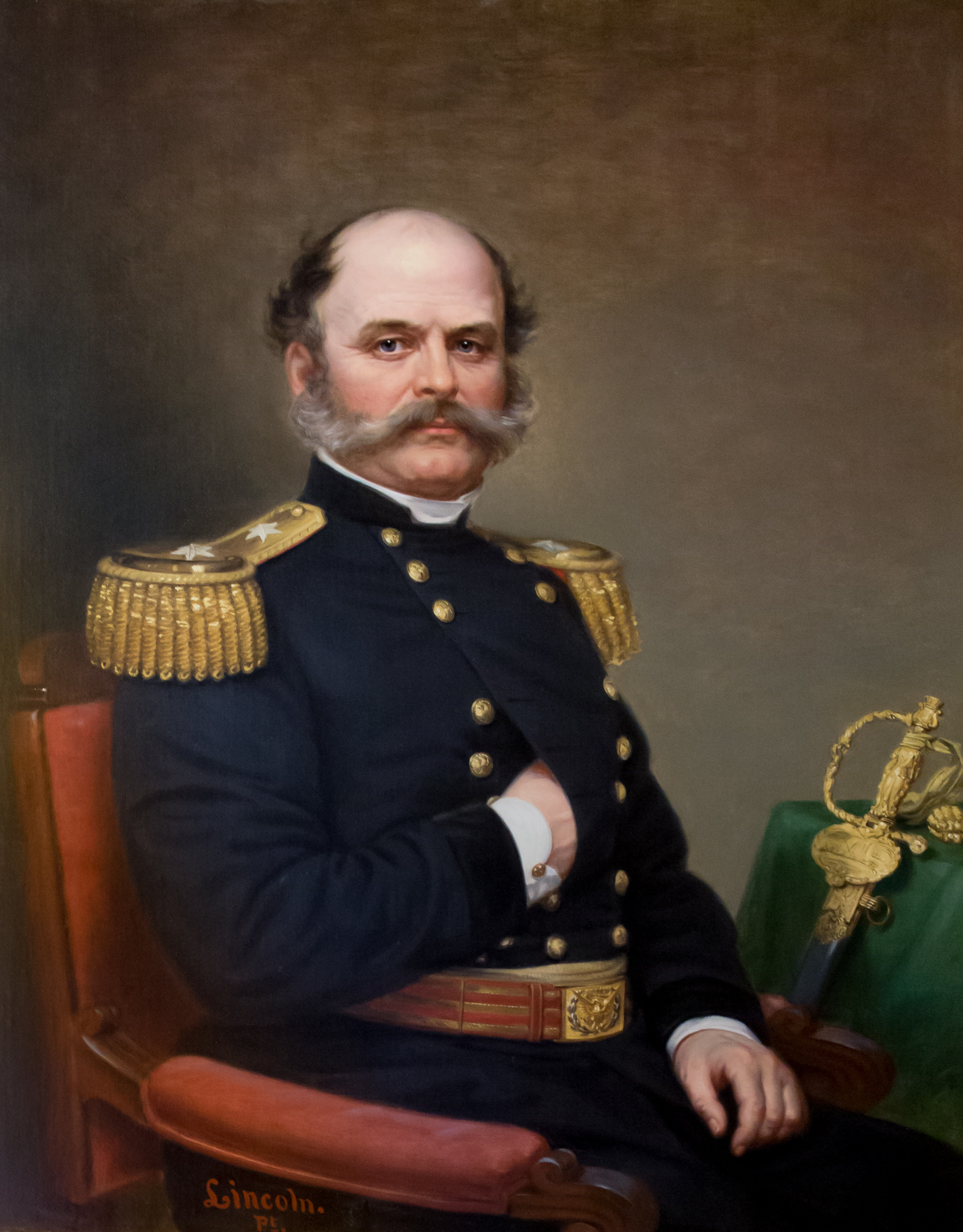
Governor Ambrose Burnside

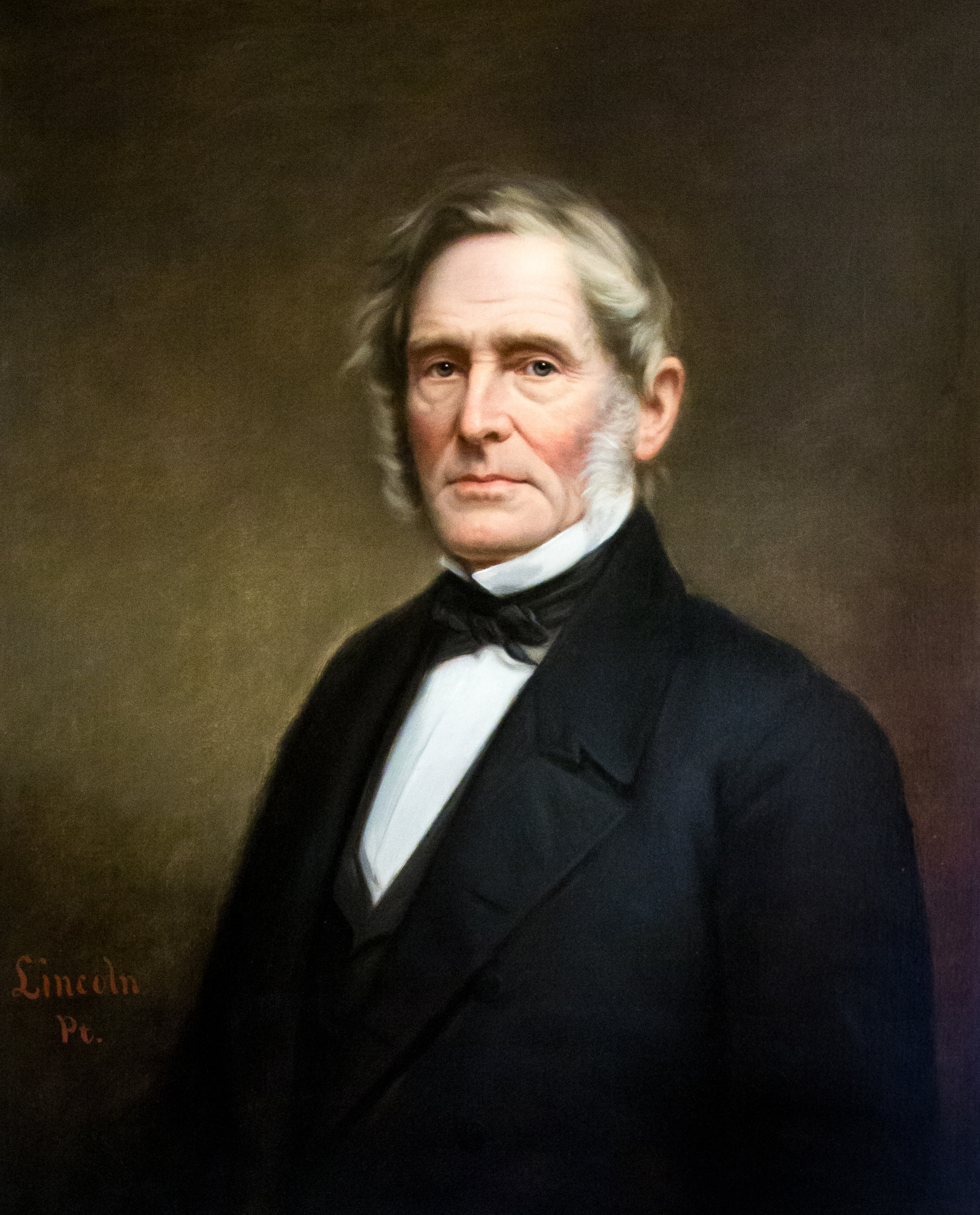
Governor Elisha Harris

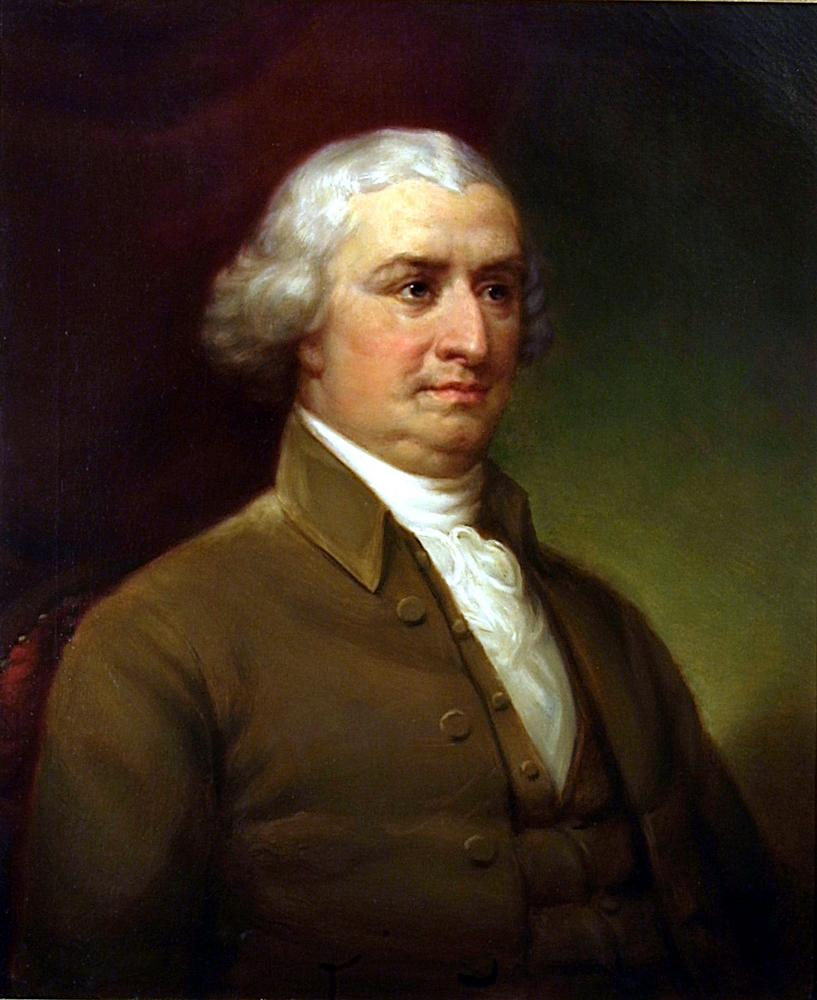
Statesman David Howell

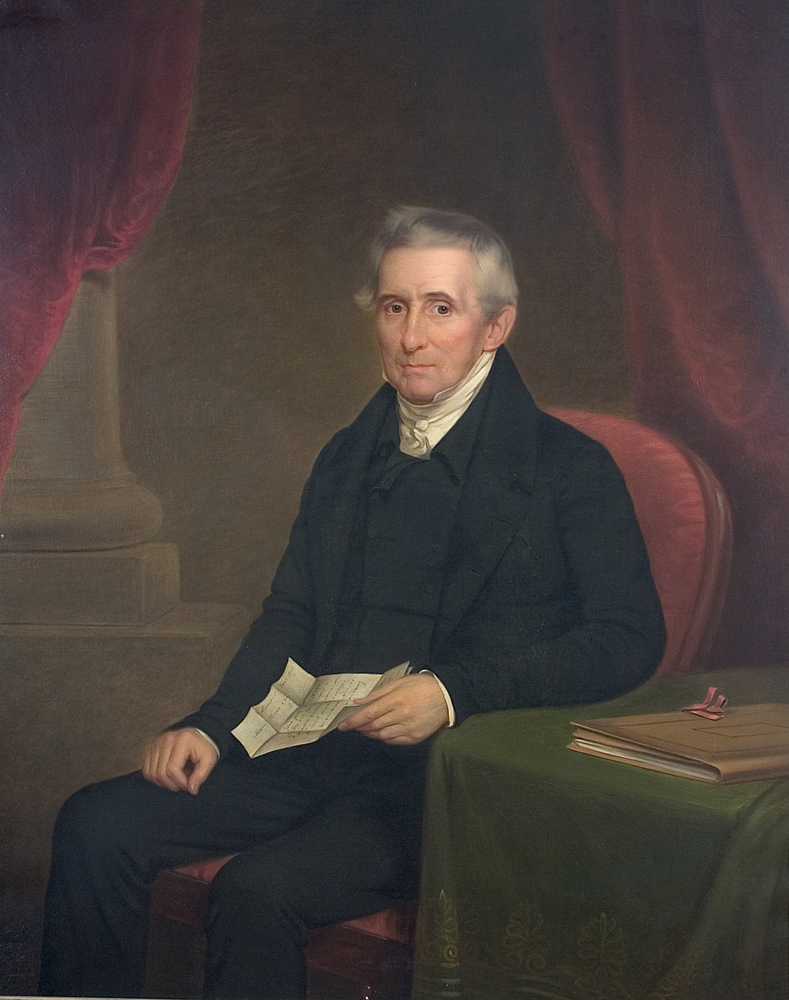
Merchant Thomas Poynton Ives, after an original by Chester Harding

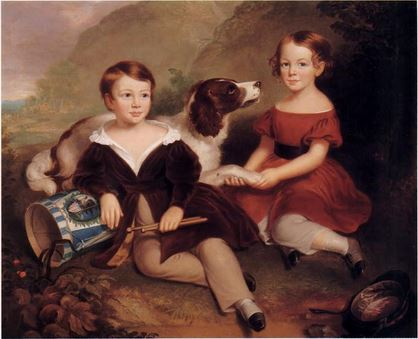
The Grosvenor Boys
