= William Sprague IV =

American politician and soldier (1830–1915)

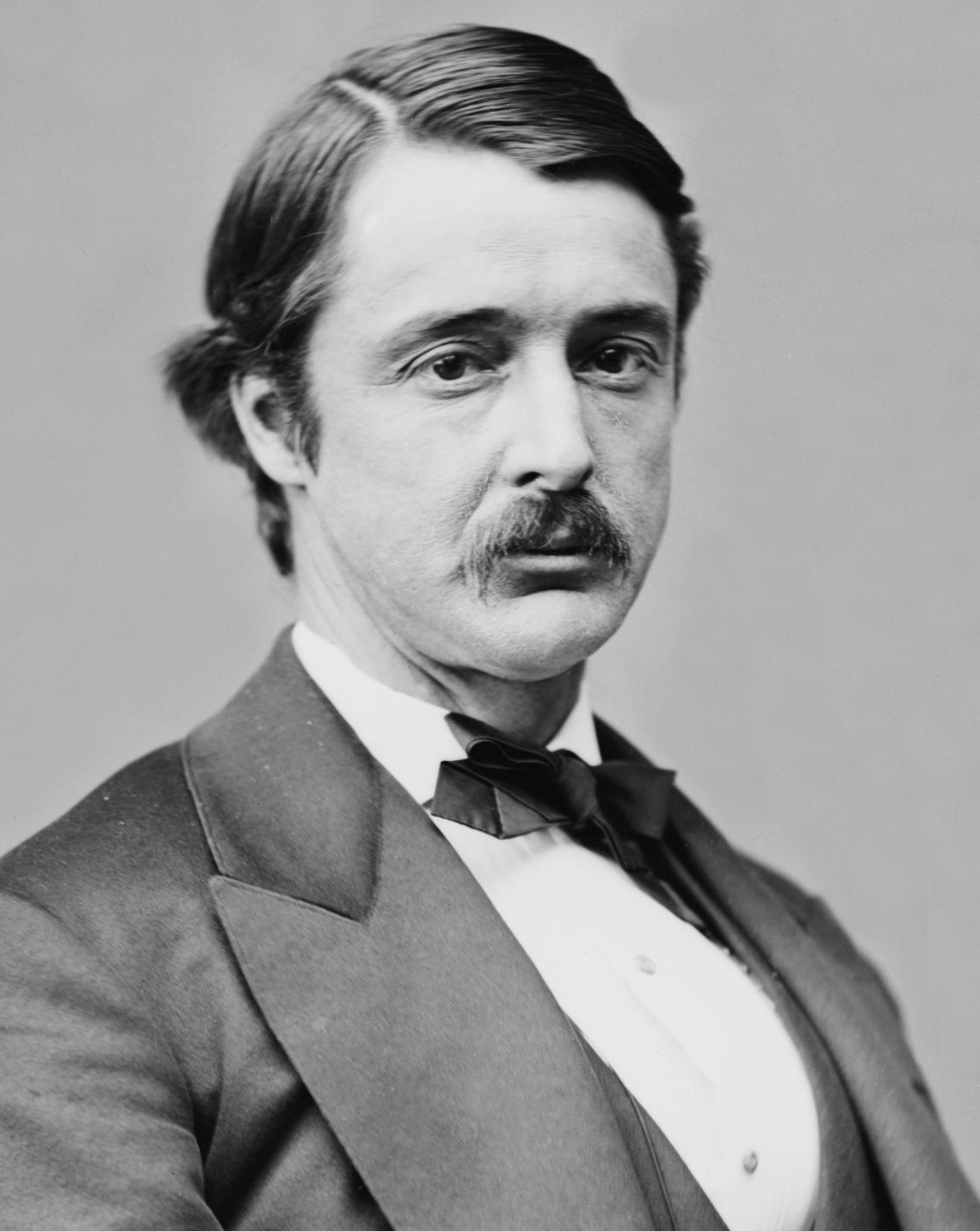
- Sprague, 1860–1875

United States Senator from Rhode Island
- In office March 4, 1863 – March 3, 1875
- Preceded by: Samuel G. Arnold
- Succeeded by: Ambrose Burnside

27th Governor of Rhode Island
- In office May 29, 1860 – March 3, 1863
- Lieutenant: J. Russell Bullock; Samuel G. Arnold; Seth Padelford
- Preceded by: Thomas G. Turner
- Succeeded by: William C. Cozzens

Personal details
- Born: William Sprague IV; September 12, 1830 Cranston, Rhode Island, U.S.
- Died: September 11, 1915 (aged 84) Paris, France
- Resting place: Swan Point Cemetery
- Party: Constitutional Union; Republican
- Spouses: Kate Chase (m. 1863; div. 1882) Dora Inez Clavert (m. 1883)
- Profession: Politician, Manufacturer

Military service
- Allegiance: Rhode Island; United States (Union)
- Years of service: 1848–1861
- Rank: Colonel
- Unit: Rhode Island Militia
- Commands: Providence Marine Corps of Artillery
- Battles/wars: American Civil War: First Battle of Bull Run

William Sprague IV (September 12, 1830 – September 11, 1915) was an American politician who served as the 27th governor of Rhode Island from 1860 to 1863, and a U.S. senator from 1863 to 1875. He participated in the First Battle of Bull Run during the American Civil War while he was a sitting governor.

== Early life and career ==
Sprague was born in the Gov. William Sprague Mansion in Cranston, Rhode Island, the youngest son of Amasa and Fanny Morgan Sprague. His uncle and namesake William Sprague III was also a governor and U.S. senator as well as a U.S. representative from Rhode Island. Sprague's family spent considerable time in Thorsby, Alabama, but eventually returned so William and his brother Amasa could attend the Irving Institute in Tarrytown, New York. Their education was cut short when their father was murdered on New Year's Eve in 1843. The murder was considered a major event of the period, and the trial of accused killer John Gordon was marked by anti-Irish bigotry; Gordon was subsequently found guilty and executed.

Both brothers were called to work in the family business, the A.& W. Sprague Manufacturing Company, the largest employer in Rhode Island, which was then under the direction of their uncle William III. When their uncle died in 1856, William and Amasa – along with their cousin Col. Byron Sprague, son of William III, and their mother Fanny Sprague and Aunt Harriet, widow of William III – became partners in the company.

The second incorporation of the A. & W. Sprague Company occurred on June 2, 1859. It soon was the largest calico printing textile mill in the world. The company ran five weaving mills in New England. The Hartford, Providence and Fishkill Railroad – of which William III had purchased controlling interest – connected the five mills to the Sprague Print Works in Cranston. The woven cloth was brought to Cranston to be printed. Sprague later became interested in linen weaving and locomotive building.

At age 18, Sprague joined the Providence Marine Corps of Artillery, a unit of the Rhode Island Militia. He enlisted as a private, but soon received his commission as a second lieutenant. Within three years Sprague had been promoted through the ranks to command the unit as a colonel. As the commander, Sprague personally funded all of its expenses, including uniforms, equipment, small arms, and a full battery of light artillery.

=== Innovations and ideas ===
After leaving the Senate, he resumed the direction of his manufacturing establishments. He operated the first rotary machine for making horseshoes, perfected a mowing machine, and also various processes in calico printing, especially that of direct printing on a large scale with the extract of madder without a chemical bath. Sprague claimed to have discovered what he called the "principle of the orbit as inherent in social forces." He asserted that money is endowed with two tendencies, the distributive and the aggregative. When the aggregative tendency predominates, as before the Civil War, decadence results; but when the distributive tendency is in the ascendancy, as it was later in the 19th century, there is progress.

== Politics ==
=== Governor ===
Sprague was the Conservative candidate for governor in 1860, defeating the Republican candidate Seth Padelford, a Radical Republican. Sprague's fusion candidacy drew support from Conservative Republicans, former Whigs, and Democrats and was endorsed by both the Rhode Island Democratic Party and a conservative state convention. Conservatives charged Padelford with representing "agitation, anarchy, disunion," and "black Republicanism" and portrayed the election as a choice between "Union and Disunion;" Sprague's election was celebrated as the victory of conservatism over abolitionism. Sprague spent over $100,000 of his own money on the campaign.

At twenty-nine years old, Sprague was the youngest governor in the nation at that time. He was sometimes known as the "boy governor" and campaigned as the "Young Men's" candidate in 1860.

Following the election, Sprague's supporters coalesced in the Constitutional Union Party. Although the party's presidential candidate, John Bell, lost the 1860 United States presidential election to the Republican candidate Abraham Lincoln, Rhode Island Constitutional Unionists remained dominant during the first years of the American Civil War.

Sprague was re-elected in 1861 and 1862, in the latter year without opposition. Following his election to the United States Senate, Sprague helped to swing a coalition of conservatives and War Democrats behind the Republican candidate, James Y. Smith, in the election to choose his successor. Sprague's political transformation was influenced by his connection with Kate Chase, the daughter of the Republican U.S. treasury secretary Salmon P. Chase, who persuaded Sprague to become a Republican.

As governor, Sprague backed the repeal of Rhode Island's personal liberty law, weakening legal protections for free people of color targeted by slave catchers. He was closely associated with proslavery cotton manufacturers and was derisively labeled the "Cotton King of New England." In 1862, he attended the War Governors' Conference in Altoona, Pennsylvania, which ultimately backed Lincoln's Emancipation Proclamation and the Union war effort.

=== U.S. Senate ===
Retiring from the governor's office in 1863, he was elected by the state Senate to two six-year terms as US Senator from Rhode Island, taking office on March 4, 1863, and serving until March 3, 1875.

He served as chairman of the committees on public lands and on manufactures and as a member of the committees on commerce and on military affairs.

== Military service ==
As the Civil War approached, Sprague promised U.S. President Abraham Lincoln the support of Rhode Island. Upon Lincoln's call for volunteers in April 1861, a brigade of two infantry regiments was raised by Rhode Island, with Sprague organizing the First Rhode Island Regiment, and loaning the state $100,000 to outfit it, while his brother supplied 96 horses for the artillery brigade.

Sprague, believing that the war would last only 48 hours, accompanied the Rhode Island brigade, under the command of Colonel Ambrose Burnside, in the First Battle of Bull Run on July 21, 1861. During the battle, while Sprague acted as an aide to General Burnside, his horse was shot from under him. The Confederate victory made it clear to Sprague that the war would last longer than two days. Although he was offered a commission as a brigadier general of Volunteers on August 9, 1861 (with a date of rank of May 17, 1861), he declined the appointment to focus on his duties as governor.

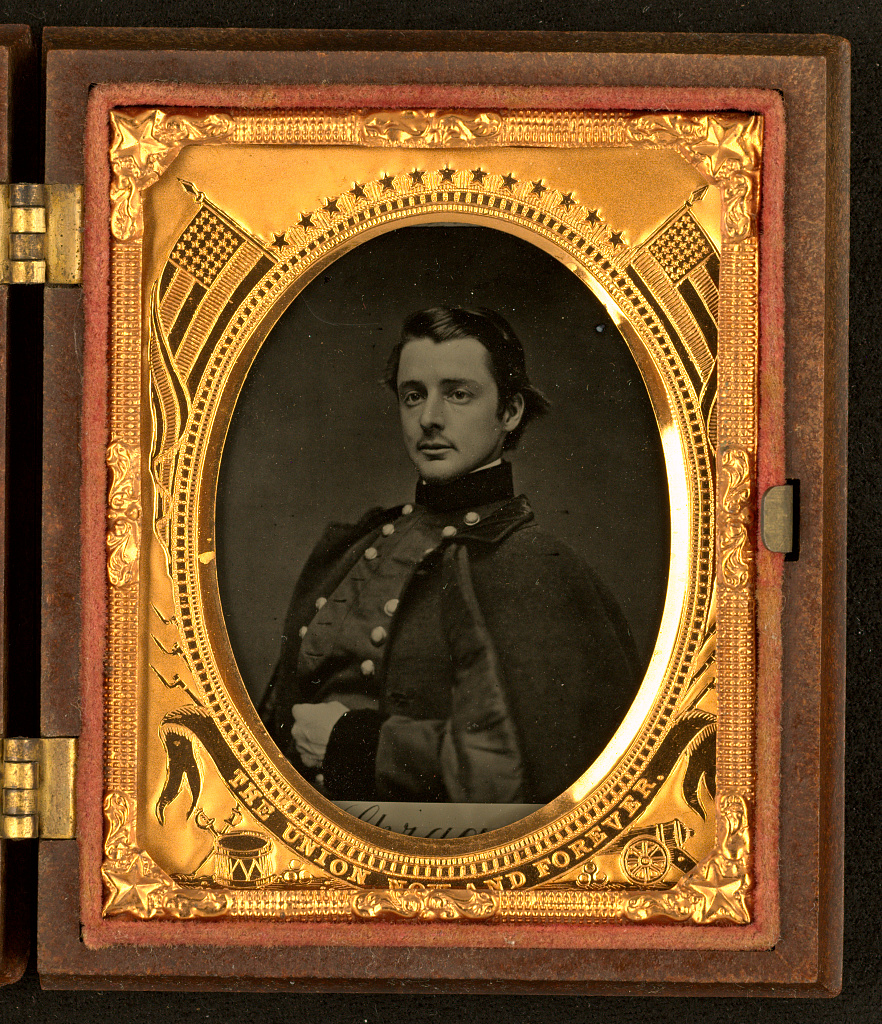
Ruby ambrotype of William Sprague in frame captioned "Union Now and Forever" (Liljenquist Collection)

== Personal life ==
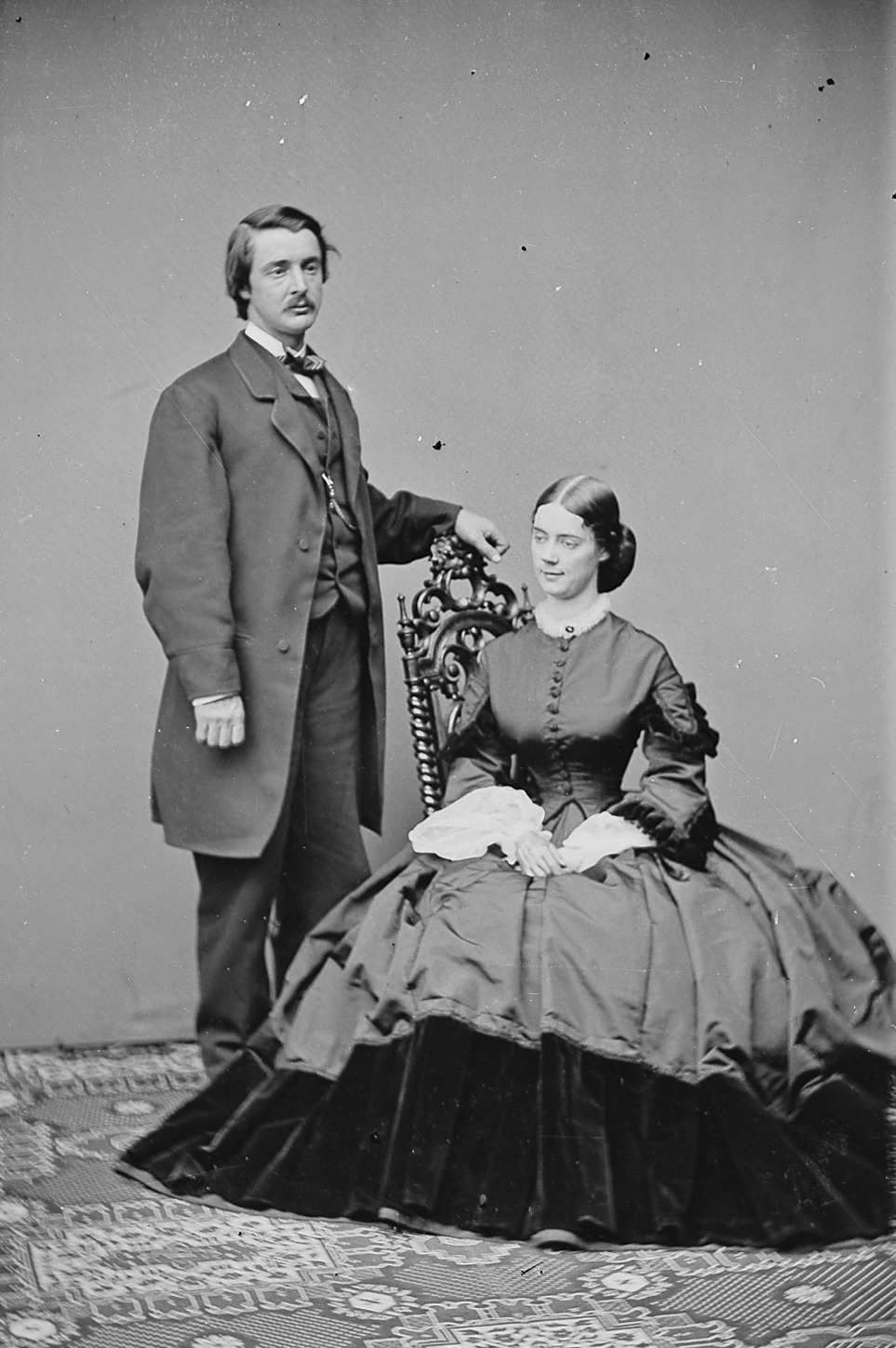
William and Kate Sprague

On November 12, 1863, Sprague married Kate Chase, daughter of Salmon P. Chase, the former Governor of Ohio and current Secretary of the Treasury. She was considered the belle of Washington. Fifty people were invited to the ceremony, which took place in the parlor of the mansion where she lived with her father. The guests included President Abraham Lincoln and his entire cabinet (with the exception of Montgomery Blair, who refused to attend), senators, governors, generals, diplomats, and select congressmen. An additional 500 people were invited to the reception which followed.

Sprague's wedding gift to Kate was a tiara of matched pearls and diamonds that cost $5700. As the bride entered the room, the Marine Band played "The Kate Chase March" which composer Thomas Mark Clark had written for the occasion.

There was much speculation in Washington leading up to the wedding – and by historians afterward – that Kate Chase's attraction to Sprague may have been monetary, as her father was losing money by serving as Treasury Secretary, and had a burning desire to be President, which required sufficient funds to mount a campaign. Sprague was not educated, having left school early to join the family business, and was small, thin and not particularly attractive by the standards of the day. He was, however, very rich.

Although their marriage began well, quarreling became more common. They had four children:

- William "Willie" Sprague V (1865–1890), who died by suicide at age 25 in 1890.
- Ethel Chase Sprague (1869–1936), who married Dr. Frank Donaldson (1856–1906).
- Catherine "Kitty" Sprague (1872–1910), who was mentally disabled and lived with her mother.
- Portia Sprague (1873–1932), who married Frank Browning (1867–1932).

William's financial and political fortunes rapidly deteriorated in 1873, with the financial panic. His holdings were extensive both in Rhode Island and nationally. The death of his father-in-law, Salmon P. Chase, in the same year who had become Chief Justice of the United States, added to his family problems. Severe setbacks occurred to the A. & W. Sprague Company following the Panic of 1873.

=== Marriage ===
Likewise, the Spragues' marriage unravelled as William began to drink more, had affairs with other women and began to criticize Kate's spending. Kate allegedly had an affair with New York senator Roscoe Conkling. According to popular rumor, in 1879 Sprague chased Conkling off his Narragansett estate after catching him with Kate, thus ending the alleged affair.

The couple divorced in 1882. William stayed with his father and the daughters lived with Kate Chase, who took back her maiden name after the divorce. After spending some time in Europe, Kate lived with her daughters outside Washington, D.C. at Edgewood, her father's estate. When her only son Willie Sprague killed himself at age 25 in 1890, Kate Chase became a recluse. She died in poverty at her homestead, Edgewood, in 1899.

=== Canonchet ===
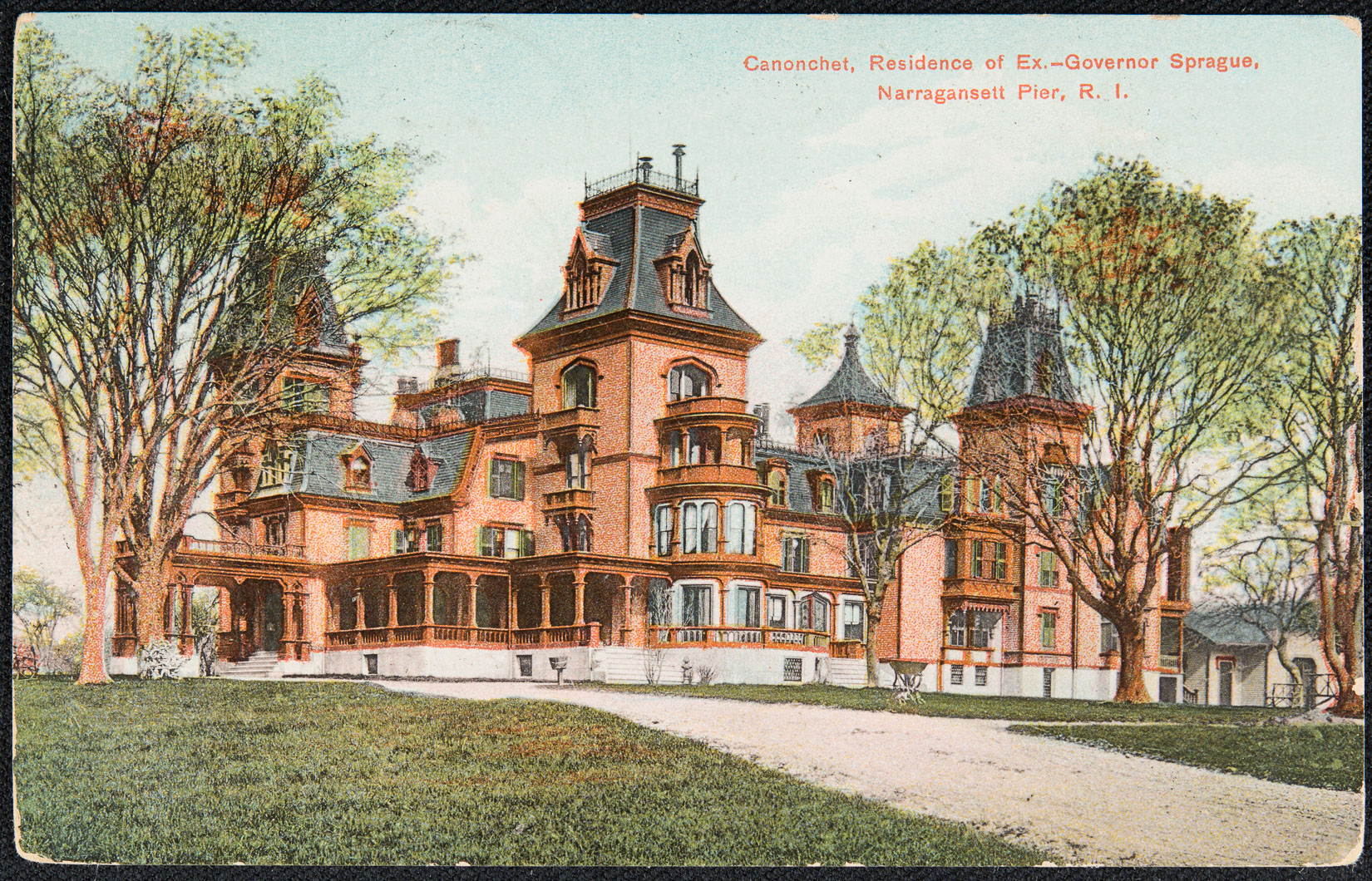
Canonchet

In 1850, Sprague purchased the William Robertson farm in Narragansett, which was known to have once been the location of the summer campsite of Narragansett Sachem Canonchet. In 1863, Sprague built a grand 64-room, four-story Victorian mansion on the property, which he named Canonchet after the Sachem. The mansion burned to the ground on October 11, 1909. The South County Museum opened on the Canonchet Farm grounds in 1985.

=== Second marriage ===
Following his divorce, William Sprague married Dora Inez Calvert (1859–1938) of West Virginia in Staunton, Virginia, in 1883. He regained his interest in politics to become the first Narragansett, Rhode Island Town Council President in 1900. On October 11, 1909, a fire destroyed the Sprague mansion, including Sprague's diaries and other valuable artifacts. The Spragues moved to Paris. During World War I, they opened their apartment as a convalescent hospital for the wounded of all nationalities.

== Death and burial ==
Sprague died of complications from meningitis on September 11, 1915, a day short of his 85th birthday. Following simple funeral services in France, his wife arranged for his body to be brought back to Rhode Island draped in an American flag. He received full military honors when laid to rest in the family tomb at Swan Point Cemetery in Providence, Rhode Island.

Party political offices
Preceded by Elisha R. Potter	Democratic nominee for Governor of Rhode Island; 1860	Vacant Title next held by William C. Cozzens
First	Union nominee for Governor of Rhode Island; 1861, 1862	Succeeded by None
Preceded by Horace A. Kimball	Democratic nominee for Governor of Rhode Island; 1883	Succeeded by Thomas W. Segar
Political offices
Preceded by Thomas G. Turner	Governor of Rhode Island; May 29, 1860 – March 3, 1863	Succeeded by William C. Cozzens
U.S. Senate
Preceded by Samuel G. Arnold	U.S. senator (Class 1) from Rhode Island; March 4, 1863 – March 3, 1875; Served alongside: Henry B. Anthony	Succeeded by Ambrose E. Burnside
Honorary titles
Preceded by John Henderson	Most senior living U.S. senator (Sitting or former); April 12, 1913 – September 11, 1915	Succeeded by George Edmunds
