= Thomas G. Turner =

American politician

Thomas Goodwin Turner
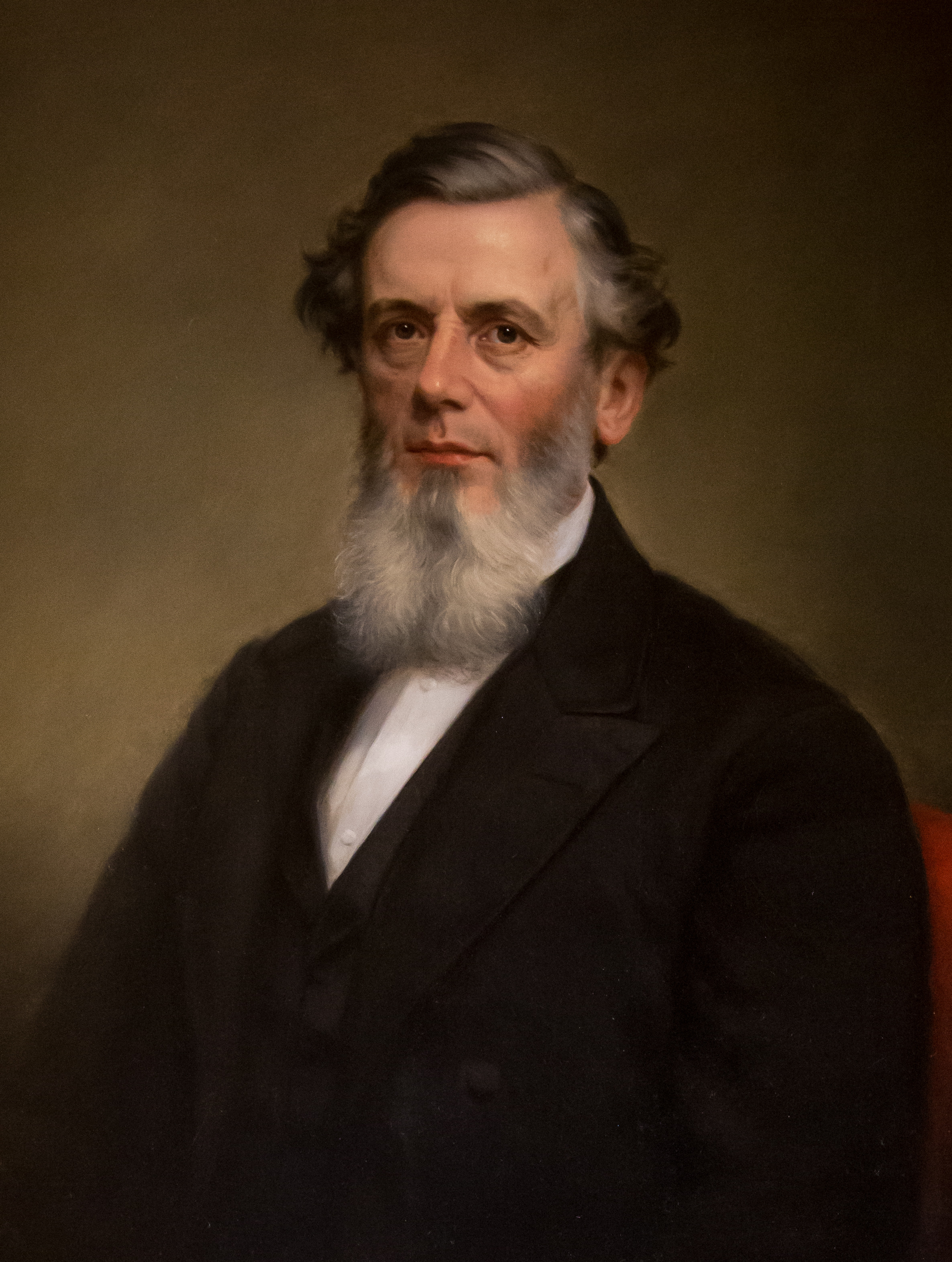
- Official portrait in the Rhode Island State House by James Sullivan Lincoln

Lieutenant Governor of Rhode Island
- In office May 26, 1857 – May 31, 1859
- Preceded by: Nicholas Brown III
- Succeeded by: Isaac Saunders

26th Governor of Rhode Island
- In office May 31, 1859 – May 29, 1860
- Lieutenant: Isaac Saunders
- Preceded by: Elisha Dyer
- Succeeded by: William Sprague

Personal details
- Born: October 24, 1810 Warren, Rhode Island, U.S.
- Died: January 3, 1875 (aged 64) Warren, Rhode Island, U.S.
- Resting place: South Burial Ground, Warren
- Party: Republican
- Spouse: Mary Pierce Luther
- Profession: Politician, Businessman

Thomas Goodwin Turner (October 24, 1810 – January 3, 1875) was an American politician and businessman who was the 26th governor of Rhode Island from 1859 to 1860.

== Early life ==
Turner was born in Warren in Bristol County, Rhode Island. He started work as a clerk in a dry goods store at the age of 14, in Newport, Rhode Island. He was self-educated, and returned to Warren to co-found a dry goods and tailoring business there.

He was married to Mary Pierce Luther. They had seven children, four of whom died in very early life.

During the years 1857-58, Turner became an active member of the Baptist Church in Warren. He was a trustee of Brown University and a member of the Rhode Island Historical Society.

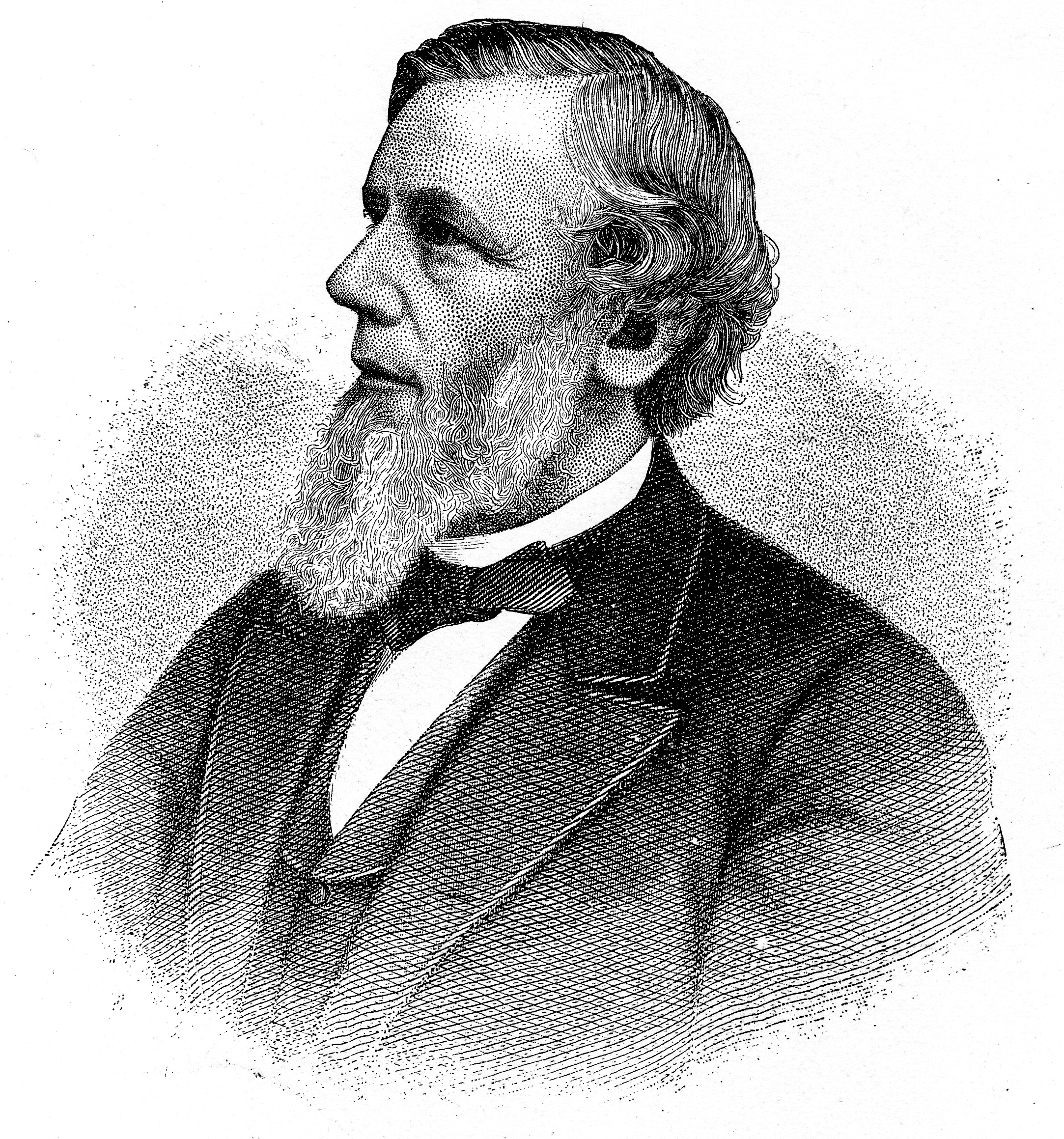
Engraving

== Career ==
Turner served in the state militia during the Dorr Rebellion, and commanded the pro-Governor King forces at Acote's Hill. After the rebellion, Turner was elected to the State Assembly from Warren. He served as lieutenant governor from 1857 to 1859.

Turner succeeded his fellow Republican Elisha Dyer as Governor of Rhode Island, serving from May 31, 1859 to May 29, 1860.

He was a supporter of Abraham Lincoln, and failed to win renomination by the Republican Party in 1860. After leaving office, he was appointed by President Lincoln to the position of First Collector of Internal Revenue for the First District of Rhode Island.

== Later years ==
Turner was President of the Equitable Insurance Company, of Providence, Rhode Island, in his later years. He died in his home in Warren, Rhode Island. He was buried at South Burial Ground, Warren, Bristol County, Rhode Island.

Party political offices
Preceded by Elisha Dyer	Republican nominee for Governor of Rhode Island; 1859	Succeeded by Seth Padelford
Political offices
Preceded by Nicholas Brown III	Lieutenant Governor of Rhode Island; 1857–1859	Succeeded by Isaac Saunders
Preceded by Elisha Dyer	Governor of Rhode Island; 1859–1860	Succeeded by William Sprague
