= 1860 Rhode Island gubernatorial election =

- April 4, 1860
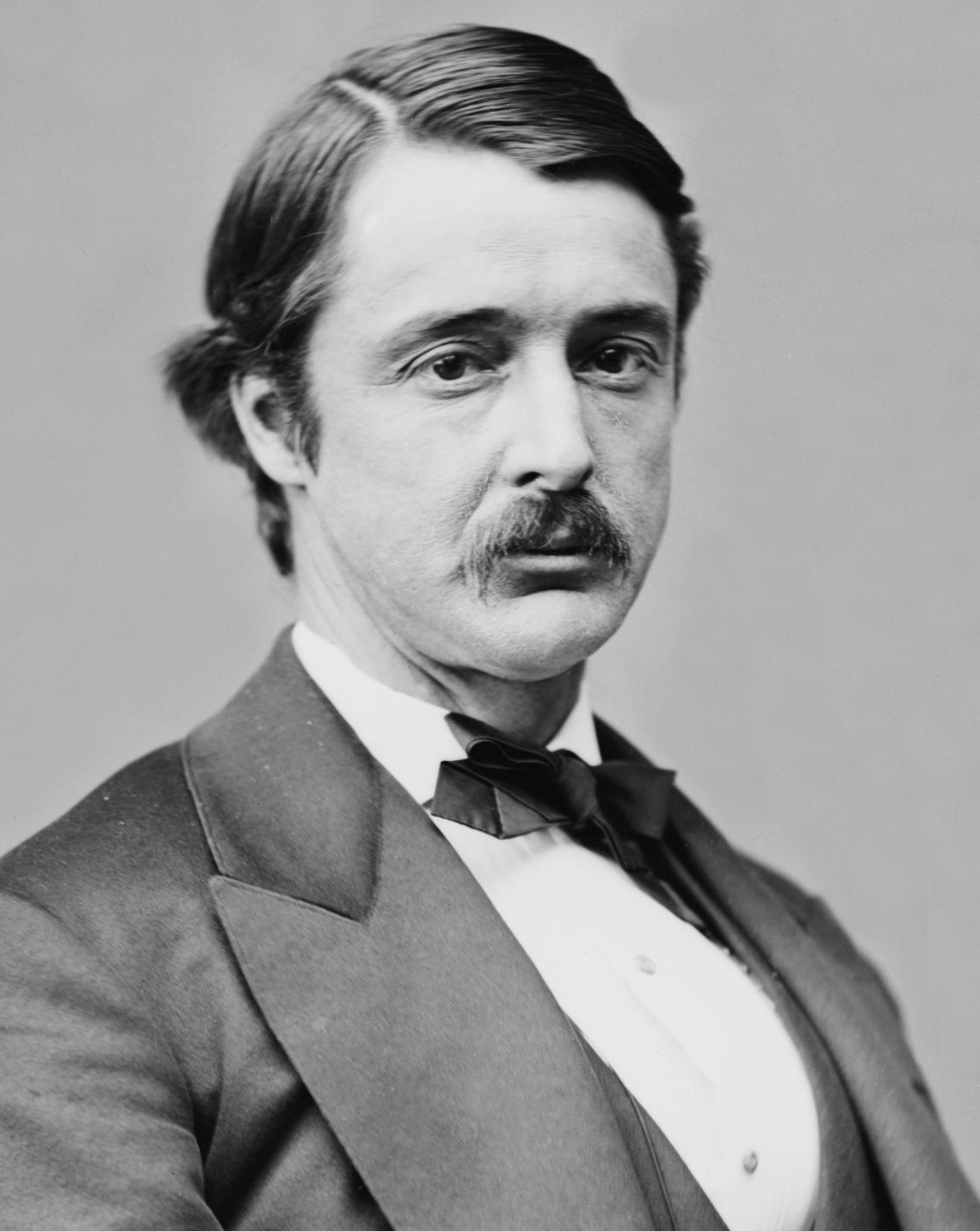

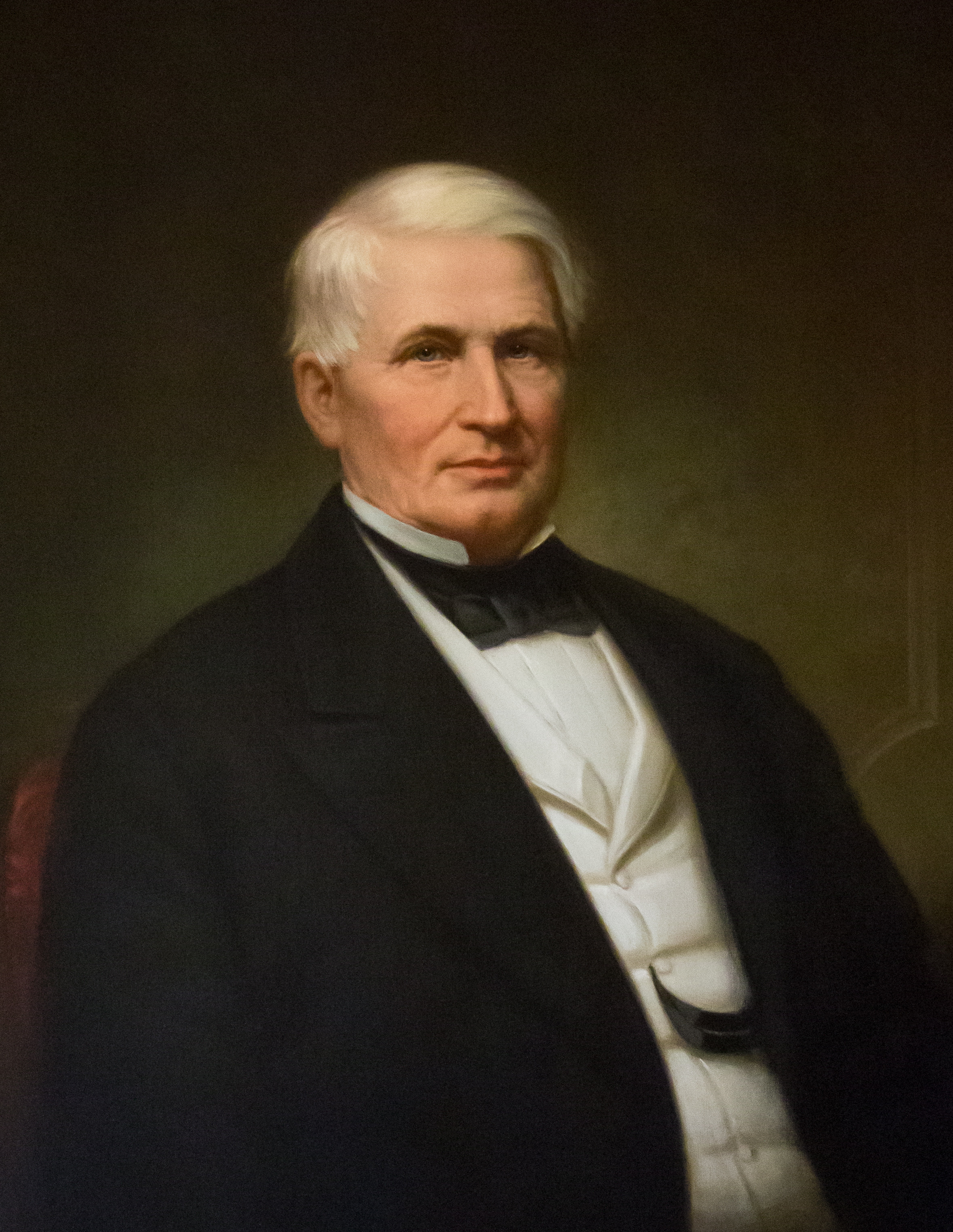
Nominee	William Sprague IV	Seth Padelford
Party	Democratic	Republican
Alliance	Conservative
Popular vote	12,278	10,740
Percentage	53.34%	46.66%
- County results Sprague: 50–60% Padelford: 50–60%
Governor before election
Thomas G. Turner
Republican
Elected Governor
William Sprague IV
Democratic

A gubernatorial election was held in Rhode Island on April 4, 1860. The Democratic and Conservative candidate William Sprague IV defeated the Republican former member of the Rhode Island House of Representatives from Providence Seth Padelford.

At the Republican state convention, Padelford, a Radical Republican, defeated the incumbent governor Thomas G. Turner. Padelford's nomination precipitated a movement by Conservative Republicans, former Whigs, and Democrats to jointly nominate Sprague as the conservative fusion candidate. Sprague's surrogates portrayed the election as a choice between "Union and Disunion" and charged Padelford with representing "agitation, anarchy," and "black Republicanism." The conservatives used several names during the campaign, including "Young Men's," "Conservative Republican," "Democratic," "Military," "Conservative Union," and "American." Sprague's coalition subsequently became the foundation for the Rhode Island Constitutional Union Party.

== Nominations ==
=== Conservative Party ===
A convention of the "conservative men of Rhode Island" met at Providence on February 1, 1860 and nominated Sprague for governor. Sprague declined this nomination. A second state convention was held on February 16, concurrently with the Democratic convention, where Sprague was again nominated unanimously.

==== Candidate ====
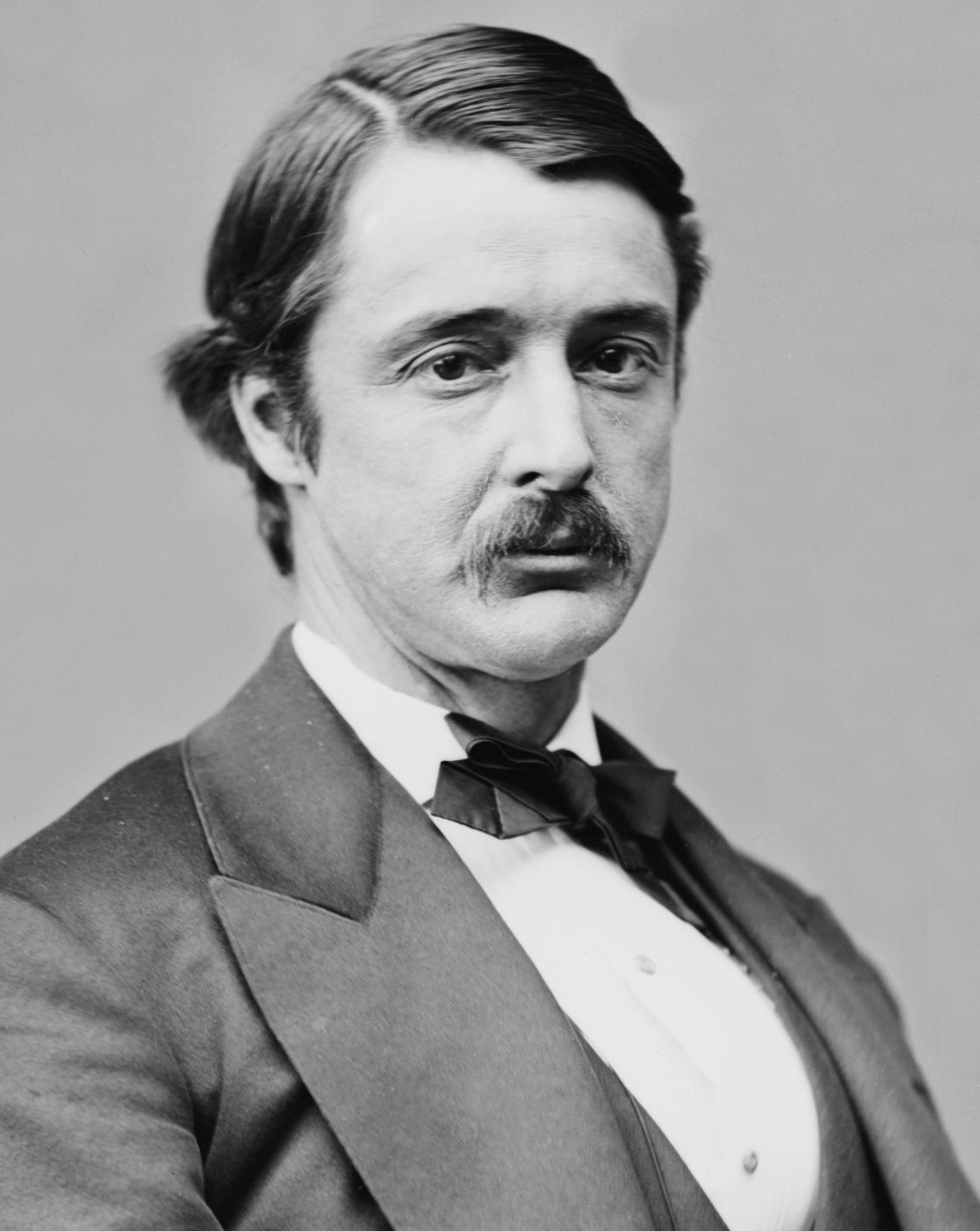
William Sprague IV

=== Democratic Party ===
The Democratic state convention was held at Providence on February 16, 1860, concurrently with the Conservative Union convention. Sprague was nominated unanimously.

==== Candidate ====
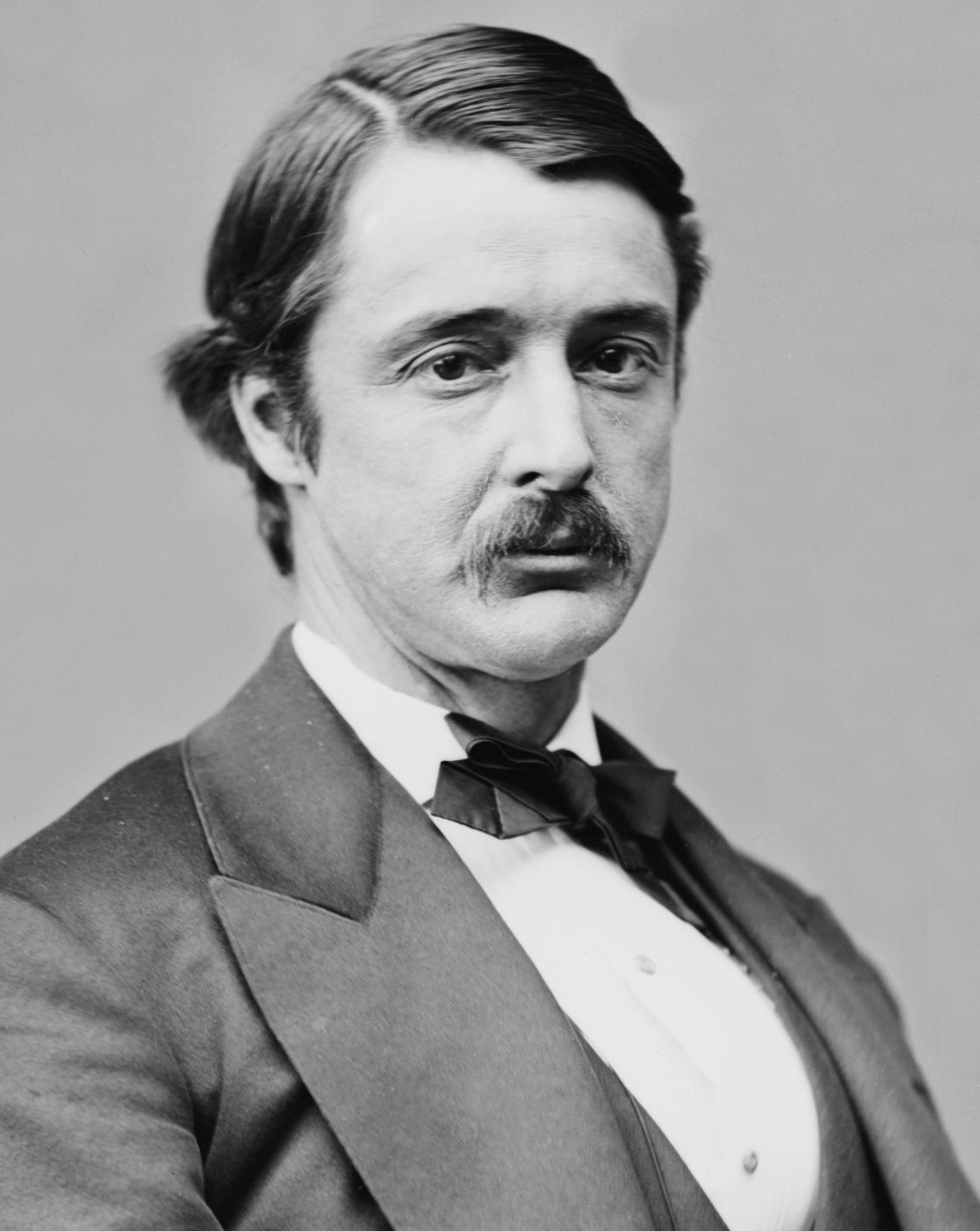
William Sprague IV

=== Republican Party ===
The Republican state convention met at Providence on January 4, 1850. Padelford defeated Turner on the first ballot.

==== Candidates ====
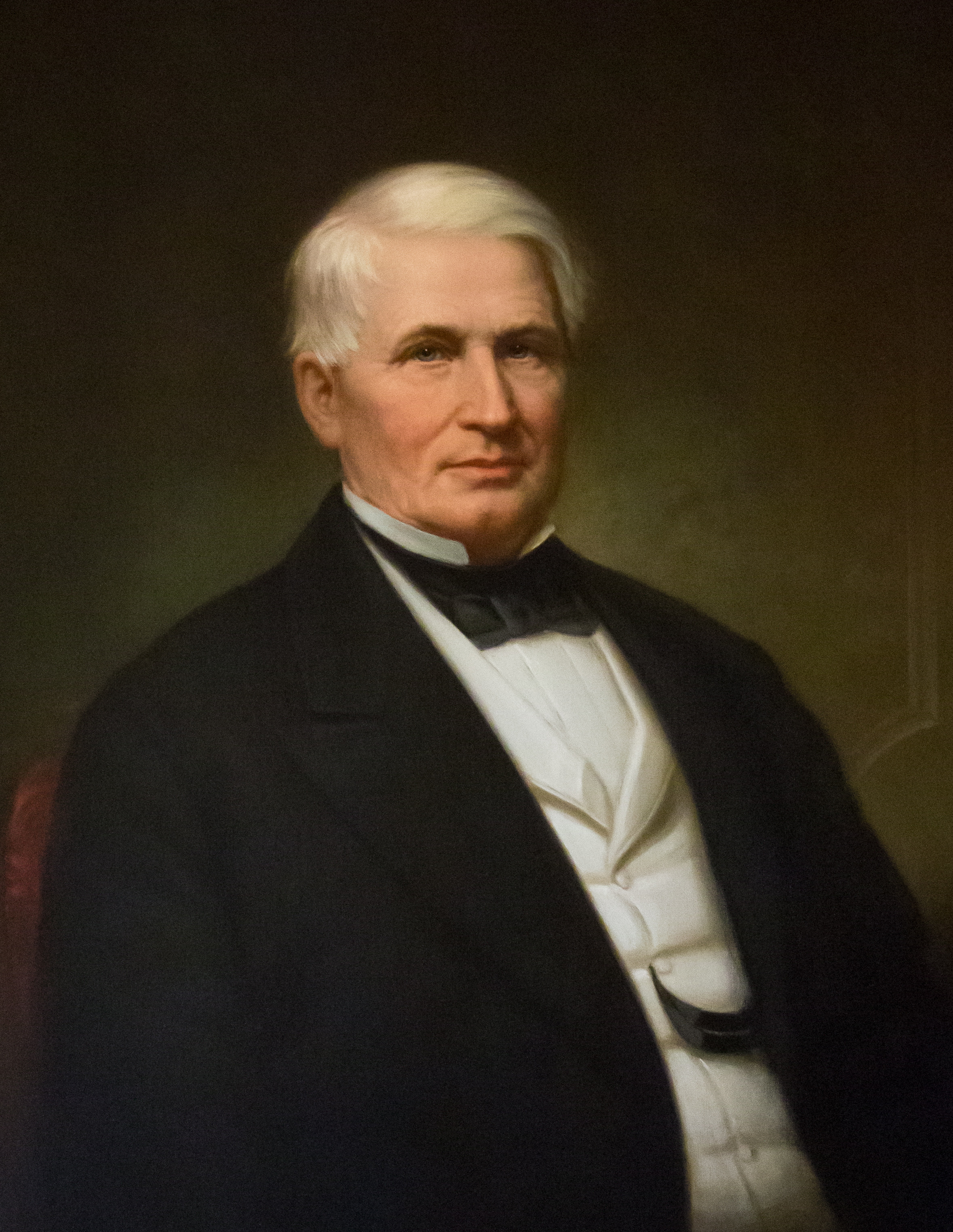
Former State Representative
Seth Padelford

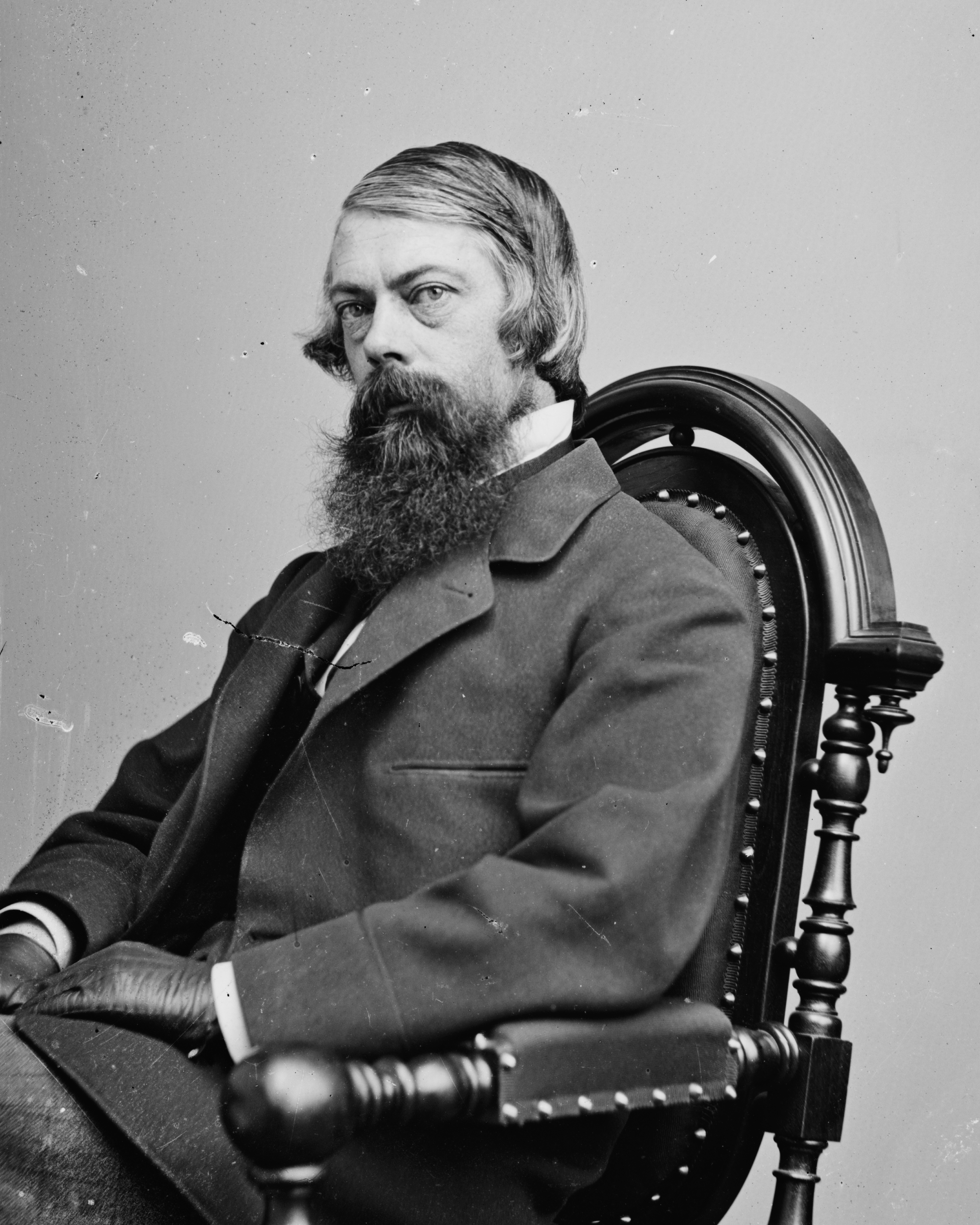
Former Lt. Governor
Samuel G. Arnold

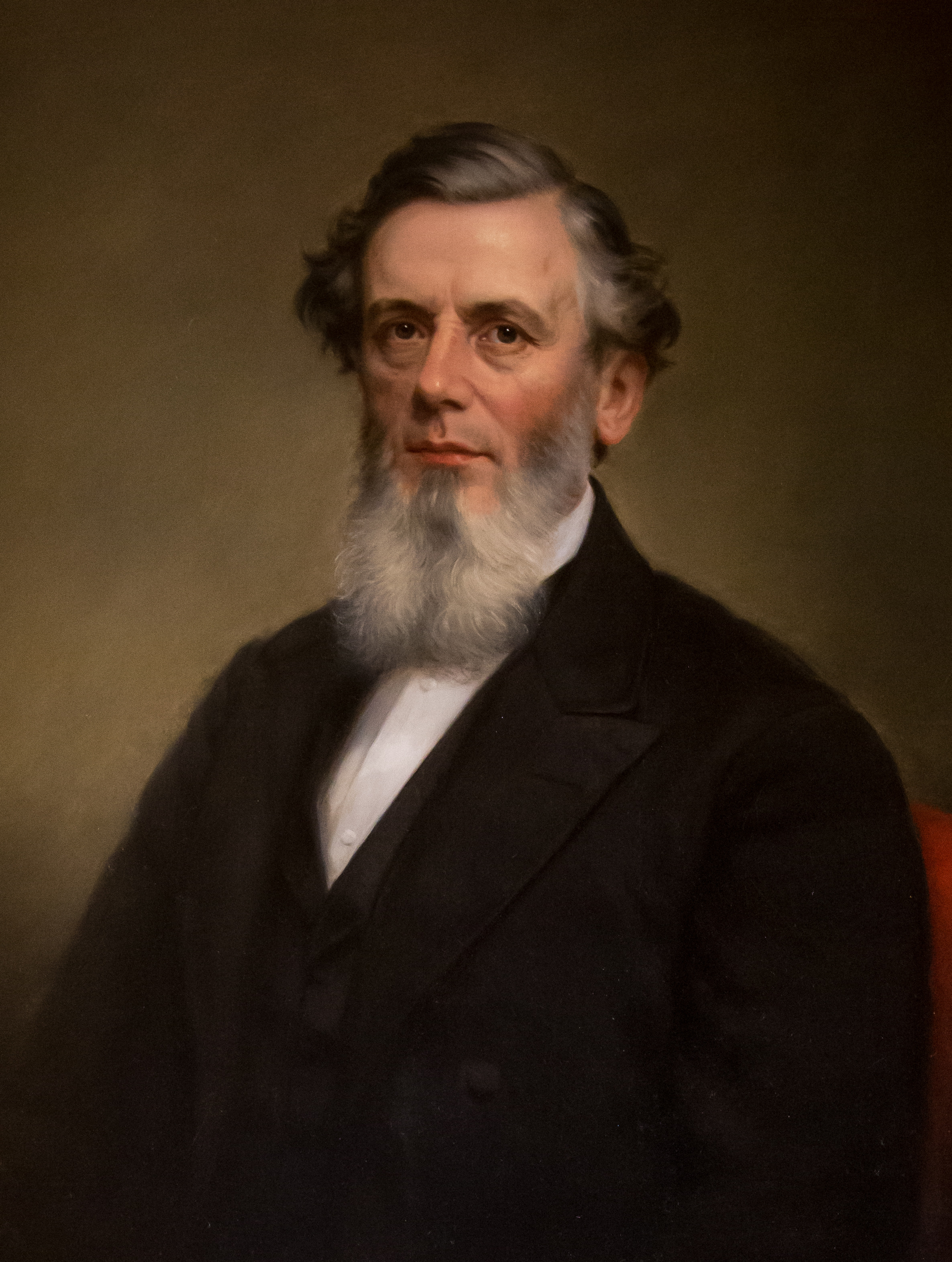
Governor
Thomas G. Turner

==== Gubernatorial nomination ====
Gubernatorial ballot
Candidate	1st
Seth Padelford	55
Samuel G. Arnold	34
Thomas G. Turner	15

== General election ==
1860 Rhode Island gubernatorial election
Party	Candidate	Votes	%
Democratic	William Sprague IV	12,278	53.34
Republican	Seth Padelford	10,740	46.66
Total votes		23,018	100.00
Democratic gain from Republican			

== Bibliography ==
- DeSimone, Russel J.; Schofield, Daniel C. (October 2015), Rhode Island Election Tickets: A Survey (PDF), Kingston, RI: University of Rhode Island
- Dubin, Michael J. (2003). United States Gubernatorial Elections, 1776–1860: The Official Results by State and County. Jefferson, NC: McFarland and Company. ISBN 978-0-7864-1439-0.
- Smith, Adam I. P. (2017). The Stormy Present: Conservatism and the Problem of Slavery in Northern Politics, 1846–1865. Chapel Hill: University of North Carolina Press. ISBN 978-1-4696-3389-3.
