= Seth Padelford =

American politician

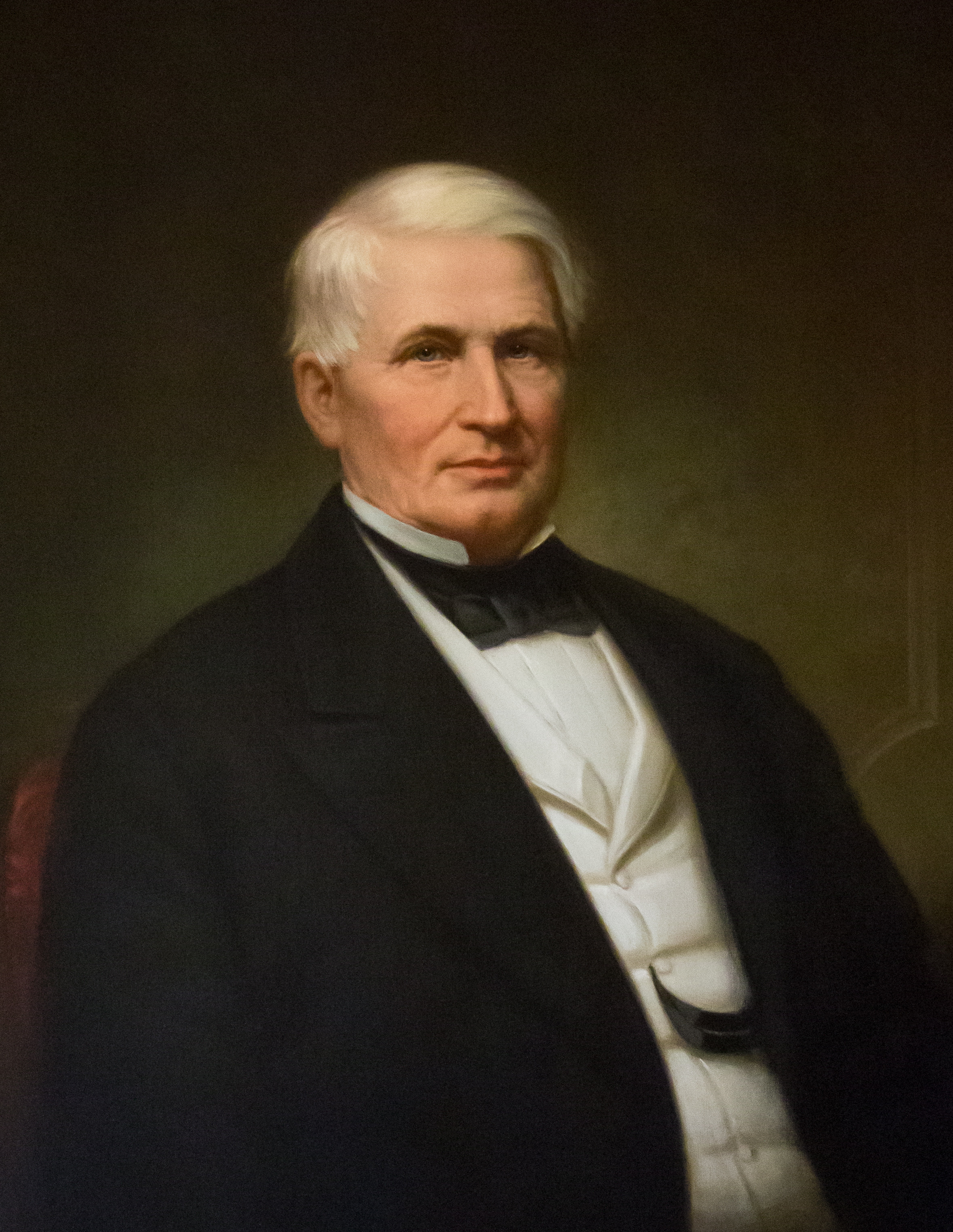
- Official portrait in the Rhode Island State House by James Sullivan Lincoln

31st Governor of Rhode Island
- In office May 25, 1869 – May 27, 1873
- Lieutenant: Pardon Stevens; Charles Cutler
- Preceded by: Ambrose Burnside
- Succeeded by: Henry Howard

Lieutenant Governor of Rhode Island
- In office 1863–1865
- Governor: James Y. Smith
- Preceded by: Samuel G. Arnold
- Succeeded by: Duncan Pell

Member of the Rhode Island House of Representatives

Personal details
- Born: October 3, 1807 Taunton, Massachusetts, U.S.
- Died: August 26, 1878 (aged 70) Providence, Rhode Island, U.S.
- Resting place: Swan Point Cemetery
- Party: Republican
- Profession: Politician

Seth Padelford (October 3, 1807 – August 26, 1878) was the 31st governor of Rhode Island from 1869 to 1873.

== Biography ==
Padelford was born in Taunton, Massachusetts. He worked as a grocer, as well as serving on the City Council of Providence, Rhode Island, the Providence School Committee and in the Rhode Island House of Representatives.

Padelford was a Unitarian and an ardent abolitionist with ties to the New England Emigrant Aid Company, which armed and organized settlers who took part in the "Bleeding Kansas" conflict. In 1860, he was nominated as the Republican Party candidate for Governor of Rhode Island. Anti-war Republicans and textile interests joined Democrats to back the young William Sprague IV, the nephew of former Rhode Island Governor and Senator William Sprague III. Sprague, running as a "Conservative" against Padelford's "Radical" candidacy, won the election by a margin of 12,278 to 10,740 votes, with twice the customary turnout at the polls.

After the American Civil War began in 1861, Padelford won two consecutive elections for Lieutenant Governor, serving from 1863 to 1865. He was elected Governor in 1869, serving four terms before stepping down.

Padelford died in 1878 in Providence, and is buried in Swan Point Cemetery.

== Family ==
- John Peirce, step-son - participated in the development of the telephone.

Party political offices
Preceded by Thomas G. Turner	Republican nominee for Governor of Rhode Island; 1860	Succeeded by James Y. Smith
Preceded by Ambrose Burnside	Republican nominee for Governor of Rhode Island; 1869, 1870, 1871, 1872	Succeeded by Henry Howard
Political offices
Preceded by Samuel G. Arnold	Lieutenant Governor of Rhode Island; 1863–1865	Succeeded by Duncan Pell
Preceded by Ambrose Burnside	Governor of Rhode Island; 1869–1873	Succeeded by Henry Howard
