= 1853 Rhode Island gubernatorial election =

- April 6, 1853
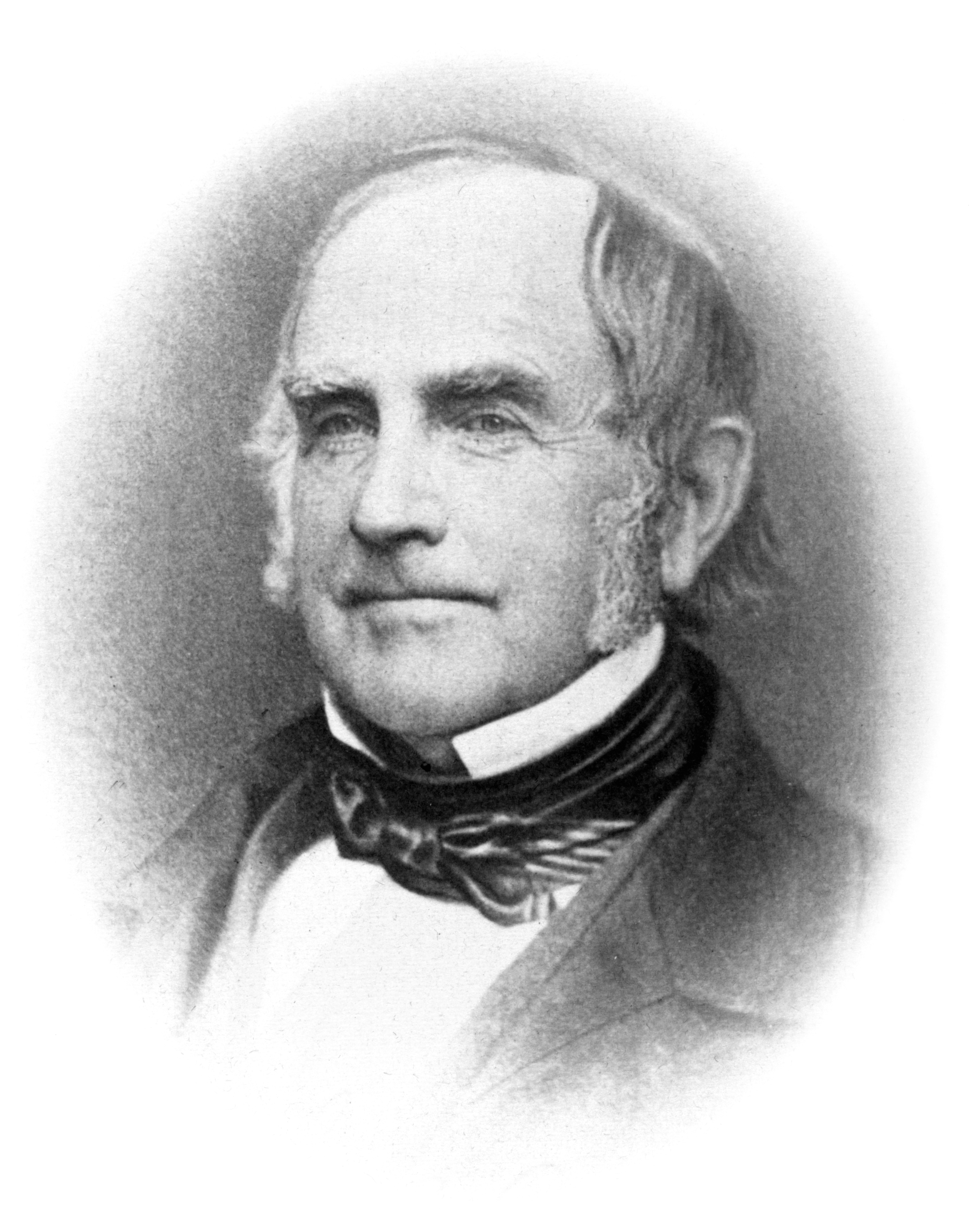

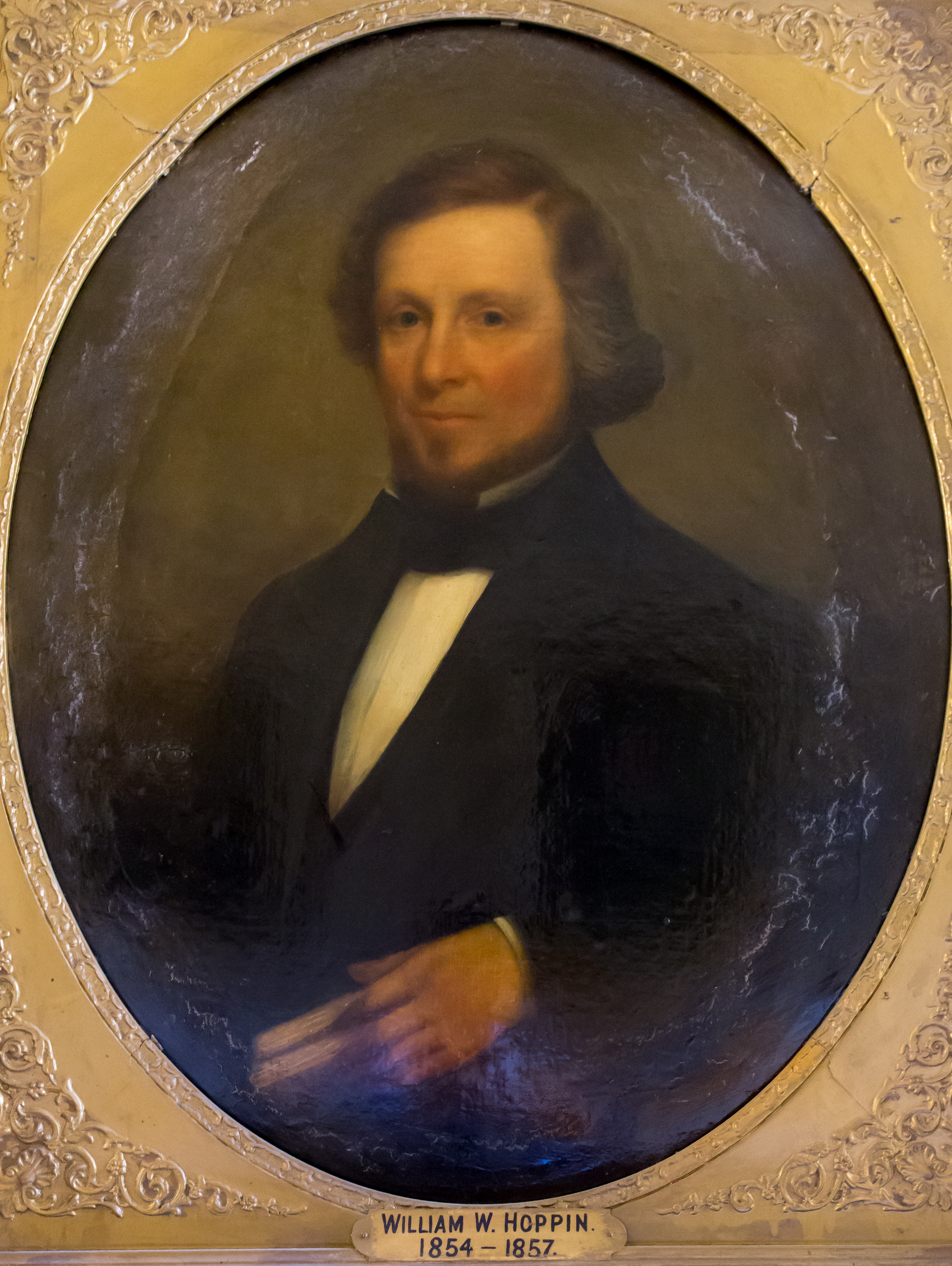

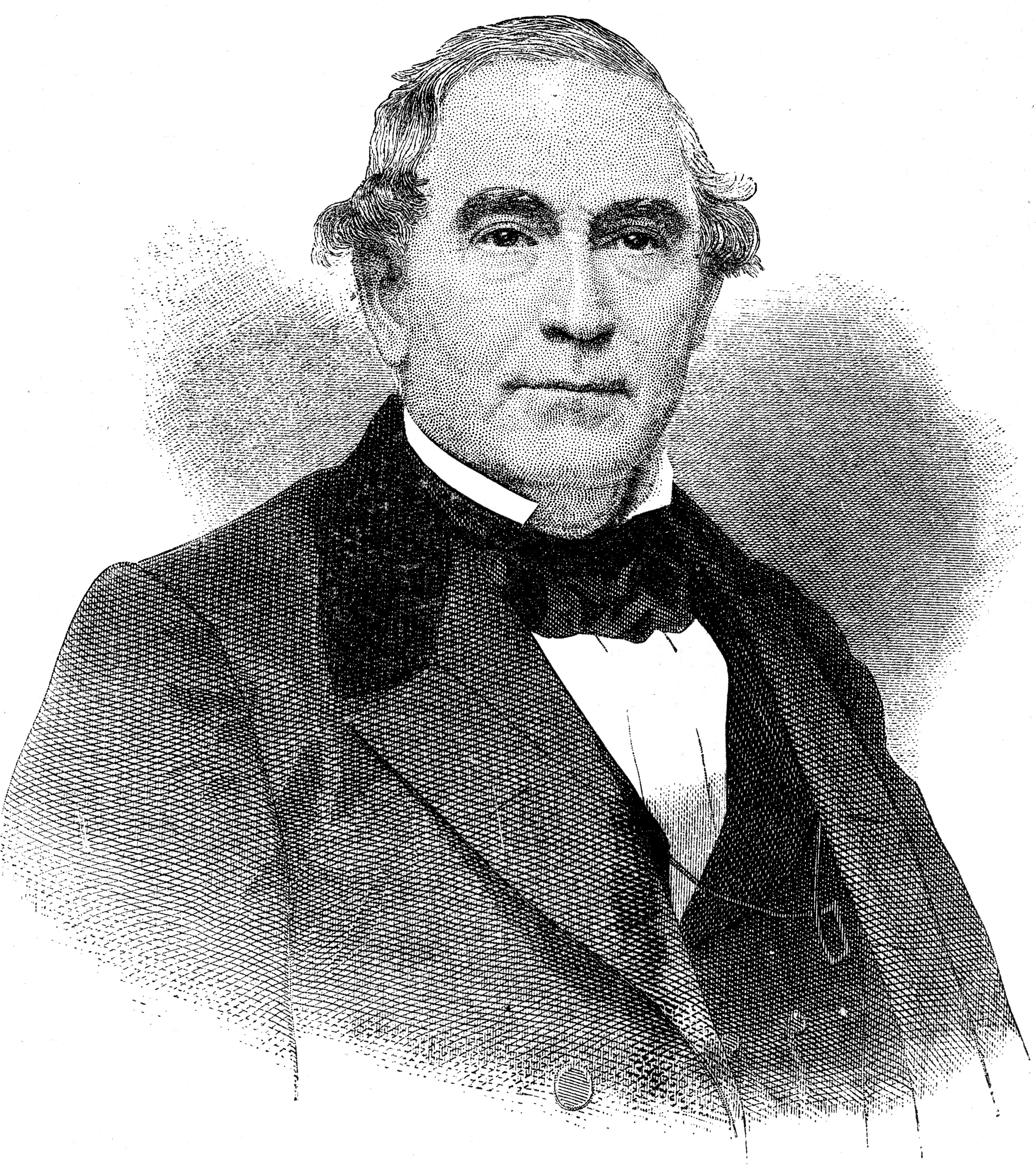
Nominee	Philip Allen	William W. Hoppin	Edward Harris
Party	Democratic	Whig	Free Soil
Popular vote	10,471	8,228	542
Percentage	54.40%	42.75%	2.82%
- County results Allen: 50–60% Hoppin: 50–60%
Governor before election
Philip Allen
Democratic
Elected Governor
Philip Allen
Democratic

The 1853 Rhode Island gubernatorial election was held on April 6, 1853, in order to elect the governor of Rhode Island. Incumbent Democratic governor Philip Allen won re-election against Whig nominee William W. Hoppin and Free Soil nominee Edward Harris.

== General election ==
On election day, April 6, 1853, incumbent Democratic governor Philip Allen won re-election by a margin of 2,243 votes against his foremost opponent William W. Hoppin, thereby keeping democratic control over the office of governor. Free Soil nominee Edward Harris also was unable to be elected as governor for the fourth time, after his election losses in the gubernatorial elections of 1849, 1850 and 1851. Allen was sworn in for his third term on May 6, 1853.

=== Results ===
Rhode Island gubernatorial election, 1853
Party	Candidate	Votes	%
Democratic	Philip Allen (incumbent)	10,471	54.40
Whig	William W. Hoppin	8,228	42.75
Free Soil	Edward Harris	542	2.82
Scattering		7	0.03
Total votes		19,248	100.00
Democratic hold			
