= 1854 Rhode Island gubernatorial election =

← 1853	April 5, 1854	1855 →
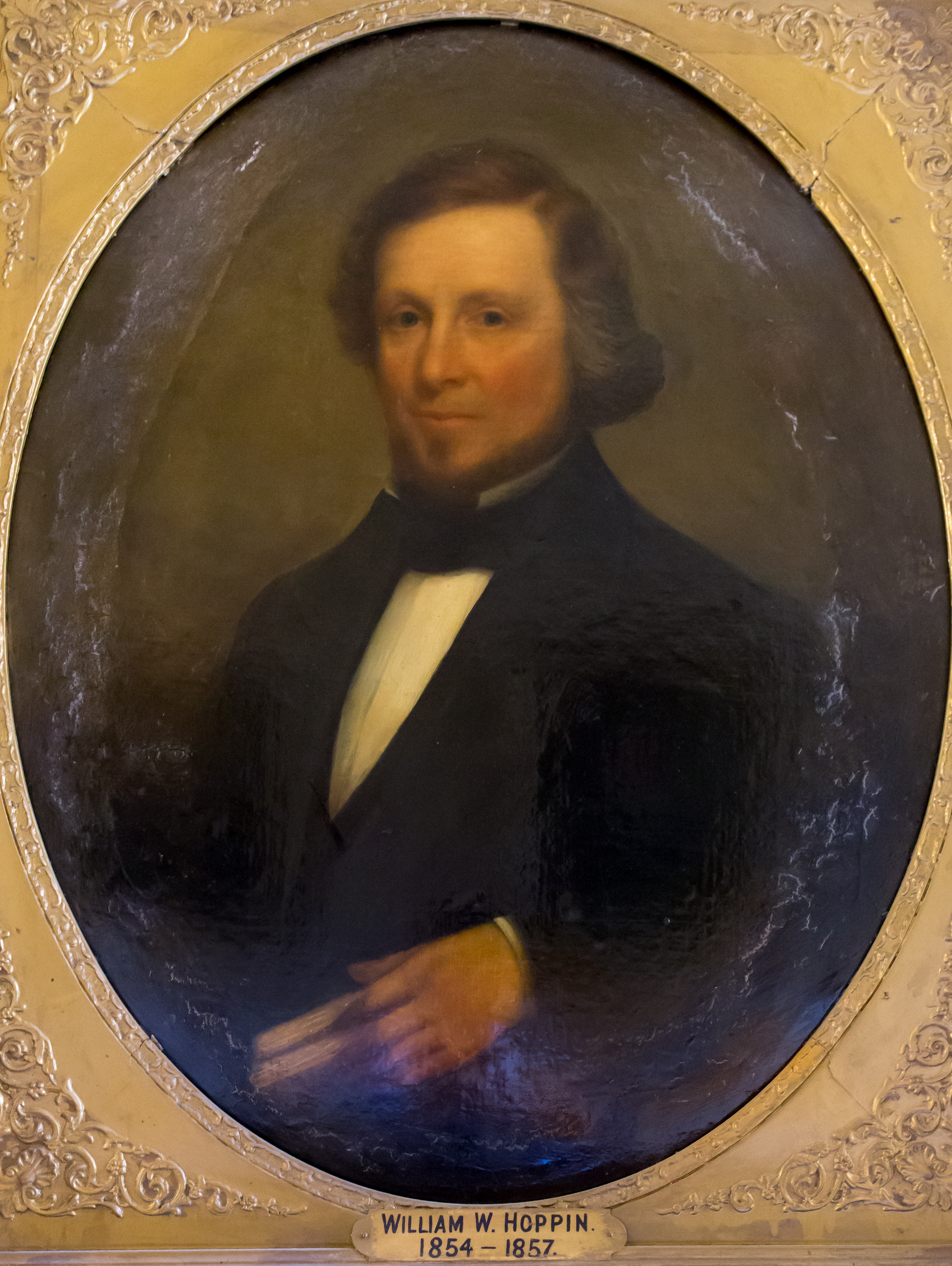

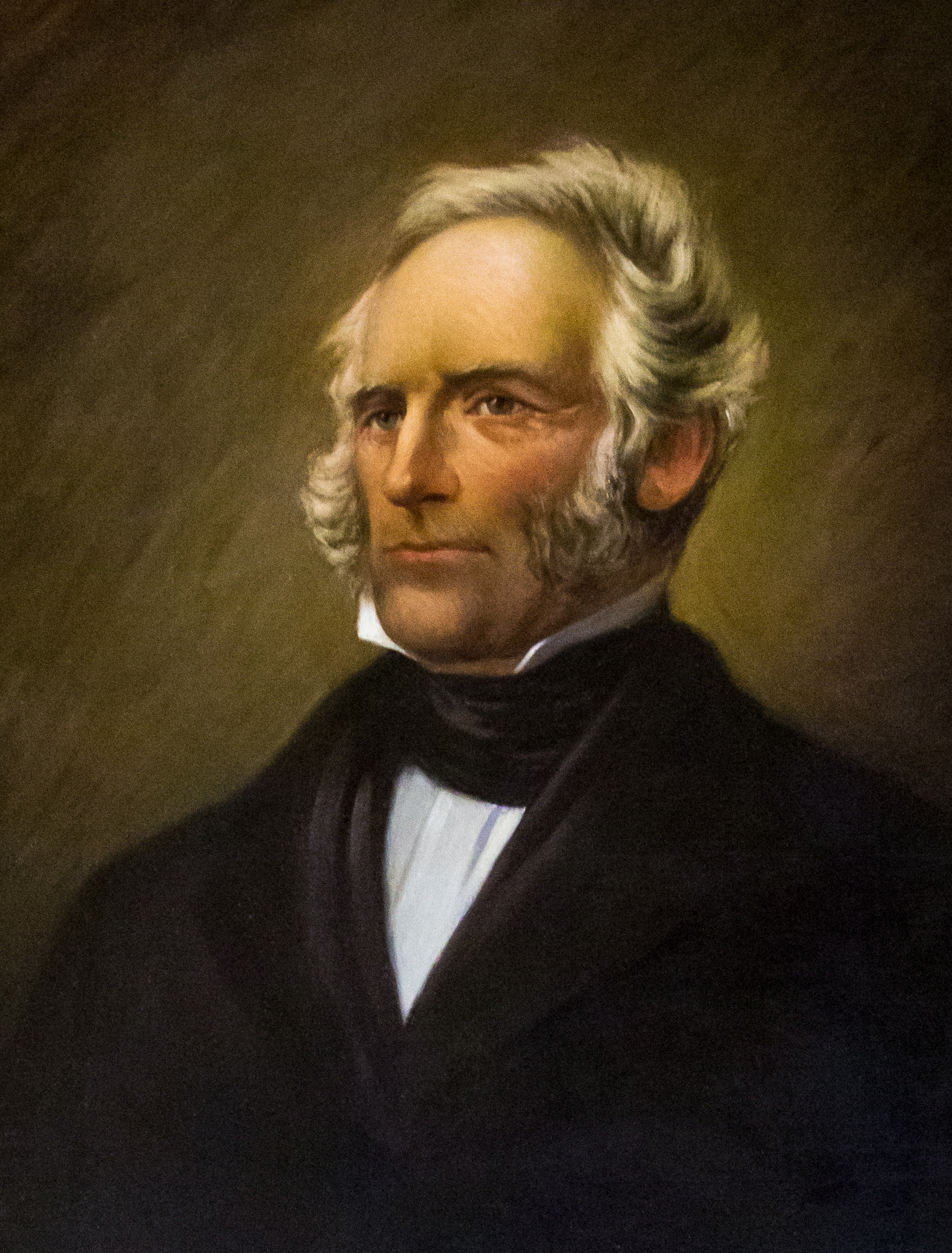
Nominee	William W. Hoppin	Francis M. Dimond
Party	Whig	Democratic
Popular vote	9,216	6,523
Percentage	57.76%	40.88%
- County results Hoppin: 50–60% 60–70%
Governor before election
Francis M. Dimond
Democratic
Elected Governor
William W. Hoppin
Whig

The 1854 Rhode Island gubernatorial election was held on April 5, 1854, in order to elect the governor of Rhode Island. Incumbent Democratic governor Francis M. Dimond was defeated by Whig nominee William W. Hoppin.

== General election ==
Following the resignation of Governor Philip Allen in order to become a United States senator on July 20, 1853, Lieutenant Governor Francis M. Dimond succeeded him and became the democratic nominee in the 1854 gubernatorial election so he could be elected to a full term. Meanwhile, the Whig party again nominated William W. Hoppin, who had sought the governorship before during the gubernatorial election of 1853, but had lost to incumbent governor Philip Allen. On election day, April 5, 1854, incumbent Democratic governor Francis M. Dimond was defeated by a margin of 2,693 votes against his Whig opponent William W. Hoppin, thereby losing democratic control over the office of governor to the Whig party. Hoppin was sworn in as the 24th governor of Rhode Island on May 2, 1854.

=== Results ===
Rhode Island gubernatorial election, 1854
Party	Candidate	Votes	%
Whig	William W. Hoppin	9,216	57.76
Democratic	Francis M. Dimond (incumbent)	6,523	40.88
Scattering		217	1.36
Total votes		15,956	100.00
Whig gain from Democratic			
