= 1851 Rhode Island gubernatorial election =

- April 2, 1851
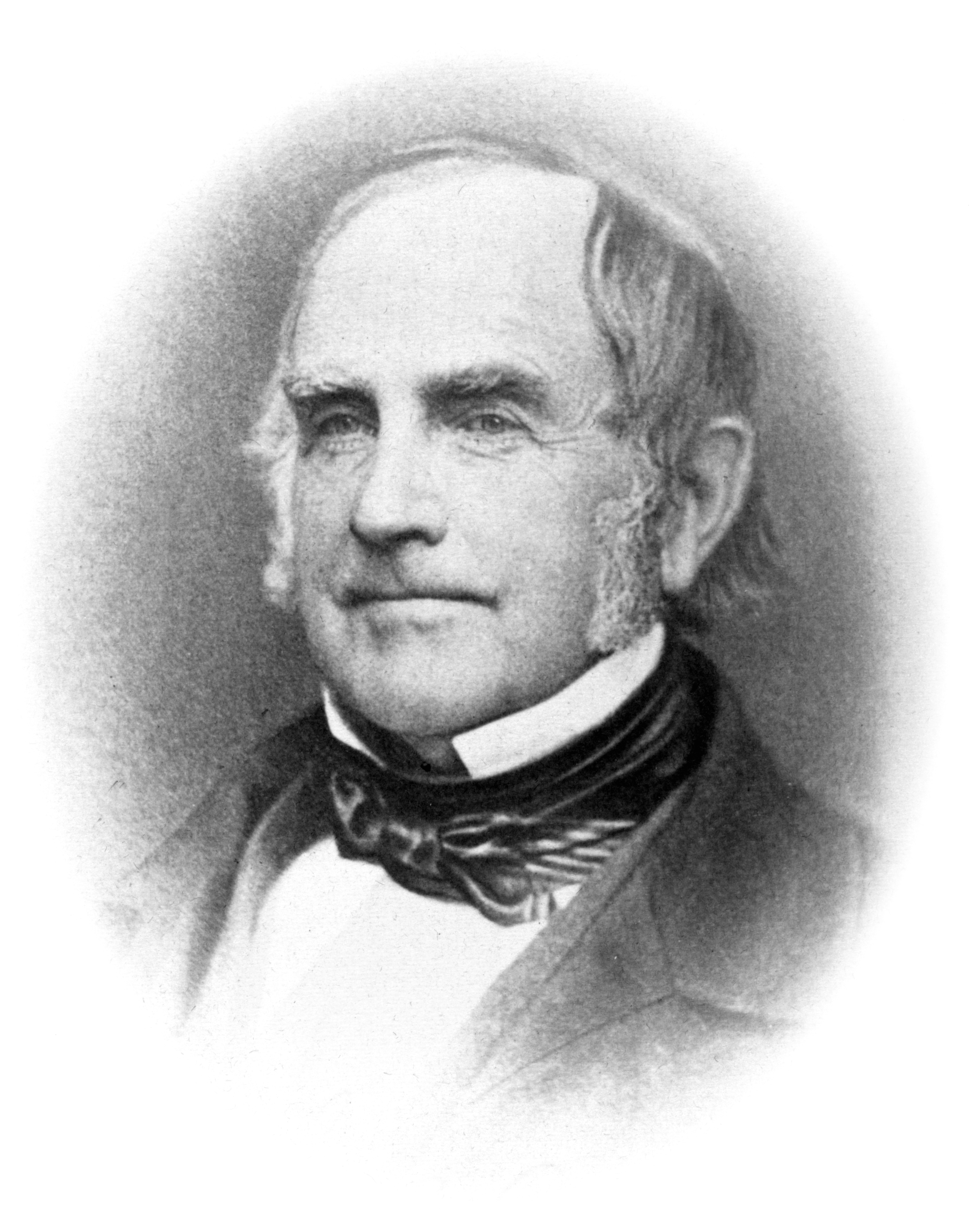

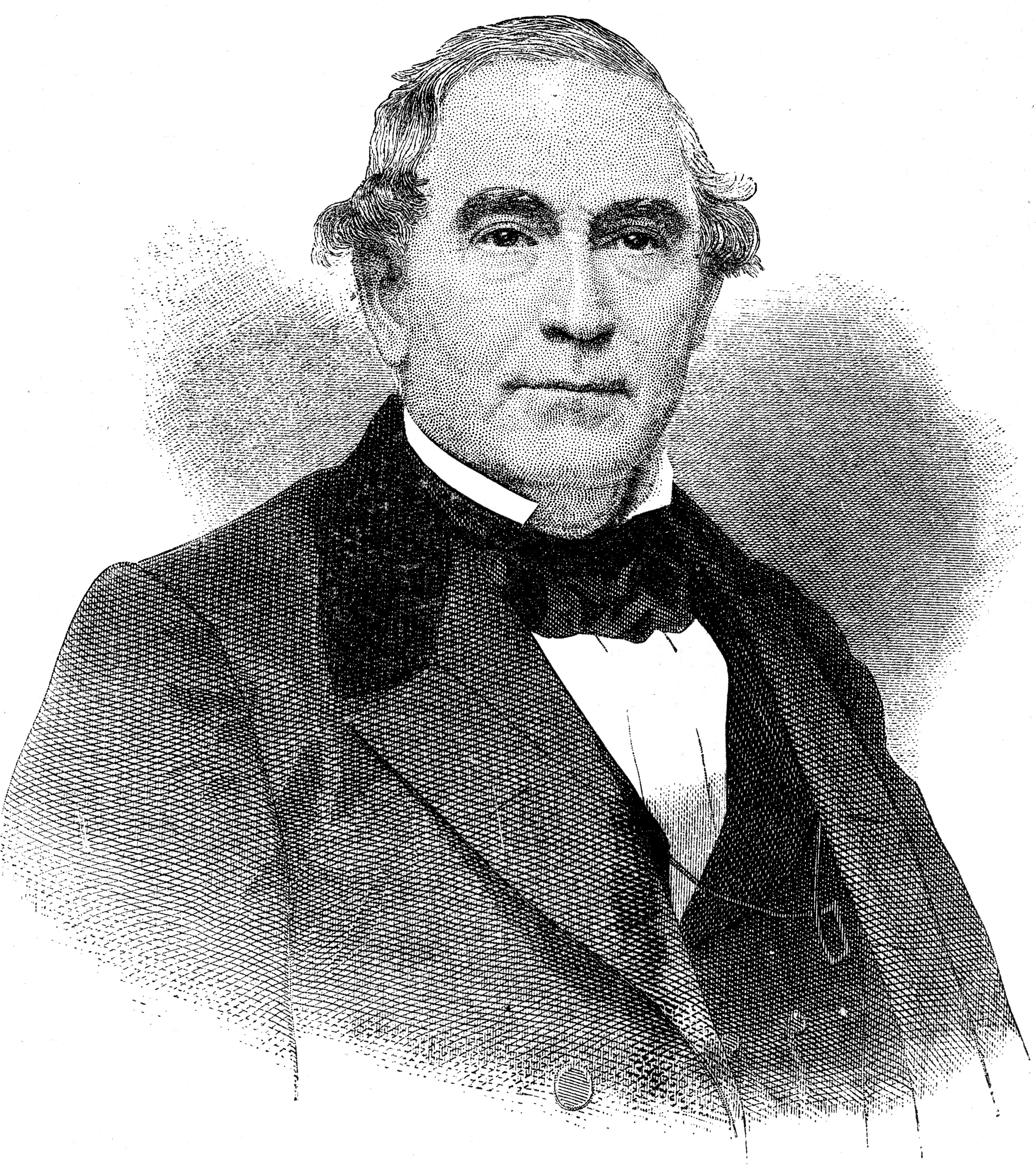
Nominee	Philip Allen	Josiah Chapin	Edward Harris
Party	Democratic	Whig	Free Soil
Popular vote	6,935	6,106	184
Percentage	52.37%	46.11%	1.39%
- County results Allen: 50–60% Chapin: 50–60% 60–70%
Governor before election
Henry B. Anthony
Whig
Elected Governor
Philip Allen
Democratic

The 1851 Rhode Island gubernatorial election was held on April 2, 1851, in order to elect the governor of Rhode Island. Democratic nominee and former member of the Rhode Island House of Representatives Philip Allen defeated Whig nominee Josiah Chapin and Free Soil nominee Edward Harris.

== General election ==
Incumbent Whig governor Henry B. Anthony declined to seek re-election to a third term, so his party instead nominated Josiah Chapin in order to keep the office of governor under Whig control. Meanwhile Free Soil candidate Edward Harris was nominated for a third consecutive time after his election losses during the 1849 and 1850 Rhode Island gubernatorial election. On election day, April 2, 1851, democratic nominee Philip Allen won the election by a margin of 829 votes against his foremost opponent Josiah Chapin. Allen was sworn in as the 22nd governor of Rhode Island on May 6, 1851.

=== Results ===
Rhode Island gubernatorial election, 1851
Party	Candidate	Votes	%
Democratic	Philip Allen	6,935	52.37
Whig	Josiah Chapin	6,106	46.11
Free Soil	Edward Harris	184	1.39
Scattering		17	0.13
Total votes		13,242	100.00
Democratic gain from Whig			
