= 1857 Rhode Island gubernatorial election =

- April 1, 1857
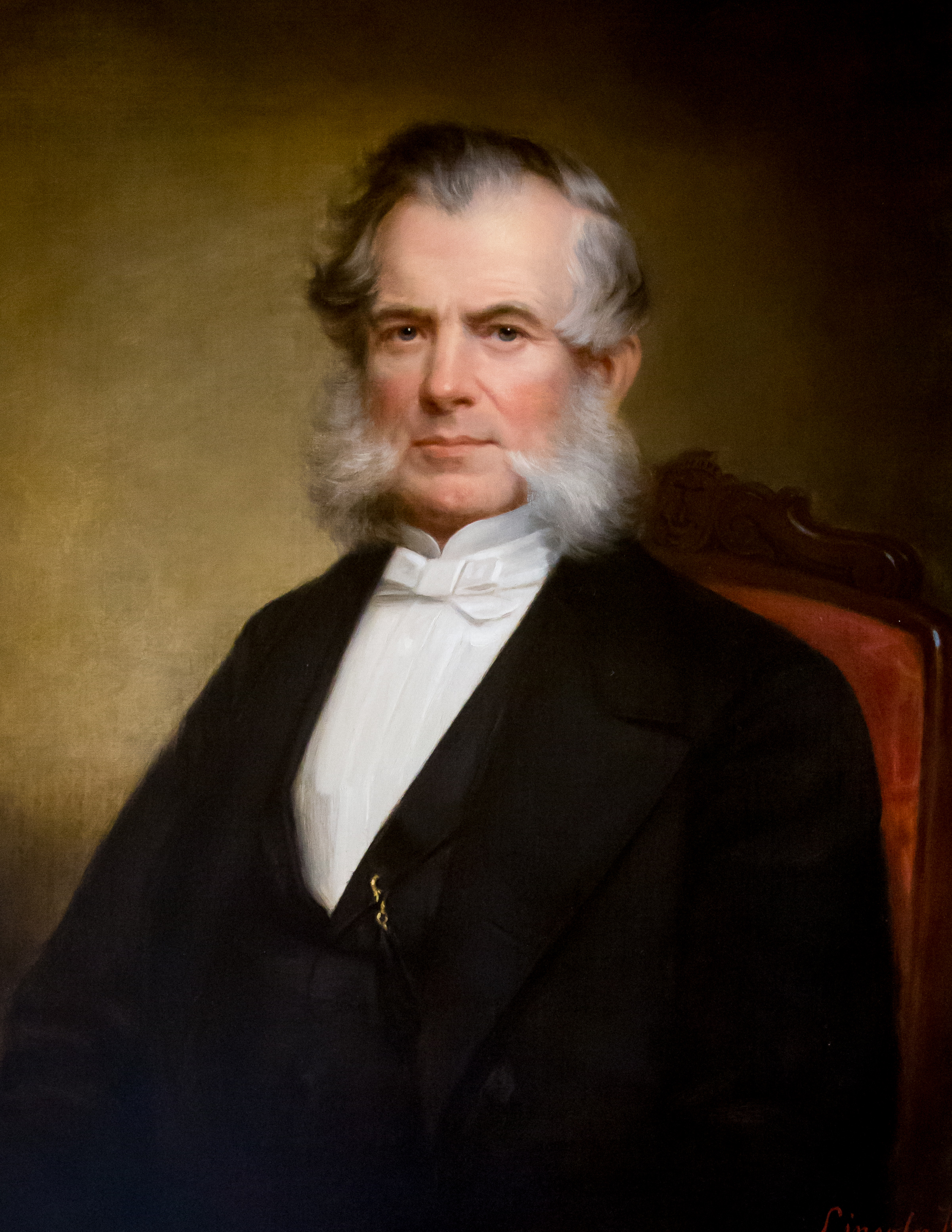

Nominee	Elisha Dyer	Americus V. Potter
Party	Republican	Democratic
Popular vote	9,591	5,323
Percentage	64.23%	35.65%
- County results Dyer: 50–60% 60–70%
Governor before election
William W. Hoppin
Republican
Elected Governor
Elisha Dyer
Republican

The 1857 Rhode Island gubernatorial election was held on April 1, 1857, in order to elect the governor of Rhode Island. Republican nominee Elisha Dyer defeated Democratic nominee Americus V. Potter.

== General election ==
The Democratic party nominated Americus V. Potter for a third consecutive time following his election losses in the 1855 and 1856 Rhode Island gubernatorial election. On election day, April 1, 1857, Republican nominee Elisha Dyer won the election by a margin of 4,268 votes against his Democratic opponent Americus V. Potter, thereby retaining Republican control over the office of governor. Dyer was sworn in as the 25th governor of Rhode Island on May 26, 1857.

=== Results ===
Rhode Island gubernatorial election, 1857
Party	Candidate	Votes	%
Republican	Elisha Dyer	9,591	64.23
Democratic	Americus V. Potter	5,323	35.65
Scattering		18	0.12
Total votes		14,932	100.00
Republican hold			
