= Dyerville Mill =

- U.S. National Register of Historic Places
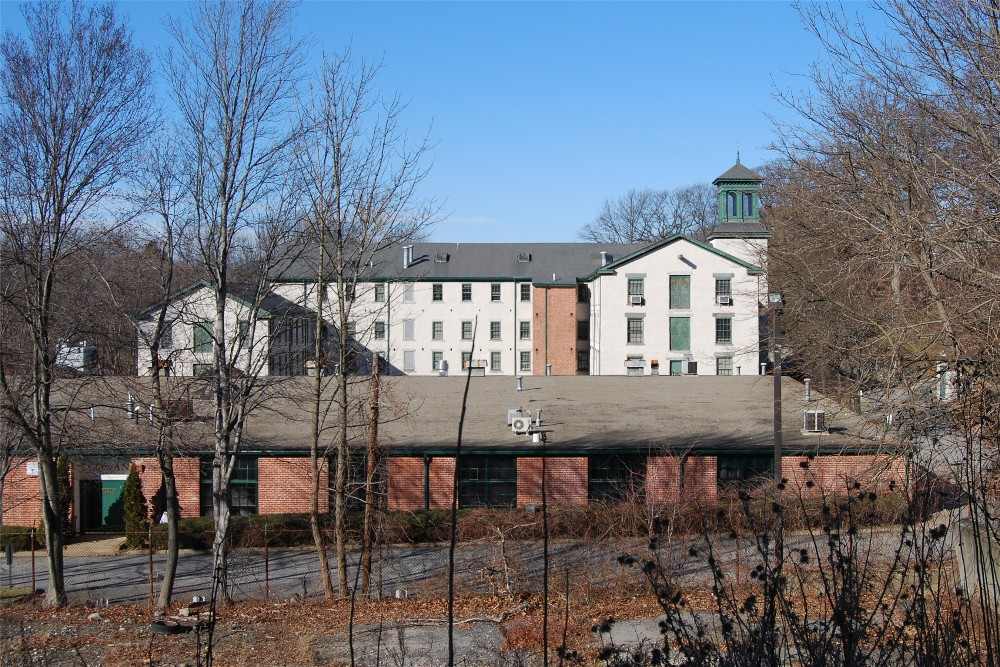

- Location within Rhode Island Location within the United States
- Location: Providence, Rhode Island
- Coordinates: 41°49′35″N 71°27′42″W
- Built: 1835
- NRHP reference No.: 79000055
- Added to NRHP: June 18, 1979

The Dyerville Mill is an historic textile mill complex at 610 Manton Avenue in Providence, Rhode Island, USA. Its oldest buildings dating to 1835, it is one of the oldest textile mills in the city. The complex is located between Manton Avenue and the Woonasquatucket River, just south of the Dyerville Mill Pond. Remnants of the head race run south from the pond, through the property, with the tail race exiting to the southwest. The main mill building is a 3 1/2-story L-shaped stuccoed stone structure. The picker house is a 2 1/2-story stone structure southwest of the main mill, with a brick extension that also gives it an L shape and creates a courtyard with the main building. A 20th-century warehouse stands south of this complex. The mill was established by Elisha Dyer, father of Elisha Dyer and grandfather of Elisha Dyer, Jr., and was operated by the Dyer family until 1867. It was then operated by cotton broker Truman Beckwith and his son. The Joslin Manufacturing Company purchased the business in 1903 and operated textile production on the site until the 1930s. The site has thereafter seen other light industrial uses.

The mill was listed on the National Register of Historic Places in 1979.

The building is now home to The Groden Network of Services.

== See also ==
- National Register of Historic Places listings in Providence, Rhode Island
