= 1856 Rhode Island gubernatorial election =

- April 2, 1856
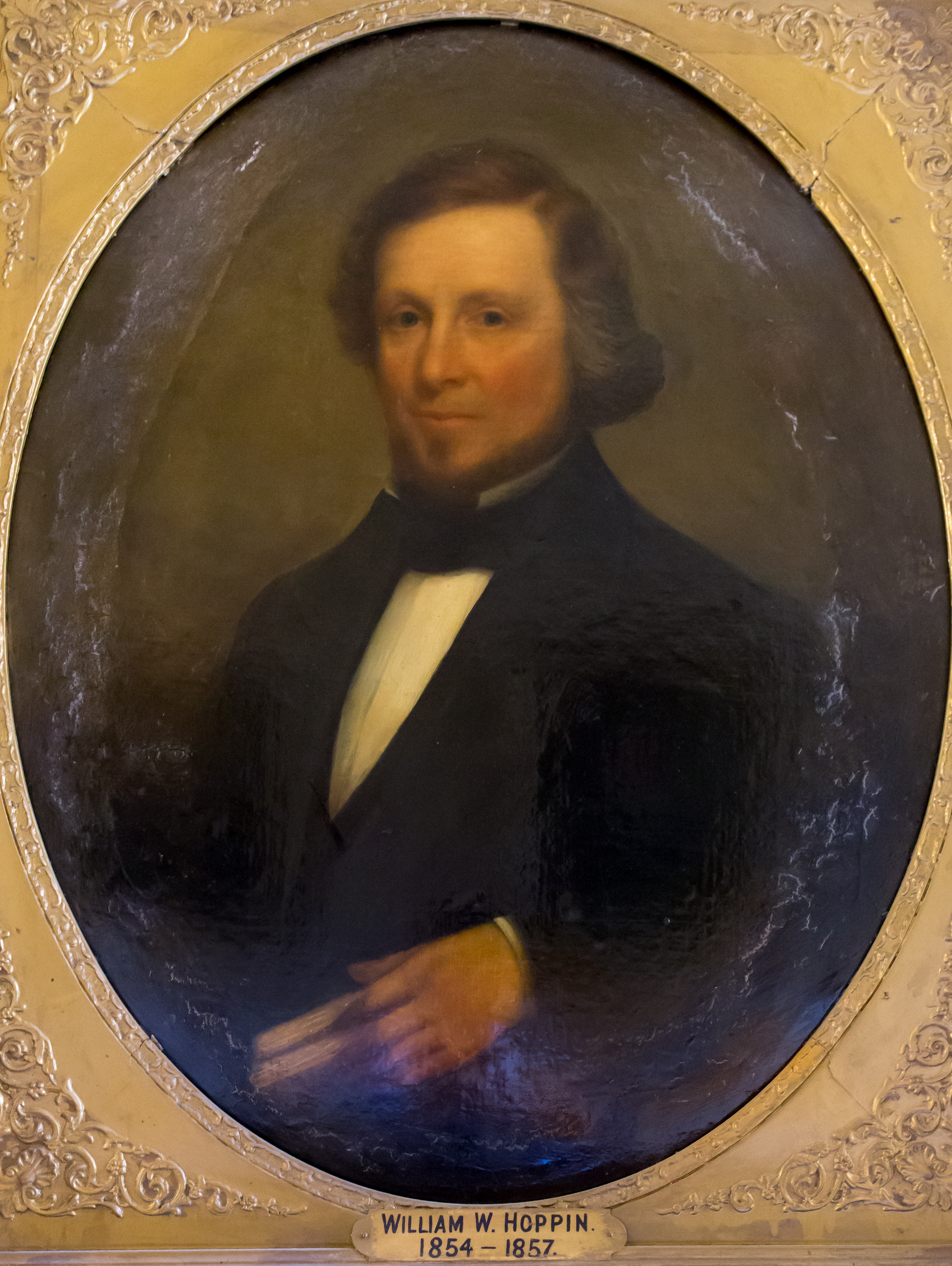

Nominee	William W. Hoppin	Americus V. Potter
Party	Republican	Democratic
Popular vote	9,865	7,131
Percentage	57.95%	41.89%
- County results Hoppin: 50–60% 60–70%
Governor before election
William W. Hoppin
Republican
Elected Governor
William W. Hoppin
Republican

The 1856 Rhode Island gubernatorial election was held on April 2, 1856, to elect the governor of Rhode Island. Incumbent Republican governor William W. Hoppin won re-election over Democratic nominee Americus V. Potter in a rematch from the 1855 Rhode Island gubernatorial election.

== General election ==
Incumbent Whig governor William W. Hoppin had changed parties before the election and instead joined the Republican party, by being the incumbent governor, Hoppin's quickly became the Republican nominee for re-election. On election day, April 2, 1856, incumbent Republican governor William W. Hoppin won reelection by a margin of 2,734 votes against his Democratic opponent Americus V. Potter, thereby retaining Republican control over the office of governor. Hoppin was sworn in for his third term on May 26, 1856.

=== Results ===
Rhode Island gubernatorial election, 1856
Party	Candidate	Votes	%
Republican	William W. Hoppin (incumbent)	9,865	57.95
Democratic	Americus V. Potter	7,131	41.89
Scattering		27	0.16
Total votes		17,023	100.00
Republican hold			
