= 1850 Rhode Island gubernatorial election =

- April 3, 1850
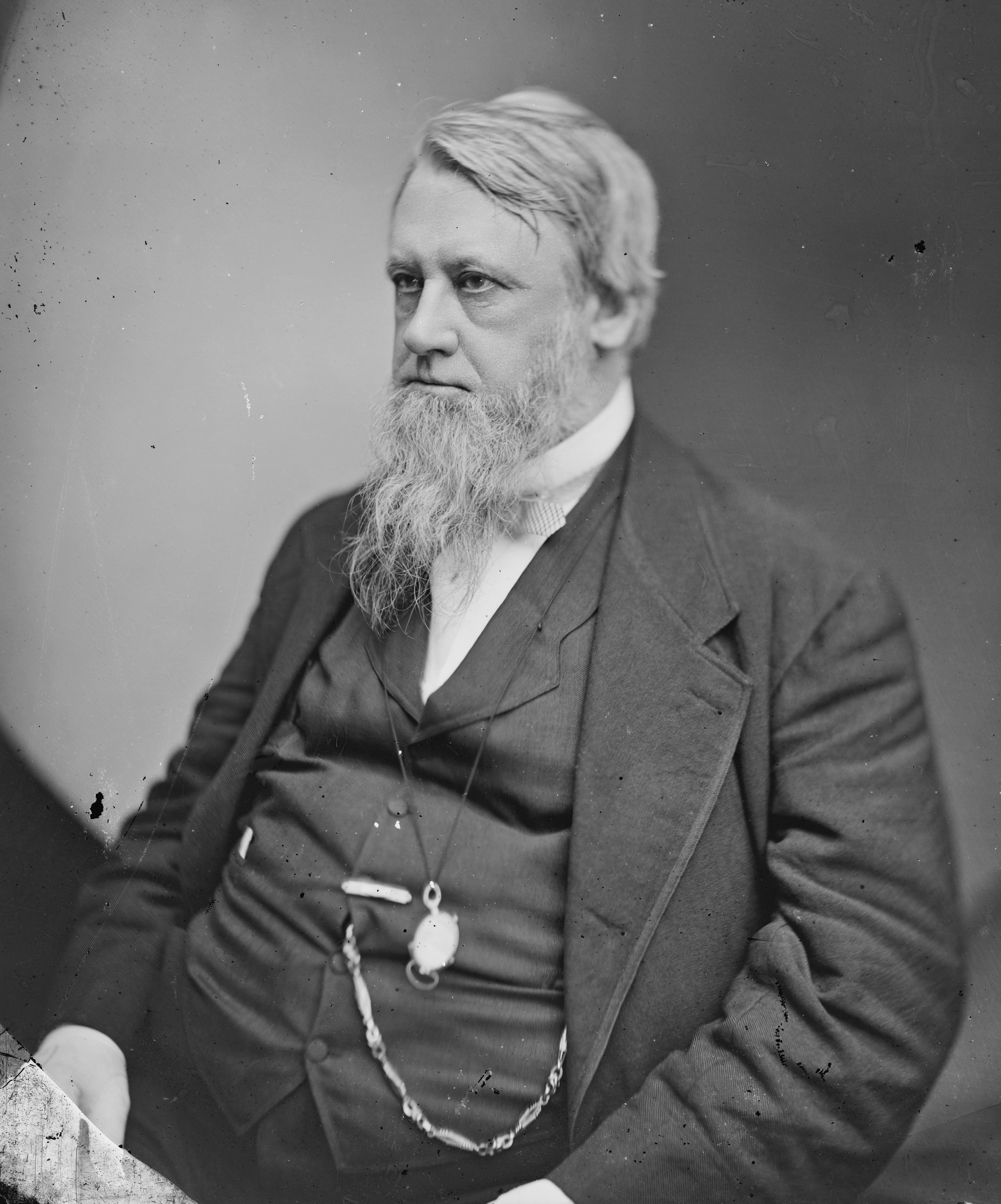

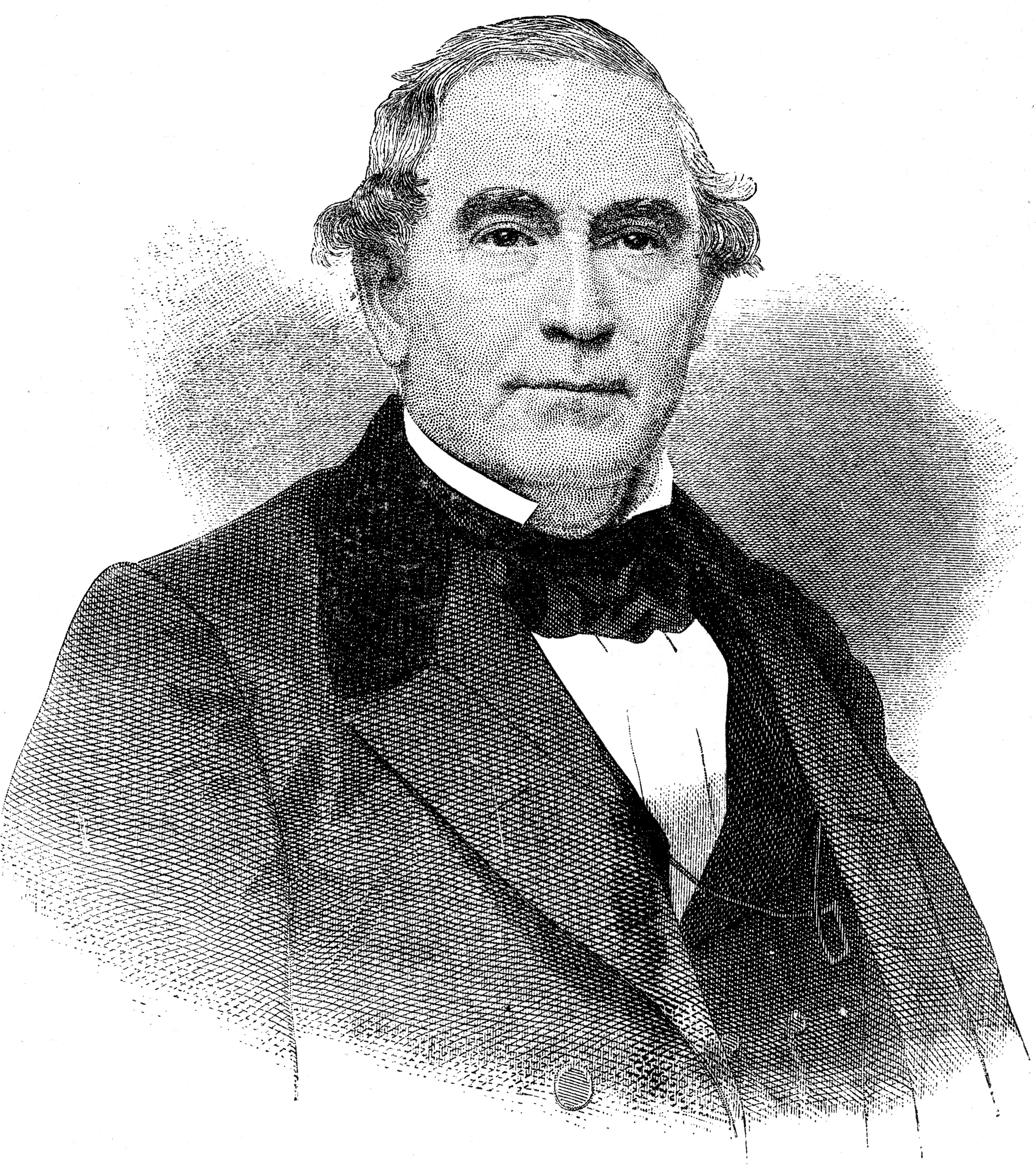
Nominee	Henry B. Anthony	Edward Harris
Party	Whig	Free Soil
Popular vote	3,668	773
Percentage	80.16%	16.89%
- County results Anthony: 70–80% 80–90% 90–100%
Governor before election
Henry B. Anthony
Whig
Elected Governor
Henry B. Anthony
Whig

The 1850 Rhode Island gubernatorial election was held on April 3, 1850, in order to elect the governor of Rhode Island. Incumbent Whig governor Henry B. Anthony won re-election against the Free Soil nominee Edward Harris in a rematch from the 1849 Rhode Island gubernatorial election.

== General election ==
On election day, April 3, 1850, Henry B. Anthony won re-election by a margin of 2,895 votes against his opponent Edward Harris. Defeating Harris for a second time after Anthony's first election as governor during the 1849 Rhode Island gubernatorial election. Retaining whig control of the office of governor and being sworn in for his second term on May 6, 1850.

=== Results ===
Rhode Island gubernatorial election, 1850
Party	Candidate	Votes	%
Whig	Henry B. Anthony (incumbent)	3,668	80.16
Free Soil	Edward Harris	773	16.89
	Scattering	135	2.95
Total votes		4,576	100.00
Whig hold			
