= Samuel G. Arnold =

American politician (1821–1880)

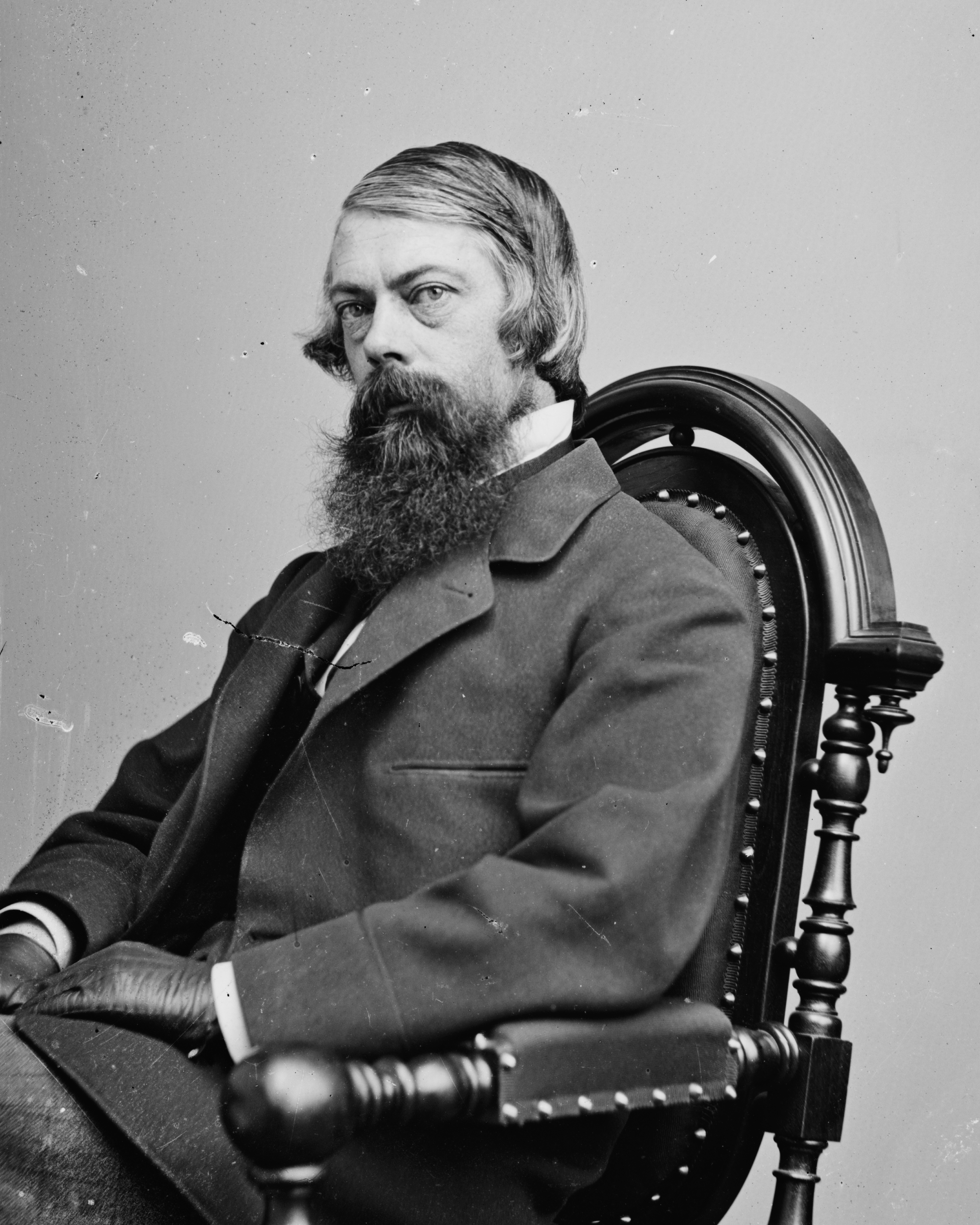
- Arnold, 1855–1865

United States Senator from Rhode Island
- In office December 1, 1862 – March 3, 1863
- Preceded by: James F. Simmons
- Succeeded by: William Sprague

6th and 14th Lieutenant Governor of Rhode Island
- In office May 1861 – December 1862
- Governor: William Sprague IV
- Preceded by: J. Russell Bullock
- Succeeded by: Seth Padelford
- In office May 1852 – May 1853
- Governor: Philip Allen
- Preceded by: William B. Lawrence
- Succeeded by: Francis M. Dimond

Personal details
- Born: April 12, 1821 Providence, Rhode Island, U.S.
- Died: February 14, 1880 (aged 58) Providence, Rhode Island, U.S.
- Resting place: Swan Point Cemetery, Providence, Rhode Island
- Party: Whig (before 1854); Republican (from 1854)
- Spouse: Louisa Gindrat Arnold (1828–1905)
- Relations: Welcome Arnold (grandfather); Theodore Francis Green (grandnephew)
- Children: 3
- Education: Brown University; Harvard University
- Profession: Attorney

Samuel Greene Arnold Jr. (April 12, 1821 – February 14, 1880) was an American attorney and politician from Rhode Island. A Republican, he was most notable for his service as lieutenant governor and as a United States senator.

== Early life ==
Born in Providence, Arnold received his early education under private tutors, then graduated from Brown University in 1841 and Harvard Law School in 1845. He was admitted to the bar in 1845, and practiced in Providence. He was also a historian, and he served as a trustee of Brown University from 1848 to 1880.

== Career ==
Arnold was elected Lieutenant Governor of Rhode Island in 1852 and served as acting governor. In 1859, he was elected an Associate Fellow of the American Academy of Arts and Sciences, where he wrote the two-volume History of the State of Rhode Island and Providence Plantations in 1859. He was a member of the peace commission held at Washington, D.C., in 1861 in an effort to prevent the impending civil war.

In March 1861, Arnold was again elected lieutenant governor after being nominated by the Constitutional Union and Democratic Conventions. He was again elected lieutenant governor in 1862.

Shortly after the outbreak of the Civil War, Arnold was appointed as a military aide to Governor William Sprague with rank of colonel, and he raised the 1st Rhode Island Battery of light artillery, which went to Washington, D.C., and was mustered into the Union Army for three months.

He was elected as a Republican to the U.S. Senate to fill the vacancy caused by the resignation of James F. Simmons, and he served from December 1, 1862, to March 3, 1863. After his time in the Senate, he returned to historical research and was president of the Rhode Island Historical Society from 1868 to 1880. He died in Providence on February 13, 1880; interment was in Swan Point Cemetery.

== Family ==
He married his cousin Louisa Gindrat Arnold (1828–1905), the daughter of his father's uncle Richard J. Arnold (1796–1873). He wrote, "I have brought up my cousin for years to make her my wife, for I am so fastidious and particular on that matter that I knew I never should find a lady to suit me in all respects unless I educated her for the purpose. This is an original idea to be sure."

Arnold's grandnephew Theodore Francis Green was also a U.S. Senator from Rhode Island.

Political offices
Preceded by William B. Lawrence	Lieutenant Governor of Rhode Island; 1852–1853	Succeeded by Francis M. Dimond
Preceded by J. Russell Bullock	Lieutenant Governor of Rhode Island; 1861–1862	Succeeded by Seth Padelford
U.S. Senate
Preceded by James F. Simmons	U.S. senator (Class 1) from Rhode Island; December 1, 1862 – March 3, 1863; Served alongside: Henry B. Anthony	Succeeded by William Sprague IV
