= James Mason Hoppin =

American educator and writer (1820–1906)

James Mason Hoppin D.D.
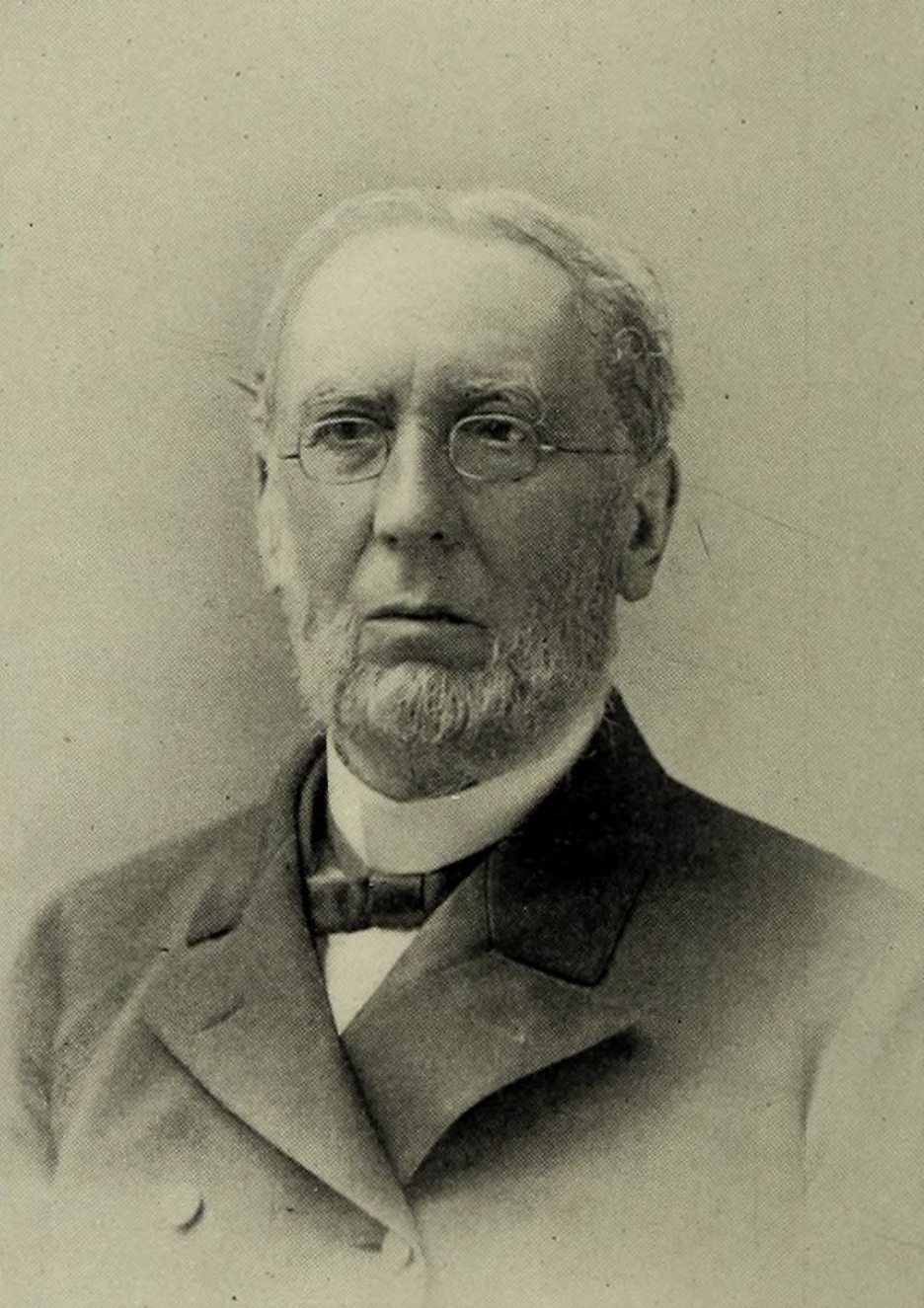
- Born: January 17, 1820; Providence, Rhode Island, US
- Died: November 15, 1906 (aged 86); New Haven, Connecticut, US
- Education: Yale College, B.A. (1840); Harvard Law School, LL.B. (1842); Andover Theological Seminary (1845)
- Occupations: Educator, writer

James Mason Hoppin (January 17, 1820 – November 15, 1906) was an American educator and writer.

== Biography ==
James Mason Hoppin was born at Providence, Rhode Island on January 17, 1820, the brother of William Warner Hoppin. He graduated from Yale College in 1840 (where he was a member of Skull and Bones,) from Harvard Law School in 1842, and from Andover Theological Seminary in 1845. He studied for some time abroad; and was pastor of a Congregational church at Salem, Massachusetts from 1850 to 1859. From 1861 to 1879, he was professor of homiletics at Yale, where he was also professor of art history from 1879 to 1899, when he became professor emeritus. He was a member of the Connecticut Academy of Arts and Sciences and the American Philosophical Society.

His "Great Epochs in Art History" from 1901 was the subject of a scathing critique by painter and critic Roger Fry which was later quoted in Virginia Woolf’s biography of the latter, with his name miswritten as "Hopkins":

I’m just reviewing a book on great epochs of Art History by one Hoppin of Yale, the most amazing farrago of loose tidbits of information all muddled up in his stupid colourless brain and tumbling out anyhow. He's no conception of one thing being more important than another, of any standard or relation. He's equally interested in everything that has been said or can be said. It's the queerest mixture of childish incompetence and senile decay without a spark of feeling or perception and yet he's well read, deucedly so, only it’s made no difference to his native incapacity to understanding anything. Of such, I suppose, is the new Kingdom of Heaven they are preparing.

He died in New Haven, Connecticut on November 15, 1906, aged 86.

== Selected writings ==
- Old England: Its Art, Scenery, and People (1857)
- The Office and Work of the Christian Ministry (1869)
- Life of Rear-Admiral Andrew Hull Foote (1874)
- The Early Renaissance and Other Essays on Art Subjects (1892)
- Greek Art on Greek Soil (1897)
- The Reading of Shakespeare (1904)
