= William Beach Lawrence =

American politician

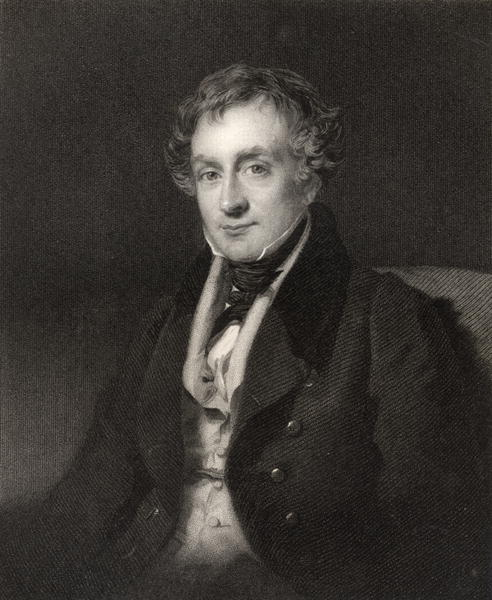
- Lawrence c. 1820

Acting United States Minister to the United Kingdom
- In office 1827–1828
- President: John Quincy Adams
- Preceded by: Albert Gallatin
- Succeeded by: James Barbour

Lieutenant Governor of Rhode Island
- In office 1851–1852
- Governor: Philip Allen
- Preceded by: Thomas Whipple
- Succeeded by: Samuel G. Arnold

Personal details
- Born: William Beach Lawrence; October 23, 1800 New York City, New York
- Died: March 26, 1881 (aged 80) New York City, New York
- Spouse: Esther Rogers Gracie (m. 1821; died 1857)
- Children: several, including Albert G. Lawrence
- Parents: Isaac Lawrence (father); Cornelia Ann Beach (mother)
- Relatives: Archibald Gracie (father-in-law)
- Education: Columbia College; Litchfield Law School

William Beach Lawrence (October 23, 1800 – March 26, 1881) was an American politician and jurist who served as lieutenant governor of Rhode Island from 1851 to 1852 under Governor Philip Allen.

== Early life ==
Lawrence was born in New York City to Isaac Lawrence (1768–1841) and Cornelia Ann Beach (1777–1857). A member of the Philolexian Society, he graduated from Columbia in 1818 and was admitted to the bar in 1823, after studying at Litchfield Law School.

== Career ==
In 1826, he was appointed Secretary of Legation for Great Britain, and was made chargé d'affaires the year after. When he returned to the United States in 1829 he practiced law with Hamilton Fish, and worked on the executive committee to promote the building of the Erie Railroad.

In 1850, Lawrence moved to Rhode Island and was elected as lieutenant-governor of that state the next year. He then became acting governor in 1852, and served in Rhode Island's constitutional convention as well. After his time in politics, he wrote essays and books about international law, and he argued a case before the United States Supreme Court in 1873. He also wrote a letter to the "Journal des Débats" in 1860 defending slavery for its uplifting of Black slaves under a superior race and criticized the French for their position on abolition by pointing to the imports that France, and the rest of the world, get in cotton from the United States. He became vice-president of the New York Historical Society in 1836.

== Personal life ==
In 1821, he married Esther Rogers Gracie (1801–1857), daughter of Archibald Gracie (1755–1829). Together, they had several children, including:

- William Lawrence (d. 1870), a lawyer
- Isaac Lawrence (1828–1919), a democratic candidate for Governor of Rhode Island in 1878
- Esther Gracie Lawrence (1872 Chicago - 1976 Hamburg), who first married Dr. W. L. Wheeler. She later married Count Felix Ludwig Eugen von Voß (1856 - 1931)-Gievitz of Mecklenburg-Schwerin. His mother was Elise Gräfin Szapáry c. Szapár (1827 - 1890)
- Albert Gallatin Lawrence (1836–1887), a Brigadier-General and Minister to Costa Rica, and who married Eveline McLean "Eva" Taylor (1845–1917), youngest daughter of Gen. Joseph Pannell Taylor and niece of President Taylor.
- Cornelia Beach Lawrence, who married Baron von Klenck, of Hanover, a decorated hero of the Franco-Prussian war.
- James G. K. Lawrence (1845-1895), who married Catherine Augusta Le Roy.

Lawrence died in March 1881 in New York City while seeking medical treatment.

== Works ==
- The Bank of the United States (1831)
- Institutions of the United States (1832)
- Discourses on Political Economy (1834)
- Biographical Memoir of Albert Gallatin (1843)
- The Law of Charitable Uses (1845)
- An annotated edition of Wheaton's Elements of International Law (1855)
- Visitation and Search (1858)
- Commentaire sur les éléments du droit international (four volumes, 1868–80)
- The Treaty of Washington (1871)
- Belligerent and Sovereign Rights as Regards Neutrals During the War of Secession (1873)
- Etudes sur la jurisdiction consulaire et sur l'extradition (1880)

Political offices
Preceded by Thomas Whipple	Lieutenant Governor of Rhode Island; 1851–1852	Succeeded by Samuel G. Arnold
