= Francis M. Dimond =

American politician (1796–1859)

Francis Dimond
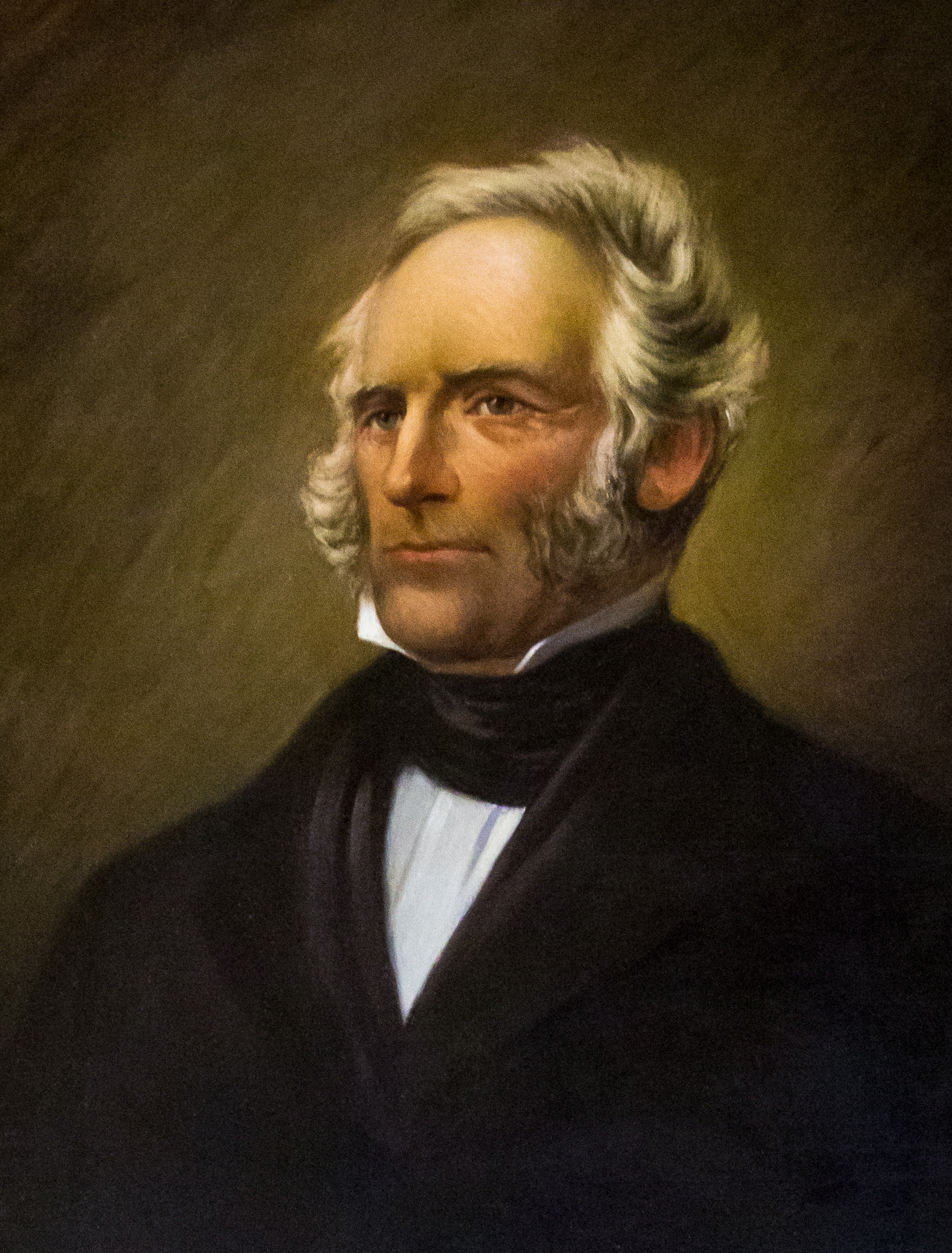

23rd Governor of Rhode Island
- In office July 20, 1853 – May 2, 1854
- Preceded by: Philip Allen
- Succeeded by: William W. Hoppin

Personal details
- Born: June 6, 1796 Bristol, Rhode Island, U.S.
- Died: April 12, 1859 (aged 62)
- Resting place: Juniper Hill Cemetery
- Party: Democratic

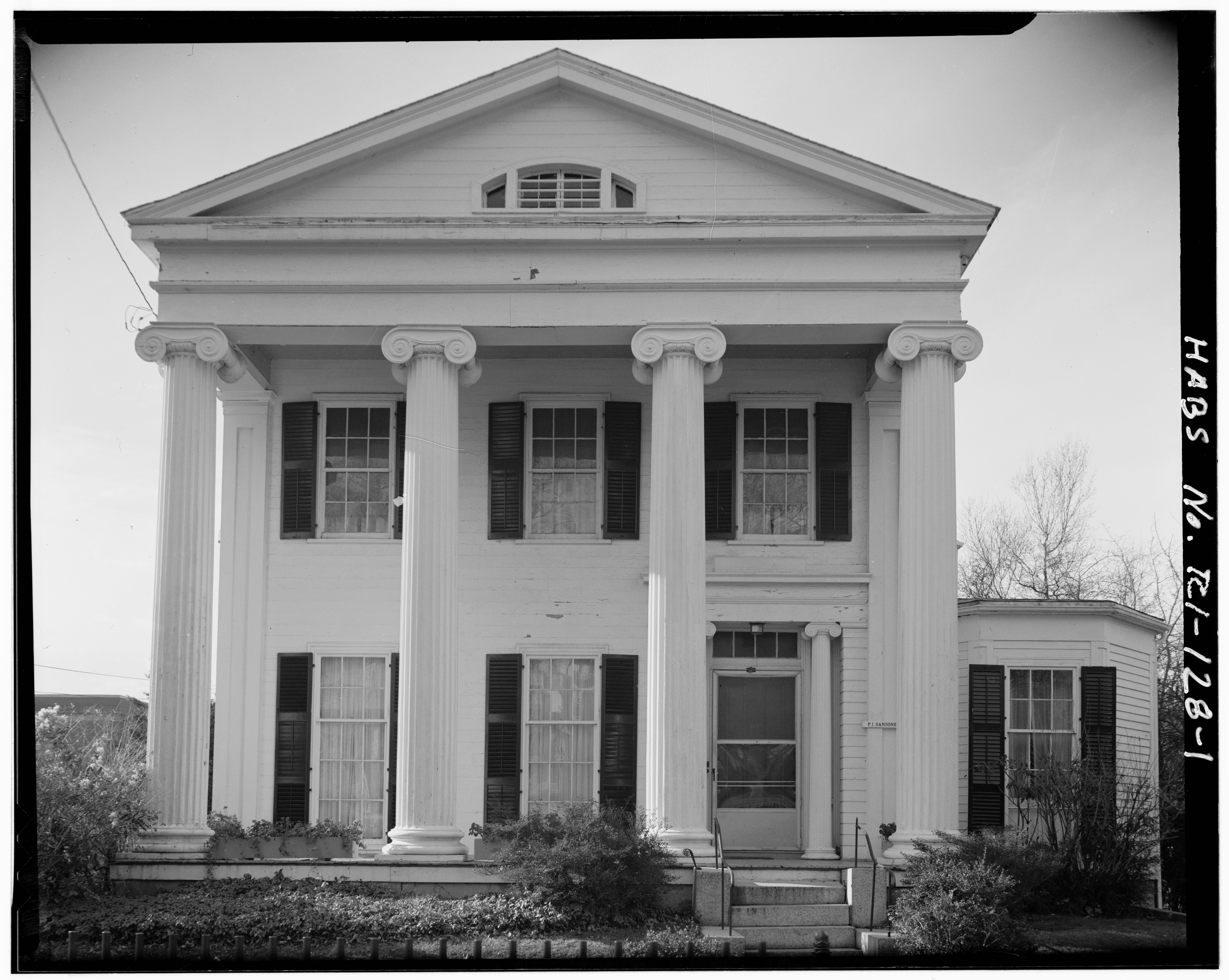
Francis M. Dimond House

Francis Moore Dimond (June 6, 1796 – April 12, 1859) was an American politician and the 23rd governor of Rhode Island.

== Biography ==
Dimond was born in Bristol, Rhode Island on June 6, 1796. During his youth, he traveled to the Caribbean and served for several years (1832–1835) as the United States consul at Port-au-Prince.

From 1842 to 1849, Dimond was United States Consul to the Mexican port city of Veracruz. The knowledge he acquired there proved invaluable during the war with Mexico. During the war with Mexico, he was called to Washington to provide information that would help in the attack on Veracruz. After the battle, the United States Army occupied the area. At the time, Dimond served as an official interpreter for General Winfield Scott. He also became a collector of the Port of Veracruz.

When he returned to Rhode Island, he promoted the Southern Pacific Railway and presided over its construction. He was elected lieutenant governor of Rhode Island in 1853. He became the governor of Rhode Island when Philip Allen resigned to become a Senator. He held the governor's office from July 20, 1853, to May 2, 1854. He was unsuccessful in his re-election bid. He died on April 12, 1859. Dimond was buried in the Juniper Hill Cemetery.

== Francis M. Dimond House ==
In 1838, pre-eminent architect Russell Warren designed a home for Dimond on Hope Street in Bristol. It was one of a set of three Greek Revival houses designed by Warren within 50 feet of each other. Dimond's house was the most expensive of the three, and Dimond went bankrupt and sold it the year it was finished. The home still stands in Bristol.

== Sources ==
- Sobel, Robert and John Raimo. Biographical Directory of the Governors of the United States, 1789-1978. Greenwood Press, 1988. ISBN 0-313-28093-2

Party political offices
Preceded by Philip Allen	Democratic nominee for Governor of Rhode Island; 1854	Succeeded by Americus V. Potter
Political offices
Preceded by Samuel G. Arnold	Lieutenant Governor of Rhode Island; 1853	Succeeded by John J. Reynolds
Preceded by Philip Allen	Governor of Rhode Island; 1853–1854	Succeeded by William W. Hoppin
