= Henry B. Anthony =

American journalist and politician (1815–84)

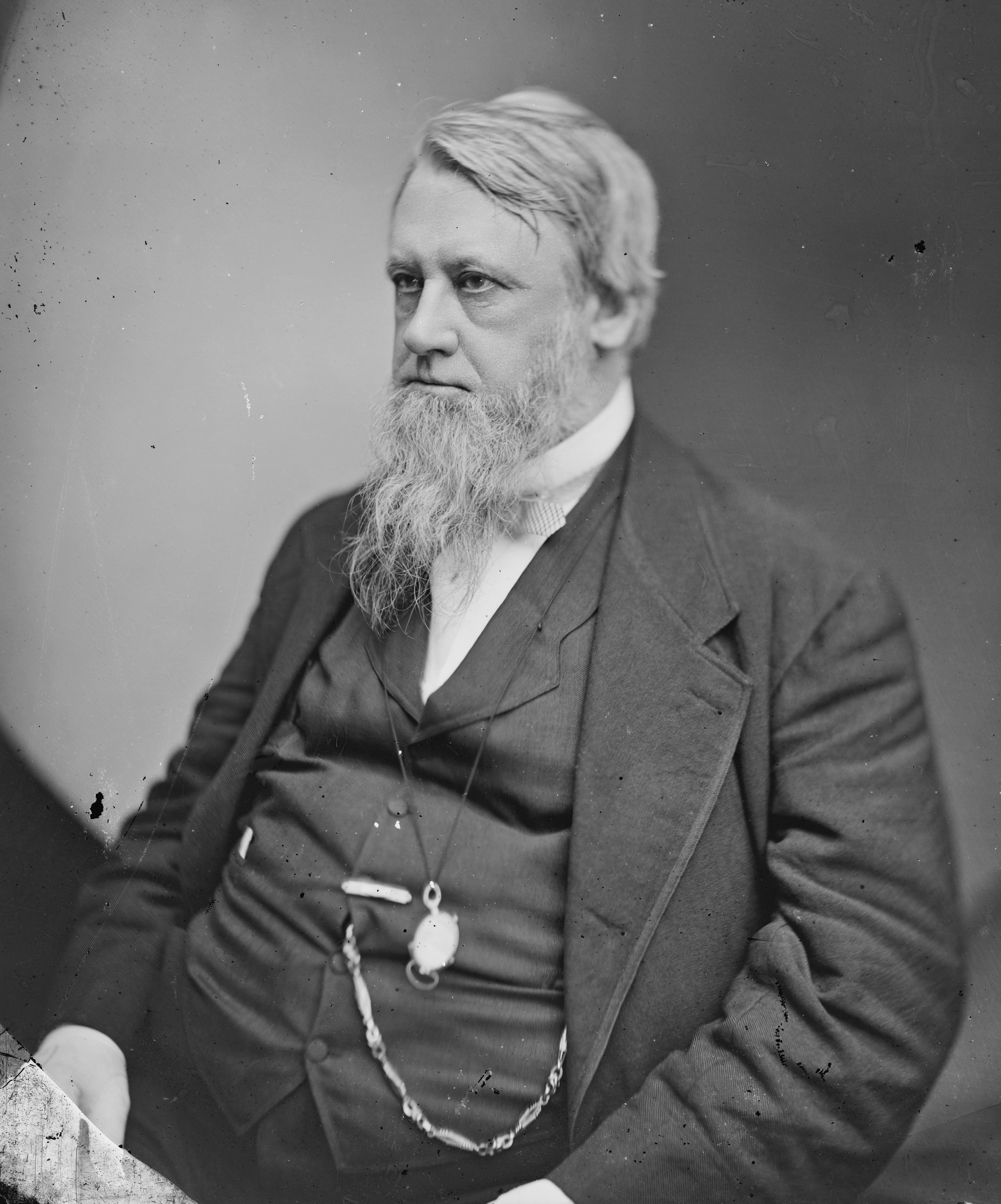
- Anthony, 1865–80

President pro tempore of the United States Senate
- In office January 25, 1875 – February 17, 1875
- Preceded by: Matthew H. Carpenter
- Succeeded by: Thomas W. Ferry
- In office March 23, 1869 – January 24, 1873
- Preceded by: Benjamin F. Wade
- Succeeded by: Matthew H. Carpenter

Chairman of the Senate Republican Conference
- In office December 1862 – September 2, 1884
- Preceded by: John P. Hale
- Succeeded by: John Sherman

United States Senator from Rhode Island
- In office March 4, 1859 – September 2, 1884
- Preceded by: Philip Allen
- Succeeded by: William P. Sheffield

21st Governor of Rhode Island
- In office May 1, 1849 – May 6, 1851
- Lieutenant: Thomas Whipple
- Preceded by: Elisha Harris
- Succeeded by: Philip Allen

Personal details
- Born: April 1, 1815 Coventry, Rhode Island, US
- Died: September 2, 1884 (aged 69) Providence, Rhode Island, US
- Resting place: Swan Point Cemetery
- Party: Whig; Know Nothing; Republican
- Spouse: Sarah Aborn Rhodes (m. 1837; death 1854)
- Education: Brown University
- Profession: Politician, Editor
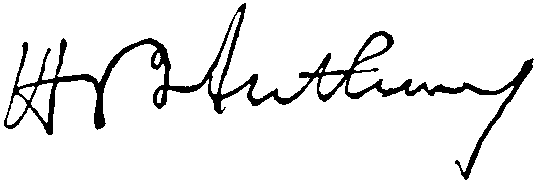
- Signature

Henry Bowen Anthony (April 1, 1815 – September 2, 1884) was an American journalist and politician. He served as editor and was later part owner of the Providence Journal. He was the 21st governor of Rhode Island, serving between 1849 and 1851 as a member of the Whig Party. Near the end of the 1850s, he was elected to the Senate by the Rhode Island Legislature and was re-elected 4 times. He would be twice elected to the Senate's highest post as president pro tempore during the Grant administration, and served until his death in 1884.

== Early life ==
The son of William Anthony and Mary Kennicut Greene, Anthony was born in Rhode Island. He attended Brown University, graduating in 1833 at the age of 18. After his graduation, he went to work as a broker in his brother's cotton products firm, sometimes residing in Savannah, Georgia. He later invested in the firm when his father died in 1845 and earned a substantial income from his investment.

== Career ==
He became editor of the Providence Journal in 1838. In 1840, he was admitted into the partnership, the paper then being published by Knowles, Vose & Anthony until the death of Vose in 1848, when it was continued by Knowles & Anthony until 1863, when it became Knowles, Anthony & Danielson. Anthony also wrote poetry.

As editor of the Journal, Anthony was a conservative, supporting law and order, property requirements for voting, and restrictions on the political power of immigrants. In 1849, and again in 1850, he was elected governor of Rhode Island. As a Whig at the first election he had a majority of 1,556; at the second, fewer than 1,000 votes were cast against him. After declining a third election, he gave himself once more entirely to his editorial work.

In 1855, he traveled in Europe, sending letters with unfavorable observations back to the Journal. On returning, he joined the Know Nothing movement and used the Journal to back its American Party. In Rhode Island, the American Party merged into the Republican Party, and Anthony was elected to the United States Senate as an "American-Republican."

== United States Senator ==
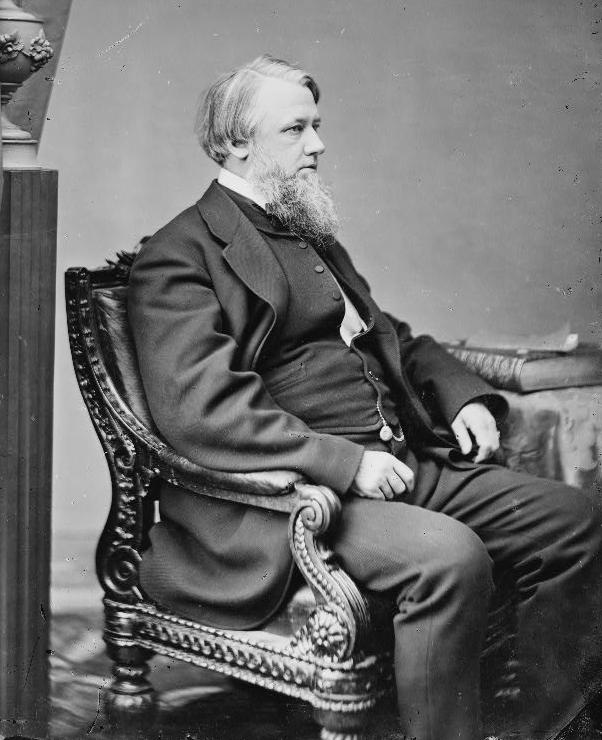
Anthony, 1860–75

Anthony served as a Republican Senator from Rhode Island from March 4, 1859, until his death on September 2, 1884. Initially conciliatory toward the secessionists, he was a strong supporter of Abraham Lincoln's efforts to restore the Union during the American Civil War. After the war, in recognition of his support for the Union, he was elected a third class (i.e. honorary) companion of the District of Columbia Commandery of the Military Order of the Loyal Legion of the United States.

He was twice the chairman of the committee on printing, his practical knowledge of that subject enabling him to introduce many reforms in government printing. The Government Printing Office was formed during his tenure. He was at different times a member of the committees on claims, on naval affairs, on mines and mining, and on post offices and post roads. In the trial of Andrew Johnson, he voted for impeachment. He continued to contribute to the Providence Journal during his service in the Senate.

He served as the President pro tempore of the United States Senate from 1869 to 1873 and again briefly in 1875. He gave up that post when he was elected conference chairman in 1875. As chair, Anthony acted much like the later majority leaders, giving committee assignments to members of his party, calling up bills for debate, and often speaking for his party on the issues of the day. He was also the author of the "Anthony Rule," an early attempt to limit debate in the Senate in the days before cloture. He was known as the "Father of the Senate". Mindful of Anthony's age and infirmity, his colleagues accorded him special honor at the start of his fifth senatorial term in 1883:

As the good old man stood with uplifted hand, every other member of the Senate rose, and stood until the obligation had been administered—a merited compliment to the Pater Senatus. No other man, save Thomas Hart Benton, had ever been sworn in five consecutive times as Senator.

== The Dorriad ==
While in his twenties, Anthony wrote a poetical burlesque satire of the events of the Dorr Rebellion, which was published without attribution in Boston by Justin Jones, 1842. Nearly three decades later, in 1870, it would be republished, again without attribution to Anthony, along with another work concerning the events (by others attributed, with Anthony), titled The Dorriad, and The Great Slocum Dinner, by Sidney S. Rider & Brother, Providence.

== Death and legacy ==
Anthony's funeral, which took place from the First Congregational Church in Providence on 6 September 1884 was the largest funeral ever known in Rhode Island.

Anthony bequeathed a portion of his library, known as the "Harris Collection of American Poetry," to Brown University. It consisted of about 6,000 volumes, mostly small books, many exceedingly rare. It was begun in the first half of the 19th century by Albert G. Greene, continued by Caleb Fiske Harris, and, after his death, completed by his kinsman Senator Anthony.

His name is engraved on a Civil War vintage artillery piece belonging to the Squantum Club in East Providence, Rhode Island. (Two other names are engraved on the artillery piece - General, Governor and Senator Ambrose Burnside and Senator Nelson Aldrich.) The artillery piece is reputed to have been the only gun from Battery A, 1st Rhode Island Light Artillery which did not fall into Confederate hands at the Battle of Bull Run. There is another nearly identical piece, known as the "Bull Run Gun", enshrined at the Rhode Island State House, for which is claimed the same distinction.

== Family ==
In 1837 Anthony married Sarah Aborn Rhodes, daughter of Christopher Rhodes of Pawtuxet. She died in 1854. They had no children, and he never remarried.

== See also ==
- List of members of the United States Congress who died in office (1790–1899)

== Biography ==
- Henry Bowen Anthony. A Memorial. Published by Order of the General Assembly of the State of Rhode Island, E.L. Freeman & Co., 1885.
- Memorial addresses on the life and character of Henry Bowen Anthony (a senator from Rhode Island), United States. 48th Congress, Second Session, 1884–1885, Washington, Government Printing Office.

Party political offices
Preceded by Elisha Harris	Whig nominee for Governor of Rhode Island; 1849, 1850	Succeeded by Josiah Chapin
Political offices
Preceded by Elisha Harris	Governor of Rhode Island; 1849–1851	Succeeded by Philip Allen
Preceded by Benjamin F. Wade	President pro tempore of the United States Senate; March 23, 1869 – January 24, 1873	Succeeded by Matthew H. Carpenter
Preceded by Matthew H. Carpenter	President pro tempore of the United States Senate; January 1875 – February 17, 1875	Succeeded by Thomas W. Ferry
U.S. Senate
Preceded by Philip Allen	U.S. senator (Class 2) from Rhode Island; March 4, 1859 – September 2, 1884; Served alongside: James F. Simmons, Samuel G. Arnold, William Sprague, Ambrose E. Burnside and Nelson W. Aldrich	Succeeded by William P. Sheffield
