= Elisha Dyer =

American politician

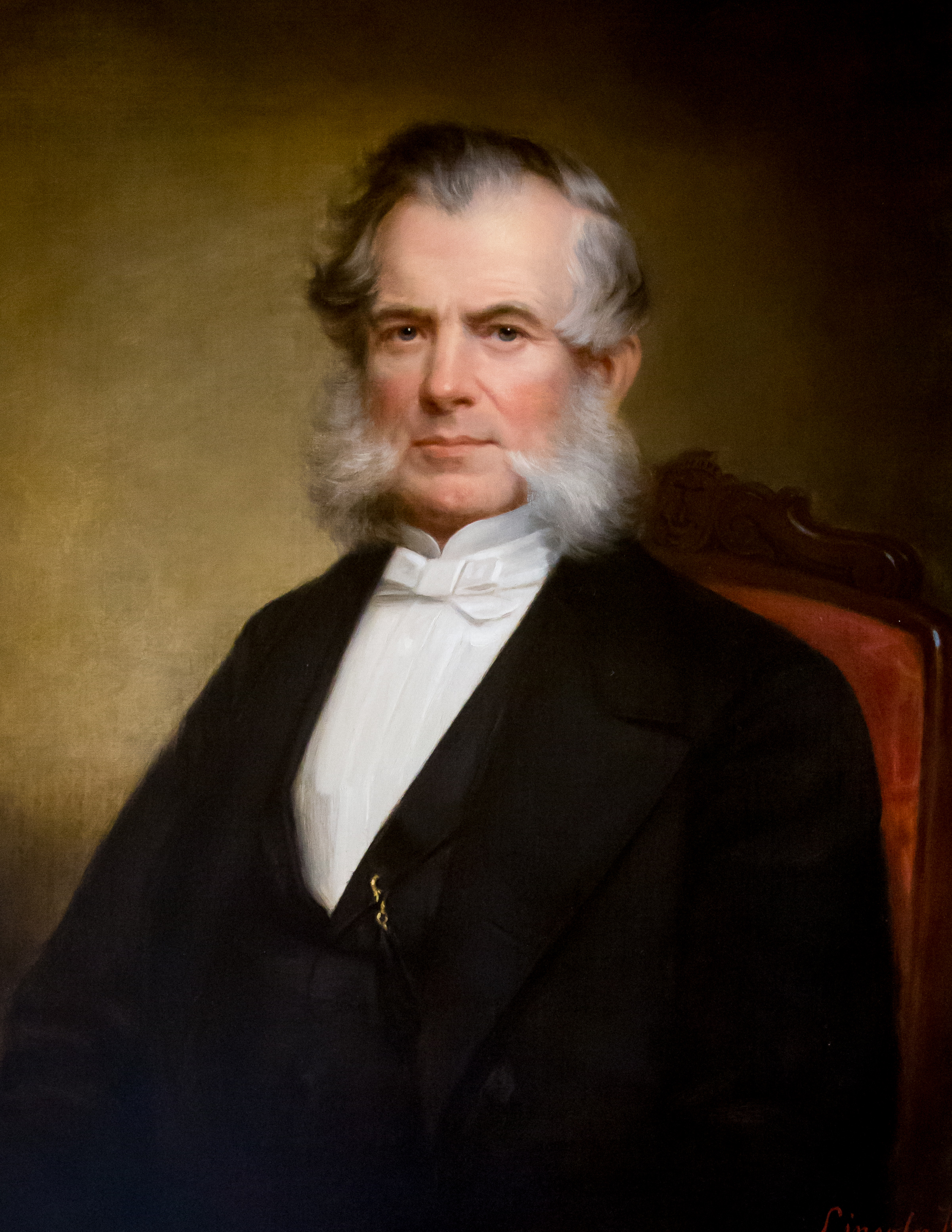
- Portrait by James Sullivan Lincoln

24th Governor of Rhode Island
- In office May 26, 1857 – May 31, 1859
- Lieutenant Governor: Thomas G. Turner
- Preceded by: William W. Hoppin
- Succeeded by: Thomas G. Turner

Personal details
- Born: July 20, 1811 Newport, Rhode Island, U.S.
- Died: May 17, 1890 (aged 78)
- Resting place: Swan Point Cemetery
- Party: Whig; Republican
- Spouse: Anna Jones Hoppin
- Children: Elisha Dyer, Jr.
- Education: Brown University
- Profession: Merchant

Elisha Dyer (July 20, 1811 – May 17, 1890) was an American politician and the 25th governor of Rhode Island.

== Early life ==
Dyer was born in Providence, Rhode Island, on July 20, 1811, to an old New England family which traced its Dyer ancestry back to William Dyer who came to Boston in 1635 from London. Dyer's father was an extensive real estate owner also named Elisha Dyer (1772–1854), and his mother was Francis Dunn (née Jones) Dyer (1782–1873).

Elisha Dyer entered Brown University at age fourteen, and graduated in 1829. After completing his studies, he worked in his father’s mercantile business, Elisha Dyer and Co.

== Career ==
During his life, he was variously associated with the Temperance Party, the Whig Party, and the Republican Party. For example, he was a member of the Whig State Convention in 1851-1855.

In 1840, Dyer was elected Adjutant General of Rhode Island. He held that position for five years. He then served on the Providence School Committee for over a decade.

From May 26, 1857, to May 31, 1859, Dyer served as the Republican governor of Rhode Island.

During the Civil War, Dyer was the captain of Company B of the 10th Rhode Island Volunteer Infantry. He served on active duty from May 23 to September 1, 1862, in the defenses of Washington, D.C.

=== Later life ===
He was appointed Rhode Island’s commissioner to the International Exhibition at London in 1871. He also was President and Director of the Exchange Bank and Second Vice President of the Rhode Island Art Association, and a member of the United States Agricultural Society. Dyer became a member of the Rhode Island Historical Society in 1837, and served on their board of trustees from 1845 to 1848. He was a director of the Swan Point Cemetery in 1860. He was a member and director of the Providence Athenaeum. He was also an active member of the Freemasons.

On March 5, 1884, Dyer was elected as a Veteran Companion of the Massachusetts Commandery of the Military Order of the Loyal Legion of the United States and was issued insignia number 3163. In 1898 he became a member of the Rhode Island Society of the Cincinnati by right of his descent from Captain William Jones (who was also a governor of Rhode Island). He was succeeded in the Society by his son Elisha, Jr.

In later life, Dyer became an invalid. Still, he managed to travel extensively across the Atlantic, even visiting Egypt. He also became a popular public speaker.

== Personal life ==
Dyer married Anna Jones Hoppin, daughter of Thomas C. Hoppin, at the Beneficent Congregational Church in Providence, on October 8, 1833. Anna came from a political family; her grandfather was Governor William Jones and her cousin was Governor William W. Hoppin. Elisha and Anna had seven children, including:

- Elisha Dyer, Jr. (1839–1906), who also became governor of Rhode Island, serving from 1897 to 1900.

Dyer was a member of the Episcopal Church, and attended the Grace Church in Providence.

He died on May 17, 1890, and is interred in Swan Point Cemetery in Providence, Rhode Island.

=== Legacy ===
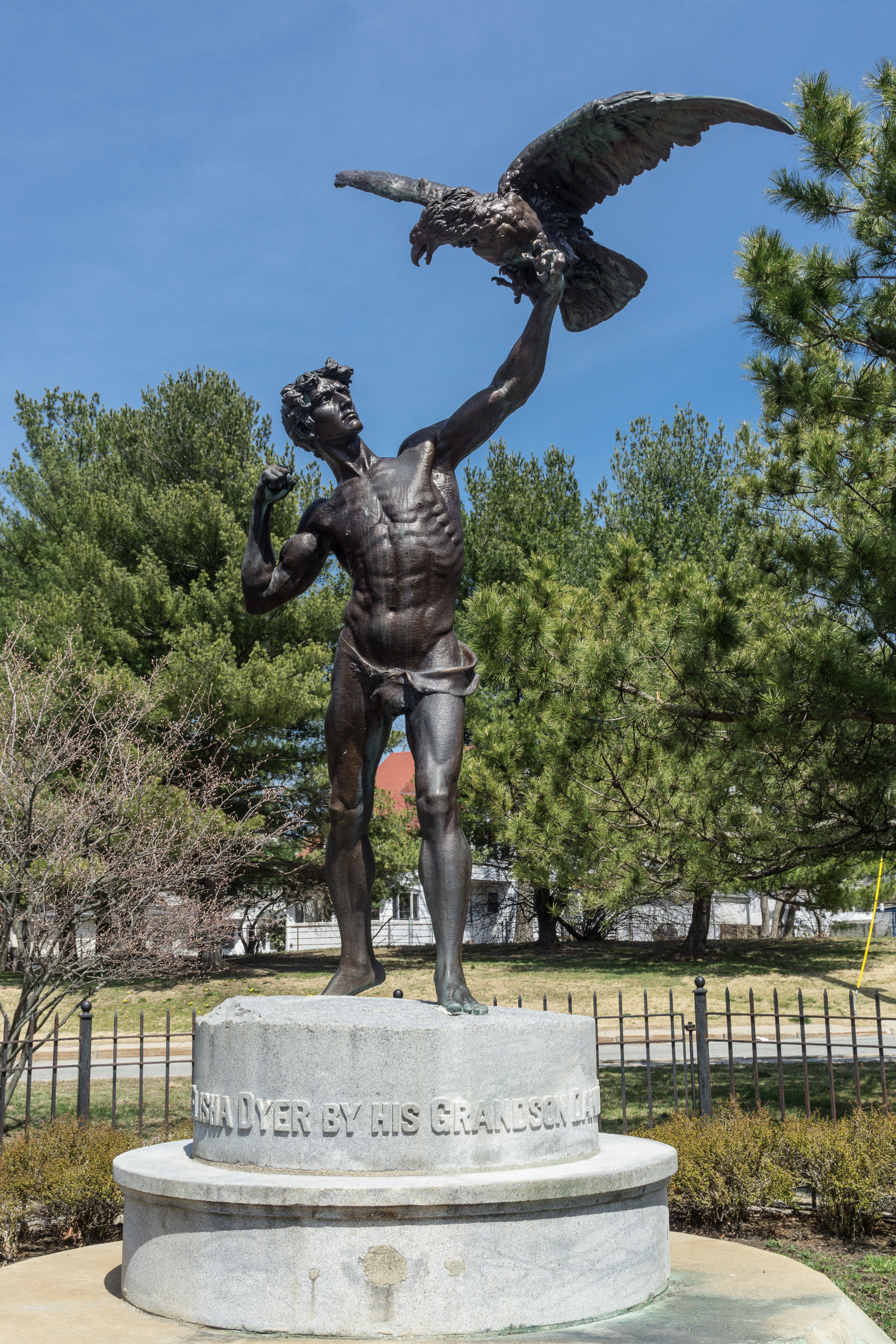
"The Falconer" is a memorial to Dyer.

Industrialist Daniel Wanton Lyman commissioned a bronze statue "The Falconer" as a memorial to Dyer. The statue was designed by Henry Hudson Kitson and installed in Roger Williams Park in 1893.

The Elisha Dyer Camp No. 7 of the Rhode Island Department of the Sons of Union Veterans of the Civil War is named in his and his son's honor.

Party political offices
Preceded by William W. Hoppin	Republican nominee for Governor of Rhode Island; 1857, 1858	Succeeded by Thomas G. Turner
Political offices
Preceded by William W. Hoppin	Governor of Rhode Island; 1857–1859	Succeeded by Thomas G. Turner
