= 1855 Rhode Island gubernatorial election =

- April 4, 1855
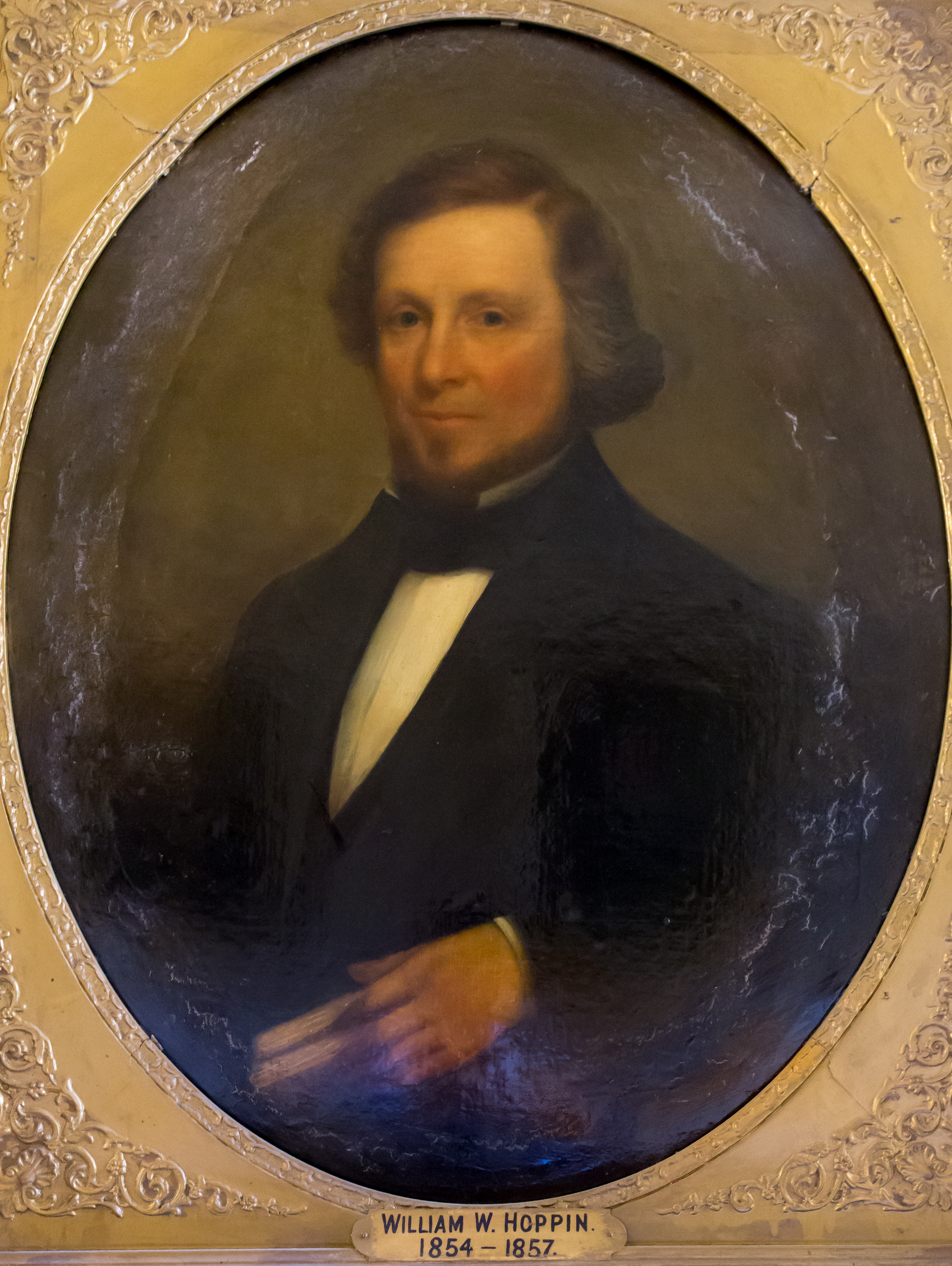

| Nominee | William W. Hoppin | Americus V. Potter |
| Party | Whig | Democratic |
| Popular vote | 11,130 | 2,729 |
| Percentage | 79.97% | 19.61% |
- County results Hoppin: 70–80% 80–90% 90–100%
Governor before election
William W. Hoppin
Whig
Elected Governor
William W. Hoppin
Whig

The 1855 Rhode Island gubernatorial election was held on April 4, 1855, in order to elect the governor of Rhode Island. Incumbent Whig governor William W. Hoppin won re-election against Democratic nominee Americus V. Potter.

== General election ==
On election day, April 4, 1855, incumbent Whig governor William W. Hoppin won re-election by a margin of 8,401 votes against his Democratic opponent Americus V. Potter, thereby retaining Whig control over the office of governor. Hoppin was sworn in for his second term on May 26, 1855.

=== Results ===
Rhode Island gubernatorial election, 1855
| Party | Candidate | Votes | % |
|---|---|---|---|
| Whig | William W. Hoppin (incumbent) | 11,130 | 79.97 |
| Democratic | Americus V. Potter | 2,729 | 19.61 |
| Scattering | | 59 | 0.42 |
| Total votes | | 13,918 | 100.00 |
| Whig hold | | | |
