= Edward Harris (Rhode Island politician) =

American businessman and philanthropist (1801–1872)

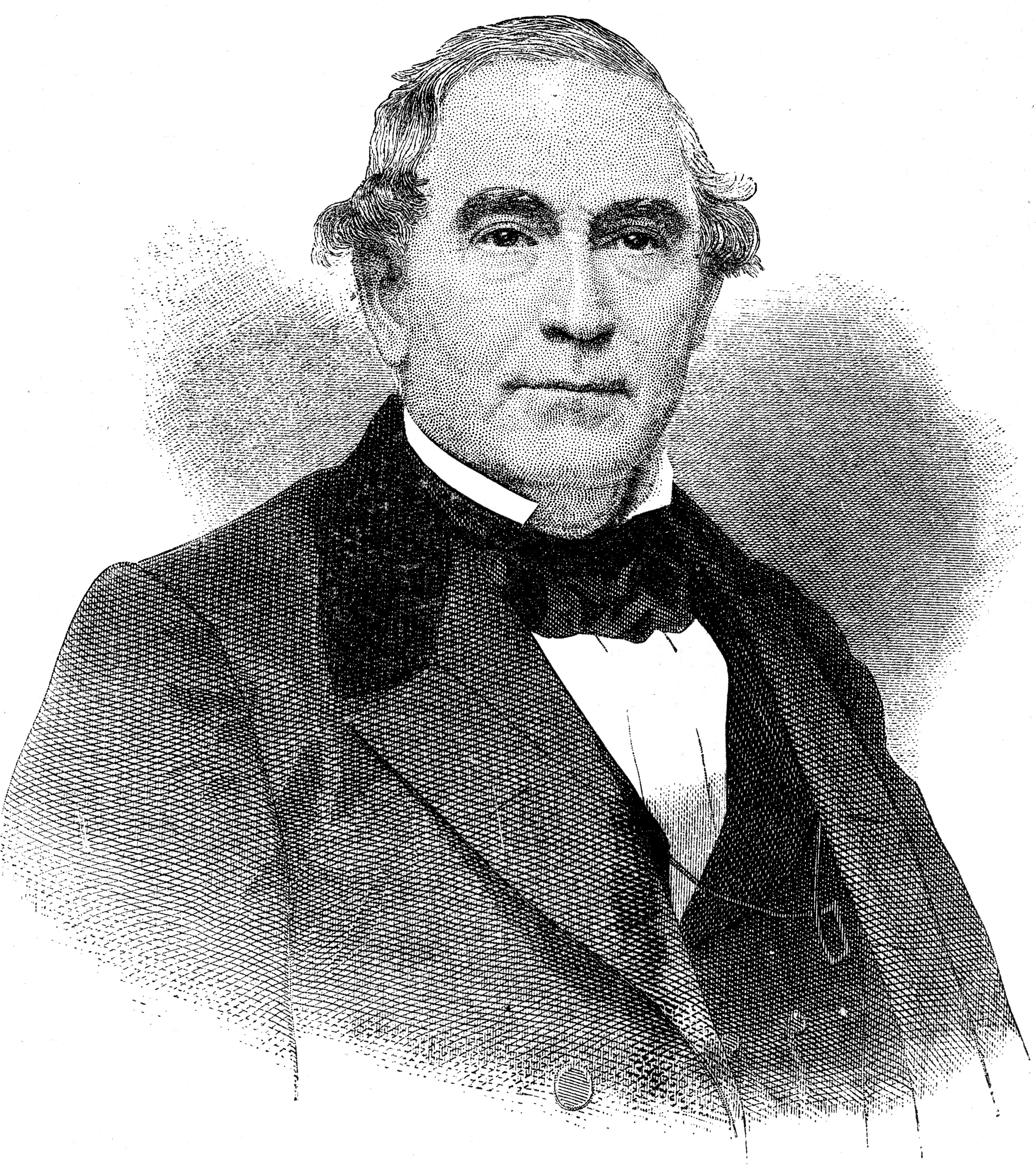
Edward Harris, founder of the Woonsocket Public Library, the first public library in Rhode Island

Edward Harris (1801–1872) was an American wool manufacturer, abolitionist, temperance supporter, and philanthropist. He founded the Woonsocket Harris Public Library, the second public library in Rhode Island, and the Harris Institute. The latter building is now used for the Woonsocket City Hall.

== Biography ==
Harris was born in Smithfield, Rhode Island in 1801. At a young age he moved with his parents to Dutchess County, New York, where he worked on the family farm and taught school.

In 1818 he moved to Ashtabula County, Ohio, but he returned to Rhode Island in 1823. There he started working with his paternal uncles William Harris and Samuel Harris in their manufacturing businesses at Valley Falls and then Albion, Rhode Island.

In 1831 Edward Harris started his own small mill in Woonsocket, Rhode Island. He eventually built several other successful larger mills there. Harris made large donations to many public causes in Woonsocket, including new roads for the city, land for Woonsocket High School, the site of Oak Hill Cemetery, and the Harris Institute. This library and auditorium was later used as the Woonsocket Harris Public Library. The former Harris Institute building is now adapted for use as Woonsocket City Hall.

Harris entered politics, being elected to both the Rhode Island State Senate and House of Representatives. He was a strong abolitionist and temperance supporter. In the 1840s he ran for governor as the Liberty Party candidate advocating for abolitionism.

In 1859 Harris wrote a letter and sent a check to John Brown after his conviction for killings at Harper's Ferry. Harris hosted Abraham Lincoln at his North End home when Lincoln spoke at the Harris Institute in 1860.

Harris married Rachel Farnham, and they had children together. After her death, the widower married again, to Abby Metcalf and they also had children. Harris died in Woonsocket in 1871. In addition to the Harris Institute (Woonsocket City Hall), several other buildings constructed by Harris survive, including Harris Warehouse (1855).

Party political offices
First	Free Soil nominee for Governor of Rhode Island; 1849, 1850, 1851	Vacant Title next held by Himself
Vacant Title next held by Himself	Free Soil nominee for Governor of Rhode Island; 1853	Succeeded by None
