= 1849 Rhode Island gubernatorial election =

- April 4, 1849
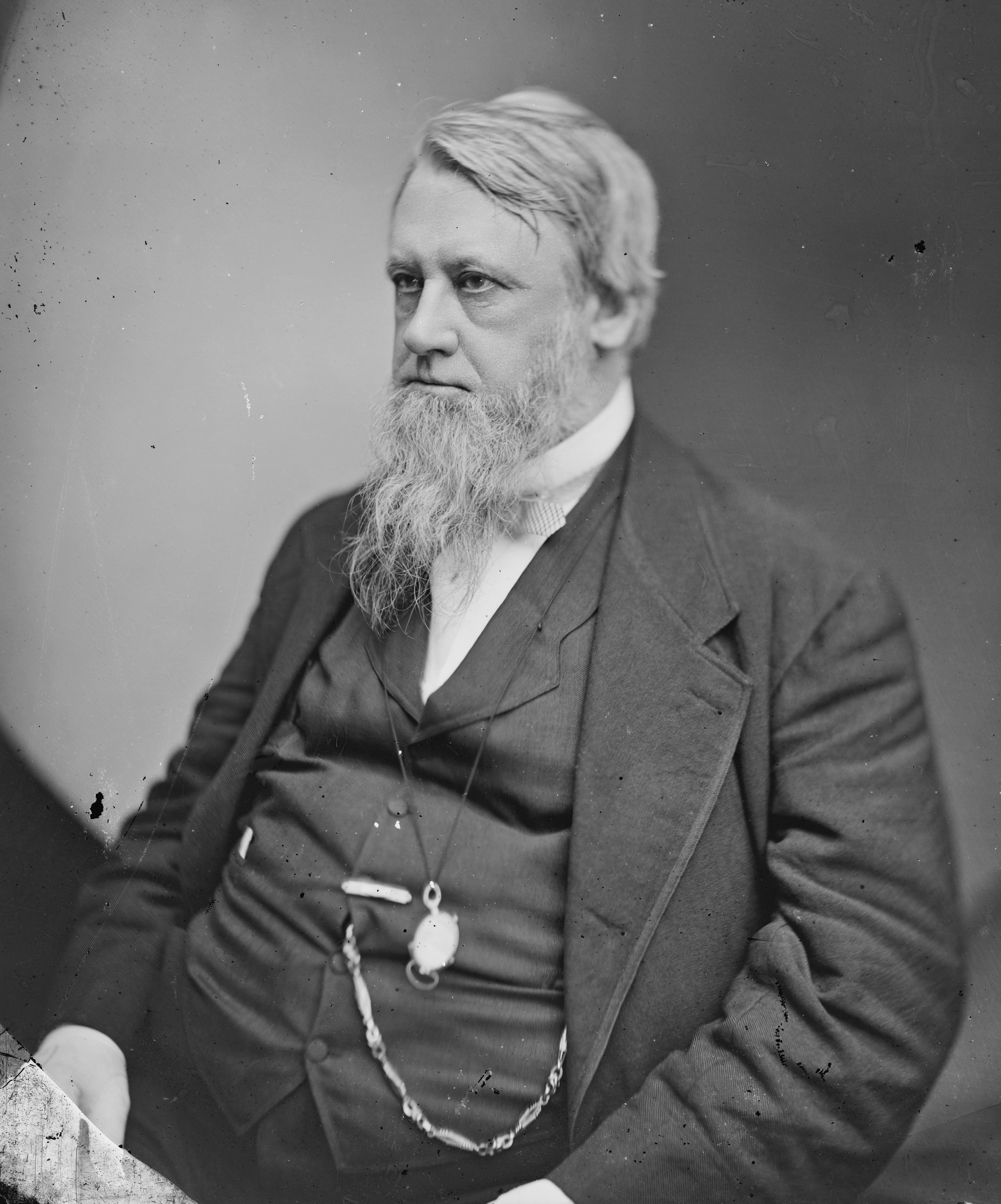

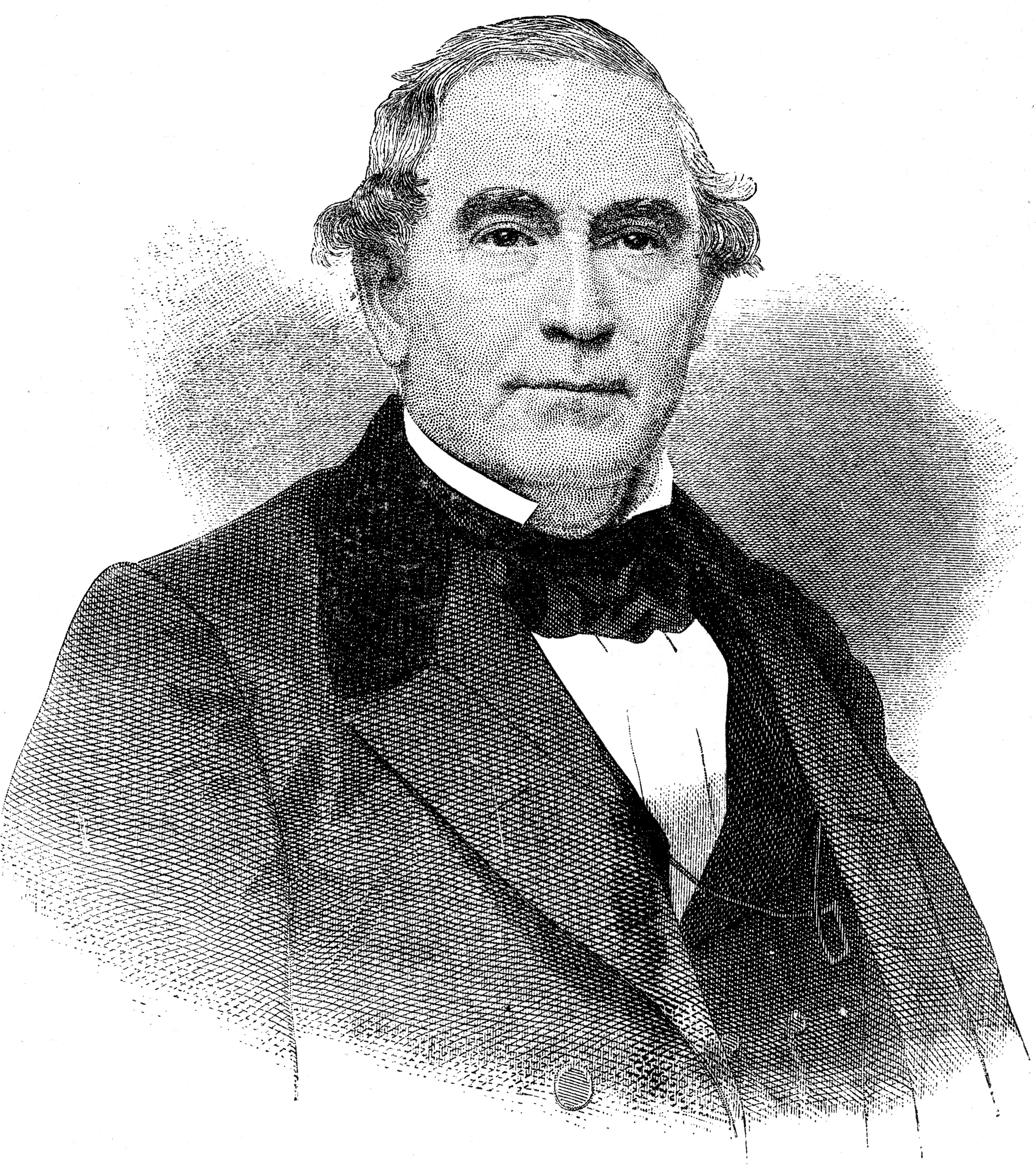
Nominee	Henry B. Anthony	Adnah Sackett	Edward Harris
Party	Whig	Democratic	Free Soil
Popular vote	5,081	2,964	458
Percentage	58.98%	34.41%	5.32%
- County results Anthony: 50–60% 60–70% 80–90%
Governor before election
Elisha Harris
Whig
Elected Governor
Henry B. Anthony
Whig

The 1849 Rhode Island gubernatorial election was held on April 4, 1849.

Incumbent Whig governor Elisha Harris did not run for re-election. Whig nominee Henry B. Anthony defeated Democratic nominee Adnah Sackett and Free Soil nominee Edward Harris.

== General election ==
=== Candidates ===
- Adnah Sackett, Democratic, manufacturer of jewelry, nominee for governor in 1848
- Edward Harris, Free Soil, manufacturer
- Henry B. Anthony, Whig, editor of the Providence Journal

=== Results ===
1849 Rhode Island gubernatorial election
Party	Candidate	Votes	%	±%
Whig	Henry B. Anthony	5,081	58.98%	
Democratic	Adnah Sackett	2,964	34.41%	
Free Soil	Edward Harris	458	5.32%	
Scattering		112	1.30%	
Majority		2,117	24.57%	
Turnout		8,615		
Whig hold		Swing		
