= Philip Allen (Rhode Island politician) =

American manufacturer and politician

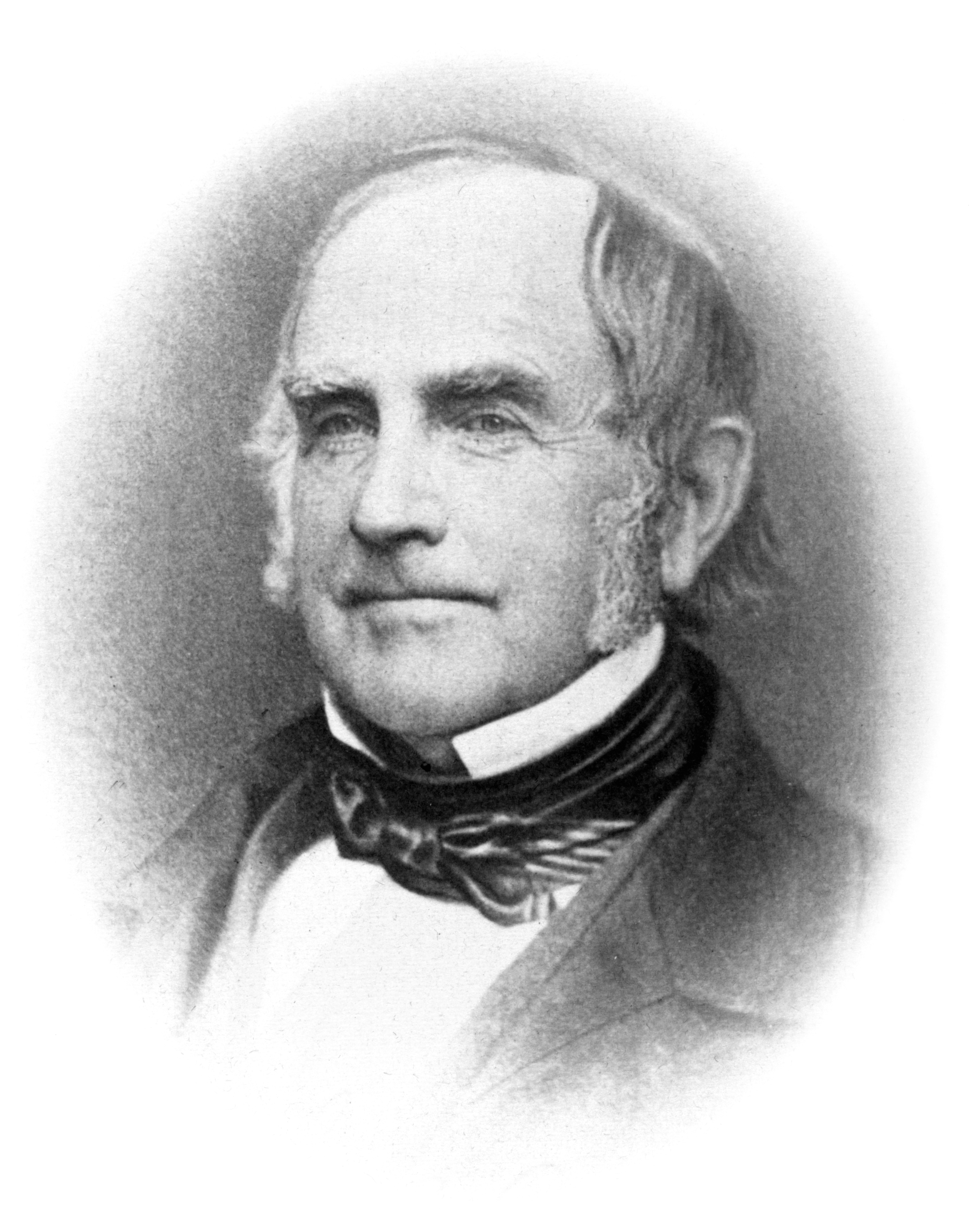

United States Senator from Rhode Island
- In office July 20, 1853 – March 3, 1859
- Preceded by: John H. Clarke
- Succeeded by: Henry B. Anthony

22nd Governor of Rhode Island
- In office May 6, 1851 – July 20, 1853
- Lieutenant: William B. Lawrence; Samuel G. Arnold
- Preceded by: Henry B. Anthony
- Succeeded by: Francis M. Dimond

Member of the Rhode Island House of Representatives
- In office 1819–1821

Personal details
- Born: September 1, 1785 Providence, Rhode Island, U.S.
- Died: December 16, 1865 (aged 80) Providence, Rhode Island, U.S.
- Resting place: North Burial Ground; Providence, Rhode Island
- Party: Democratic
- Spouse: Phoebe Aborn
- Relations: Thomas W. Dorr (nephew)
- Parent(s): Zachariah Allen; Nancy Crawford Allen
- Education: College of Rhode Island and Providence Plantations
- Profession: Politician, Manufacturer
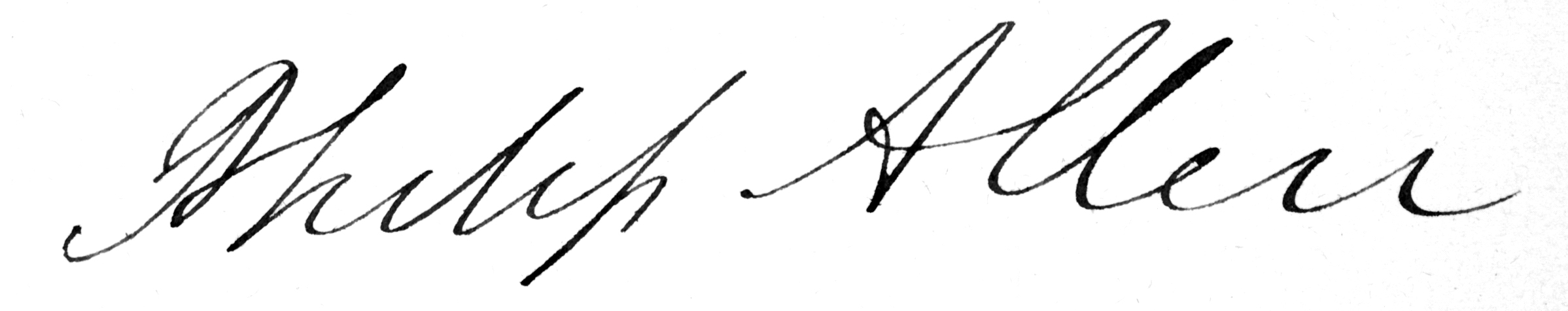
- Signature

Philip Allen (September 1, 1785 – December 16, 1865) was an American manufacturer and politician from Rhode Island. He served as Governor of Rhode Island and as a Democratic member of the United States Senate.

== Early life ==
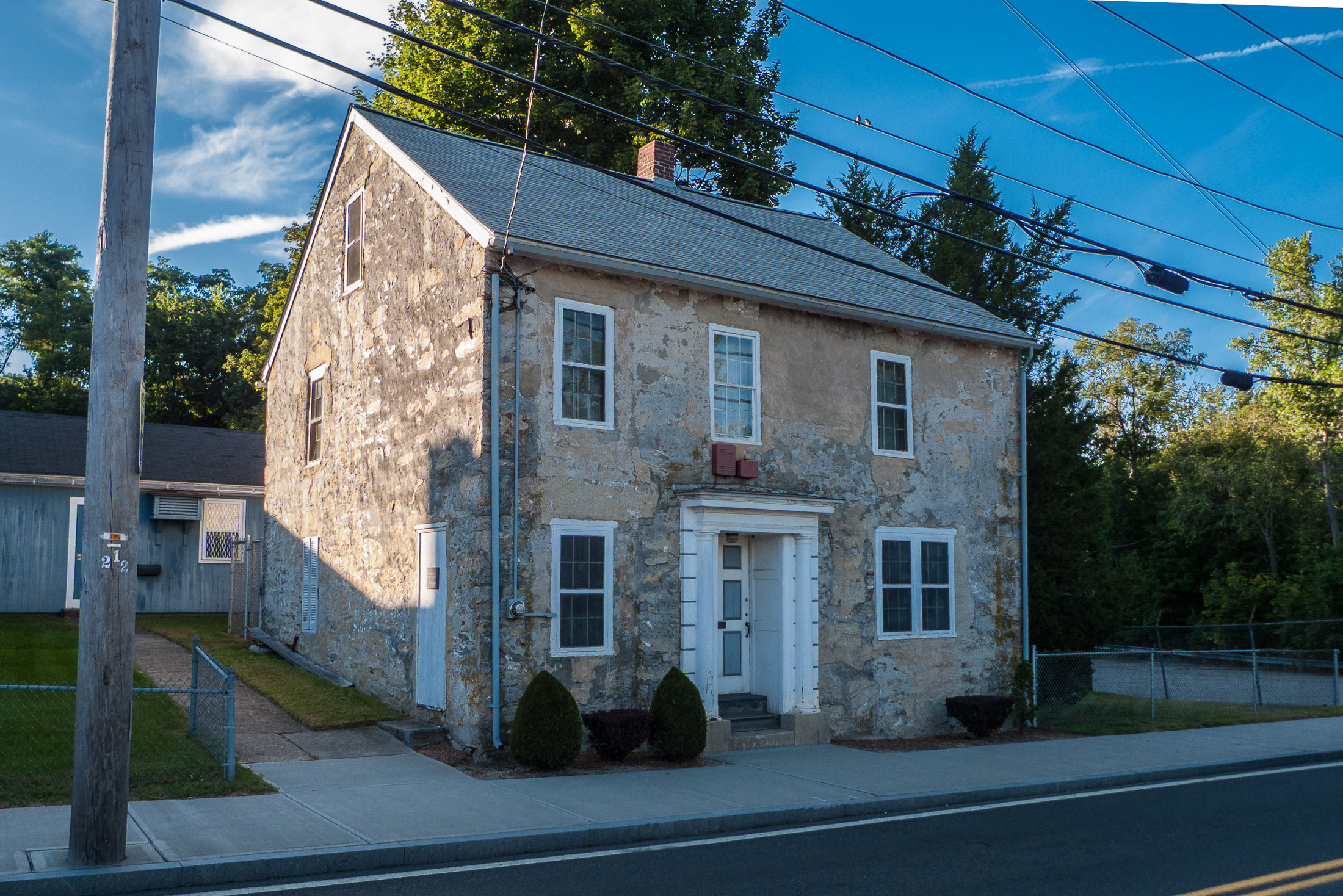
The storehouse of Allen's mill in Smithfield in 2013.

Allen was born in Providence, Rhode Island, the son of Zachariah Allen and Nancy Crawford Allen. He was educated by private tutors and attended Taunton Academy and Robert Rogers School in Newport, Rhode Island. In 1803, he graduated from the College of Rhode Island and Providence Plantations (the former name of Brown University) at Providence. After graduation, he engaged in mercantile pursuits and foreign commerce before becoming a manufacturer of cotton goods in Smithfield, Rhode Island. He was president of the Providence Insurance Company, and in 1831 he began manufacturing cotton goods in Providence.

== Political career ==
He began his political career as a member of the Rhode Island House of Representatives, serving from 1819 to 1821. In 1827, he was appointed pension agent and president of the Rhode Island branch of the United States Bank.

Allen was elected as the Democratic Governor of Rhode Island in 1851. He served as Governor until 1853, when he resigned that office after being elected to represent Rhode Island in the United States Senate. Allen served in the Senate from July 20, 1853 to March 3, 1859, and was Chairman for the Committee of Agriculture, Nutrition and Forestry during the Thirty-third Congress and the Thirty-fourth Congress. He was not a candidate for renomination, and retired from politics and business in 1859.

He died in Providence on December 16, 1865, and is interred in the North Burial Ground in Providence.

== Family life ==
He married Phoebe Aborn in 1815, and they had eleven children.

== Honors ==
In 2016, Allen was inducted into the Rhode Island Heritage Hall of Fame.

Party political offices
Vacant Title last held by Adnah Sackett	Democratic nominee for Governor of Rhode Island; 1851, 1852, 1853	Succeeded by Francis M. Dimond
Political offices
Preceded by Henry B. Anthony	Governor of Rhode Island; 1851–1853	Succeeded by Francis M. Dimond
U.S. Senate
Preceded by John H. Clarke	U.S. senator (Class 2) from Rhode Island; July 20, 1853 – March 3, 1859; Served alongside: Charles T. James and James F. Simmons	Succeeded by Henry B. Anthony
