= William W. Hoppin =

American politician

William Warner Hoppin
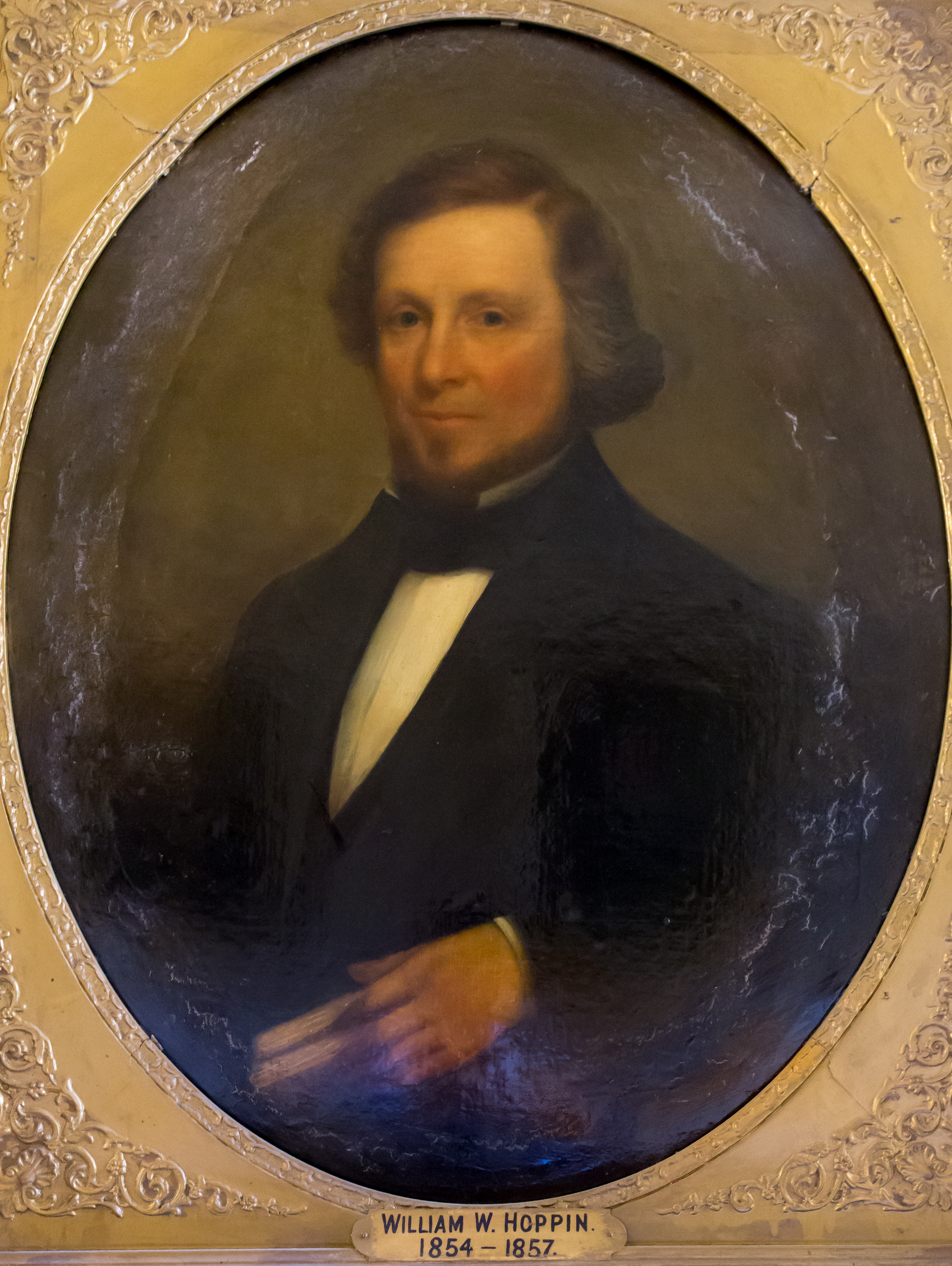

24th Governor of Rhode Island
- In office May 2, 1854 – May 26, 1857
- Lieutenant: John J. Reynolds; Anderson C. Rose; Nicholas Brown III
- Preceded by: Francis M. Dimond
- Succeeded by: Elisha Dyer

Member of the Rhode Island House of Representatives
- In office 1853–1854

Personal details
- Born: September 1, 1807 Providence, Rhode Island, U.S.
- Died: April 19, 1890 (aged 82) Providence, Rhode Island, U.S.
- Resting place: Swan Point Cemetery
- Party: Know Nothing; Whig; Republican
- Spouse(s): Frances Augusta Frederica Street (1807–1879) (Married June 26, 1836)
- Children: 2
- Education: Yale University; Yale Law School
- Profession: Attorney

William Warner Hoppin (September 1, 1807 – April 19, 1890) was the 24th governor of Rhode Island from 1854 to 1857.

== Early life ==
Hoppin was a native of Providence, Rhode Island, the brother of James Mason Hoppin. He graduated from the Hopkins School in 1824 and then went to Yale University and Yale Law School. He practiced law in Providence.

== Political career ==
He was elected to the Providence City Council in 1838 and served for four years. He later became active as a Whig, and in 1847 he was elected to Providence's Board of Aldermen, where he served for five years.

In 1853 he was elected to the Rhode Island State Senate, where he served until 1854.

He was elected Governor as a Whig and served three one year terms, 2 May 1854 to 26 May 1857.

Hoppin was a member of the Know Nothing or American Party, an anti-Catholic organization which was very influential in Rhode Island during Hoppin's term of office. Hoppin won the Governorship by heading both the Whig and Know-Nothing tickets.

In 1854, Governor Hoppin helped spread rumor of an armed Catholic conspiracy in Rhode Island. In response to this imagined threat, Hoppin provided uniforms and weapons to form the "Guards of Liberty," a military unit whose members consisted solely of native-born white Protestants.

He became a Republican when the party was founded in the 1850s, and he was a Delegate to the 1856 Republican National Convention, and campaigned for John C. Fremont.

He participated in the Peace Conference of 1861, which attempted to prevent the start of the American Civil War. When the war began he was a staunch supporter of the Union cause, campaigning for Abraham Lincoln in 1860 and 1864, and Ulysses S. Grant in 1868 and 1872. During the war, Hoppin was active in efforts to raise troops for Rhode Island's regiments and other activities in support of the Union Army.

In 1866 Hoppin was returned to the Rhode Island Senate, and served until 1867. In 1875, he was elected to one term in the Rhode Island House of Representatives.

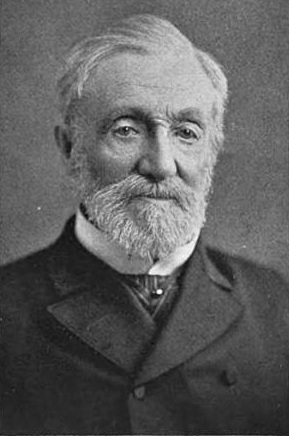
Hoppin later in life

Hoppin was appointed a federal Registrar in Bankruptcy in 1867, and served until 1872.

He was a hereditary member of the Rhode Island Society of the Cincinnati and served as its vice president. He was also a 3rd Class Companion (i.e. honorary member) of the Massachusetts Commandery of the Military Order of the Loyal Legion of the United States in recognition of his support for the Union during the Civil War.

== Death and burial ==
Governor Hoppin died in Providence on April 19, 1890, and was buried in Providence's Swan Point Cemetery.

Party political offices
| Preceded by Josiah Harris | Whig nominee for Governor of Rhode Island; 1853, 1854, 1855 | Succeeded by None |
| First | Republican nominee for Governor of Rhode Island; 1856 | Succeeded by Elisha Dyer |
Political offices
| Preceded by Francis M. Dimond | Governor of Rhode Island; 1854–1857 | Succeeded by Elisha Dyer |
