= Dexter Donation =

Charitable trust for the poor of Providence, Rhode Island

- Named after: Ebenezer Knight Dexter
- Formation: November 22, 1824; 201 years ago
- Founder: Ebenezer Knight Dexter (bequest)
- Type: Municipal charitable trust
- Headquarters: Providence City Hall
- Region served: Providence, Rhode Island
- Services: Grants to nonprofit organizations serving the poor
- Chair: Mayor of Providence (ex officio)
- Main organ: Commissioners of the Dexter Donation
- Parent organization: City of Providence
- Endowment: US$9.7 million (2026)
- Website: www.providenceri.gov/dexter-donation/

The Dexter Donation is a charitable trust for the poor of Providence, Rhode Island, established with property and money left to the town in the will of Ebenezer Knight Dexter, a childless widower who died in 1824. In three paragraphs of his will, Dexter left the town a West End tract to be used as a militia training field; his Neck Farm on the East Side, where the town built the Dexter Asylum for the poor; and the remainder of his estate, including houses, lots, and farmland.

As Dexter's will required, the Donation is governed by a meeting of at least forty "freemen," which elects the commissioners of the Dexter Donation. Its money is now held in two accounts, the original Dexter Donation fund and the 1957 Ebenezer Knight Dexter Trust Fund, together worth about $9.7 million in 2026. Drawing from the funds' investment income, the commissioners now make grants to nonprofit organizations serving the poor, which apply through the city clerk.

== Ebenezer Knight Dexter ==
Ebenezer Knight Dexter was born in Providence on April 26, 1773. His third great-grandfather was Gregory Dexter, the printer of Roger Williams's A Key into the Language of America. Dexter was a merchant who sold groceries and imported gin, served as United States Marshal for Rhode Island, sat on bank boards and dealt in real estate. His only child died in 1801 at the age of five months and his wife died in 1819. (Note: The city's monument to Dexter in the North Burial Ground gives Waitstill Dexter's death as June 15, 1819; Conley gives May 1819.) Dexter died, a widower without heirs, after a long illness on August 10, 1824.

== The bequest ==
Ebenezer Knight Dexter statue

Dexter signed his will about two and a half months before his death. After private legacies, and annuities that the town was to pay out of the estate it received, the will left the greater part of his property to the town, in three parts:

- Training field (paragraph 16): a lot in the West End between Cranston and High streets, bounded on the east by Dexter Street, to be used solely as a militia training field on which no public execution was ever to take place; a strip 150 feet deep at each end was excepted and reserved for house lots.
- Neck Farm (paragraph 17): nearly forty acres on the East Side, in the area now bounded by Hope Street, Lloyd Avenue, Arlington Avenue and Angell Street, given "to be appropriated to the accommodation and support of the poor of said town ... and for no other use or purpose whatever." The town was to build housing for the poor there within five years and, within twenty, enclose the farm with "a good permanent stone wall, at least three feet thick at the bottom, and at least eight feet high."
- Residuary estate (paragraph 18): the rest of his real and personal property, including his house on Benefit Street, a tavern on North Main Street, a farm and wood lots in Smithfield and North Providence, house lots, marsh land, and the East Side tract later developed along Doyle Avenue, to be kept as "a permanent fund for the benefit of the poor of said town, and to be preserved entire for ever."

The gift to the town was valued at about $60,000. The town could sell any of the real estate except the Neck Farm and the training field. Once the poorhouse was built, the income was to support the poor as the town meeting directed, but no vote on the property or its income was valid "unless forty freemen, at least, be present."

== Acceptance by the town ==
At a special town meeting on November 22, 1824, with "more than forty freemen" present, the town accepted the gift, (Note: Staples (1843), the 1894 city report, Newman (citing the city clerk's 1879 compilation of the town proceedings) and Conley give November 22. The Rhode Island Supreme Court's 1926 opinion gives November 24.) resolving that its conditions were "altogether judicious and just" and pledging the faith of the town to their performance. The meeting directed that the property be called the "Dexter Donation," that the town treasurer keep it separate from the town's other property and funds, and that it be "under the immediate direction of not more than five commissioners, to be called the Commissioners of the Dexter Donation." The first commissioners were Thomas P. Ives, Samuel W. Bridgham, Cyrus Butler, Elisha Dyer and Thomas Burgess.

== Governance ==
The Dexter Donation is governed at two levels: a town meeting of Providence "freemen," which the will required for any decision about the property, and a board of commissioners elected by that meeting to manage it. When Providence was incorporated as a city in 1831, replacing its town government, the city charter preserved the arrangement, permitting "not less than forty" freemen "to hold town meetings ... for the purpose of transacting business in relation to the property and estate devised to the town of Providence by the last will and testament of Ebenezer Knight Dexter and denominated the Dexter Donation." The freemen met annually, summoned by church bells, including that of the First Baptist Church; the city fixed the meeting in October in 1832, in June from 1834 and in December from 1884.

The board originally had five elected commissioners; in 1865 the mayor was added as an ex officio member, and Mayor Thomas A. Doyle chaired the commission for most of the period from 1864 to 1886. In the 20th century the meeting became harder to convene, and messengers canvassed City Hall for anyone willing to attend; in 1959, when the 136th annual meeting lacked a quorum, about half a dozen police detectives were called in to sit as freemen. After 1960 the meeting was held every two years instead of annually. In the mid-1980s the commissioners chose their own chairman; later the mayor automatically became chair.

== Training field (Dexter Training Ground) ==
Dexter's will set aside the West End tract—bought from his sister—as a training field for the militia and forbade public executions on it. The tract, sixteen and a half acres, included strips 150 feet deep along High Street and Cranston Road that the city could sell; the rest was reserved as the training field, which measured about nine acres. With the Neck Farm, it was the only part of the bequest the town could not sell.

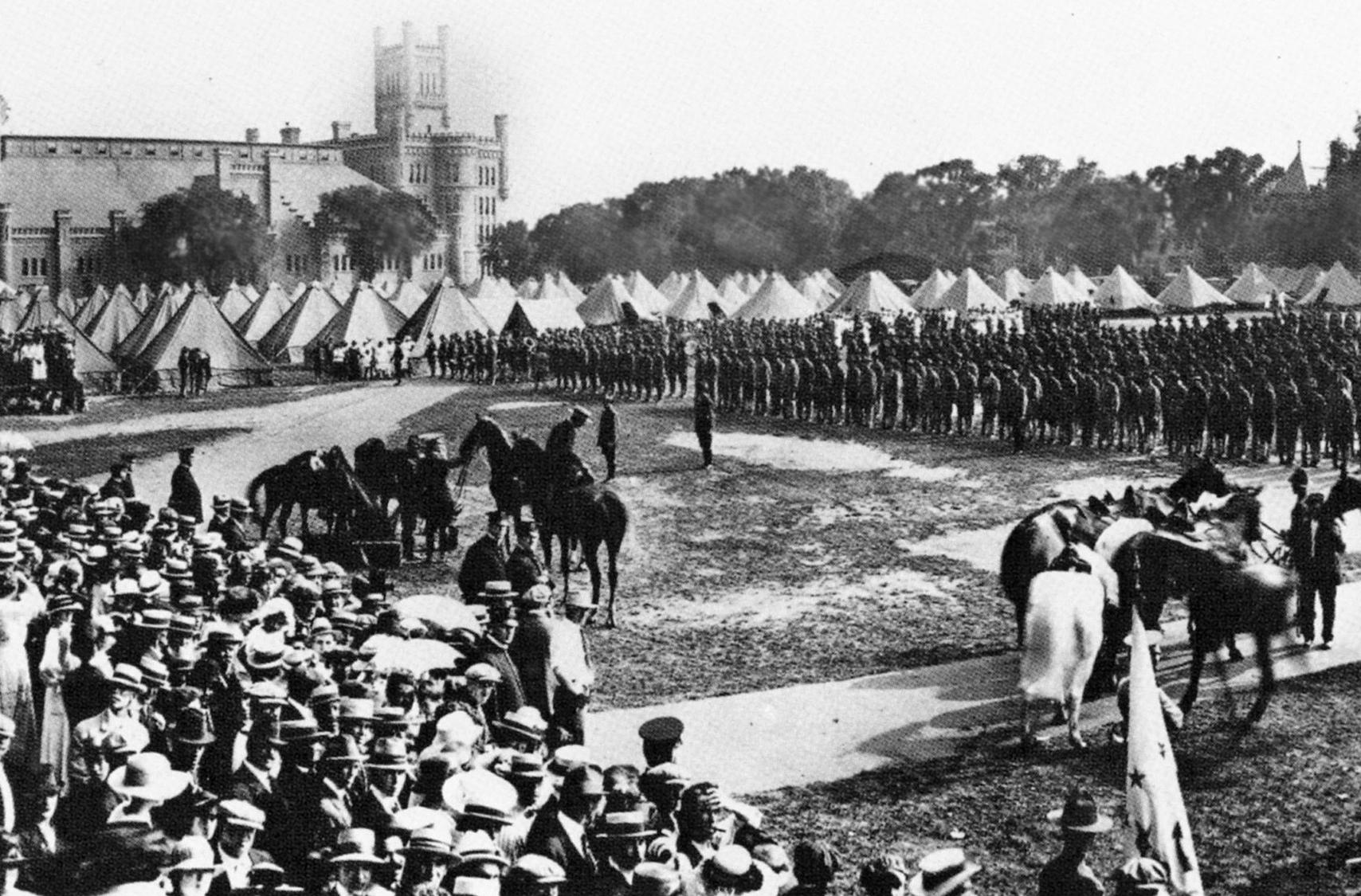
Troops assemble at the Dexter Training Ground on July 25, 1917

The field was used for musters during the Dorr Rebellion in 1842 and the Civil War, when the 14th Rhode Island Heavy Artillery, a Black regiment, was raised there in the summer of 1863, and for the last time in 1917, during World War I.

By 1894, its military use had greatly diminished, and, with the commissioners' consent, the city maintained it as a park. In 1894 Henry C. Clark presented an eight-foot bronze statue of Dexter by Hippolyte L. Hubert, cast by the Gorham Manufacturing Company, which stands at the north end of the field, and in 1904–1908 the state built the Cranston Street Armory at its south end. The field is now a public park called the Dexter Training Ground.

== Neck Farm (Dexter Asylum) ==
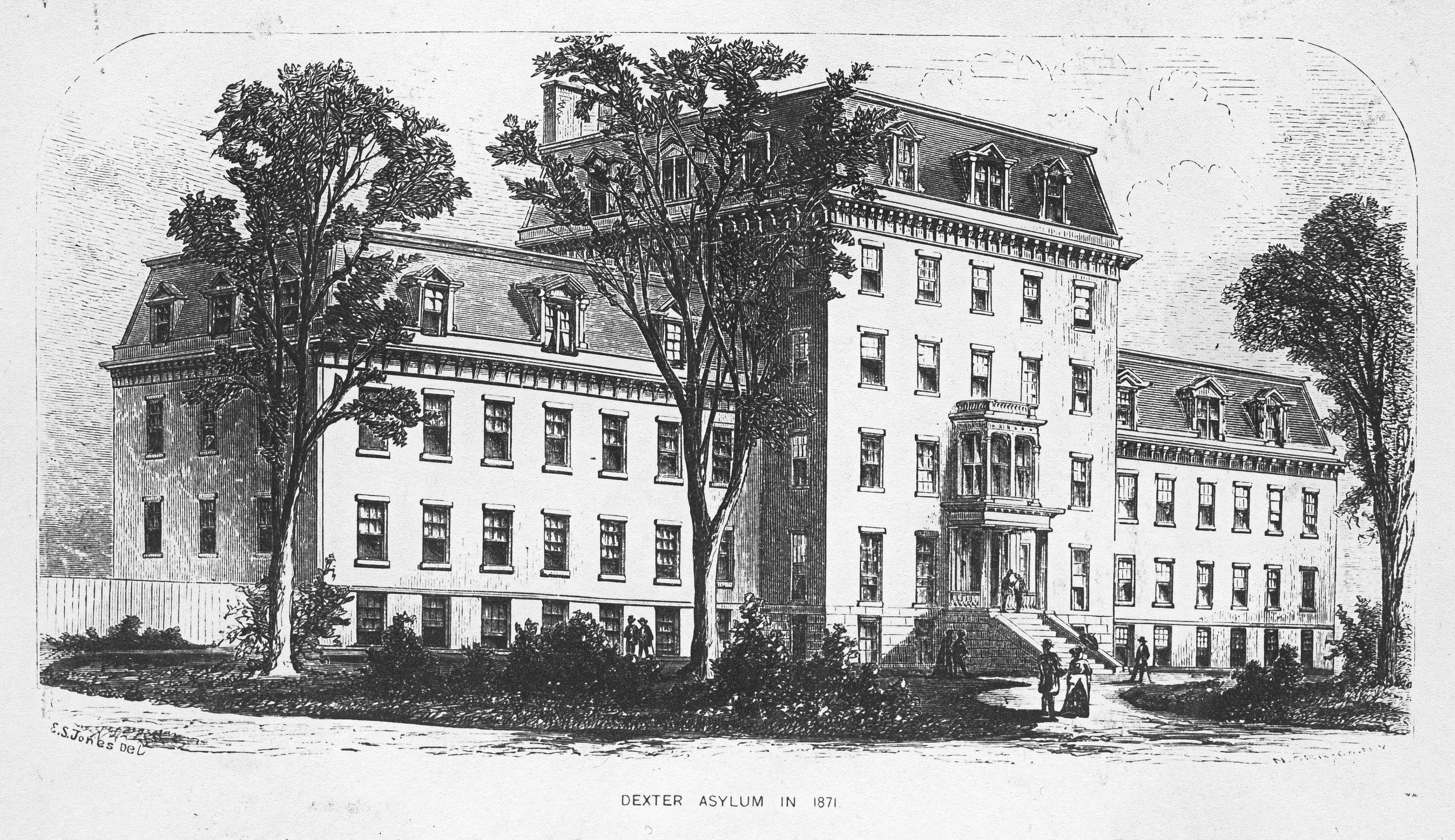
Dexter Asylum, 1871

Dexter's will required the town to build housing for the poor on the Neck Farm within five years and to enclose the farm with a stone wall within twenty, and it forbade the farm's sale or use for any other purpose. Town meetings of the freemen planned the poorhouse, and the town built it between 1826 and 1830 at a cost of more than $43,000. The Dexter Asylum began receiving residents in the summer of 1828, replacing Providence's practice of boarding the poor in private homes, under rules adopted by the freemen on July 26, 1828; the wall, 6,220 feet long, was finished about 1840. (Note: An 1887 Providence Journal history drawn from the city records gives completion in December 1839 at a cost of $12,691, paid from the city treasury; the city's website gives $12,700. Staples (1843), followed by the 1894 city report, gives 1840 and about $22,000.) Only the poor with a legal settlement in Providence were admitted.

The asylum was paid for out of the Donation rather than the town treasury. By 1850 the sale of farm produce covered more than half its budget, and the city itself contributed little beyond occasional capital costs. Its population peaked at about 190 in 1849 and settled at about 100 from the 1870s on. As the East Side grew around it, the farm stopped paying its way; vegetable farming was abandoned in 1928, and the asylum's deficits had to be covered from the Donation's other income.

In 1926, ruling on the city's request to divide part of the farm into house lots, the Rhode Island Supreme Court held in City of Providence v. Payne that the farm could not be sold or leased, but that if Dexter's scheme ceased to be useful, the Rhode Island Superior Court could modify it under the doctrine of cy-près. In 1947 the city petitioned the Superior Court for permission to sell the farm and to use the proceeds for the poor. Claimed heirs fought the case for a decade, in both state and federal courts, until the Rhode Island Supreme Court held in 1956 that Dexter had shown a general intent "for the amelioration of the condition of the poor of the city of Providence." On July 11, 1957, Judge Patrick P. Curran authorized the sale, calling the upkeep of the land for its 26 remaining residents "a woeful waste of wealth." At the sale by sealed bids on September 28, 1957, Brown University paid $1,000,777, the highest of five bids. The asylum buildings were demolished in 1958, and the site became Brown's athletic complex; much of the wall survives.

== Residuary estate ==
The eighteenth paragraph of the will gave the town the rest of Dexter's property to be kept as a permanent fund for the poor. In 1825 the town authorized the sale of all of it except the properties on North Main and Meeting streets. Shares in a theater, an 86-acre farm in Smithfield, and other parcels were sold, and the annuities charged on the estate ended in 1840. The largest remaining tract, on the East Side, had come to Dexter through his wife. In 1865 the commissioners agreed to a street, later named Doyle Avenue, along its boundary, and from 1870 they leased house lots there for forty-year terms rather than selling them, requiring tenants to pay the equivalent of property taxes and forbidding the sale of liquor.

In 1892 the Donation's holdings also included the "Tavern Estate" on North Main Street, a house on Meeting Street, and lots on Cranston, Harrison, Hammond and Bacon streets; several were rented to the city itself for schools and a fire station. That year the Donation took in $12,439 in rents, and by 1894 its properties yielded more than $16,000 a year. This income paid for the asylum, and by 1924 it was covering $20,000 of the asylum's annual deficit. The commission began selling its leased lots in 1908; most were sold in the 1920s as the leases expired, others in the 1950s, and the last, on Doyle Avenue, in 1986.

== The Dexter Donation and the Ebenezer Knight Dexter Trust ==
The Superior Court's final decree of July 18, 1957, which authorized the sale of the Neck Farm, required the proceeds to be held as the "Ebenezer Knight Dexter Trust Fund, City of Providence, trustee," and directed the city to spend the income, as far as possible, on the poor of Providence "by providing for them in their own home or such other place as might be desirable and by caring for them wherever found." The city could apply to the court for advice on investing and using the income, and placed the proceeds in Treasury bills in October 1957 while a permanent investment was arranged.

The new trust fund was kept separate from the original Donation, which the commissioners continued to administer; in 1959 the two held $993,517 and $551,920. With the asylum closed, the commissioners put the Donation's income toward city welfare costs, but by 1962 it was being held pending a court ruling on its use. In 1965 Mayor Joseph A. Doorley Jr. asked the Superior Court to let the city use the funds' income, which he called "idle," to join the federal surplus-food program, and by 1968 it was paying the administrative costs of the city's food stamp program.

In 1998, citing concerns that the Donation was not adequately supervised, Mayor Vincent A. Cianci Jr. had the commission hire an investment adviser to manage the funds, then worth $3.44 million. The funds are now overseen by the city's Board of Investment Commissioners, chaired by the mayor, and are still held as separate accounts; on March 31, 2026, the Dexter Donation fund was valued at $4,195,071 and the Ebenezer Knight Dexter Trust at $5,477,087.

The commission gives grants from the funds to nonprofit organizations serving the poor, which apply through the city clerk. In 2008 it awarded $272,750 to 143 organizations; most grants were $2,000 or less, and the largest was $70,000. It awarded a total of $270,000 in 2015 and $92,500 in 2016, and according to a 2025 account it more recently distributes $200,000 to $400,000 a year. (Note: The city's investment reports show $242,191 withdrawn from the Dexter Donation's account and $295,086 from the Ebenezer Knight Dexter Trust's in 2025, most of it in December; the reports do not state what the money was used for.)

== Bibliography ==
=== Court decisions ===
- City of Providence v. Payne, 47 R.I. 444, 134 A. 276 (R.I. 1926).
- Payne v. City of Providence, 182 F.2d 888 (1st Cir. 1950).
- City of Providence v. Powers, 83 R.I. 512 (R.I. 1956).

=== Books, reports and official publications ===
- City of Providence (1894). "Sixty-ninth Annual Report of the Dexter Donation". Providence City Documents for the Year 1893. Vol. 1. Providence: Snow & Farnham, City Printers – via Internet Archive.
- City of Providence (1894). Report of the Exercises at the Dedication of the Statue of Ebenezer Knight Dexter, Presented to the City of Providence by Henry C. Clark, Esq., June 29, 1894. Providence: Snow & Farnham, City Printers – via HathiTrust.
- City of Providence (1914). "Chapter 17: Dexter Training Ground". In Chaffee, Alfred G. (ed.). General Ordinances of the City of Providence and the Rules of the Board of Aldermen, as Revised in the Year 1914. Providence: Providence Printing Company.
- Conley, Patrick T. (2023). The Makers of Modern Rhode Island. Charleston, SC: The History Press. ISBN 9781467154024.
- Rhode Island Historical Preservation Commission (1989). National Register of Historic Places Inventory–Nomination Form: Doyle Avenue Historic District (PDF) (Report).
- Morris, Andrew (February 1998). "The Problem of Poverty: Public Relief and Reform in Postbellum Providence" (PDF). Rhode Island History. 56 (1): 3–19.
- Newman, Etan (2010). "For Whose Benefit?: Social Control and the Construction of Providence's Dexter Asylum". The Historian. 72 (1): 96–121. doi:10.1111/j.1540-6563.2009.00258.x. JSTOR 24455007.
- Staples, William R. (1843). Annals of the Town of Providence, from Its First Settlement, to the Organization of the City Government, in June, 1832. Providence: Knowles and Vose – via HathiTrust.

=== Board of Investment Commissioners records ===
- City of Providence, Board of Investment Commissioners (January 22, 2026). Regular Meeting: Minutes Packet (Report). Includes Segal Marco Advisors, City of Providence Trust Funds: Analysis of Investment Performance, Period Ending December 31, 2025.
- City of Providence, Board of Investment Commissioners (April 23, 2026). Regular Meeting: Minutes Packet (Report). Includes Segal Marco Advisors, City of Providence Trust Funds: Analysis of Investment Performance, Period Ending March 31, 2026.

=== Newspapers ===
- Barbarisi, Daniel (April 9, 2008). "Nonprofit agencies reap $272,000 from Dexter fund". The Providence Journal. p. D1 – via NewsBank.
- Bolan, Robert P. (October 26, 1941). "The Durable Benevolence of Ebenezer Knight Dexter: The Asylum's Real Story Disputes Prevailing Ideas". The Providence Sunday Journal. sec. VI, p. 4 – via America's Historical Newspapers (NewsBank).
- Camacho, Roseanne (February 26, 2025). "Two Sides of Ebenezer Knight Dexter's Donation". The Providence Eye.
- "Dexter Asylum". Evening Bulletin. Providence. January 5, 1925 – via America's Historical Newspapers (NewsBank).
- "Asylum Proceeds to Start Dexter Trust Fund". Evening Bulletin. Providence. July 18, 1957 – via America's Historical Newspapers (NewsBank).
- "Dexter Donation Report Presented". Evening Bulletin. Providence. October 26, 1962 – via America's Historical Newspapers (NewsBank).
- Griffin, Sharon (March 18, 1987). "Dexter trust fund is $46,215 in debt; a year needed to clear up commitments". The Providence Journal. p. C1 – via NewsBank.
- Li, Sophia (February 26, 2009). "The East Side's untold story". The Brown Daily Herald.
- McGowan, Dan (October 31, 2016). "Common Cause calls foul over obscure Providence election". WPRI-TV.
- "Dexter Donation: History of the Charity Founded by E. Knight Dexter". The Providence Journal. January 25, 1887. p. 8 – via America's Historical Newspapers (NewsBank).
- "Dexter Asylum Case in 5th Year". The Providence Journal. December 18, 1951 – via America's Historical Newspapers (NewsBank).
- "The Dexter Bequest Is Given New Meaning". The Providence Journal (Editorial). July 15, 1957 – via America's Historical Newspapers (NewsBank).
- "City Invests $1,000,777". The Providence Journal. October 12, 1957 – via America's Historical Newspapers (NewsBank).
- "Dexter Fund Group Meets". The Providence Journal. October 25, 1959 – via America's Historical Newspapers (NewsBank).
- "Doorley to Testify on Dexter Fund Use". The Providence Journal. March 24, 1965. p. 24 – via America's Historical Newspapers (NewsBank).
- "Doorley to Seek Dexter Cash for Health Centers". The Providence Journal. April 11, 1968 – via America's Historical Newspapers (NewsBank).
- "City Journal: Poverty-relief fund in line for help". The Providence Journal. August 9, 1998. p. C8 – via NewsBank.
- "City of Providence: The Ninth Annual Report of the City of Providence". Providence Journal. October 26, 1833 – via America's Historical Newspapers (NewsBank).
- "The News". Evening Bulletin. Providence. August 4, 1863 – via America's Historical Newspapers (NewsBank).

=== Websites and archival guides ===
- City of Providence. "Dexter Donation Proposal". City of Providence.
- Knights, Edwin M. "Dexter Donation: Ebenezer Knight Dexter's Enduring Gift to Providence". City of Providence.
- Kulpa, Kathryn (1991). "Dexter Asylum Records, 1828–1956 (MSS 67)". Rhode Island Historical Society.
- Smithsonian Institution. "Ebenezer Knight Dexter, (sculpture)". Smithsonian American Art Museum, Inventories of American Painting and Sculpture.
