= William S. Hayward =

American politician (1835–1900)

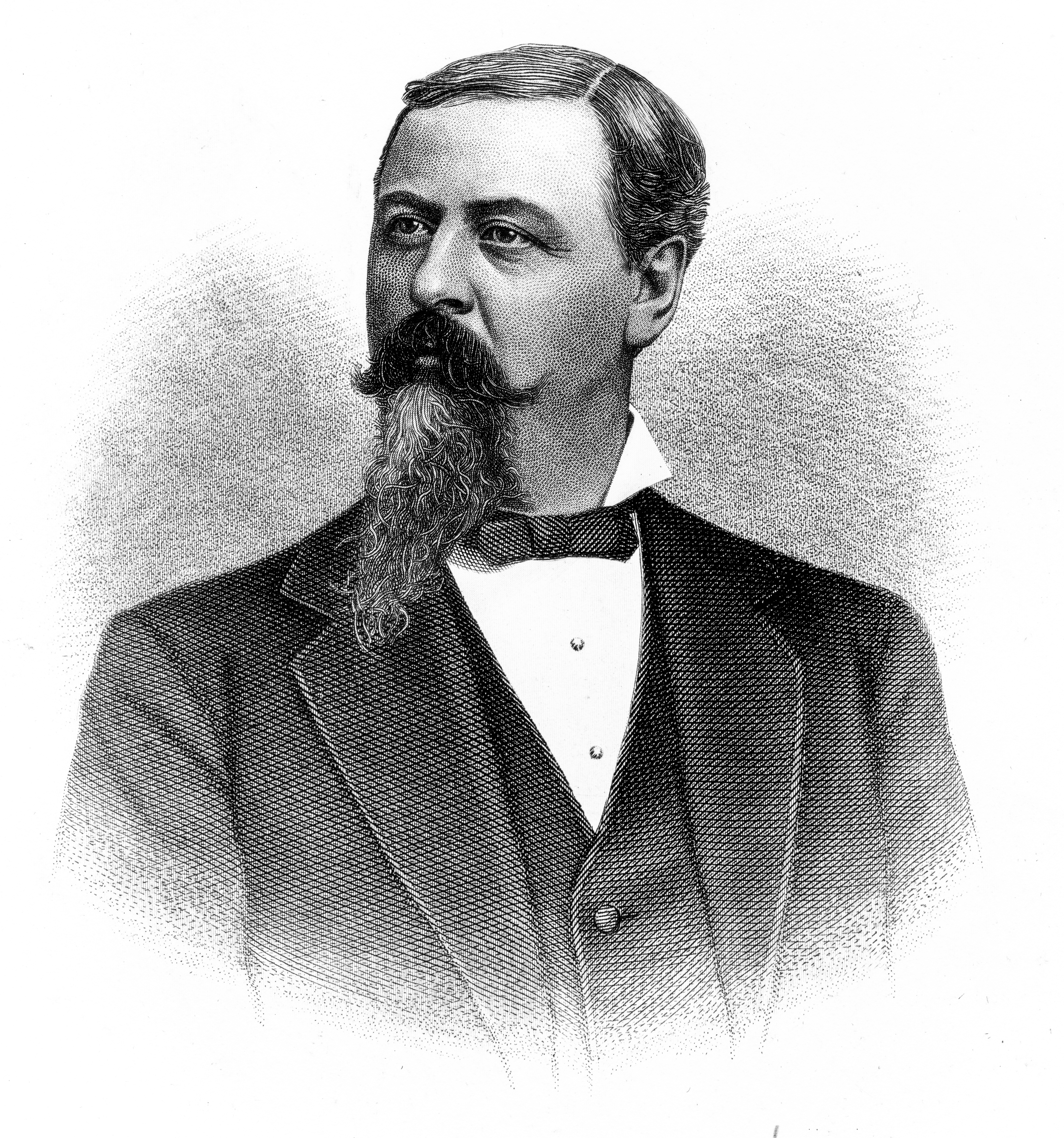

12th Mayor of Providence, Rhode Island
- In office January 1881 – January 1884
- Preceded by: Thomas A. Doyle
- Succeeded by: Thomas A. Doyle

Personal details
- Born: February 26, 1835 Foster, Rhode Island, US
- Died: November 5, 1900 (aged 65) Providence, Rhode Island, US
- Resting place: Swan Point Cemetery
- Party: Republican
- Spouse: Lucy Maria Rice
- Known for: Mayor of Providence, Rhode Island
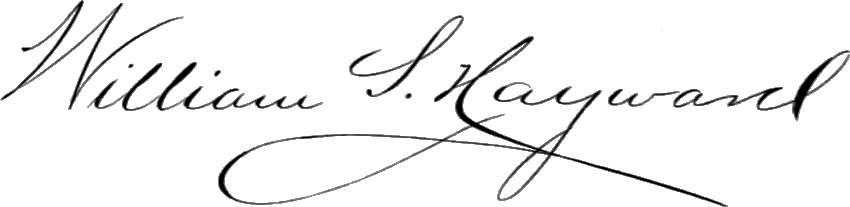
- Signature

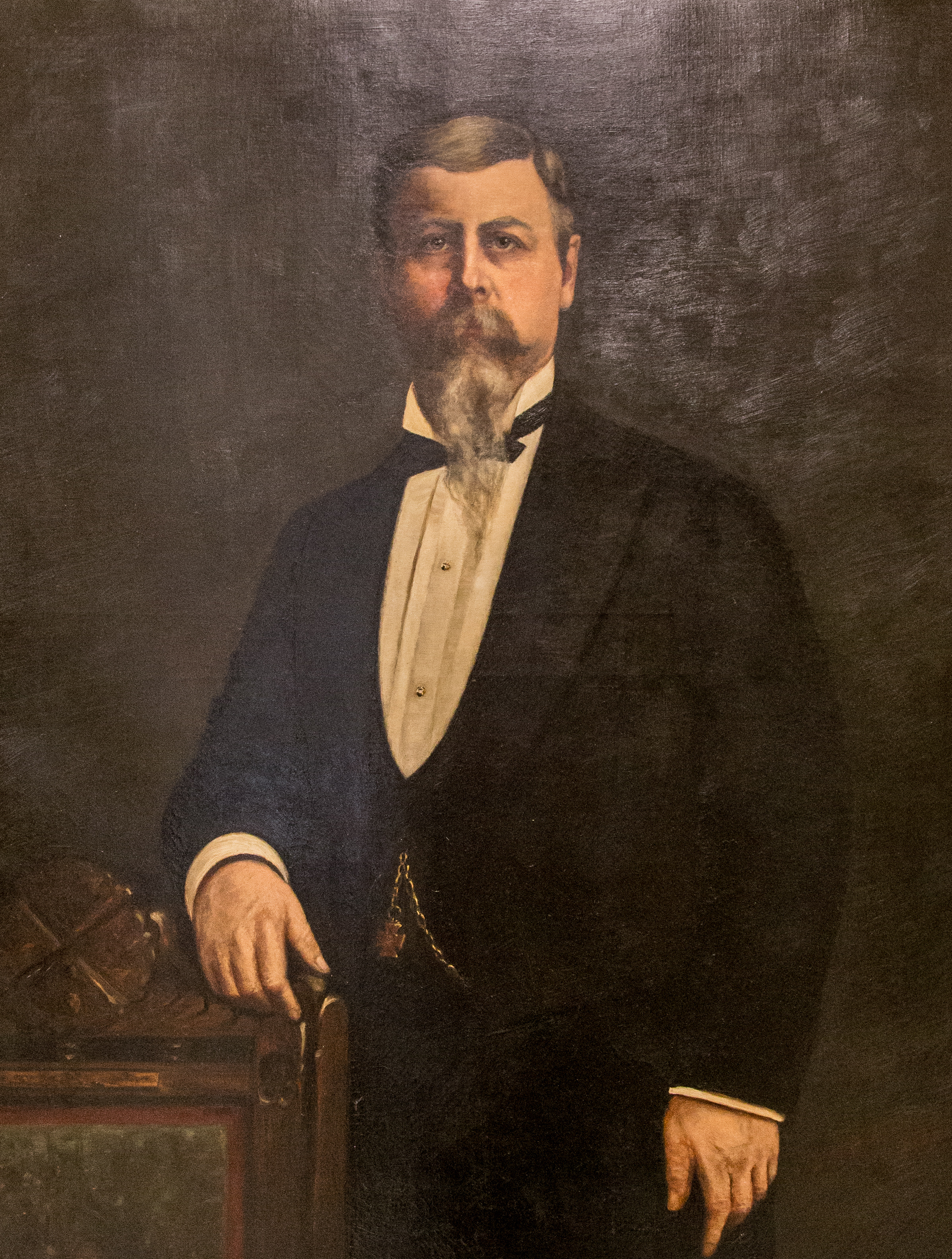
Official portrait in Providence City Hall

William S. Hayward (February 26, 1835 – November 5, 1900) was an American banker, baker, and politician who served as mayor of Providence, Rhode Island, from 1881 until 1884.

== Early life ==
Hayward was "born and reared a poor boy" in Foster, Rhode Island. As a young man, he attended public schools and worked on a farm.

== Baker ==
Hayward moved to Providence 1851. He was hired as an employee of bakery Rice & Hayward, which was owned by Mr. Fitz James Rice and Mr. George W. Hayward. He left the firm for a year, then returned as a salesman until 1858; then moved up to the delivery department, supplying out-of-town customers. In 1860, Hayward became a member of the firm, and the name was changed to Rice, Hayward & Company.

In 1861, at the start of the Civil War, Hayward moved to Washington, D.C., and opened another bakery branch called "Rhode Island Bakery". It supplied biscuits to soldiers stationed in Washington, D.C. When soldiers moved out of District of Columbia into Virginia early in the war, Howard sold the District of Columbia location at a loss and returned to Providence.

By 1863 Hayward bought out the business and became full owner of Rice Hayward, & Co. He later partnered again with Fitz James Rice. The company was successful. They supplied biscuits to the Union Army stationed in Rhode Island during the Civil War and grew into one of the largest bakeries in New England.

== Politician ==
1872 Elected to the Common Council from the Sixth Ward, and was re-elected until in 1876 he was elected to the Board of Aldermen. He served as President of the Board of Aldermen from 1878 to 1880.

He was elected mayor of Providence in 1880 and held the post for three years, but declined to run for re-election in 1884. During his years in office, the city's debt was reduced by nearly $600,000.

Hayward was also a member of the board of State Charities and Corrections; commissioner of the City Sinking Fund; and a commissioner of Dexter Asylum.

== Banker ==
Hayward was co-founder of Citizens Savings Bank in 1871, along with his bakery partners Fitz James Rice and George Hayward. He was president of the Union Trust Bank of Providence, and a director of the Eagle National and Citizens Savings Banks.

== Personal life ==
Hayward married Lucy Maria Rice in 1859. She was the daughter of Fitz James Rice, Hayward's business partner in the bakery and fellow founder of Citizens Savings Bank.

Hayward was described as "a man of fine physique, and of commanding presence, standing over six feet, two inches in height, and weighing two hundred and twenty pounds".

Hayward was a member of What Cheer Lodge of Masons, and a member of the Union Congregational Church on Broad Street.

He died of Bright's disease after an illness of eight days and is buried in Swan Point Cemetery.

== Memorials ==
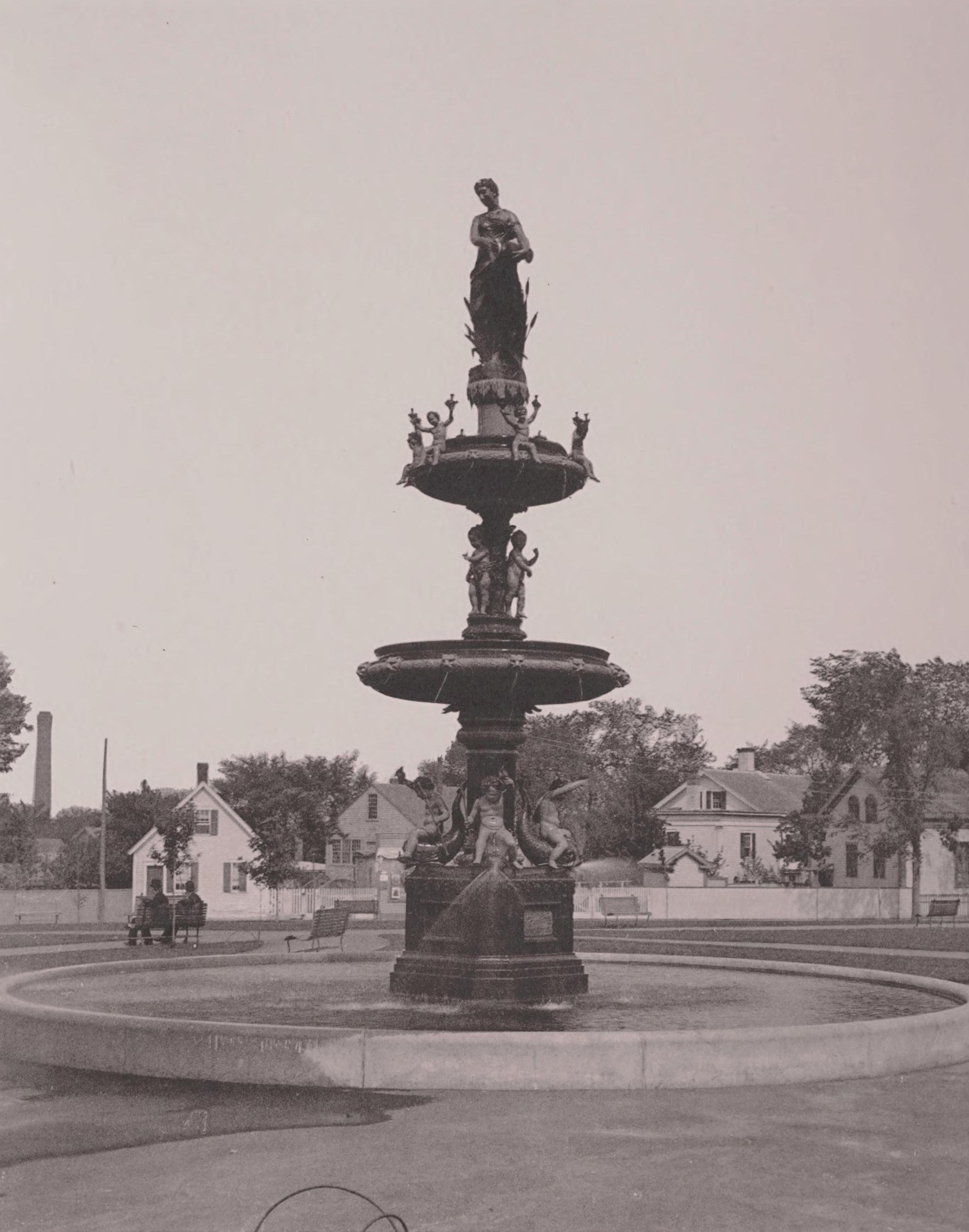
Hayward Park Fountain

Sixth Avenue Park, in Providence, was renamed Hayward Park in his honor in 1889. The park was demolished for construction of the interchange for Interstate 95 and Interstate 195.

Political offices
Preceded by Thomas A. Doyle	Mayor of Providence; 1881–1884	Succeeded by Thomas A. Doyle
