= George L. Clarke =

American politician

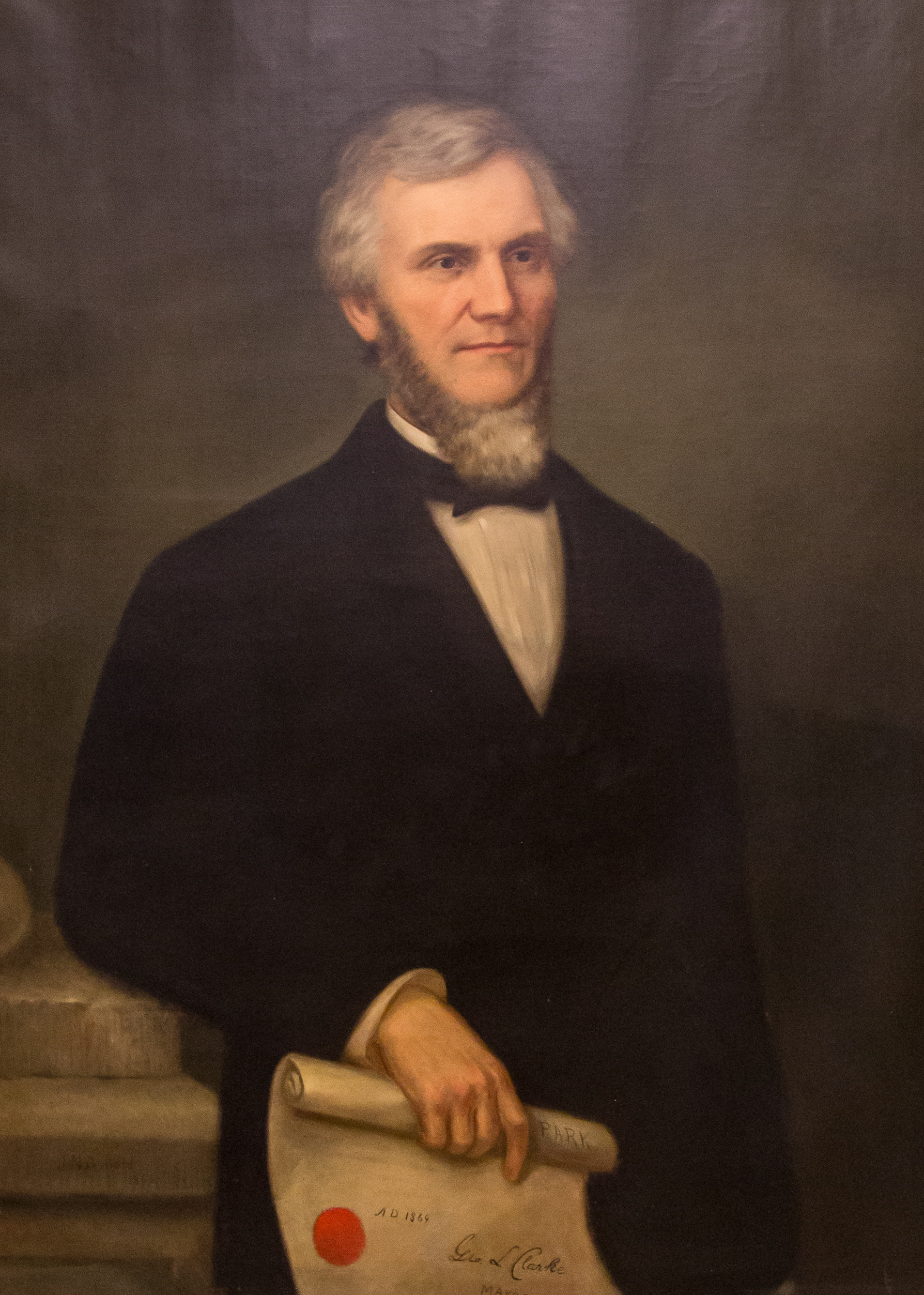
- George L. Clarke, official portrait in Providence City Hall

10th Mayor of Providence, Rhode Island
- In office June 7, 1869 – June 6, 1870
- Preceded by: Thomas A. Doyle
- Succeeded by: Thomas A. Doyle

Personal details
- Born: George Leonard Clarke; August 10, 1813 Norton, Massachusetts, U.S.
- Died: February 11, 1890 (aged 76)
- Resting place: Swan Point Cemetery
- Party: Liberty Party; Free Soil Party; Republican
- Spouse: Frances Alice Chace
- Known for: Mayor of Providence, Rhode Island

George Leonard Clarke (August 10, 1813 – February 11, 1890) was an American politician who served as the 10th mayor of Providence, Rhode Island from June 1869 until June 1870.

== Early life ==
George L. Clarke was born in Norton, Massachusetts. His parents were Reverend Pitt Clarke, a well-known pastor of the First Congregational Society in Newtown, and Maria (Simpson) Clarke. His schooling was a combination of home schooling from his parents; a few months spent at a public school in Norton; and "one or two quarters" in a private academy. Upon turning 16, he left school and worked in a store in Providence. He supplemented his education by attending public lectures known as "Lyceum Lectures". Clarke was a staunch and outspoken abolitionist from an early age, and became well-known throughout the state for his anti-slavery views, even in a time when such views were not popular.

== Political career ==
Clarke was first a member of the Liberty Party which later became the Free Soil Party. When that became absorbed into the Republican Party in 1854, Clarke became a Republican.

He served in the State House of Representatives in 1856 to 1858, then again in 1863-1868. He was Speaker of the House for the last two of those years. He was elected to the State Senate in April 1869.

A month after Clarke's election to State Senate, Providence's popular mayor Thomas A. Doyle left the Republican Party to run as an independent. The Republican party drafted Clarke to run against him. Clarke won in a three-way race, but Doyle returned to defeat Clarke the following year, winning by a two-to-one margin. During Clarke's time as mayor, a system of fire alarm boxes were installed in Providence. The Sockanosset Reservoir was begun, and Dexter Asylum was enlarged. A major hurricane struck the city on September 8, 1869, which caused much damage and flooding in downtown Providence.

After his mayorship, Clarke was elected to the Board of Aldermen from the First Ward. Later he became president of the City Fire Insurance Company.

== Personal life ==
Clarke married Frances Alice Chace, daughter of a textile firm owner. Clarke went to work at the firm, William A. Chace and Company. The couple lived at 95 Angell Street in Providence's east side.

Political offices
Preceded by Thomas A. Doyle	Mayor of Providence; 1869–1870	Succeeded by Thomas A. Doyle
