= Sarah Elizabeth Doyle =

American educator and educational reformer

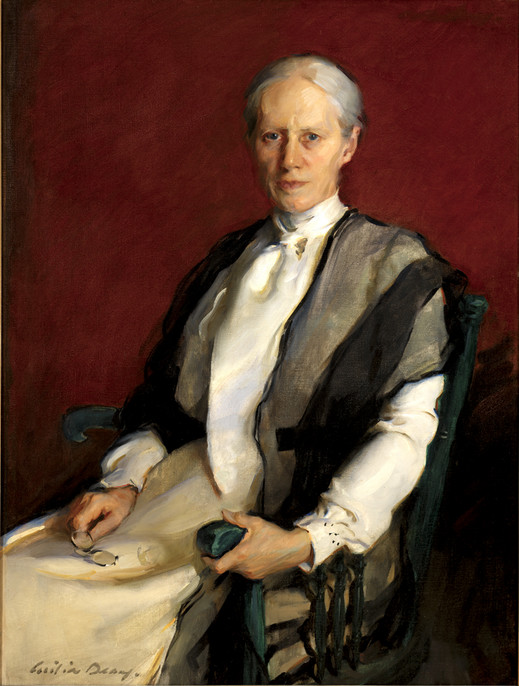
- Sarah Doyle painted by Cecilia Beaux
- Born: March 22, 1830; Providence, Rhode Island, United States
- Died: December 21, 1922 (aged 92)
- Resting place: Swan Point Cemetery
- Occupations: Educator and reformer
- Known for: Leading the campaign to admit women to Brown University
- Relatives: Mayor Thomas A. Doyle (brother)

Sarah Elizabeth Doyle (March 22, 1830 – December 21, 1922) was an American educator and educational reformer, noted for her roles in founding the Rhode Island School of Design and establishing women's education at Brown University.

== Early life ==
Sarah Elizabeth Doyle was born in Providence in 1830, the third of seven children to Martha Dorrance Doyle and Thomas Doyle, a bookbinder. She graduated from Providence High School in 1846 and began her career as a teacher in 1856.

== Rhode Island School of Design ==
Doyle was a charter member of the corporation of the Rhode Island School of Design and served as secretary from 1877 to 1899.

== Pembroke College ==
Sarah Doyle is perhaps best known for leading the campaign to admit women to Brown University. In 1891, the first six female students were allowed to enroll as undergraduates. By 1895, Doyle formed the Rhode Island Society for the Collegiate Education of Women for the purpose of raising the funds for a full Women's College at Brown. The group raised $75,000 to erect Pembroke Hall, the first permanent building of the Brown Women's College, later renamed Pembroke College.

== Other achievements ==
Doyle served as the Girls' Principal at Providence High School from 1878 until her retirement in 1892. She was active in a number of Rhode Island organizations, including the Rhode Island Women's Club, which she founded in 1876, the Providence Athenaeum, the Rhode Island Institute of Instruction. In 1898, Providence mayor William C. Baker named Doyle as secretary of a commission of five members to investigate the management of public schools.

== Death and burial ==
Doyle died on December 21, 1922, at her home at 119 Prospect Street in Providence. Her health had been declining for some time. Her funeral was held at the First Congregational Church (now First Unitarian Church) on Benefit Street. She is buried in a family plot in Swan Point Cemetery.

== Tributes and recognition ==
- She was the first woman to receive an honorary degree from Brown University in 1894
- Sarah Doyle was honored during her own life through the Sarah E. Doyle Club, created by her students in 1894.
- In 1975, Brown University established the Sarah Doyle Women's Center.
- Doyle was inducted into the Rhode Island Heritage Hall of Fame in 2005.
