= Thomas A. Doyle (mayor) =

American politician

Thomas Arthur Doyle
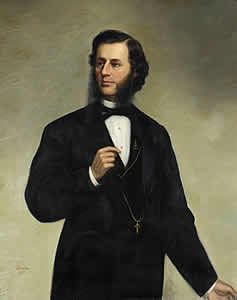
- 1871 portrait of Doyle

9th, 11th, & 13th Mayor of Providence, Rhode Island
- In office June 1864 – June 1869
- Preceded by: Jabez C. Knight
- Succeeded by: George L. Clarke
- In office June 1870 – June 1881
- Preceded by: George L. Clarke
- Succeeded by: William S. Hayward
- In office January 1884 – June 9, 1886
- Preceded by: William S. Hayward
- Succeeded by: Gilbert F. Robbins

Personal details
- Born: March 15, 1827 Providence, Rhode Island, U.S.
- Died: June 9, 1886 (aged 59) Providence, Rhode Island, U.S.
- Resting place: Swan Point Cemetery
- Party: Republican
- Spouse: Almyra Sprague
- Relations: Sarah Elizabeth Doyle (sister)
- Known for: Longest-serving mayor of Providence, Rhode Island, at that time
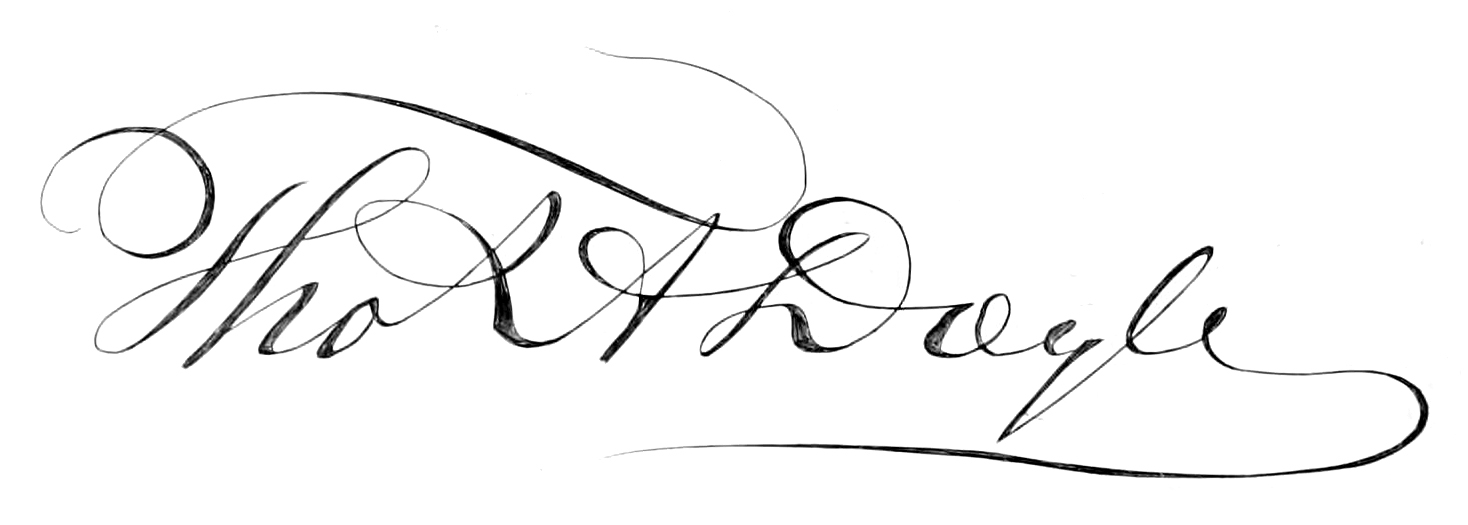
- Signature

Thomas Arthur Doyle (March 15, 1827 – June 9, 1886) was mayor of Providence for three intervals (each made up of one-year terms): 1864–1869; 1870–1881; and from 1884 until his death in office in 1886. His eighteen years in office was the longest until Vincent "Buddy" Cianci, over 100 years later.

== Early life ==
Thomas Arthur Doyle was born March 15, 1827, in Providence, Rhode Island, to Thomas Doyle and Martha Jones. The family was of Irish Protestant heritage. He was one of seven children, among them his sister, educator and reformer Sarah Doyle. Their father died when Thomas was young.

He attended Elm Street Grammar School, a public school. At age 14, he joined the counting-room of Benjamin Cozzens Esq., a lawyer, manufacturer, and calico printer. Doyle clerked there and at a few other jobs, including cashier, stockbroker, and real estate auctioneer.

== Political career ==
Doyle began his political career in 1848, aged 21, when he was elected ward clerk for the Sixth Ward. In 1852 he was elected to the common council from the Fifth Ward. Doyle also served on the school committee, at one time being the youngest member of the committee.

== Tenure as mayor ==
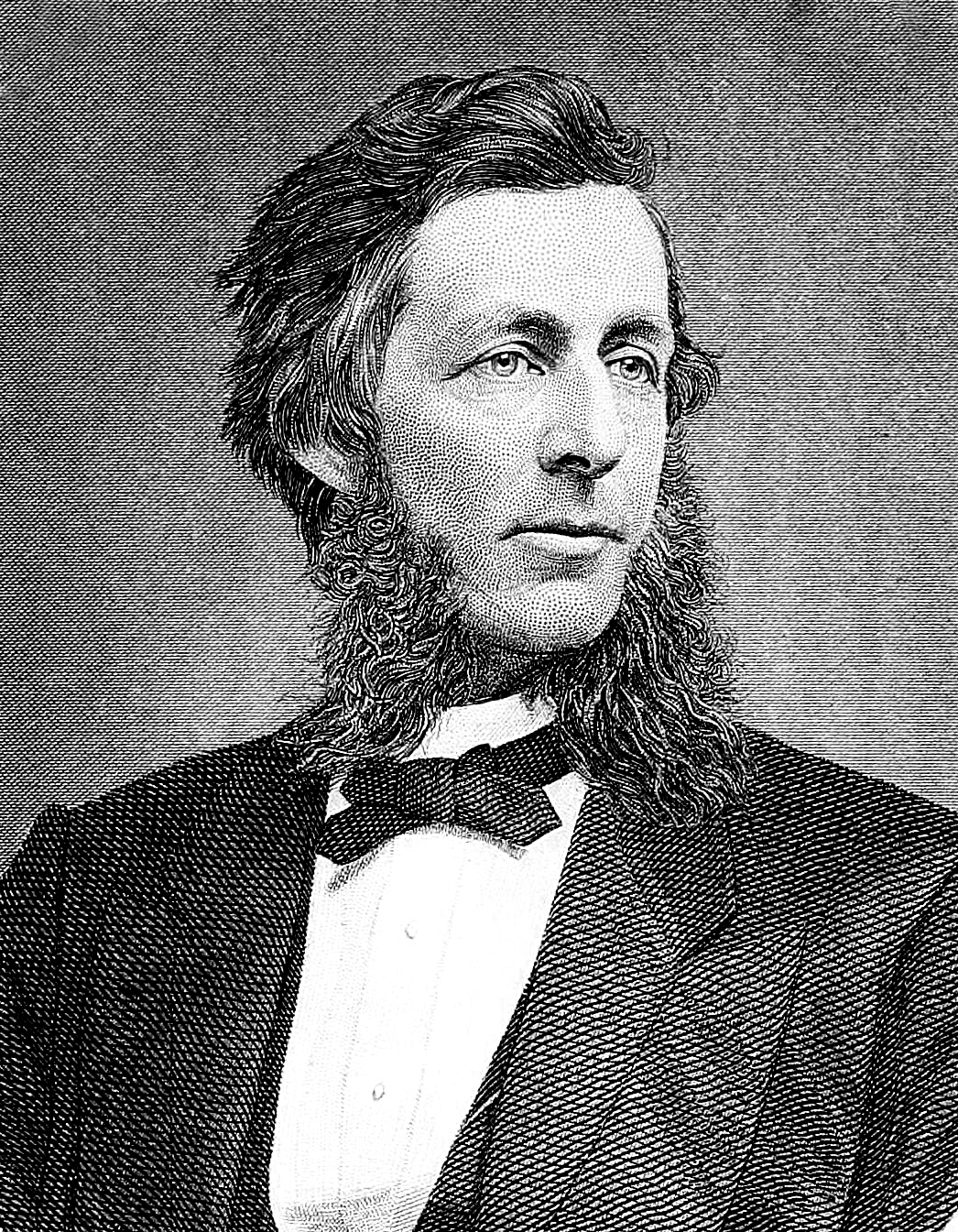
Engraving

Doyle is considered by some historians and even was regarded in his lifetime to have been one of Providence's greatest mayors. During his tenure Providence grew from "a large manufacturing village" to a "little metropolis". Doyle was instrumental in leading Providence to become a modern city.

Doyle was known for his individuality. He had a reputation for being straightforward and opinionated. At one time or another he alienated everyone from Democrats to Republicans to taxpayers to the press to city departments, often advocating unpopular policies. His relationship with the city council was often stormy; they were said to be in "hearty disagreement on almost everything" and he often exercised the veto power. He spent a lot of money, increased debt, and raised taxes. Yet he earned respect for being honest and running an administration free from corruption.

Some specific achievements of his terms of office included:

- Construction of Providence City Hall was completed in 1878
- Introduction of a uniformed police force, which became a model for other cities
- Introduction of a fire alarm signal system in December 1870
- Construction of a municipal water system which drew water from the Pawtuxet River was introduced in December 1870
- A comprehensive sewer system, which emptied into the river and harbor, was begun in 1872
- The school system was improved and expanded, and many schoolhouses built, including the English High School in 1878
- Acquisition of Roger Williams Park through donation (1871)
- The city population grew from 54,000 to 120,000
- The city took on large amounts of debt
- Doyle began a complete makeover of railroad approaches to Providence, including eliminating grade crossings and constructing a much larger Union Station. These efforts were not completed until after Doyle's death.

== Personal life ==
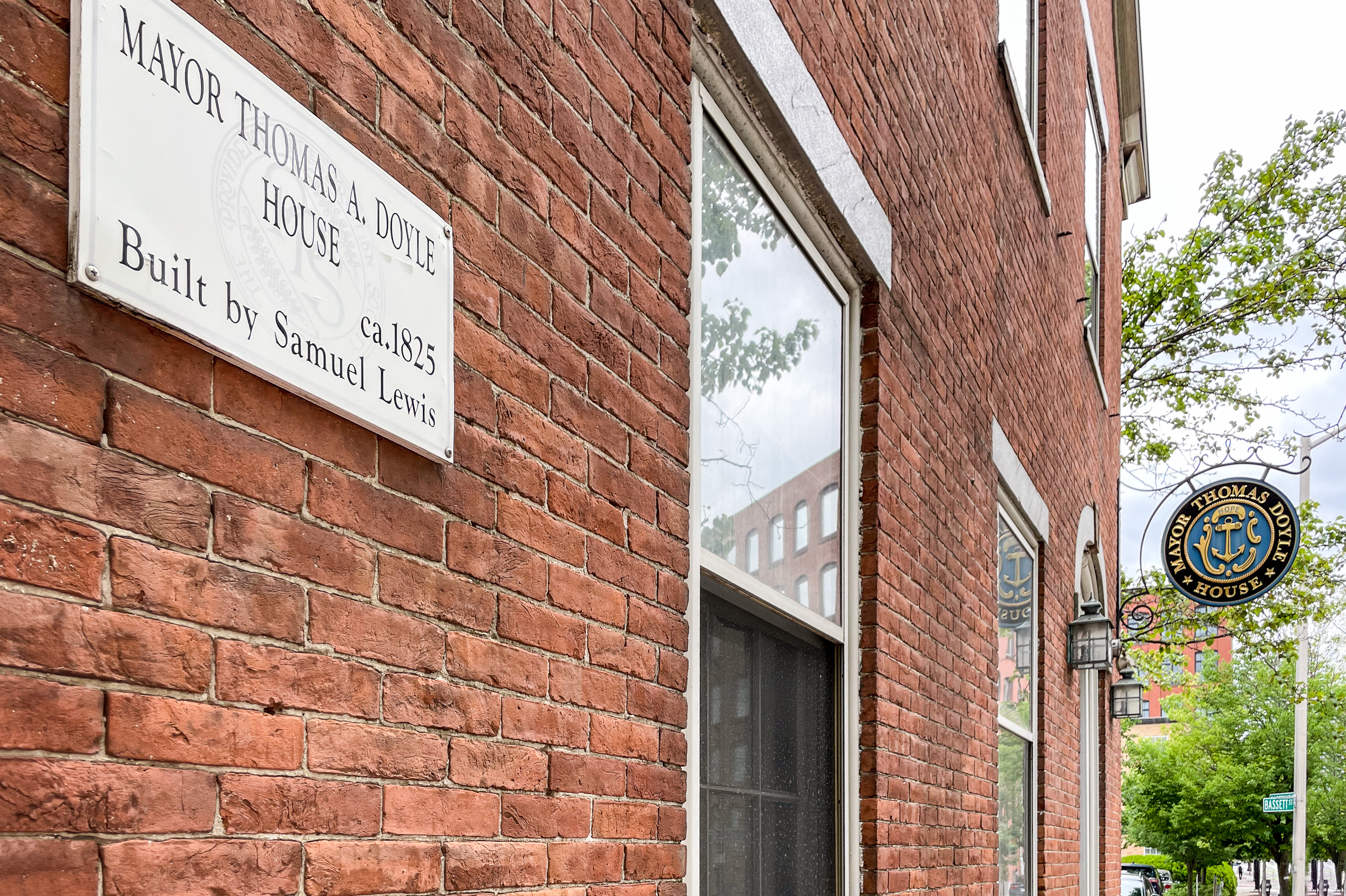
Thomas A. Doyle House

In 1869, he married Almyra Sprague, sister of Senator William Sprague. They had no children. His house at 137 Chestnut Street in Providence's Jewelry District, stands today.

Doyle was a member of the Unitarian church. He was also an enthusiastic Mason. He was made a Master Mason in 1857, and was elected to various statewide Masonic offices including Knights Templar.

== Death, memorial, and burial ==
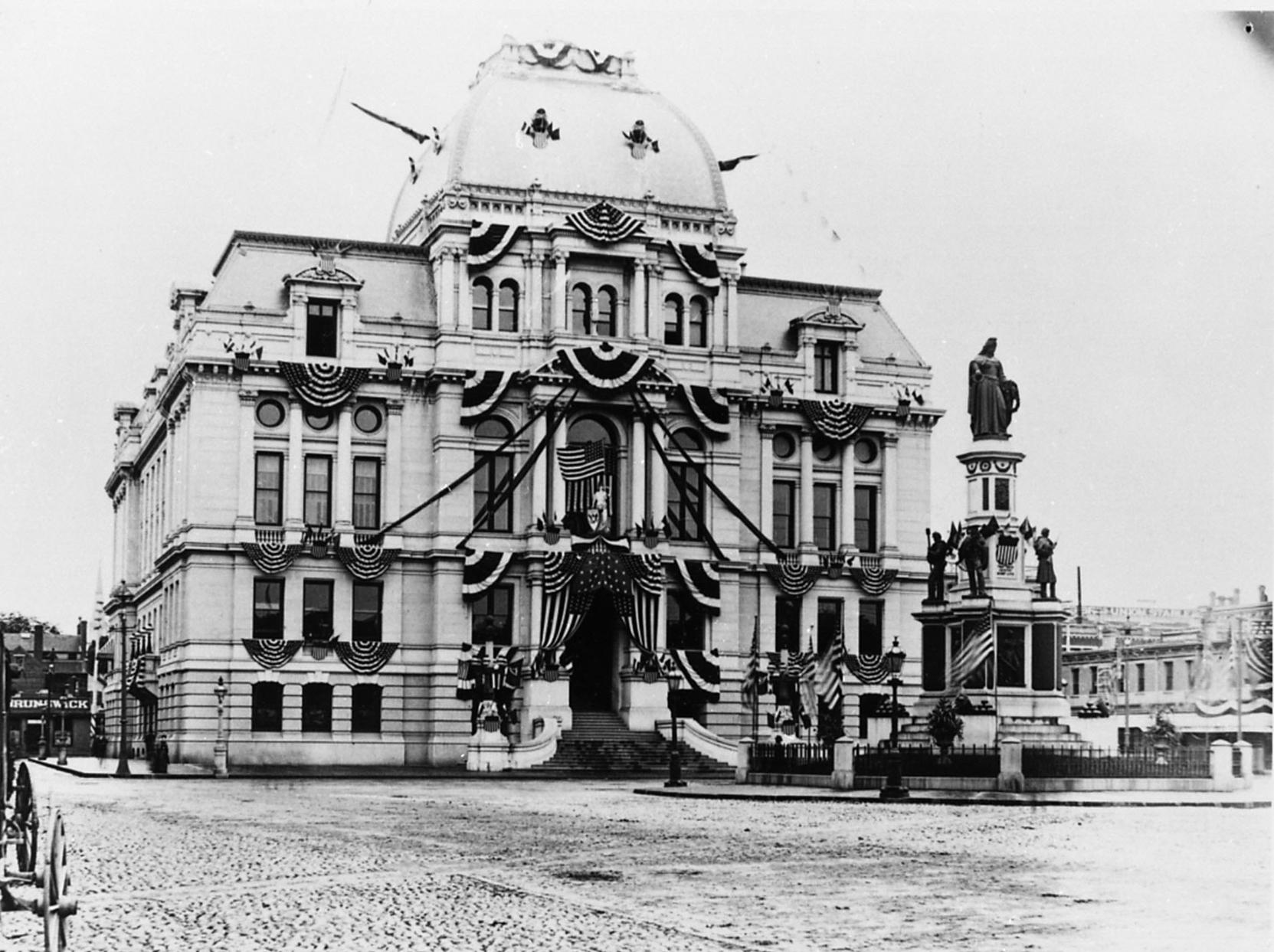
Providence City Hall was decorated for Doyle's public wake

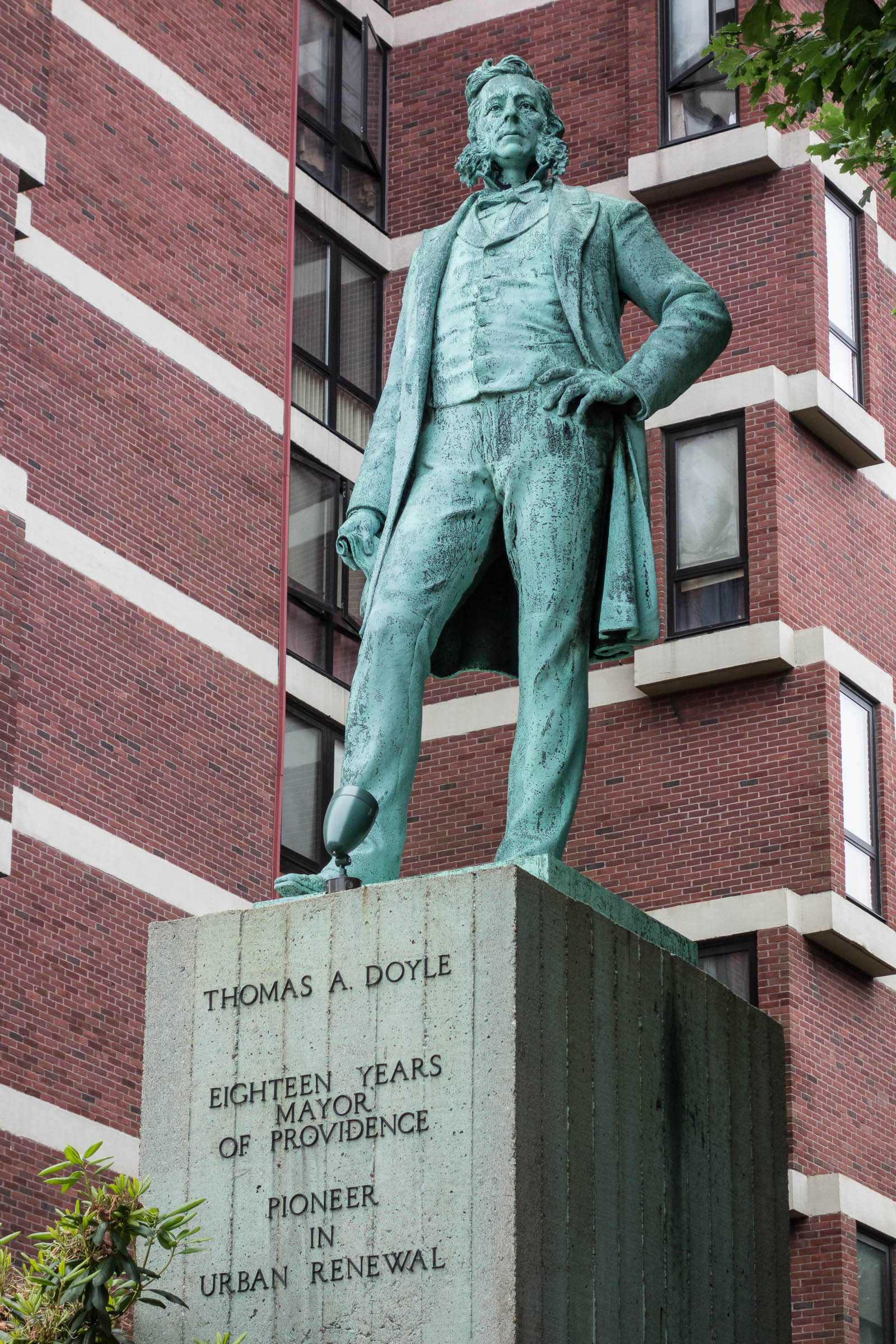
This bronze Statue of Thomas A. Doyle, originally installed at Cathedral Square, was moved to the corner of Chestnut and Broad Street in 1967.

Doyle suffered a stroke on the evening of June 6, 1886, while still in office. The "entire right side of his body" was reportedly paralyzed. He died at his house on Wednesday June 9, 1886.

On Saturday the 12th, his body was escorted by the First Light Infantry from his home to City Hall, where he lie in state. Thousands of people came to the City Hall to silently pay their respects. Doyle is believed to be the last mayor to be honored with a wake at City Hall until Buddy Cianci, 130 years later.

Gilbert F. Robbins was named acting mayor, and he issued a proclamation that on the following Monday June 14, all business in the city should be closed from noon to 3:00 PM. On that day a large procession carried his body from City Hall to the First Congregational Church for services, then on to Swan Point Cemetery for burial.

== Recognition ==
- A statue of Doyle by Henry Hudson Kitson was erected on June 3, 1889, in Cathedral Square, near the Roman Catholic Cathedral of Sts. Peter and Paul. It was moved in 1967 to the intersection of Broad and Chestnut Street.
- Doyle Avenue, on Providence's East Side, was named for him.
- Doyle was inducted into the Rhode Island Heritage Hall of Fame in 2004.

Political offices
Preceded by Jabez C. Knight	Mayor of Providence; 1864–1869	Succeeded by George L. Clarke
Preceded by George L. Clarke	Mayor of Providence; 1870–1881	Succeeded by William S. Hayward
Preceded by William S. Hayward	Mayor of Providence; 1884–1886	Succeeded by Gilbert F. Robbins
