= Sarah Doyle Center for Women and Gender =

Center at Brown University in Rhode Island, US

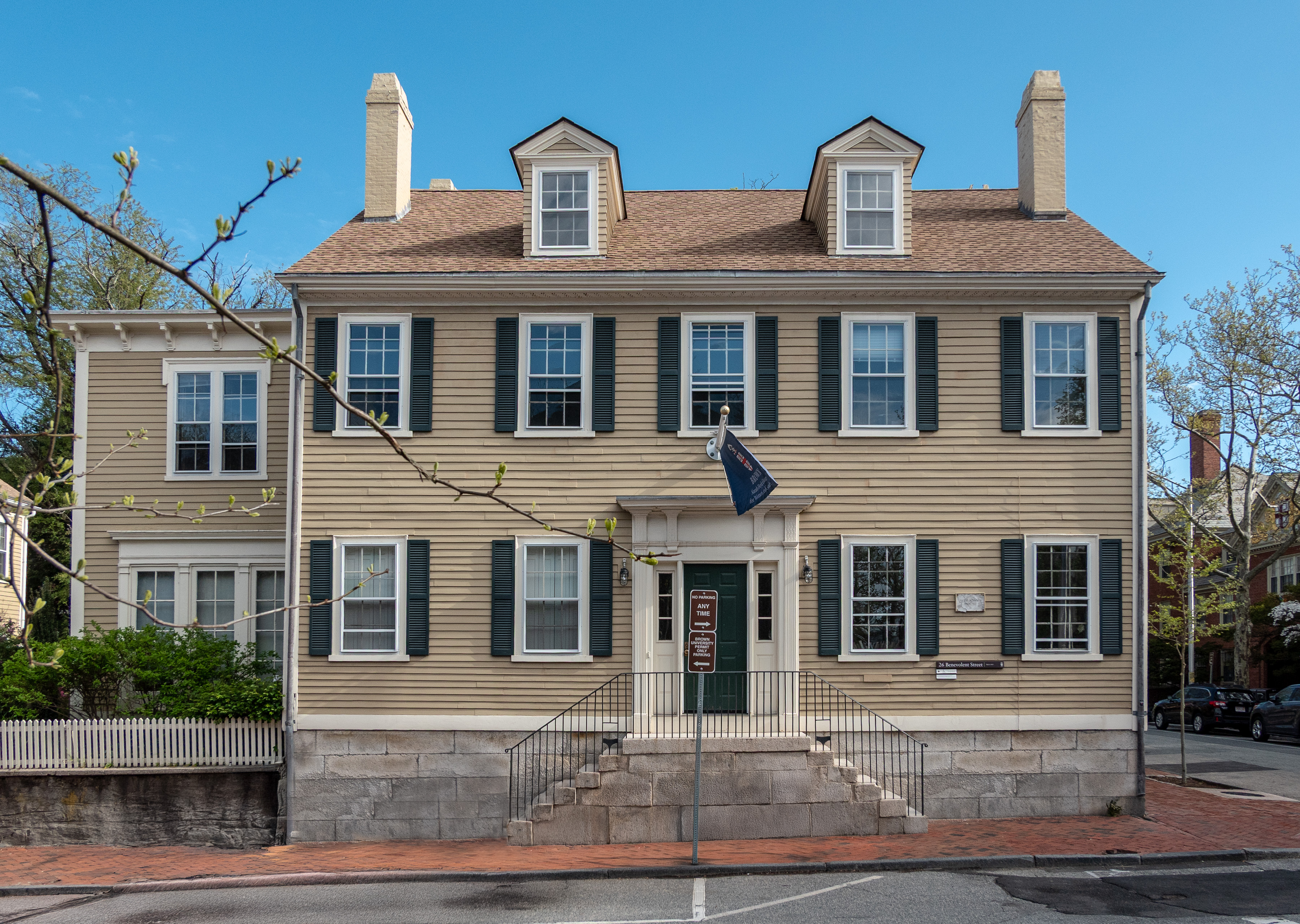
Sarah Doyle Women's Center, 26 Benevolent Street

The Sarah Doyle Center for Women and Gender (SDCWG), formerly the Sarah Doyle Women's Center, is a center at Brown University, which "seeks to provide a comfortable, yet challenging place for students, faculty, and staff to examine the multitude of issues around gender". It was named in honor of the prominent Rhode Island educator, Sarah Doyle. The SDCWG was established in 1974 as the Sarah Doyle Women's Center at the Sarah Doyle house at 185 Meeting Street. It moved to 26 Benevolent Street in 2001 to make way for construction of the Sidney E. Frank Hall for Life Sciences.

The SDCWG offers services and programs, and meeting space for university and community groups. The SDCWG houses an art gallery, an extensive library and resource center, a zine collection, and a student lounge. It is affiliated with the Pembroke Center for Teaching and Research on Women.

== The Sarah Doyle Gallery ==
The Sarah Doyle Gallery is a professional art gallery within the Center. It exhibits six to seven juried shows a year, and an annual commencement show. The goal of the gallery is to expose Brown students to high quality professional artwork on campus. The gallery openings offer a chance to interact with the artists, ask them questions, and occasionally enjoy talk from the artists. Artists shown in 2019 include Lo Smith, Satpreet Kahlon, and Lois Harada.

== Women's History Series ==
Centering on March for Women's History Month, the Center organizes a series of speakers and events centering around a particular theme in Women's History. Events often overlap with other centers at the university and bring activists, academics, artists, and other thinkers and performance from beyond Providence to generate rich conversations around intersectional feminism. Past themes include Remixing Storytelling: Gender, Media, and Creative Expressions; Healing for Sustainable Resistance, Imagine Resistance: Movements for a Better World, and Envisioning Feminist Futures.

== Library ==
The library has over 4,000 volumes and films available to students, staff, and faculty, and subscribes to a variety of scholarly journals, news journals, and magazines.

== Emergency resources ==
The SDC provides confidential crisis support and information for any Brown student dealing with sexual assault. Sexual Assault Response and Prevention Program is the main resource for helping students affected by sexual violence. Confidential services include support for a survivor or the friends of a survivor, help filing a complaint (if that is the student's choice) and educational programs for the student community. As part of the Advocates Program, SDWC staff members are trained to help any Brown student explore his/her options to address an incident of sexual assault or sexual harassment. Talking with an Advocate does not require a student to file a disciplinary complaint or pursue any specific course of action.
