= Ebenezer Knight Dexter =

American merchant, U.S. marshal and philanthropist (1773–1824)

- Dexter c. 1810
- Born: April 26, 1773; Providence, Rhode Island
- Died: August 10, 1824 (aged 51); Providence, Rhode Island
- Resting place: North Burial Ground, Providence
- Occupations: Merchant, real estate developer, U.S. marshal
- Known for: Dexter Donation
- Spouse: Waitstill Howell (m. 1801; died 1819)
- Relatives: Gregory Dexter (3rd great-grandfather)

Ebenezer Knight Dexter (April 26, 1773 – August 10, 1824) was an American merchant, real estate developer, and United States Marshal for Rhode Island who became one of the most significant benefactors of Providence. His bequest to the town, known as the Dexter Donation, funded the Dexter Asylum for the poor and created the Dexter Training Ground, and it is still administered by the city.

== Early life, family, and career ==
Dexter was born in Providence, the seventh child of Knight Dexter and the sixth by his second wife, Phebe (Harris) Dexter, daughter of Joseph Harris. His father, a colonel of the Providence County militia, kept a popular and profitable public house on North Main Street north of Constitution Hill. Dexter was a sixth-generation descendant of Gregory Dexter (1610–1700), the London printer who published Roger Williams's A Key into the Language of America.

Dexter attended local schools and later went into business for himself as a merchant and real estate developer. An 1806 advertisement offered "a few pipes of real Holland Gin" (Note: A pipe was a large cask holding roughly 120 gallons.) and groceries at retail from his store, and he later served on bank boards. The historian William R. Staples wrote that Dexter was able to "retire with a fortune when most men begin to think of accumulating one."

Dexter was appointed U.S. marshal for Rhode Island in 1810 and held the post for more than fourteen years, until his death. As marshal he oversaw the 1810 and 1820 censuses in Rhode Island. He enforced federal bans on trade with Britain and France and presided over the sale of ships seized in Providence harbor. During the War of 1812 he compiled a census of British subjects living in Rhode Island and administered the Alien Enemies Act in the state.

== Residences ==
Dexter's house at 187 Benefit Street

Two of Dexter's homes survive. About 1800 a country house was built for him on his farm on Providence Neck, as the East Side was then known. He had sold the house by 1811 but kept most of the land, which he called his "Neck Farm" and later left to the town as the site of the Dexter Asylum. The house, which later owners named "Bellevue" and then "Rose Farm," still stands at 300 Angell Street.

His town residence, at 187 Benefit Street, was built about 1817–1820. It has been owned by the Rhode Island School of Design since 1964.

== Marriage, death and burial ==
On January 1, 1801, Dexter married Waitstill Howell (1776–1819), (Note: The Chad Browne Memorial gives Waitstill Dexter's death date as May 15, 1819. The inscription on the Dexter monument in the North Burial Ground gives June 15, 1819.) the eldest daughter of David Howell and Mary (Brown) Howell. Their only child, Mary, lived only a few months. Waitstill's death in 1819 left Dexter without direct heirs.

Dexter died on August 10, 1824, after a long illness. His funeral procession set out the next day from his house on Benefit Street, and he was buried in the North Burial Ground.

In 1867 the Providence City Council appropriated $3,000 for a cemetery monument. A committee bought a lot 40 feet square in the North Burial Ground and erected a 25-foot granite monument to Dexter and his ancestors, inscribed with their names. The remains of Dexter, his wife and his daughter were moved to the new lot, along with those of his father's family and his grandparents, which were brought from the West Burying Ground.

== Dexter Donation ==
Dexter Asylum in 1871

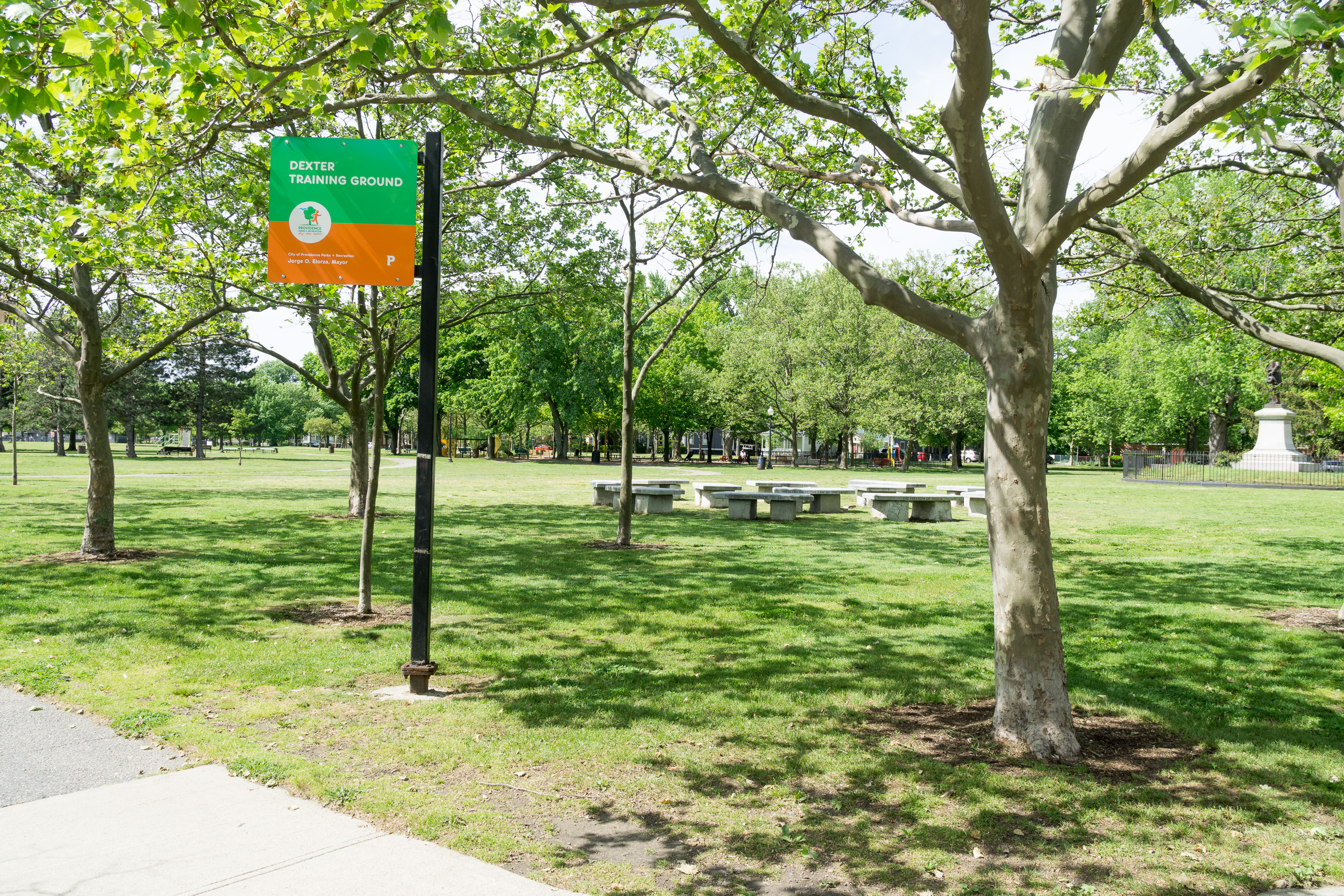
Dexter Training Ground

Dexter signed his will about two and a half months before his death. In it he said he was moved by "a strong attachment to my native town and an ardent desire to ameliorate the condition of the poor and contribute to their comfort and relief." The will gave the town:

- a large tract in the West End for use as a militia training field;
- his forty-acre "Neck Farm" on the East Side, for the use of the poor;
- the rest of his estate, real and personal, as a permanent fund for the poor.

On November 22, 1824, the Providence town meeting accepted the bequest. It directed that the property be known forever as the "Dexter Donation" and be kept separate from the town's other funds. In all, the town received more than 52 acres of land. The bequest was valued at about $60,000 when it was made. The Commissioners of the Dexter Donation, chaired by the Mayor of Providence, still manage the land and funds.

The Neck Farm became the site of the Dexter Asylum, a poorhouse designed by John Holden Greene, which took its first residents in 1828 and was completed in 1830. In 1957 a court allowed the city to sell the property despite the will's terms. Brown University bought it for $1,000,777, and the proceeds went into a trust fund for poor relief. The asylum was demolished in 1958 and the site became Brown's athletic complex.

The West End parcel became the Dexter Training Ground, where the Cranston Street Armory was built in 1907–1908.

== Statue ==
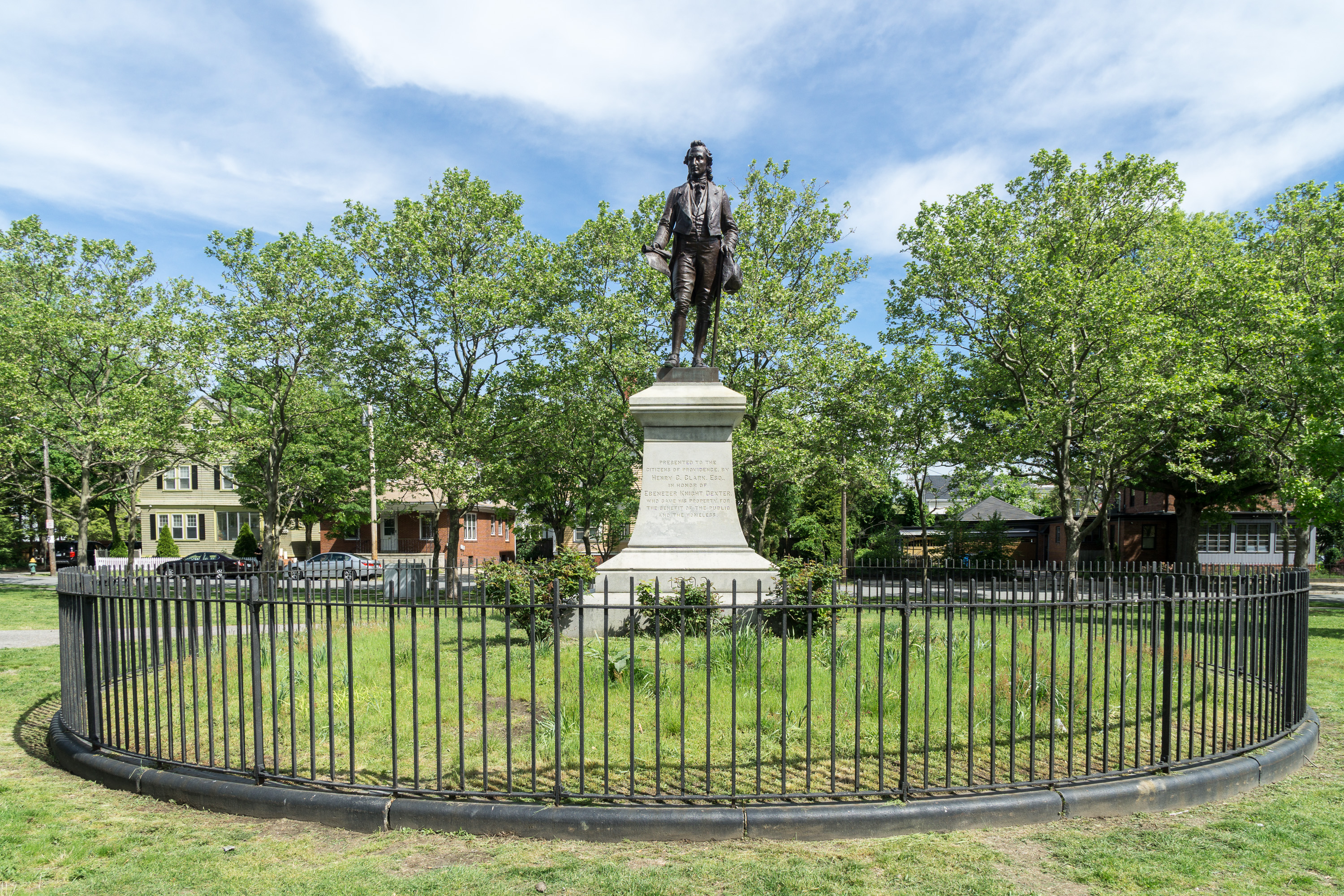
Statue of Dexter on the Training Ground

On June 13, 1893, Providence businessman Henry C. Clark offered the city a bronze statue of Dexter, asking in return that the city provide a pedestal. The city solicitor advised that a statue would not breach the will's restrictions on the field's use, and the City Council accepted the gift. The statue was cast by the Gorham Manufacturing Company and modeled by sculptor Hippolyte L. Hubert. The eight-foot bronze shows Dexter in Revolutionary-era dress, holding a walking stick and a partly opened scroll. It stands on a nine-foot granite pedestal.

The statue was dedicated on June 29, 1894. Former Chief Justice Thomas Durfee gave the dedication speech and some six hundred schoolchildren sang at the ceremony.

== Bibliography ==
- Bulkley, Abby Isabel Brown; Beckwith, Henry Truman (1888). The Chad Browne Memorial: Consisting of Genealogical Memoirs of a Portion of the Descendants of Chad and Elizabeth Browne. Brooklyn: Brooklyn Daily Eagle Book Printing Department.
- Coleman, Peter J.; Majeske, Penelope K. (August 1975). "British Immigrants in Rhode Island during the War of 1812" (PDF). Rhode Island History. 34 (3). Rhode Island Historical Society: 66–76.
- Conley, Patrick T. (2023). The Makers of Modern Rhode Island (Revised ed.). Charleston, SC: The History Press. ISBN 978-1-4671-5402-4.
- Cutter, William Richard, ed. (1914). New England Families, Genealogical and Memorial. Vol. 4. New York: Lewis Historical Publishing Company.
- Jordy, William H.; et al. (2004). "Ebenezer Knight Dexter–John J. Stimson House (Rose Farm)". Buildings of Rhode Island. Buildings of the United States. New York: Oxford University Press.
- Knights, Edwin M. (n.d.). "Dexter Donation: Ebenezer Knight Dexter's Enduring Gift to Providence". City of Providence.
- Merchants National Bank of Providence (1918). Old Providence: A Collection of Facts and Traditions Relating to Various Buildings and Sites of Historic Interest in Providence. Providence: Merchants National Bank of Providence.
- The National Cyclopaedia of American Biography. Vol. 8. New York: James T. White & Company. 1898.
- Newman, Sylvanus Chace (1859). Dexter Genealogy: Being a Record of the Families Descending from Rev. Gregory Dexter. Providence: A. C. Greene.
- Providence City Council (1894). Report of the Exercises at the Dedication of the Statue of Ebenezer Knight Dexter, Presented to the City of Providence by Henry C. Clark, Esq., June 29, 1894. Providence: Snow & Farnham, City Printers.
- Providence City Council (1904). Field, Edward; Carpenter, George Moulton; Rogers, Horatio (eds.). The Early Records of the Town of Providence. Vol. 18. Providence: Snow & Farnham.
- "Dexter House". DigitalCommons@RISD. Rhode Island School of Design.
- Sanderson, Edward F.; Woodward, Wm McKenzie; Kennedy, Pamela A. (October 1989). Historic and Architectural Resources of Providence, RI, 1636–present (PDF) (National Register of Historic Places Multiple Property Documentation Form). Rhode Island Historical Preservation Commission.
