= Patrick Conley =

American lawyer, real estate investor, and former history professor

Patrick T. Conley (born 1938) is an American lawyer, real estate investor, and former history professor. Conley served as Rhode Island's first historian laureate, a volunteer position appointed by the secretary of state, from 2012 to 2025. Conley was president of the Rhode Island Heritage Hall of Fame and later stood by the organization's decision in 2023 to induct former national security advisor Michael Flynn. He is known for his involvement in the tax sale market in Providence, Rhode Island; he stated in 2022 that he had obtained 140 properties through tax sales in the previous 14 years.

== Academic career, real estate activities, and political involvement ==
Conley was a professor at Providence College. He served as chief of staff for Republican mayoral candidate Buddy Cianci. In the 1980s, Conley successfully sued the Providence Journal for libel.

The New York Times in 2007 reported on Conley's efforts to convert Providence's industrial waterfront into a "$300 million mixed-use development" with "a hotel, marina, 240 condominiums or rental apartments, a parking garage for 890 cars, a floating restaurant, retail and office space, and green space for festivals, concerts and other outdoor events", which were opposed by some business owners. Conley is involved in tax sales in Providence. In 2022, he was among the advocates of a law that would have reduced out-of-state participation in the state's municipal tax sales. According to the Providence Journal, Conley estimated that he had obtained 140 such properties in the past 14 years.

In 2024, Providence Journal reported that Conley had donated his 10-room waterfront home in Bristol to his non-profit organization, Heritage Harbor Foundation, in 2020. The organization later donated it back to him after its fundraising drive failed. After the Providence Journal's article was published, he told the newspaper that he had unknowingly likely violated an Internal Revenue Service rule against "self-dealing"; the terms of Conley's donation to his foundation would have allowed him and his wife to continue living in the property while the foundation paid the mortgage.

== Civic participation ==
Conley served as the state's first historian laureate from 2012 to 2025; the historian laureate is a volunteer role appointed by the secretary of state to speak on the state's history at certain events, inform state officials on historical information, and edit publications sponsored by the state. Nellie Gorbea reappointed Conley in 2020 with no public announcement. Conley asked not to be reappointed in 2025; Gregg Amore announced his successor, Keith Stokes, later that year after a public selection process.

In 2014, Conley and state governor Lincoln Chafee took part in its unveiling of a new statue of Thomas Wilson Dorr, leader of the Dorr Rebellion, at the Rhode Island State House. In 2019, History Press published Conley's book The Leaders of Rhode Island's Golden Age, which contains the biographies of 120 Rhode Islanders of the late 19th century. Previous books include Rhode Island Founders (2010) and The Makers of Modern Rhode Island (2012).

=== Rhode Island Heritage Hall of Fame ===
Conley was president of the Rhode Island Heritage Hall of Fame as of 2018 and then its "volunteer general counsel" as of 2023. He is a 1995 inductee. During his tenure as president, inductees included Superior Court judge Francis Darigan Jr. in 2018. Darrigan attended Providence College when Conley was a professor at the school; campaigned against Republican mayoral candidate Buddy Cianci, to whom Conley served as chief of staff; and was the presiding judge in Conley's successful libel case against the Providence Journal in the 1980s.

In 2023, the organization announced its intent to induct Michael Flynn, the US national security advisor under Donald Trump's first presidency who had plead guilty in 2017 to lying to the FBI about conversations with the Russian ambassador and later promoted claims that the 2020 presidential election was stolen from Trump. After eight board members resigned from the organization, and the state's congressional delegates and statewide elected executive officials stated that they would not attend Flynn's induction, Conley defended the organization's decision but said the organization would delay the induction because of the "poor timing to honor General Flynn in this turbulent and politically charged environment."
