= Rhode Island Heritage Hall of Fame =

The Rhode Island Heritage Hall of Fame was established in the state of Rhode Island in 1965.

== Mission ==
The Rhode Island Heritage Hall of Fame

exists to honor and recognize, and to extol and publicize the achievements of those Rhode Island men and women who have, in the words of the Hall of Fame induction citation, 'made significant contributions to their community, state, and/or nation.' It is also our mission to tell the story of Rhode Island History via interactive technology using the biographies of our inductees, noting their collective impact upon every phase of Rhode Island's development. Eligible membership may include those who are native born, those whose reputations have been made while residents of the state, and those who have adopted Rhode Island as their permanent home.

== Officers ==
The Rhode Island Heritage Hall of Fame is managed by a president, vice president, recording secretary, corresponding secretary, and treasurer, with an active board of about twenty members, who serve as the electors to the Rhode Island Heritage Hall of Fame. They receive formal, written nominations from the general public.

== Inductees ==
Nearly 800 men and women have been inducted into the hall of fame, including Native Americans from the earliest days of the English Colony of Rhode Island and Providence Plantations.

In 2023, the organization announced its intent to induct Michael Flynn, the retired U.S. army lieutenant general and U.S. national security advisor under Donald Trump's first presidency. Flynn plead guilty in 2017 to lying to the Federal Bureau of Investigation about conversations with the Russian ambassador and later promoted claims that the 2020 presidential election was stolen from Trump. Eight board members resigned from the organization and the state's congressional delegates and statewide elected executive officials stated that they would not attend Flynn's induction in the 2024 class. Patrick Conley, the organization's "volunteer general counsel", stood by the organization's decision but said it would delay the induction because it was "poor timing to honor General Flynn in this turbulent and politically charged environment."

== Publications ==
- Patrick T. Conley and Manuel Gorriaran, Eminent Rhode Islanders: Biographical Profiles of the Inductees to the Rhode Island Heritage Hall of Fame, 1965-2000 (Providence: [The Rhode Island Heritage Hall of Fame in conjunction with the Rhode Island Publications Society, 2001]).
- Patrick T. Conley, Rhode Island's Founders: From Settlement to Statehood. (Charleston, SC: The History Press, 2010) ISBN 978-1-59629-739-5
- Patrick T. Conley, The Makers of Modern Rhode Island [1790-1860]. (Charleston, SC: The History Press, 2012) ISBN 978-1-60949-164-2
- Patrick T. Conley, The Leaders of Rhode Island's Golden Age [1861-1900]. (The History Press, 2019) ISBN 978-1-4671-4148-2

== See also ==
- Rhode Island Heritage Hall of Fame Women Inductees
