= Dexter Asylum =

Coordinates: 41.8308401°N 71.3974812°W

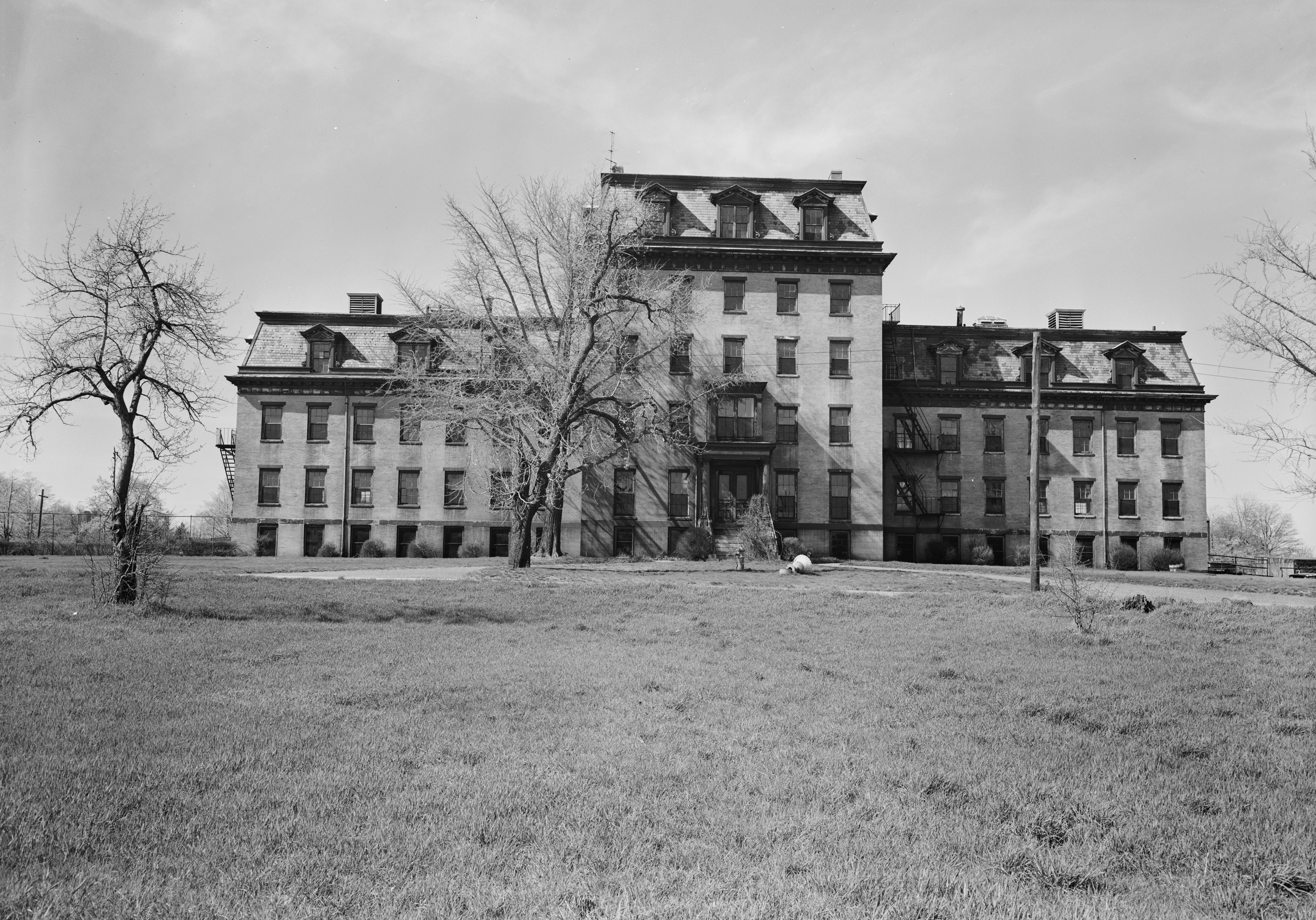
- Library of Congress photo, taken April 1958 just before demolition

General information
- Status: Demolished
- Type: Poorhouse and farm surrounded by a wall
- Architectural style: Victorian
- Location: Bounded by Hope Street, Stimson Avenue, Angell Street, Arlington Avenue and Lloyd Avenue, Providence, Rhode Island
- Named for: Ebenezer Knight Dexter
- Construction started: 1824
- Completed: 1828
- Opened: 1828
- Closed: 1956
- Demolished: 1957
- Owner: City of Providence, Rhode Island

Technical details
- Grounds: 39 acres

Design and construction
- Known for: Poor farm

Dexter Asylum was a "poor farm" on the East Side of Providence, Rhode Island. It was built in 1828 and housed poor, elderly, and mentally ill residents who could not otherwise take care of themselves. In 1957 it was sold via auction to Brown University and demolished for a complex of athletic fields and buildings.

== Benefactor ==
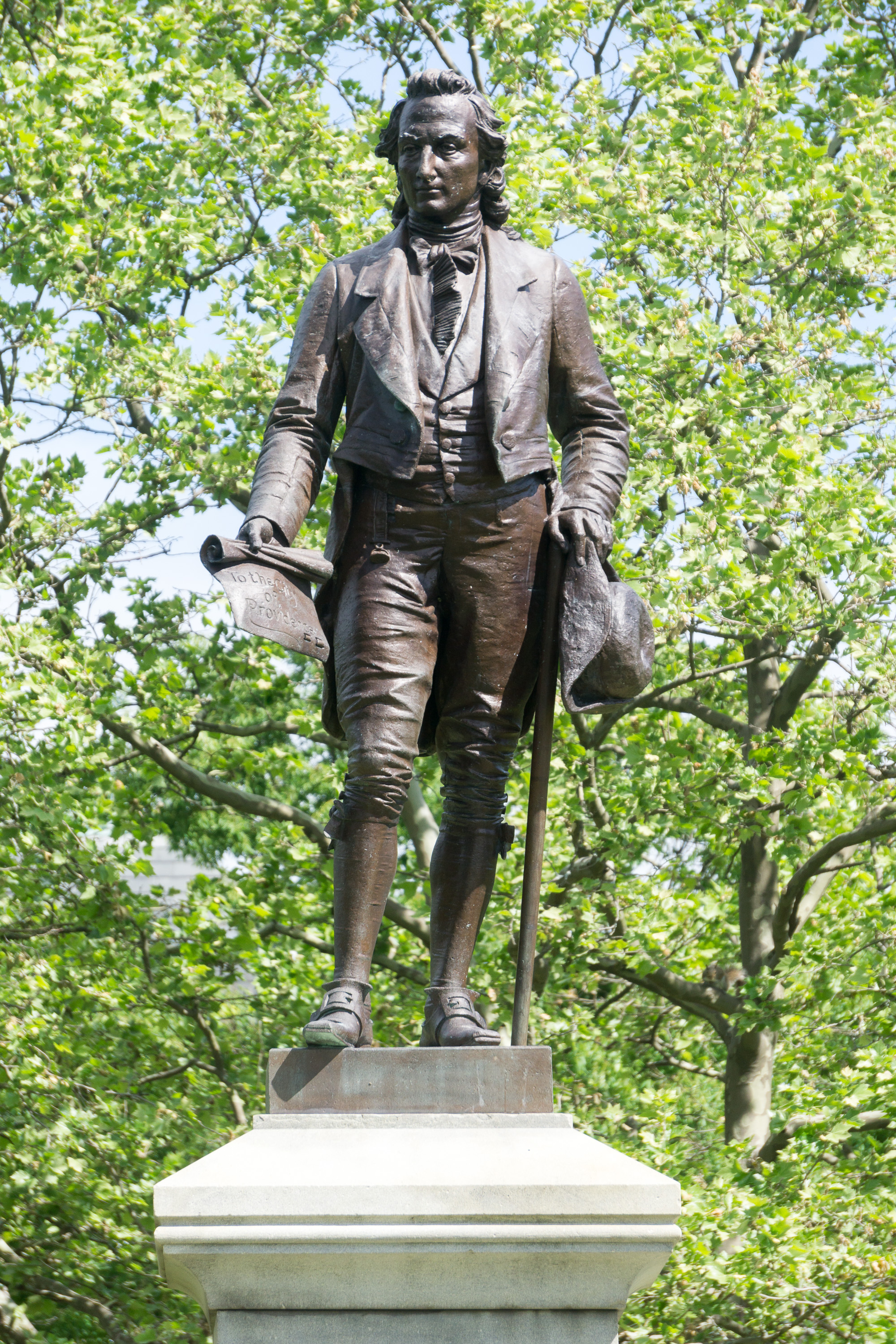
A statue of Ebenezer Knight Dexter at the Dexter Training Ground, near the Cranston Street Armory

Providence had no institution to care for the poor prior to the Dexter Asylum. People unable to support themselves were taken care of in private homes by caretakers who would bid for the job.

Ebenezer Knight Dexter was a wealthy mercantile trader in Providence. Upon his death in 1824, he bequeathed to the town his 40-acre Neck Farm on the East Side of Providence. Dexter stipulated in his will that a poor farm or almshouse must be built on the site within five years. In 1828, the Dexter Asylum was completed and opened, named for its benefactor.

== Building and grounds ==
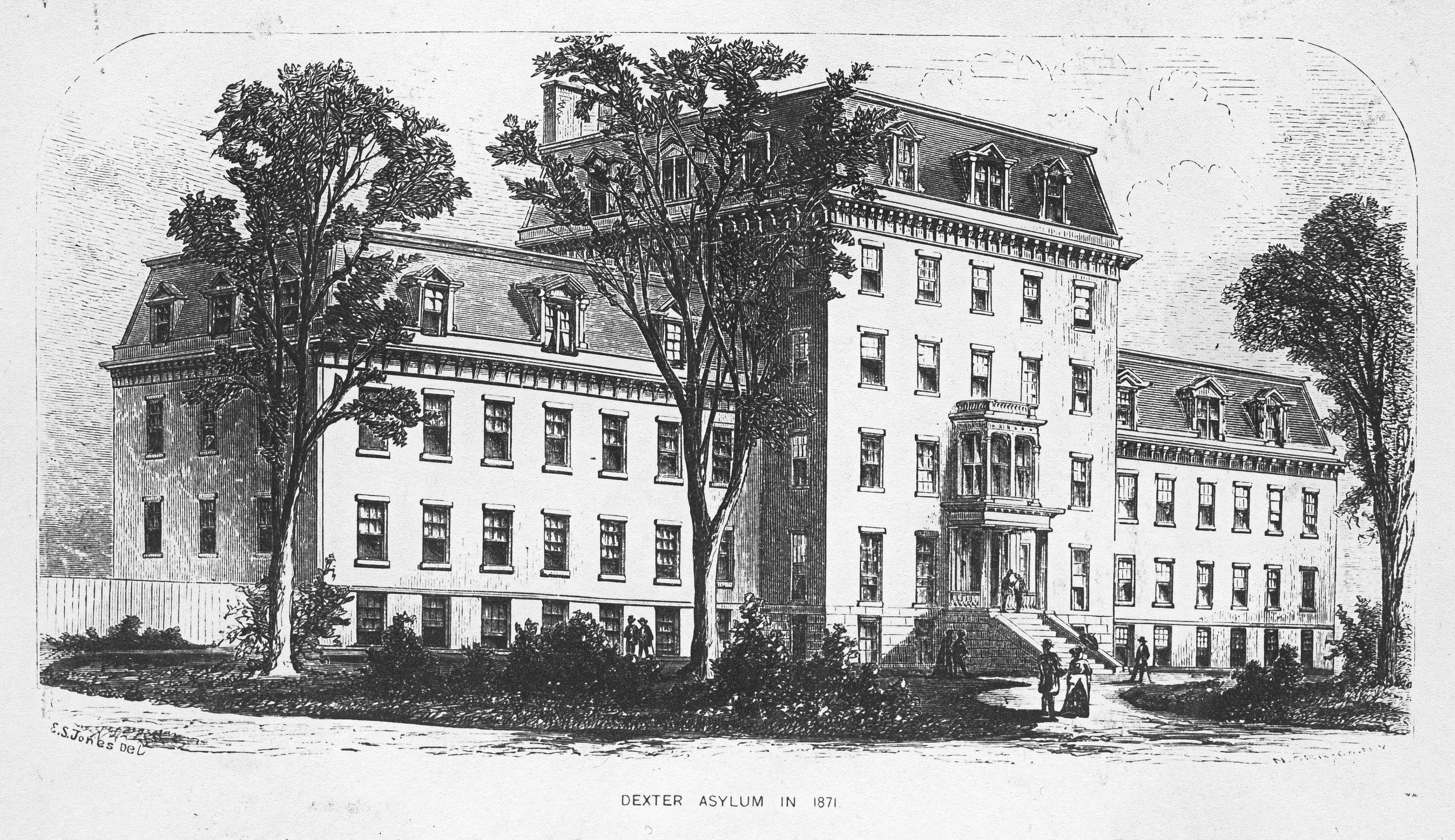
1871 engraving

=== Building ===
The building itself was originally three stories high, and later expanded with a mansard roof and dormers.

=== Dexter Wall ===
The property was known as much for its unusual stone boundary wall as for the building itself. The specifications of the wall were detailed in Dexter's will, which required that the city build "a good, permanent stone wall of at least 3 feet thick at the bottom and at least 8 feet high and to be placed on a foundation of small stones as thick as the bottom wall and sunk 2 feet into the ground." It took eight years and $12,700 to complete the wall, which was over a mile long. It is unclear whether the purpose of the wall was to protect the privacy of asylum residents, or to protect the neighbors from seeing the downtrodden residents within.

Over time, the wall grew into local legend. Boastful locals would claim to have picnicked on the wall or to have walked or even bicycled the entire perimeter. Wealthy neighbors sometimes viewed the wall as an eyesore; portions still stand today surrounding Brown's Olney-Margolies Athletic Complex.

== Life at Dexter Asylum ==
At the time of its building, poor farms were considered a humane, progressive way to deal with poverty. The idea was for poor, elderly, and ill people to earn their keep by working in a vegetable and dairy farm, instead of begging on the streets. Proceeds from the farms helped the asylum to be financially self-sufficient and even to turn a profit, at least for a time. The dairy farm included cows and pigs.

Residents at Dexter Asylum were typically unemployed immigrants, mostly from Ireland. They were indentured for a period of six months and subject to strict rules of daily conduct. Residents included both men and women, but they were strictly separated. Visitors were admitted only once every three weeks. Despite living on a working farm, residents were served only white bread and tea for dinner.

By 1849, the institution faced overcrowding, with 190 residents living at the asylum at its height. That number was trimmed to around 100, where it remained for most of the rest of its existence.

== Closing and destruction ==
By the early 20th century, the asylum had begun to decline. A poorhouse was seen as undesirable as the neighborhood grew in affluence. Also, society's ideas were changing on how to help the poor; poor farms were becoming an anachronism as states started establishing welfare programs. The resident population at Dexter also declined. The city started to look for ways to close the institution; however, Dexter's will had specified that the town could never sell the property and that it could only be used for his specified purpose.

The city spent years in court working to overturn this requirement and brought its first case as early as 1926, in an effort to turn the property into housing. This case was lost, but the state Supreme Court eventually cleared the way for a public auction. In 1956, the plot was auctioned off, and Brown University won with a bid of $1,000,777, or $25,653 per acre.

Eight people were still living in the facility at the time of the sale. They were moved, the existing buildings were demolished, and Brown eventually built Meehan Auditorium and the Olney-Margolies Athletic Complex on the site. The city set aside the money from the sale to create the Dexter Donation, which gives annual grants to assist the city's poor.
