= Washington Street School =

Washington Street School may refer to

- Washington Street School (Hartford, Connecticut), listed on the National Register of Historic Places in Hartford, Connecticut
- Washington Street School (Franklin Square, New York)
