= Lincoln Street Historic District =

Lincoln Street Historic District may refer to:

- Allen Place–Lincoln Street Historic District, listed on the NRHP in Hartford, Connecticut
- Lincoln Street Historic District (Gary, Indiana)
- Lincoln Street Historic District (Brunswick, Maine), listed on the NRHP in Cumberland County, Maine
- Lincoln Street Historic District (Oregon, Wisconsin), listed on the NRHP in Oregon, Wisconsin

== See also ==
- Lincoln Street Electric Streetlights, Twin Falls, Idaho, listed on the NRHP in Twin Falls County, Idaho
