= Spencer House (Hartford, Connecticut) =

Historic house in Connecticut, United States

- U.S. National Register of Historic Places
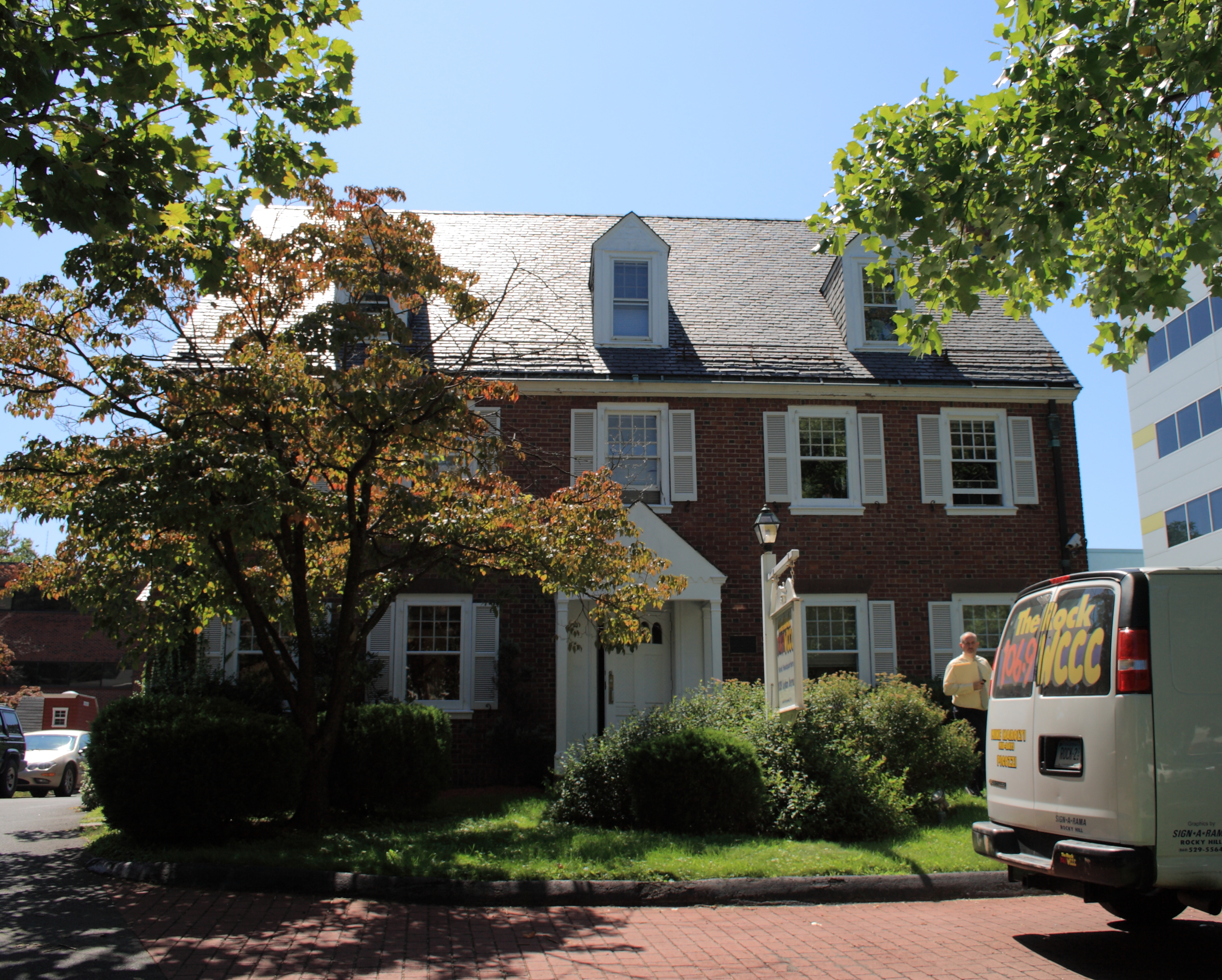

- Location within Connecticut Location within the United States
- Location: 1039 Asylum Avenue, Hartford, Connecticut
- Coordinates: 41°46′18″N 72°42′0″W
- Area: 0.3 acres (0.12 ha)
- Built: 1929
- Architect: Ebbets & Frid
- Architectural style: Colonial Revival
- MPS: Asylum Hill MRA
- NRHP reference No.: 83001265
- Added to NRHP: February 24, 1983

The Spencer House is a historic house at 1039 Asylum Avenue in Hartford, Connecticut. Built in 1929 for a bank chairman, it is one of the last grand houses to be built in the city's Asylum Hill area, and is a good example of Georgian Revival architecture. It was listed on the National Register of Historic Places in 1983.

== Description and history ==
The Spencer House is located West of Downtown Hartford in the city's Asylum Hill neighborhood, on the South Side of Asylum Avenue at its junction with Gillett Street. It is a 2 1/2-story masonry structure, built out of red brick with wooden trim. It is covered by a side gable roof pierced by three gabled dormers finished in wooden shingles. The main facade is five bays wide, with a recessed center entrance fronted by a gabled portico supported by round columns. An ell extends to the rear of the main block. The interior follows a center hall plan, with what was historically the main parlor on the left, and the library and dining room on the right, with service facilities in the ell.

The house was built in 1929 for Arthur Spencer Jr., chairman of the board of the Hartford National Bank and Trust Company. It was designed by Ebbets & Frid, and marked the end of Asylum Hill's period as the city's fashionable residential area. The neighborhood entered a decline with the advent of the Great Depression, and has lost many houses to subsequent commercial development. This house was adapted for use as a medical office in 1959, and as a radio station studio facility in the 1970s.

== See also ==
- National Register of Historic Places listings in Hartford, Connecticut
