= Collins and Townley Streets District =

Historic district in Connecticut, United States

- U.S. National Register of Historic Places
- U.S. Historic district
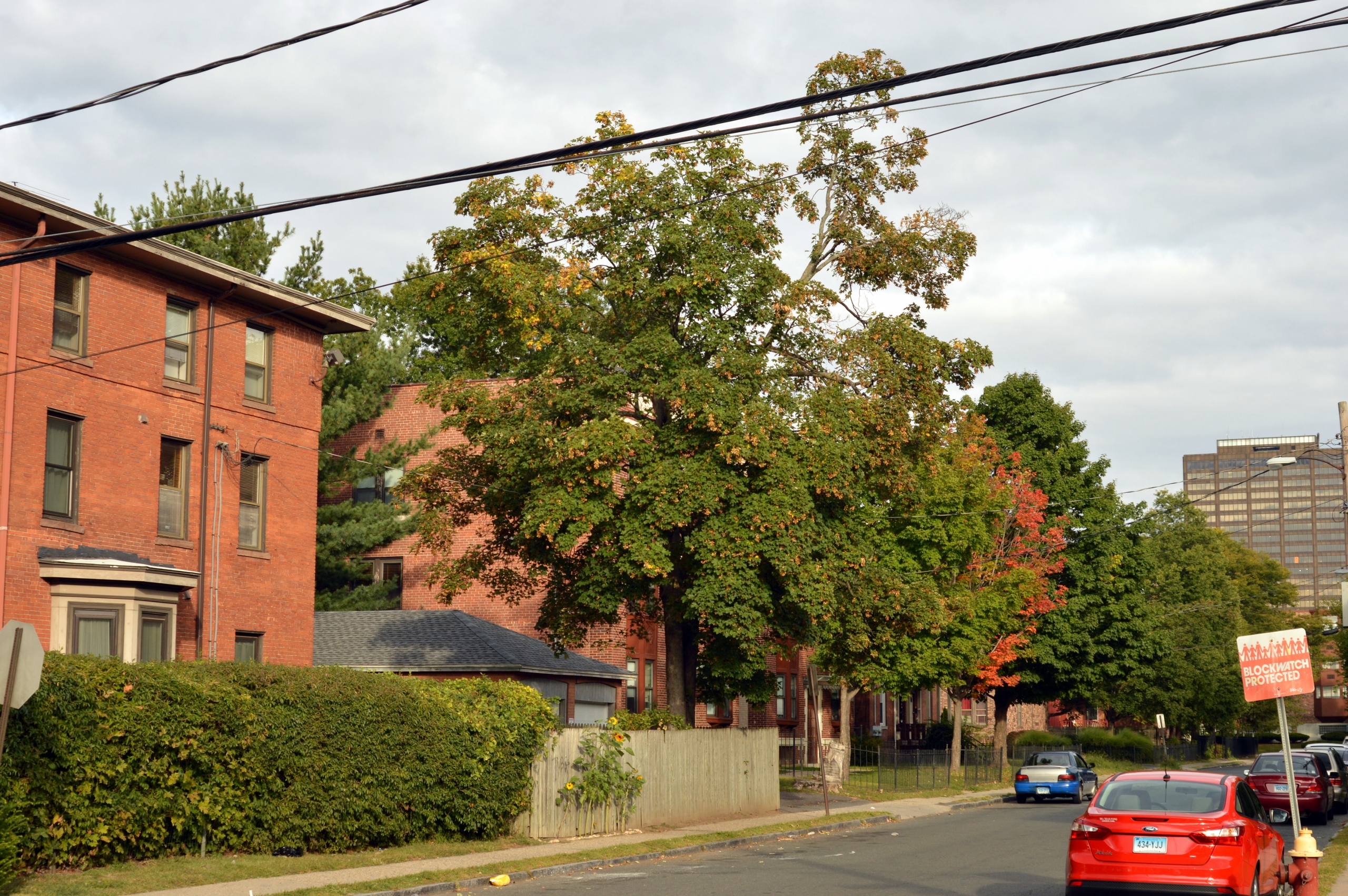

- Location within Connecticut Location within the United States
- Location: Collins and Townley Streets, Hartford, Connecticut
- Coordinates: 41°46′20″N 72°41′44″W
- Area: 22 acres (8.9 ha)
- Architect: Keller, George
- Architectural style: Queen Anne, Italianate, Shingle Style
- MPS: Asylum Hill MRA
- NRHP reference No.: 79002676
- Added to NRHP: November 29, 1979

The Collins and Townley Streets District is a historic district encompassing a cluster of mid-to-late 19th-century residences in the Asylum Hill neighborhood of Hartford, Connecticut. It includes properties on Collins, Atwood, Willard, and Townley Streets, which range architecturally from the Italianate and Second Empire of the 1860s and 1870s to the Shingle style of the 1890s. The district was listed on the National Register of Historic Places in 1979.

== Description and history ==
Hartford's Asylum Hill area was farmland until the mid-1850s, when it began to be developed as a residential area. Collins Street has what is believed to be its oldest house, at #287, which stood on the estate of the Collins family. Over the next few decades the area south of Collins Street was turned into a residential neighborhood much as it is today, with a diversity of architectural styles.

Townley Street has one of the more consistent streetscapes, with a collection of brick and brownstone Italianate and Second Empire one and two-family houses. The U formed by Collins, Atwood, and Willard Streets has a series of Shingle style houses, most of which have brick first floors and shingled upper levels and touches of Colonial Revival design. East of Willard, Collins is lined with a row of slightly older Queen Anne and Italianate houses. Two of the houses, 171 Collins Street and 970 Asylum Avenue, have a known architect: in both instances it is George Keller.

== See also ==
- National Register of Historic Places listings in Hartford, Connecticut
