= Sigourney Square District =

- U.S. National Register of Historic Places
- U.S. Historic district
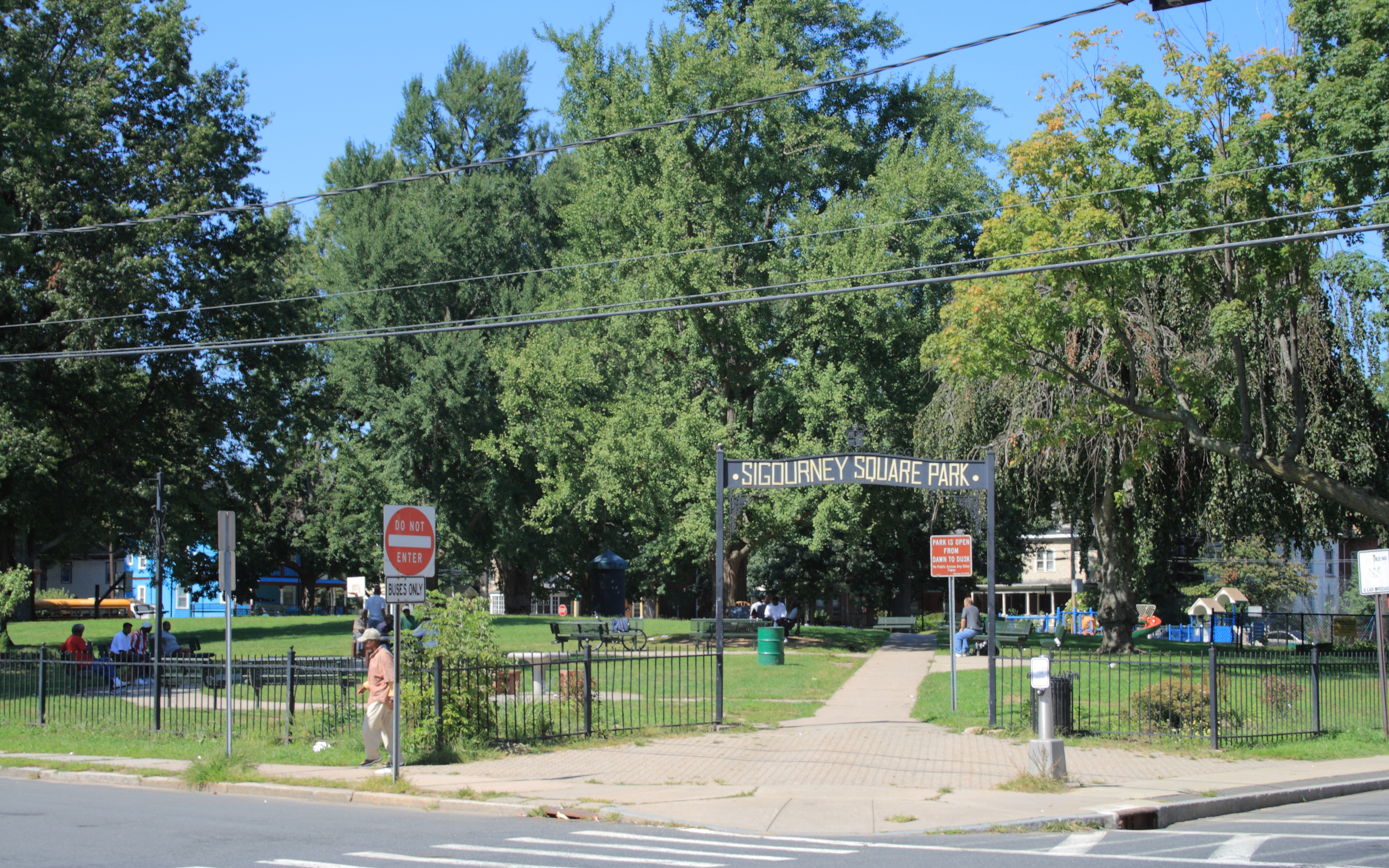
- Sigourney Square Park

- Location within Connecticut Location within the United States
- Location: Sargeant, Ashley and May Streets, Hartford, Connecticut
- Coordinates: 41°46′28″N 72°41′33″W
- Area: 45 acres (18 ha) (original size); 2 acres (0.81 ha) (size of first increase)
- Built: 1890
- Architect: Multiple
- Architectural style: Queen Anne
- NRHP reference No.: 79002660 (original); 83003568 (increase 1); 11000610 (increase 2)

Significant dates
- Added to NRHP: January 16, 1979
- Boundary increases: December 21, 1983; September 13, 2011

The Signourney Square Historic District encompasses a neighborhood in the Asylum Hill area of Hartford, Connecticut, United States, that was almost entirely built out in a single decade at the end of the 19th century as a middle-class residential area. It is roughly bounded by Garden, Ashley, and Woodland Streets on the East, South, and West, and by Railroad Tracks North of Sargeant Street to the north. The area retains much of its late 19th-century character, with relatively few modern intrusions. It was listed on the National Register of Historic Places in 1979, with small additions in 1983 and 2011.

== Description and history ==
In the mid-19th century, the area surrounding Hartford's Sigourney Square was occupied by the city's "town farm", which provided housing, work, and support for its indigent population. This area was hemmed in by road development in the second half of the 19th century, and the farm was reduced in size, and finally shut down in 1896. Only three buildings, modest brick Italianate structures on Ashley Street built about 1850, survive from the town farm period of land use. When the town farm was closed, a portion of it was set aside by the city for use as a public park, which is now known as Sigourney Square Park. Landscaping for the park was developed by J. Alex McClunie, a local landscape architect. Development of pieces of the farm began in 1891, when developer Frederick Mahl built ten Queen Anne houses on Ashley Street. Development was largely complete in the area by 1900.

The district covers about 45 acres (18 ha), and includes 169 primary buildings. The vast majority of them are wood-frame structures two stories in height, housing either one or two units. Exteriors are generally of wood, brick, or some combination of the two, with Queen Anne Victorian features. There are ten larger apartment blocks, typically housing at least six units, as well as a church and two small commercial buildings. The district has been enlarged twice: the first addition in 1983 added houses on the east side of Garden Street that have been subsequently demolished, and the 2011 addition added 207 Garden Street, a mixed commercial-residential brick block.

== See also ==
- National Register of Historic Places listings in Hartford, Connecticut
