= Wethersfield Avenue Car Barn =

- U.S. National Register of Historic Places
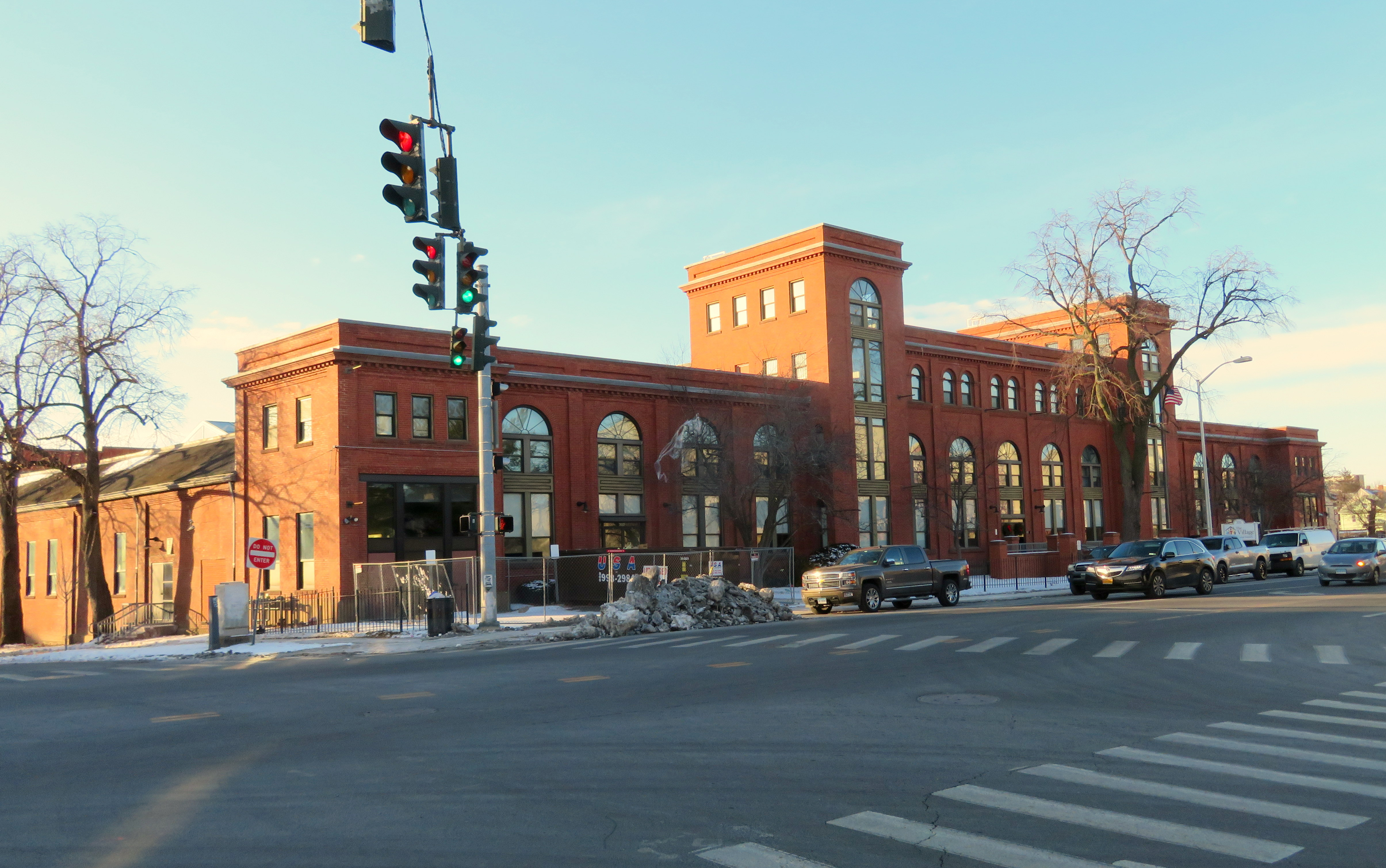
- Wethersfield Avenue Car Barn in 2017

- Location within Connecticut Location within the United States
- Location: 331 Wethersfield Avenue, Hartford, Connecticut
- Coordinates: 41°44′48″N 72°40′29″W
- Area: 1.4 acres (0.57 ha)
- Built: 1902
- Architect: Snell, Thomas C. B.
- Architectural style: Late 19th And 20th Century Revivals
- NRHP reference No.: 83003569
- Added to NRHP: November 28, 1983

The Wethersfield Avenue Car Barn, also known locally just as the Trolley Barn, is a historic trolley barn at 331 Wethersfield Avenue in Hartford, Connecticut, United States. Built in 1902, it is the only surviving building used exclusively for the area's extensive electrified street car network in the first half of the 20th century. Now converted to other uses, it was listed on National Register of Historic Places in 1983.

== Description and history ==
The Wethersfield Avenue Car Barn is located in Hartford's southern Barry Square neighborhood, occupying most of a city block's frontage on the west side of Wethersfield Avenue, between Elliot and Benton Streets. It is a multi-section brick structure, ranging in height from two to four stories. A tall central section is flanked by four-story towers, with two-story flanking wings that have projecting pavilions at the ends. The styling is a fairly typical early 20th-century commercial Italianate, with multi-story round-arch windows, brick corbelling, and terra cotta panels.

Trolley service began in Hartford in 1862, and this location is where the Hartford and Wethersfield Horse Railway, operators of the service, had its main facility. Originally horsecar service, the company began electrifying its routes in 1888, and changed its name to the Hartford Street Railway Company in 1893, reflecting a move away from horse-drawn services. This facility was built to replace the previous one, because of the reduced demand for horse care and increased demand for trolley maintenance and storage. As the company expanded, it also established maintenance facilities on Vernon and State Streets; only one of these survives in much-altered form as a bus facility. This facility survived until 1941, when trolley service was discontinued in favor of buses, and was sold. It was converted into a sporting arena, used primarily for boxing events. It has since been repurposed for other uses, including housing social service agencies.

== See also ==
- National Register of Historic Places listings in Hartford, Connecticut
