= M. Swift and Sons Company =

- U.S. National Register of Historic Places
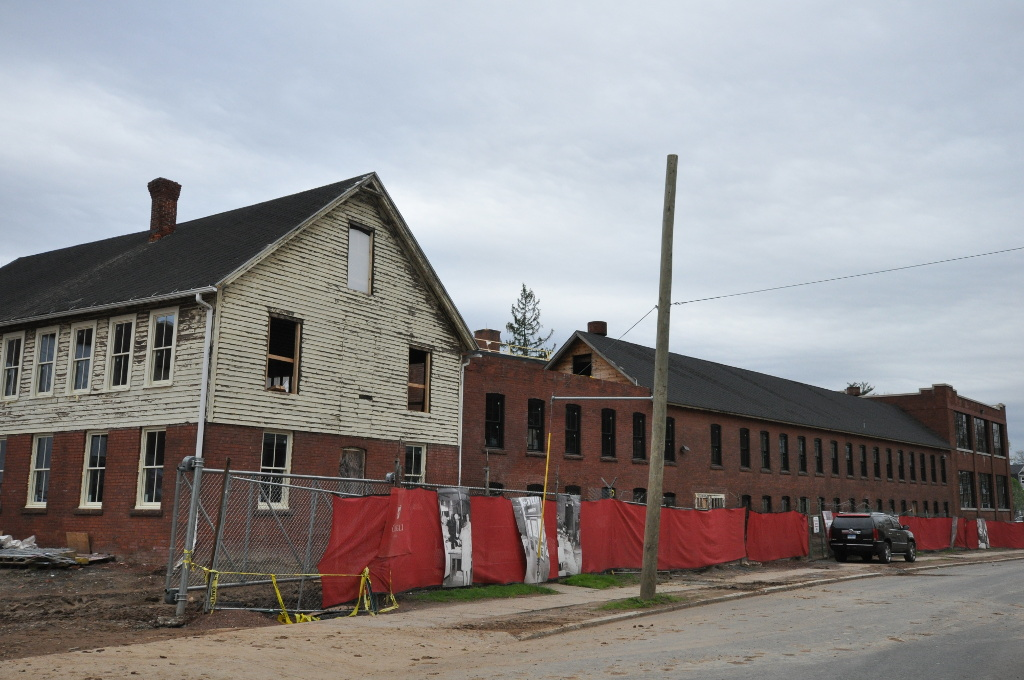

- Location within Connecticut Location within the United States
- Location: 10 & 60 Love Lane, Hartford, Connecticut
- Coordinates: 41°47′31″N 72°40′52″W
- Area: 2.6 acres (1.1 ha)
- Built: c. 1887
- NRHP reference No.: 13000527
- Added to NRHP: July 24, 2013

The M. Swift and Sons Company is a historic industrial complex at 10 and 60 Love Lane in Hartford, Connecticut. Established around 1887, it was the home of one of the nation's most successful manufacturers of gold leaf by the process of goldbeating. The complex, including both industrial and residential components, was listed on the National Register of Historic Places in 2013.

== Description and history ==
The former M. Swift and Sons Company plant is located in Hartford's residential North End neighborhood, on a roughly triangular parcel bounded by Love Lane on the west, Garden Street on the east, and Westland Street to the south. The largest structure is the main factory building, a two-story agglomeration of brick and stone structures that are the result of multiple building expansions by the Swift Company. The property also includes two houses, built c. 1887 and 1914, that are historically associated with the factory's owners.

The company was founded in 1887, when Matthew Swift left Hartford's largest goldbeating company, the J.M. Ney Company, to begin his own business on this parcel, which he had purchased for his residence in 1871. Originally working out of a small wood-frame building south of his house, Swift's company grew rapidly, with repeated expansions of infrastructure by the early 19th century. In 1902, the Swift Company was the largest goldbeating company in the state. In the first half of the 20th century it continued to grow, shipping gold leaf to international markets, and innovating in the processes of its manufacture. The company's business eventually succumbed to changing tastes, and it was shuttered in 2005.

== See also ==
- National Register of Historic Places listings in Hartford, Connecticut
