= Jefferson-Seymour District =

Historic district in Connecticut, United States

- U.S. National Register of Historic Places
- U.S. Historic district
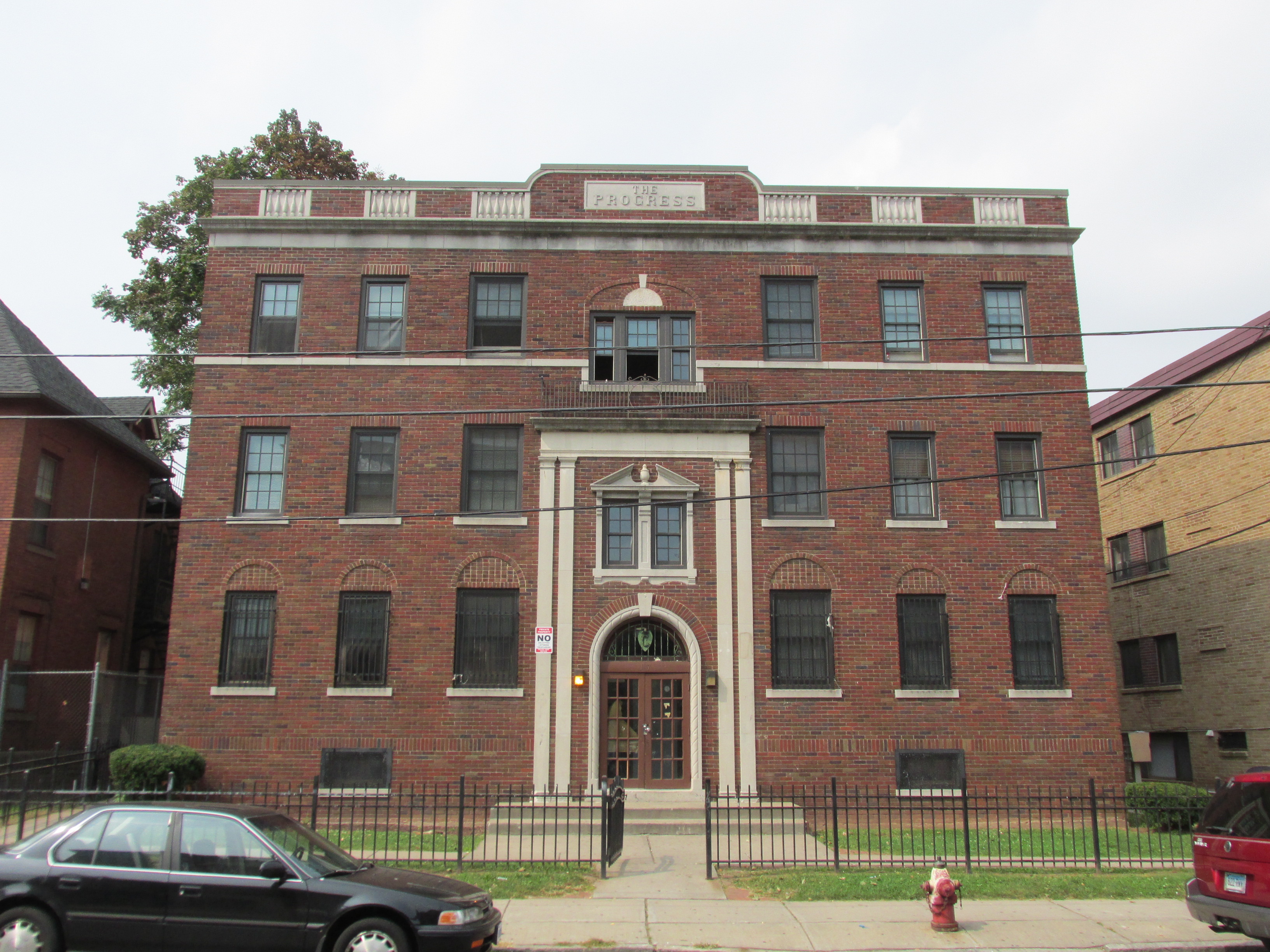

- Location within Connecticut Location within the United States
- Location: Cedar, Wadsworth, Seymour and Jefferson Streets, Hartford, Connecticut
- Coordinates: 41°45′27″N 72°40′50″W
- Area: 23 acres (9.3 ha)
- Built: 1875
- Architect: Loomis, Charles; Multiple
- Architectural style: Greek Revival, Italianate, Queen Anne
- NRHP reference No.: 79002661
- Added to NRHP: May 4, 1979

The Jefferson-Seymour District is a historic district encompassing a residential area on the South Side of Hartford, Connecticut. Covering portions of Cedar, Wadsworth, Seymour and Jefferson Streets, it contains a well-preserved collection of late 19th and early 20th-century middle-class residential architecture, primarily executed in brick. It was listed on the National Register of Historic Places in 1979.

== Description and history ==
The area South of Downtown Hartford between Washington and Main Streets was developed as a residential area beginning in the mid-19th century. It was bounded by estates on Washington Street that extended east to Cedar Street, and the south by the institutional campuses of the Hartford Hospital and Hartford Orphan Asylum, both established in the 1860s. This area became an enclave of middle-class residential housing, with densely built one and two-family houses, housing people who worked either in downtown, at one of the two institutions, or a short way east at the Colt Armory. In the early 20th century, some of the area was redeveloped to include a number of apartment blocks. The area is now hemmed in by encroaching state and municipal offices to the north and west, and the growing medical institutions to the south.

The historic district is bounded on the south by Jefferson Street, and extends north along Seymour Street to Park Street. Including two short blocks of Park Street, it then extends further north along back-to-back sides of Cedar and Wadsworth Streets nearly to Buckingham Street. Most of the residences in this area are built out of brick, and are two stories in height. Early construction exhibits a combination of Italianate and Greek Revival elements, with later buildings in modestly decorated versions of the Second Empire and Queen Anne. The later apartment blocks are typically in the Colonial Revival style, which is also reflected in a few single-family houses built in the 1920s.

== See also ==
- National Register of Historic Places listings in Hartford, Connecticut
