= Chevry Lomday Mishnayes Synagogue =

- U.S. National Register of Historic Places
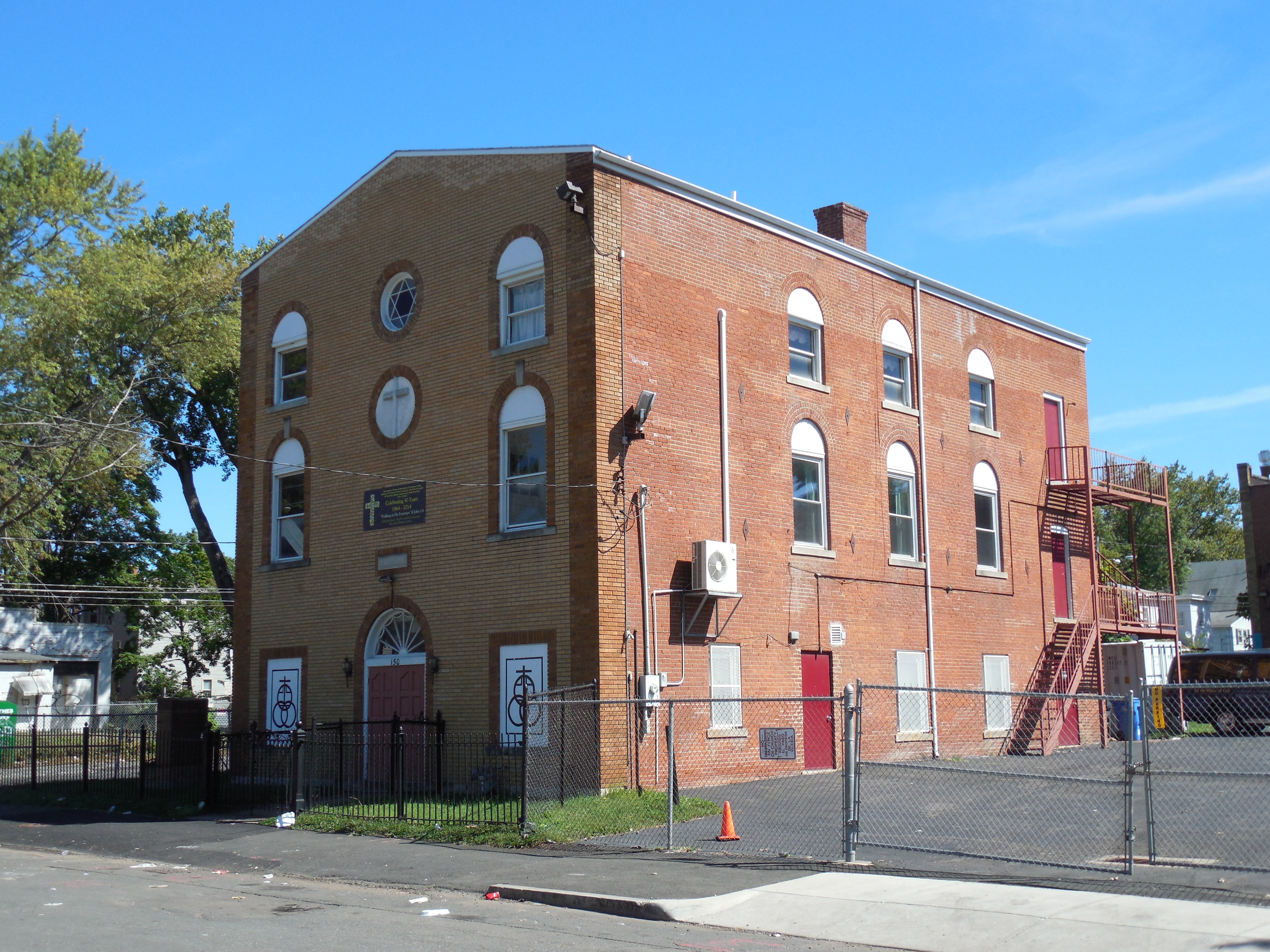

- Location within Connecticut Location within the United States
- Location: 148-150 Bedford Street, Hartford, Connecticut
- Coordinates: 41°46′46″N 72°41′1″W
- Area: less than one acre
- Built: 1924
- Architectural style: Classical Revival
- MPS: Historic Synagogues of Connecticut MPS
- NRHP reference No.: 95000575
- Added to NRHP: May 11, 1995

Chevry Lomday Mishnayes Synagogue (Note: Also Chevre Lomdai Mishnayes Synagogue.) is a historic former synagogue building at 148-150 Bedford Street in Hartford, Connecticut, in the United States. Built in 1924, it is unusual for an ecclesiastical structure in that its design appears to be based on that of an apartment house. It housed an Orthodox Jewish congregation until 1963, and now houses the local House of God Church. It was listed on the National Register of Historic Places in 1995.

== Description and history ==
The former Chevry Lomday Mishnayes Synagogue stands in Hartford's Clay-Arsenal neighborhood north of the downtown, at the southeast corner of Mather and Bedford Streets. It is a masonry structure, built out of red brick with trim of orange and yellow brick. It is three stories in height, with a shallow-pitch gabled roof. Upper story windows are set in round-arch openings, framed by soldier bricks; the windows on the front facade second story have keystones. On the front facade there are round windows at the center of the second and third floors; the second floor window has been filled with a panel housing a cross, while the third floor window shows a Star of David.

Chevry Lomday Mishnayes ("Society for Study of Mishnah"), an Orthodox Jewish congregation, was organized in 1918, and met in a variety of quarters before this synagogue was built in 1924. It has as its shell a basic three-story apartment house design, with its principal modification the shapes of the second and third-floor windows. The congregation remained here until 1963, when it moved to a private residence. It has since been occupied by Christian groups, most recently the House of God.

The building was one of fifteen Connecticut synagogues added to the National Register of Historic Places in 1995 and 1996 in response to an unprecedented multiple submission, nominating nineteen synagogues.

== See also ==
- National Register of Historic Places listings in Hartford, Connecticut
