= Dr. Frank T. Simpson House =

Historic house in Connecticut, United States

- U.S. National Register of Historic Places
- U.S. Historic district – Contributing property
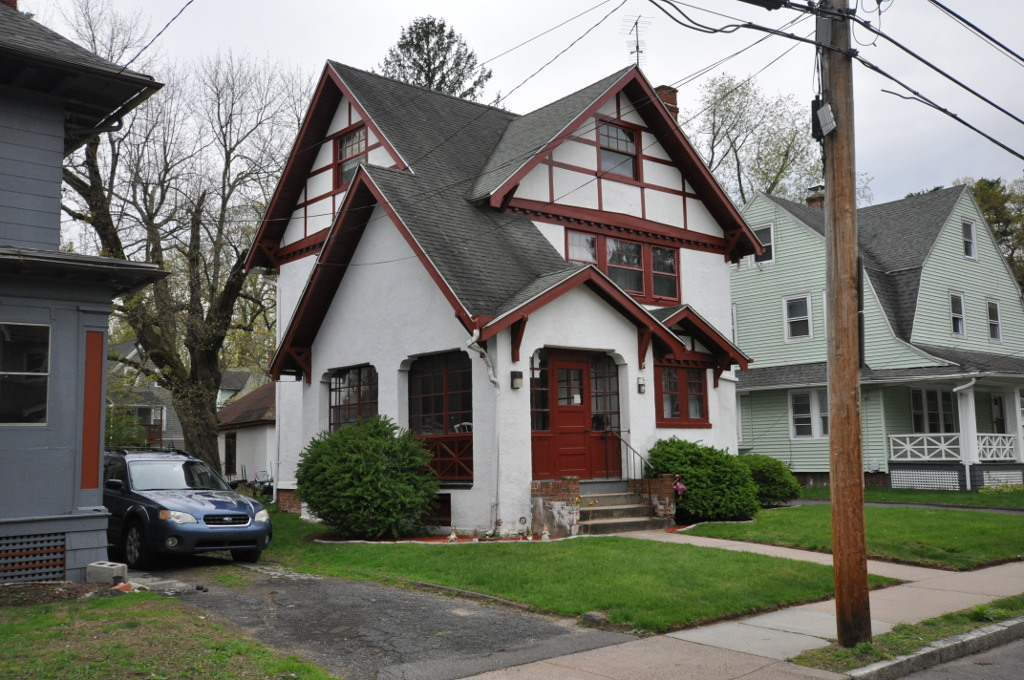

- Location within Connecticut Location within the United States
- Location: 27 Keney Terrace, Hartford, Connecticut
- Coordinates: 41°47′15″N 72°41′22″W
- Area: less than one acre
- Built: 1913
- Built by: Wright, W. Foster
- Architectural style: Tudor Revival
- Part of: Upper Albany Historic District (ID86003383)
- NRHP reference No.: 93001246

Significant dates
- Added to NRHP: December 2, 1993
- Designated CP: September 29, 1986

The Dr. Frank T. Simpson House is a historic house at 27 Keney Terrace in Hartford, Connecticut. Built in 1913, it is a good local example of Tudor Revival, and was the home of Frank T. Simpson, a leading figure in Connecticut's civil right movement of the mid-20th century. The house was listed on the National Register of Historic Places in 1993, and is a contributing property in the Upper Albany Historic District.

== Description and history ==
The Dr. Frank T. Simpson House is located in Hartford's north-side Clay-Arsenal neighborhood, on the south side of Keney Terrace, about 1/2 block east of Keney Park. It is a 2 1/2-story wood-frame structure, with a cross-gabled roof configuration and stuccoed exterior. The ground floor of the front facade is defined by a projecting gable entry on the left, and a less projecting gabled window bay aligned under the main gable. Both gables have decorative brackets, and the window gable and main gable are half-timbered. The main entrance is recessed in an arched openings. The window bay has three sash windows, and there are three larger sash windows in a band on the second floor above the projecting bay.

The house was built in 1913 by W. Foster Wright, a builder from Waterbury. It was purchased in 1952 by Dr. Frank T. and Marie A. Simpson. Simpson, an Alabama native, moved to Hartford in 1929. In 1944, he was made the first paid employee of the state's civil rights commission, one of the nation's first such organizations. Under his guidance, the commission highlighted inequities in educational and employment opportunities, and helped break down race barriers in these and other areas.

== See also ==
- National Register of Historic Places listings in Hartford, Connecticut
