= Widows' Home =

- U.S. National Register of Historic Places
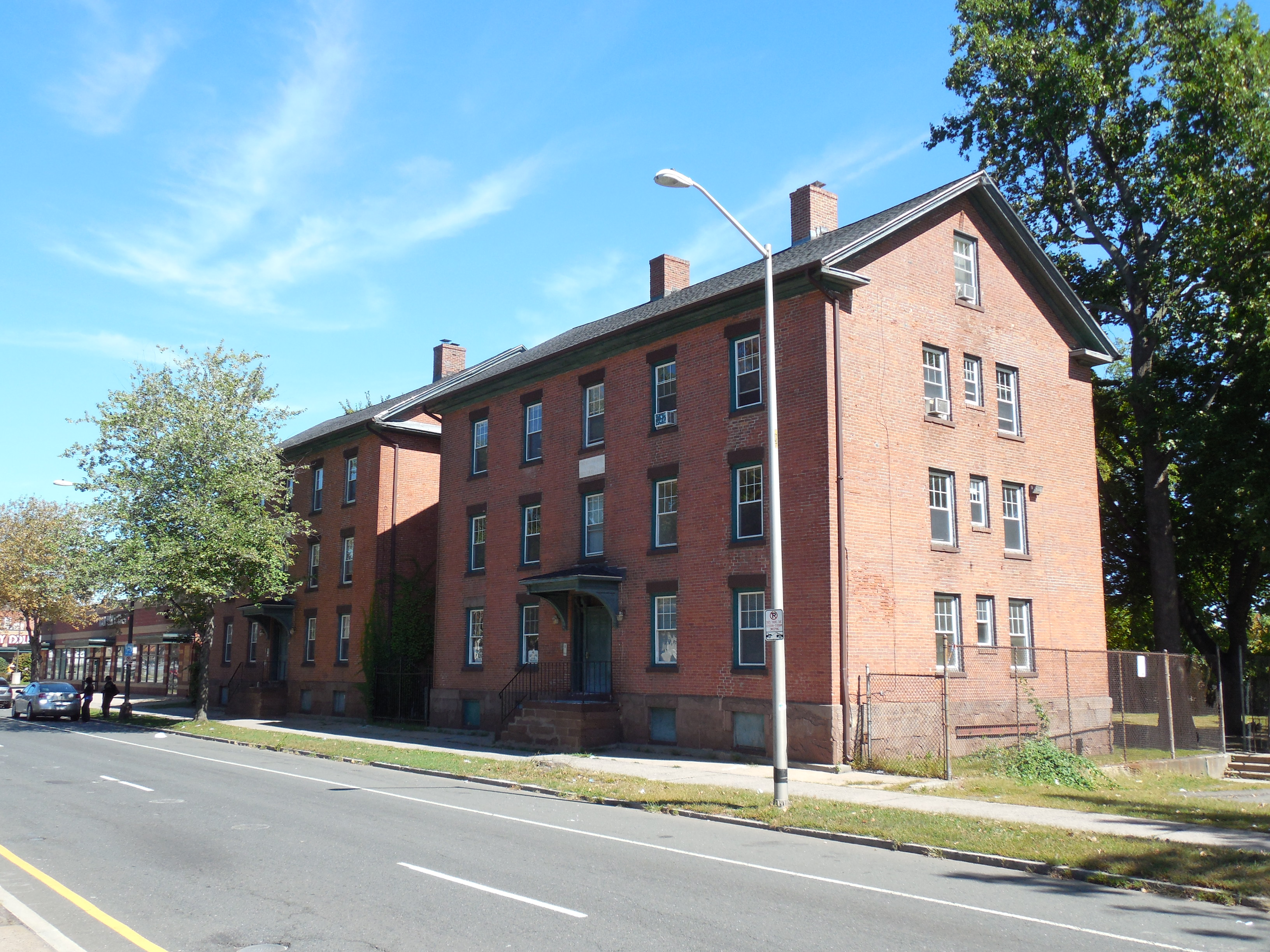

- Location within Connecticut Location within the United States
- Location: 1846-1860 North Main Street, Hartford, Connecticut
- Coordinates: 41°46′13″N 72°40′36″W
- Area: 1.5 acres (0.61 ha)
- Built: 1864
- NRHP reference No.: 83001267
- Added to NRHP: March 10, 1983

The Widows' Home is a historic social service facility at 1846-1860 North Main Street in Hartford, Connecticut. Built in 1864–65, its buildings are among the oldest in the city's North End, and a rare surviving example of a mid-19th-century facility for indigent women. It was listed on the National Register of Historic Places in 1983. The buildings have been adapted to other uses.

== Description and history ==
The former Widows' Home is located in Hartford's northern Clay-Arsenal neighborhood, on the East Side of North Main Street, opposite the Old North Cemetery between Mather and Pavilion Streets. It consists of two similar 3 1/2-story brick buildings, each covered by a side gable roof. Their facades are five bays wide, with sash windows set in rectangular openings that have brownstone sills and lintels. Each has an entrance at the center, sheltered by a rectangular hood with bracketed cornice. The doorways are framed by sidelight windows and a transom flanked by brackets. The buildings have retained some original interior features, including woodwork and fireplace surrounds.

The Widows' Home was one of a significant number of social service welfare organizations established in Hartford in the mid-19th century. This charity was established with a bequest from Lawton Ives, a local textile manufacturer active in the city's civic, social, and religious affairs. He arranged for the land on which the structures were built to be transferred to the Pearl Street Congregational Church (which he helped found), and left a bequest for the cost of the buildings, which were completed in 1864 and 1865, before his death in 1867. The home was operated by a church committee until 1969, when changing demographics and increased maintenance costs prompted its closure. The buildings were acquired by the city, and have been converted into multiunit residences.

== See also ==
- National Register of Historic Places listings in Hartford, Connecticut
