= William L. Linke House =

Historic house in Connecticut, United States

- U.S. National Register of Historic Places
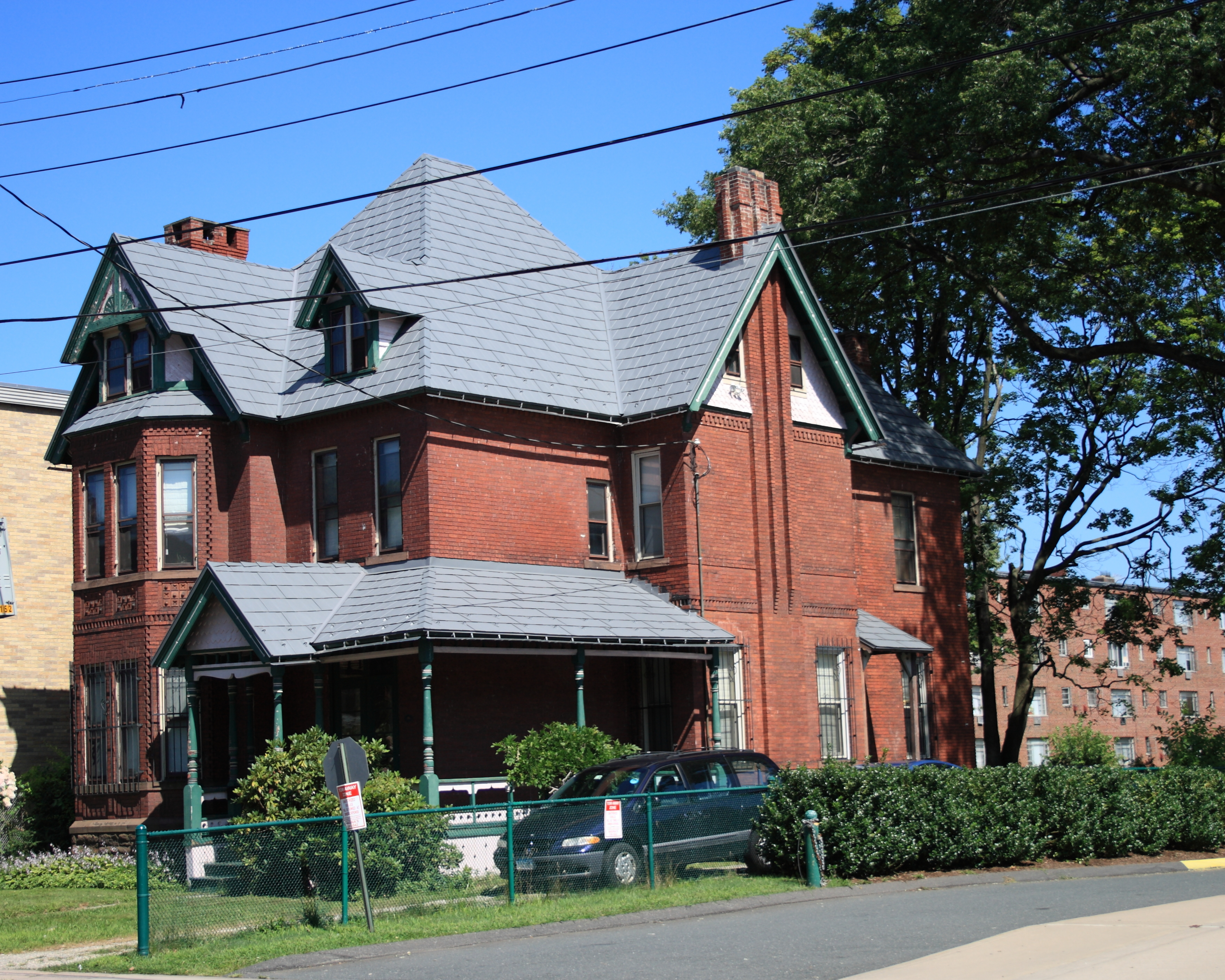

- Location within Connecticut Location within the United States
- Location: 174 Sigourney Street, Hartford, Connecticut
- Coordinates: 41°46′18″N 72°41′34″W
- Area: 0.2 acres (0.081 ha)
- Built: 1880
- Architectural style: Queen Anne
- MPS: Asylum Hill MRA
- NRHP reference No.: 83001262
- Added to NRHP: February 24, 1983

The William L. Linke House is a historic house at 174 Sigourney Street in Hartford, Connecticut. Built about 1880, it is one of a small number of surviving Queen Anne Victorians on the street, which was once lined with similar houses. It was listed on the National Register of Historic Places in 1983.

== Description and history ==
The William L. Linke House stands in Hartford's Asylum Hill neighborhood, on the east side of Sigourney Street north of Asylum Avenue. The street is now lined primarily by multiunit apartment buildings. The house is a 2 1/2-story masonry structure, built out of brick with stone trim. It has asymmetrical massing, with numerous gables and dormers projecting from its hip roof, which is . Its front porch features turned posts and carved valances, with a projecting gable above the stairs. To its left is a two-story projecting bay section with decorative brickwork and terra cotta paneling between the floors, and it is topped by a smaller wooden bay and carved wooden detail at the gable peak.

This house was built about 1880, and was typical of houses built on Sigourney Street in the late 19th century. By 1896, a local map shows the street lined with houses similar to this one. Urban redevelopment of the neighborhood, and the street's transformation into a significant north–south artery have led to the demolition of most of those houses, replaced by two-to-four story apartment blocks.

== See also ==
- National Register of Historic Places listings in Hartford, Connecticut
