= West Boulevard Historic District =

Historic district in Connecticut, United States

- U.S. National Register of Historic Places
- U.S. Historic district
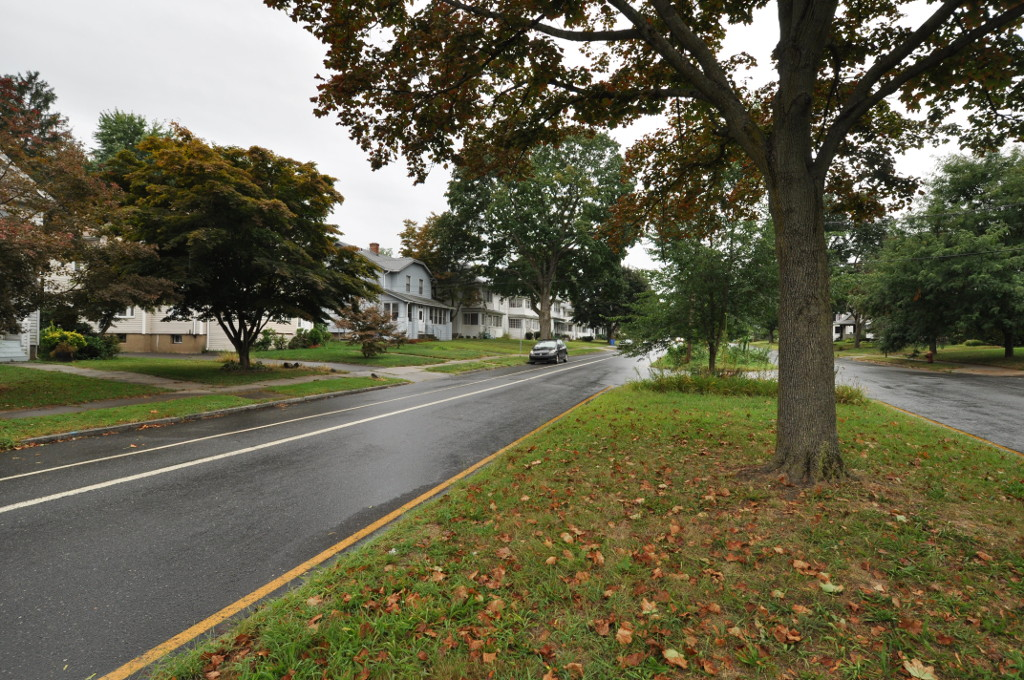

- Location within Connecticut Location within the United States
- Location: Roughly along West Boulevard, and Rodney Street, Hartford, Connecticut
- Coordinates: 41°45′41″N 72°42′38″W
- Area: 12 acres (4.9 ha)
- Built: 1909
- Architect: Zunner, George A., Sr.
- Architectural style: Colonial Revival
- NRHP reference No.: 06000615
- Added to NRHP: March 22, 2007

The West Boulevard Historic District encompasses a historic residential development on West Boulevard and Rodney Street in the West End of Hartford, Connecticut. The area was developed beginning in 1909, and most of its homes were built by a single construction firm, creating a neighborhood appearance unified by style, scale, and setting, using the principles of the then-fashionable City Beautiful movement. The district was listed on the National Register of Historic Places in 2007.

== Description and history ==
The area where West Boulevard is located in Hartford's Southwest was in the late 19th century the country estate of Horace Fox, the owner of a local lumber company. It was one of the West End's last areas of open space. Fox began considering plans for development of the land as early as 1896, when period maps show proposed routes for West Boulevard. In line with the ideas of the City Beautiful movement, Fox envisioned a broad parkway extending from Prospect Avenue in the West to Forest Street in the East. Of this vision, only the western portion was actually implemented. West Boulevard was laid out from Prospect to South Whitney Street as a four-lane boulevard with a broad central median, with shade trees planted in the median and on the flanking sides. Fox sold off house lots in the 1910s and 1920s, mainly to developers, who then built houses and sold them to generally upwardly mobile residents.

The historic district encompasses those blocks of West Boulevard, as well as about 1/2 Block North of West Boulevard on Rodney Street, which was also built out at the same time. The houses are generally unified by their scale and setback from the road, and by their wood frame construction. Stylistically they are also quite similar, with most built in the then-fashionable Colonial Revival style. Most of them were built by the development firm of Freeburg, Erickson, and Felth, and have no architect credited in city records. Andrew Freeburg, one of the principals in the firm, lived and had his principal place of business at West Boulevard and South Whitney Street.

== See also ==
- National Register of Historic Places listings in Hartford, Connecticut
