= Laurel and Marshall Streets District =

Historic district in Connecticut, United States

- U.S. National Register of Historic Places
- U.S. Historic district
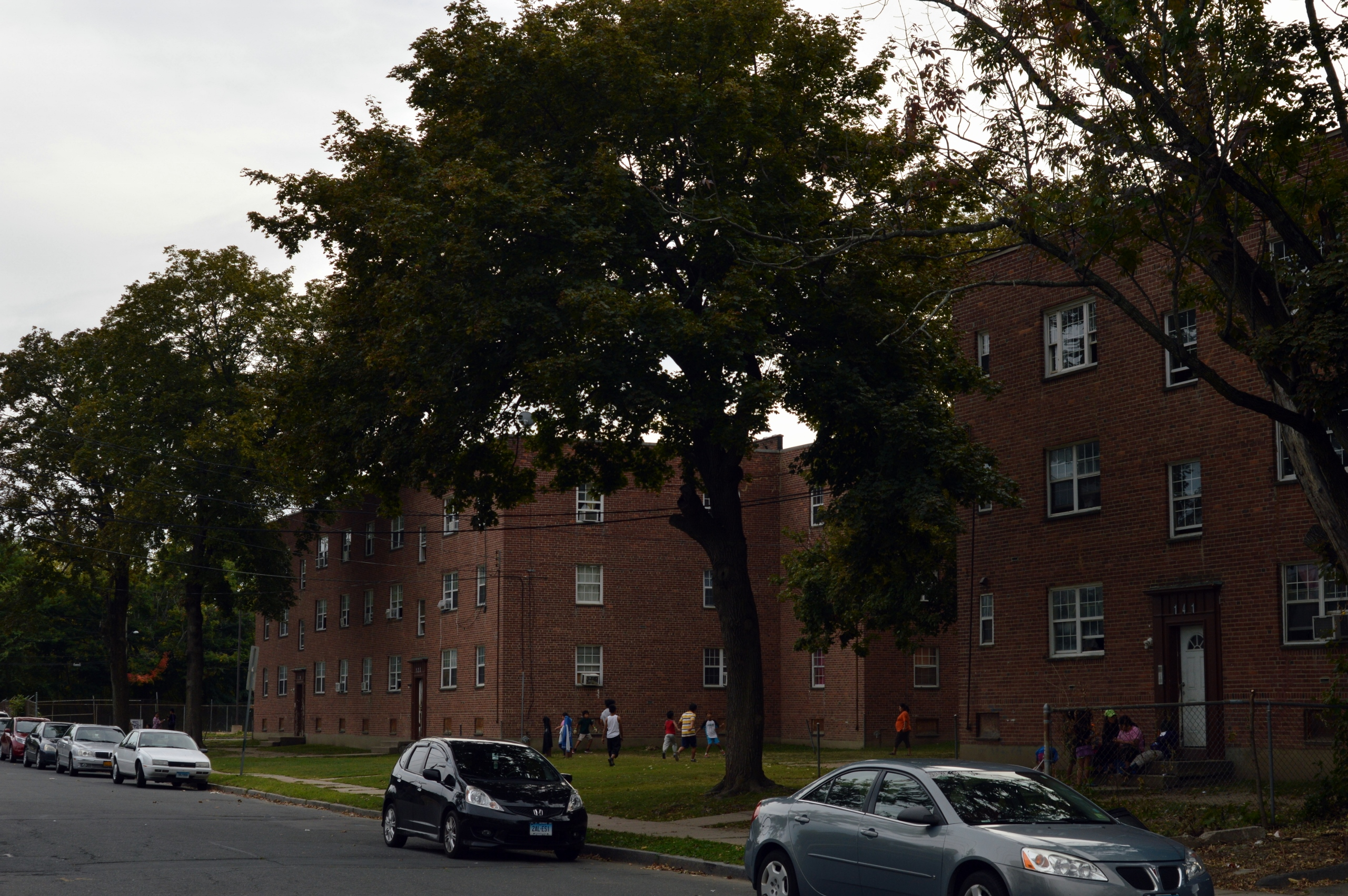

- Location within Connecticut Location within the United States
- Location: Laurel, Marshall, and Case Streets, and Farmington Avenue, Hartford, Connecticut
- Coordinates: 41°46′6″N 72°41′52″W
- Area: 23 acres (9.3 ha)
- Architect: Scoville, Albert W.
- Architectural style: Colonial Revival, Queen Anne, Shingle Style
- MPS: Asylum Hill MRA
- NRHP reference No.: 79002673
- Added to NRHP: November 29, 1979

The Laurel and Marshall Streets District is a historic district encompassing a late-19th and early-20th century residential area in the Asylum Hill neighborhood of Hartford, Connecticut. Extending along Laurel and Marshall Streets between Niles and Case Streets, its housing stock represents a significant concentration of middle-class Queen Anne architecture in the city. It was listed on the National Register of Historic Places in 1979.

== Description and history ==
Most of the area that became Laurel and Marshall Streets on Hartford's west side, was farmland until the mid-19th century, belonging to Marshall Jewell and James Niles. After the death of Marshall Jewell in 1883, the lands south of Niles Street and west of Imlay Street were developed. The area north of Farmington Avenue was developed first, with a series of primarily wood-frame houses built along Laurel and Marshall Streets. The area between Farmington Avenue and Case Street was developed last, around the turn of the 20th century. Subsequent redevelopment has resulted in the loss of a number of these early houses, replaced by more modern apartment blocks.

The historic district is bounded on the north by Niles Street and the south roughly by Case Street, including most of the historic buildings on Laurel and Marshall Streets in between. It also includes a few rowhouses of the period on Imlay Street to the east. Most of the period housing is of wood-frame construction, with typical Queen Anne styling that includes turrets, decorative cut shingles, and latticework and turned porch elements. There are a few brick houses, and several multi-family residences of the period. The west side of Marshall Street has seen to largest losses, with multiple houses demolished and replaced by more modern apartment blocks.

== See also ==
- National Register of Historic Places listings in Hartford, Connecticut
