= Myers and Gross Building =

- U.S. National Register of Historic Places
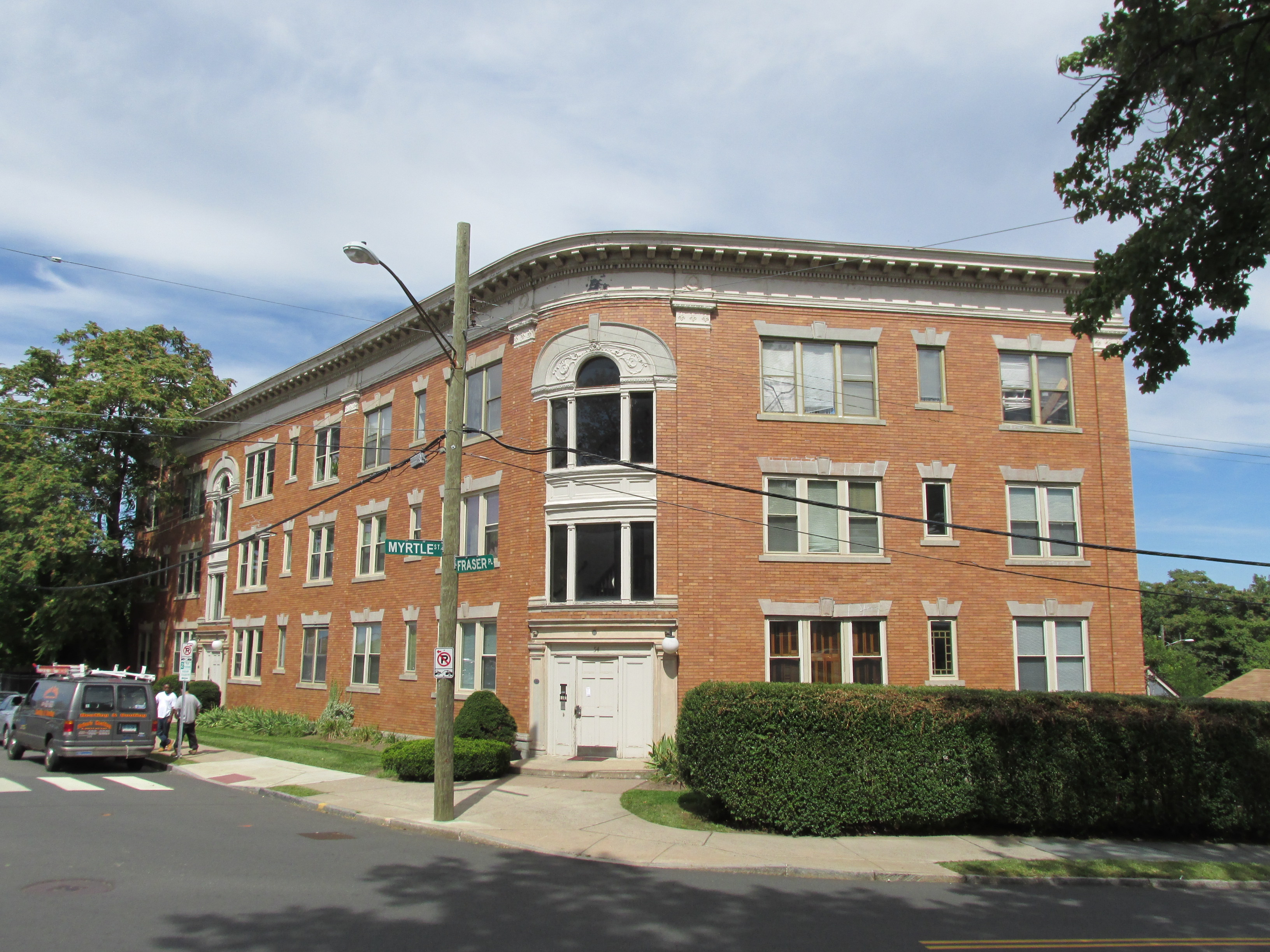

- Location within Connecticut Location within the United States
- Location: 2 Fraser Place, Hartford, Connecticut
- Coordinates: 41°46′18″N 72°41′3″W
- Area: less than one acre
- Built: 1917
- Architectural style: Colonial Revival, Neo-Colonial
- MPS: Asylum Hill MRA
- NRHP reference No.: 83001263
- Added to NRHP: March 31, 1983

The Myers and Gross Building is a historic apartment building at 2 Fraser Place in Hartford, Connecticut. Built in 1917, it is a well-preserved example of Georgian Revival architecture. It was listed on the National Register of Historic Places in 1983.

== Description and history ==
The Myers and Gross Building is located in Hartford's West Side Asylum Hill Neighborhood, at the Junction Myrtle Street and Fraser Place. It is a three-story masonry structure, built out of yellow brick with stone trim. It has a curved facade, with One Entrance at the Street Corner and a Second further along Fraser Place. The bays housing the entrances are wide, with single-leaf doors flanked by panels inside an opening trimmed with stone pilasters and entablature. Above the entrances are a three-part window on the Second Floor, and a Three-Part Palladian window in the Third Floor. Windows in the other bays are set in groups of one to three, topped by splayed lintels with keystones. The cornice is dentillated and decorated with egg-and-dart moulding.

The building was built in 1917, a time when the Asylum Hill neighborhood had ceased to be the city's fashionable upper-class area, and was becoming more middle class and commercial. The building is located close to what were at the time the headquarters of several major insurance companies.

== See also ==
- National Register of Historic Places listings in Hartford, Connecticut
