= Grandview Terrace Boulevard =

- U.S. National Register of Historic Places
- U.S. Historic district
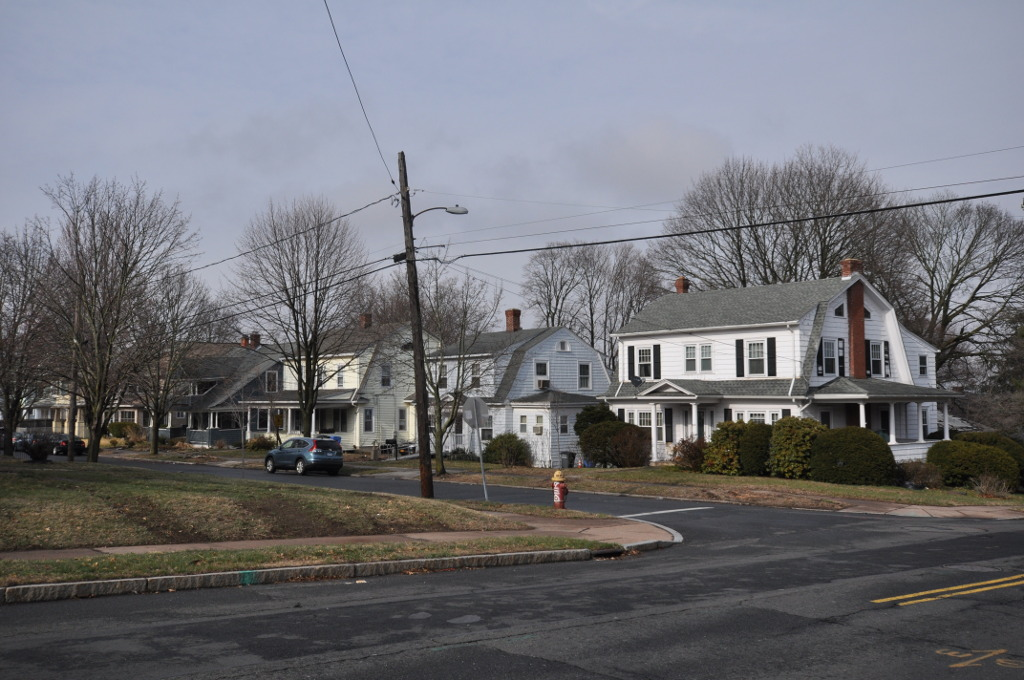

- Location within Connecticut Location within the United States
- Location: Grandview Terrace between White and Linnmoore Streets, Hartford, Connecticut
- Coordinates: 41°44′2″N 72°41′25″W
- Area: 4.5 acres (1.8 ha)
- Built: 1900
- Architect: Connor, Michael A.; et.al.
- Architectural style: Colonial Revival, Bungalow/craftsman
- NRHP reference No.: 02001624
- Added to NRHP: December 27, 2002

Grandview Terrace Boulevard is a historic district encompassing a small well-preserved early 20th-century neighborhood in Hartford, Connecticut. It extends along Grandview Terrace in Southwestern Hartford, between White and Linnmoore Streets, and includes a series of high-quality homes built mainly between 1910 and 1925. It was listed on the National Register of Historic Places in 2002.

== Description and history ==
Grandview Terrace is a residential road in Southwestern Hartford, extending from Henry Street in the North to Linnmoore Street in the South. Its Southernmost block is unusual in the City for its boulevarded nature, with a central tree-lined median. It was laid out as part of a larger subdivision in 1900, with larger lot sizes than the rest of the development. No development took place until 1910, when the first building permits were issued. Most of the seventeen houses on the block were built between then and 1925, with outbuildings such as garages generally being added at a later date.

Most of the houses in the district are of wood frame construction, and are in styles popular at the time. There is one house in brick, and another in stucco. The single most numerous style in the district is the American Foursquare, with six examples. There are two Bungalow-style houses, with the balance of houses in various revival styles. Most of the garages were added in the 1940s, although there is one built in 1910.

== See also ==
- National Register of Historic Places listings in Hartford, Connecticut
