= Lewis Street Block =

- U.S. National Register of Historic Places
- U.S. Historic district
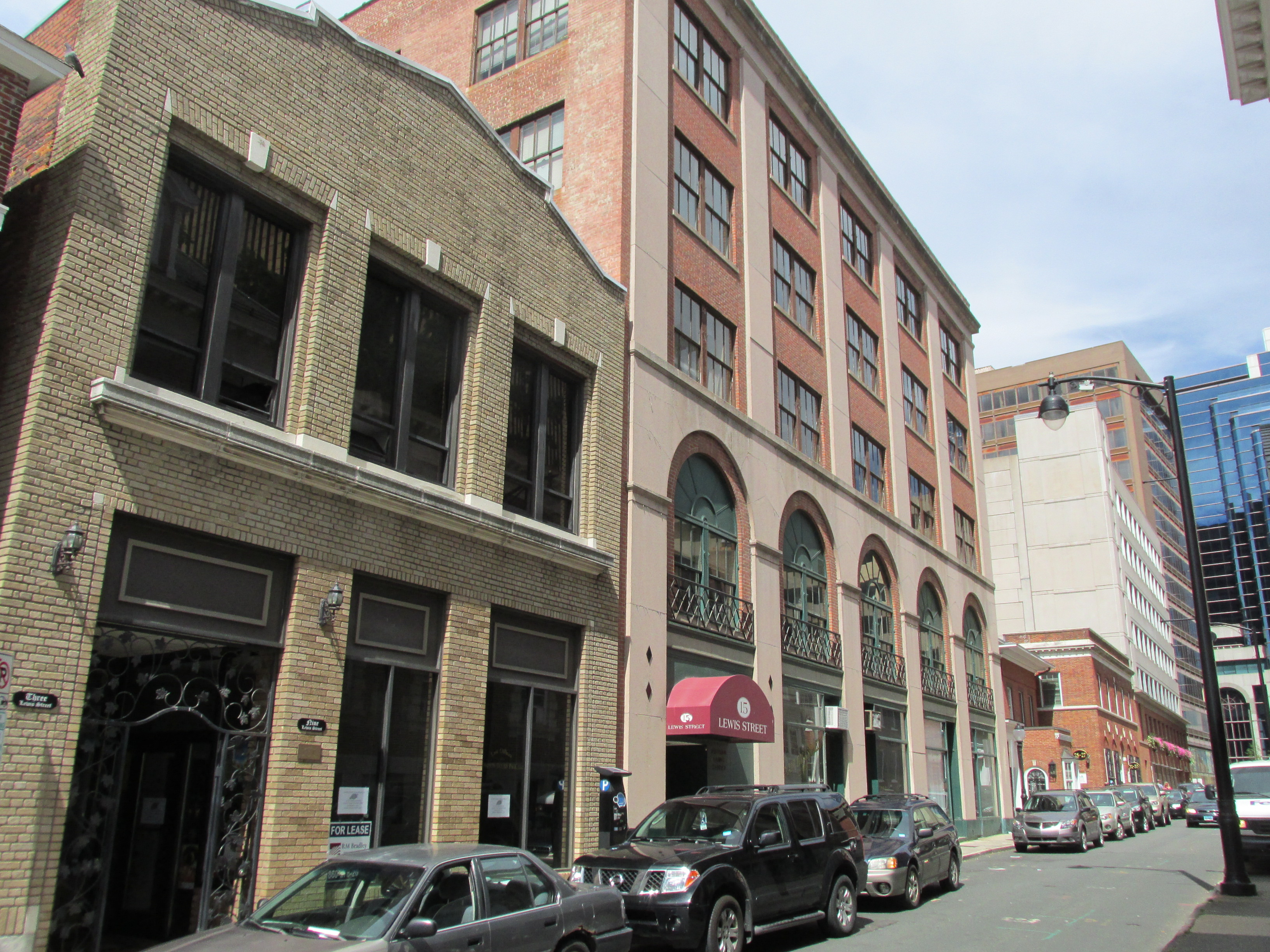

- Location within Connecticut Location within the United States
- Location: 1-33, 24-36 Lewis Street, 8-28 Trumbull Street, Hartford, Connecticut
- Coordinates: 41°45′54″N 72°40′33″W
- Area: 5 acres (2.0 ha)
- Built: 1850
- Architect: Rowell, Lewis; Et al.
- Architectural style: Greek Revival, Italianate
- NRHP reference No.: 76001991
- Added to NRHP: January 30, 1976

The Lewis Street Block is a historic district encompassing the Southern half of Lewis Street and some adjacent buildings in Downtown Hartford, Connecticut. The streetscape is reminiscent of a mid-19th century city street, with architecture extending from that period into the early 20th century. The district was listed on the National Register of Historic Places in 1976.

== Description and history ==
Lewis Street historically marked the Western Edge of Hartford's developed city center, extending North-South between Pearl and Trumbull Streets. It was deeded to the city in 1798, and was little more than an alley until 1841, when it was widened and named Wells Street. It was renamed Lewis Street in 1883, in honor of Lewis Rowell, its principal landowner. The Streetscape is divided, with the Northern End near Pearl Street now taken over by modern development. The Southern half of the block includes five buildings dating to the 1850s, and modestly scaled late 19th and early 20th-century commercial buildings. It is Downtown Hartford's only surviving example of this type of mid-to-late 19th-century streetscape.

The West Side of the Southern half of Lewis Street is lined by three 1850s houses, now adapted as commercial office space, with two low-rise office buildings built in the 1920s. The latter two are modest in scale and styled in the Classical Revival. The three houses were built in the 1850s by Lewis Rowell, one of them as his personal residence. The east side of the street has three more 1850s brick houses, possibly built by Austin Daniels, and a substantial Georgian Revival building erected in 1908 to house the church offices of the adjacent First Church of Christ. These buildings are all owned by either the church, or by Hartford's University Club.

== See also ==
- National Register of Historic Places listings in Hartford, Connecticut
