= Imlay and Laurel Streets District =

Historic district in Connecticut, United States

- U.S. National Register of Historic Places
- U.S. Historic district
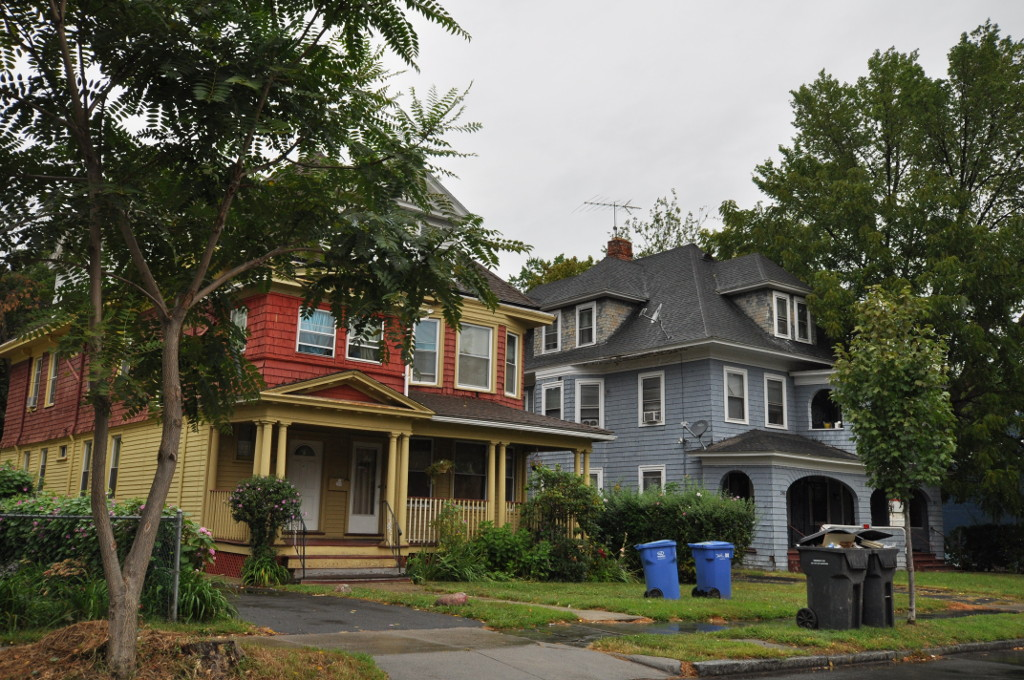

- Location within Connecticut Location within the United States
- Location: Imlay, Laurel and Sigourney Streets, Hartford, Connecticut
- Coordinates: 41°45′57″N 72°41′46″W
- Area: 20 acres (8.1 ha)
- Architectural style: Late 19th And 20th Century Revivals, Italianate, Queen Anne
- MPS: Asylum Hill MRA
- NRHP reference No.: 79002675
- Added to NRHP: November 29, 1979

The Imlay and Laurel Streets District is a residential historic district on portions of Imlay, Laurel, Hawthorn and Sigourney Streets in Hartford, Connecticut. The area is a densely built residential neighborhood developed between about 1870 and 1895, with predominantly brick Italianate and Queen Anne construction. The district was listed on the National Register of Historic Places in 1979.

== Description and history ==
Imlay and Laurel Streets in the early 19th century part of the Imlay Farm, which was developed beginning in 1853 as a residential area. The best-known portion of Imlay Farm is the Nook Farm, which became home to the city's business and cultural elites. Imlay and Laurel Streets are located between Nook Farm and the American Asylum for the Deaf, which gave Hartford's Asylum Hill neighborhood its name. They were developed as a more dense middle-class residential area, in part to provide housing for workers at the asylum. The streets were laid out in 1869, and experienced rapid development between 1880 and 1896, by which time 83 buildings had been erected. Later redevelopment has resulted in the destruction of most of these, and now fewer than 30 remain.

The historic district is bordered on the west by properties on the west side of Imlay Street, and on the east by a few properties on the west side of Sigourney Street. Its northern boundary is marked by transitions away from historic buildings on Imlay, Laurel, and Sigourney Streets, and its southern boundary includes two houses on Hawthorn Street. Most of the buildings in this area are one and two-family residences, two stories in height, and are built at least partly out of brick. There are two examples of Italianate architecture on Imlay Street, which were probably built in the 1850s, not long after development began in the area. Most of the houses have Queen Anne features, including asymmetrical facades, decorative brickwork, and porches with turned posts and other period woodwork details.

== See also ==
- National Register of Historic Places listings in Hartford, Connecticut
