= Neiditz Building =

- U.S. National Register of Historic Places
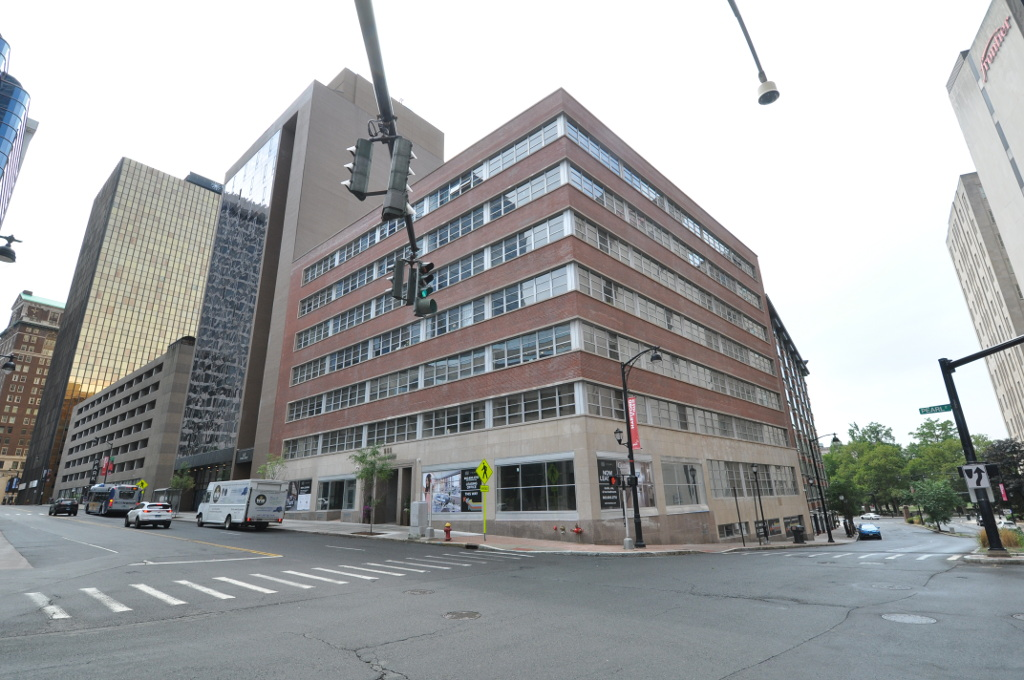

- Location within Connecticut Location within the United States
- Location: 111 Pearl Street, Hartford, Connecticut
- Coordinates: 41°45′59″N 72°40′33″W
- Area: less than one acre
- Built: 1950
- Architectural style: Modern
- NRHP reference No.: 100005238
- Added to NRHP: May 28, 2020

The Neiditz Building is a historic commercial building at 111 Pearl Street in Hartford, Connecticut. Built in 1950, it was the first major new office building to be built following the Great Depression. It was listed on the National Register of Historic Places in 2020.

== Description and history ==
The Neiditz Building is located in Downtown Hartford, at the Southeast Corner of Trumbull and Pearl Streets. It is a seven-story structure, with its basement level partially exposed due to the sloping terrain of its lot. The ground floor houses commercial spaces, while the upper floors, originally office space, have been converted to residential use. The upper levels of the building are faced in brick with ribbons of aluminum-framed windows extending across much of the width of its two street-facing facades. Its internal features included then-modern air handling systems that included ultraviolet lighting designed to kill bacteria.

== See also ==
- National Register of Historic Places listings in Hartford, Connecticut
