= Ambassador Apartments (Hartford, Connecticut) =

- U.S. National Register of Historic Places

- Location within Connecticut Location within the United States
- Location: 206-210 Farmington Avenue, Hartford, Connecticut
- Coordinates: 41°46′12″N 72°41′34″W
- Area: less than one acre
- Built: 1917
- Architect: Berenson and Moses
- Architectural style: Renaissance
- NRHP reference No.: 08000859
- Added to NRHP: October 15, 2008

The Ambassador Apartments is an historic residential complex at 206–210 Farmington Avenue in Hartford, Connecticut. Completed in 1921, it is a significant local example of Renaissance Revival architecture, designed by the prominent local firm of Berenson and Moses. It was listed on the National Register of Historic Places in 2008.

== Description and history ==
The Ambassador Apartments are located in Hartford's Asylum Hill neighborhood, just west of its downtown, on the north side of Farmington Avenue west of its junction with Sigourney Street. It is a large H-shaped building, five stories in height, its exterior consisting of load-bearing brick and cast stone walls. The front building corners consist of brick pilasters with stone capitals, with a pressed metal cornice at the roof line. The ground floor functions visually as an elevated basement, with banded stone between rectangular window openings, and round-arch entrances in the courtyard between the building wings. Second-floor windows are set in openings with bracketed cornices and sills.

The complex was built between 1917 and 1921 to a design by the prominent local architectural firm Berenson and Moses. The property was, until 1912, part of the mansion estate of Pliny Jewell, owner of a local belt manufacturer. When built, its 128 apartments featured all of the latest amenities, including a parking garage for tenant vehicles and a dining hall seating 300. The then-furnished northeast wing was damaged by fire in 1920; damage was limited by firewalls, but delayed completion of the entire building. Nicolo Carabillo, the developer, failed to turn a profit, and sold the building in 1925 to avoid foreclosure. By the 1970s, the building had declined in grandeur, and was acquired by the Aetna Insurance Company, whose headquarters are nearby. Aetna sold the building in 1999 after completing extensive rehabilitation to its apartments.

== See also ==
- National Register of Historic Places listings in Hartford, Connecticut
