= Vine Street Apartment Buildings =

- U.S. National Register of Historic Places
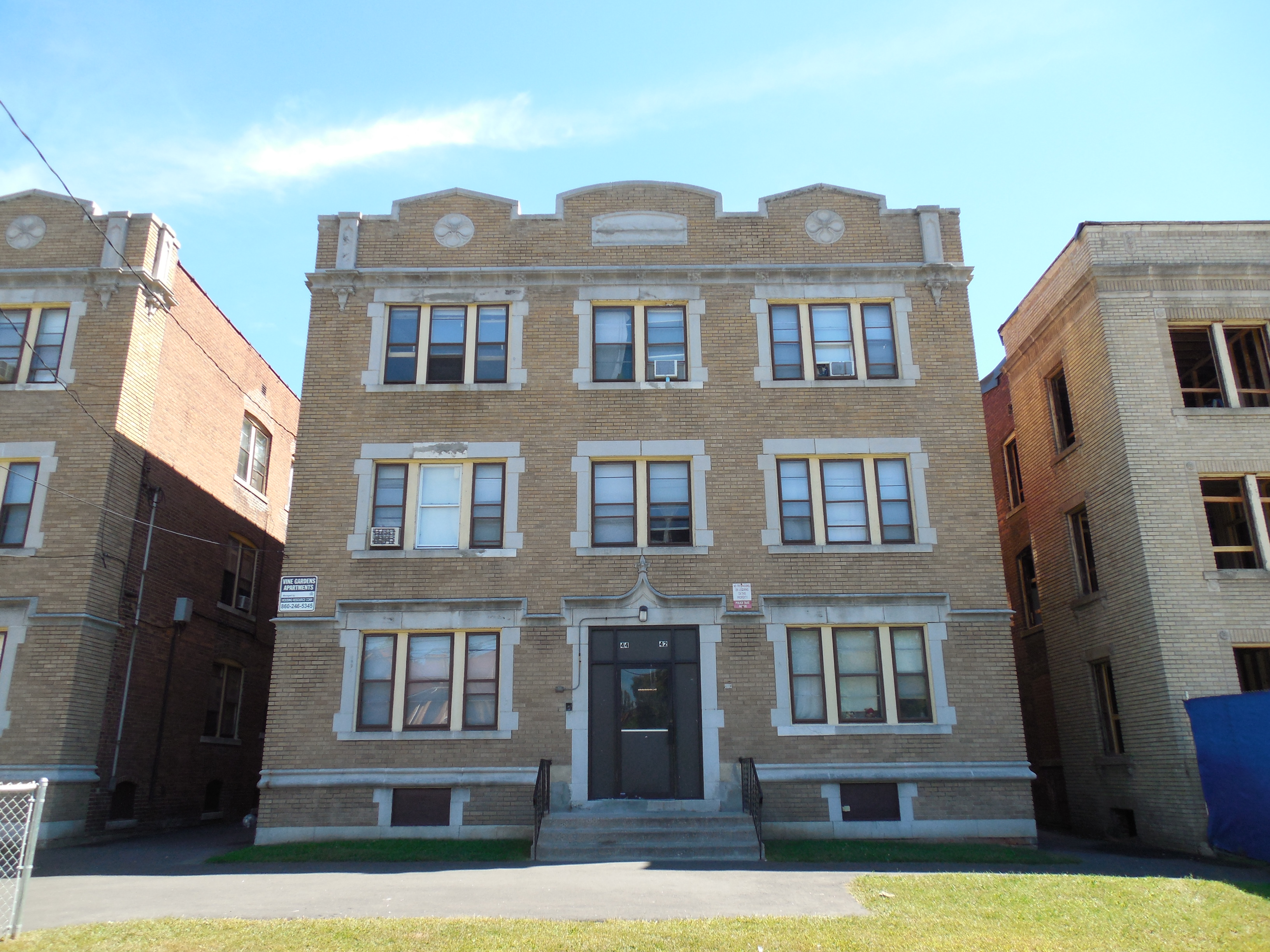

- Location within Connecticut Location within the United States
- Location: 4-48 Vine Street (Even Numbers Only), Hartford, Connecticut
- Coordinates: 41°46′48″N 72°41′17″W
- Area: 2 acres (0.81 ha)
- Built: 1922
- Architectural style: Classical Revival; Tudor Revival; Spanish Mission Revival
- NRHP reference No.: 12000002
- Added to NRHP: February 14, 2012

The Vine Street Apartment Buildings, many now known as the Horace Bushnell Apartments, are a historic collection of residential apartment blocks at 4-48 Vine Street in Hartford, Connecticut. Built between 1922 and 1925, they consist of eleven brick buildings sharing massing, scale, and setting, with a cross-section of period building styles. They were listed on the National Register of Historic Places in 2012.

== Description and history ==
The Vine Street Apartments are located in Hartford's North End residential neighborhood, occupying most of a full block on the east side of Vine Street between Albany Avenue and Mather Street. The eleven buildings are all three stories in height and are built out of brick, stone, and concrete, and share a consistent and deep setback, although the lots are not of uniform width. The first nine buildings are fronted by a shared metal picket fence with brick piers framing several openings. Five of the eleven are Classical Revival in style, while another five are Tudor Revival, and one is in the Spanish Mission style.

In the early 20th-century, the Vine Street area was part of the estate of James Junius Goodwin, an insurance and railroad magnate who was a cousin of J. Pierpont Morgan. Goodwin died in 1915, and his estate was subdivided for development as a streetcar suburb. Lots on Vine Street were sold beginning in 1922, with development taking place rapidly. Seven of the eleven buildings were designed by Harry Beckanstein, a local architect who executed many residential projects in the city. Most of his buildings in this development are simple expressions of the Classical Revival, with some Tudor details.

== See also ==
- National Register of Historic Places listings in Hartford, Connecticut
