= Lucius Barbour House =

Historic house in Connecticut, United States

- U.S. National Register of Historic Places
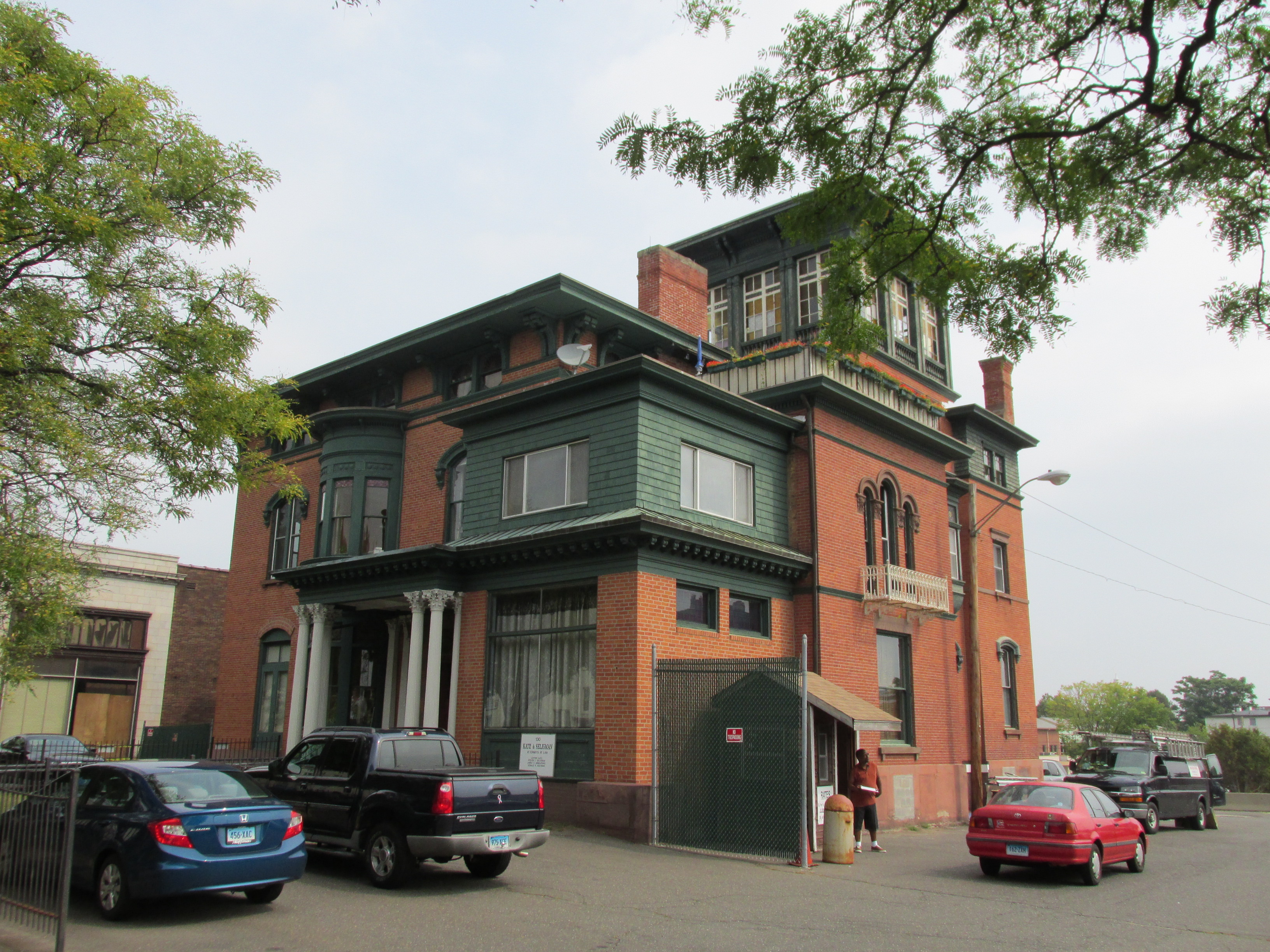

- Location within Connecticut Location within the United States
- Location: 130 Washington Street, Hartford, Connecticut
- Coordinates: 41°45′30″N 72°40′56″W
- Area: 1 acre (0.40 ha)
- Built: 1865
- Architectural style: Queen Anne, Italian Villa
- NRHP reference No.: 79002629
- Added to NRHP: August 21, 1979

The Lucius Barbour House is a historic house at 130 Washington Street in Hartford, Connecticut. Built in 1865, it is a high-quality local example of Italianate architecture executed in brick. It is also noted for its interior, which is a well-preserved later Victorian remodeling of the original. The house was listed on the National Register of Historic Places in 1979.

== Description and history ==
The Lucius Barbour House stands about three blocks south of Hartford's Capitol District, on the east side of Washington Street a short way north of Park Street. Washington Street is a major north–south artery in the city, and was historically lined with some of the city's grandest mansions. Many of them have since been demolished to make way for either commercial development or apartment buildings. The Barbour House is one of the few that survive. It is a 2 1/2-story structure, built out of red brick, with a three-story tower at the center of its southern facade. Its form is basically that of a cube, which has been embellished by projecting window bays and wrought iron porches. Many windows are set in segmented-arch openings framed by bracketed sills and lintels. The third floor of the tower is mostly banked sash windows, and the roof of both the tower and main block have projecting eaves with paired brackets. The front facade has been marred by a modern addition to the right of the entrance.

The house was built in 1865 by Lucius Barbour, who made a fortune in the dry goods business and real estate speculation. The interior was redecorated about 1890, after Barbour's son (also named Lucius) took over the property. It features elaborate Victorian woodwork, plaster, and tile in each of the public rooms, and original wall treatments from the restyling survive, including wallpaper and stencilwork. A few rooms upstairs were later redecorated with more Adamesque Colonial Revival details. The house now houses professional offices.

== See also ==
- National Register of Historic Places listings in Hartford, Connecticut
