= Oxford-Whitney Streets Historic District =

Historic district in Connecticut, United States

- Oxford-Whitney Streets District
- U.S. National Register of Historic Places
- U.S. Historic district
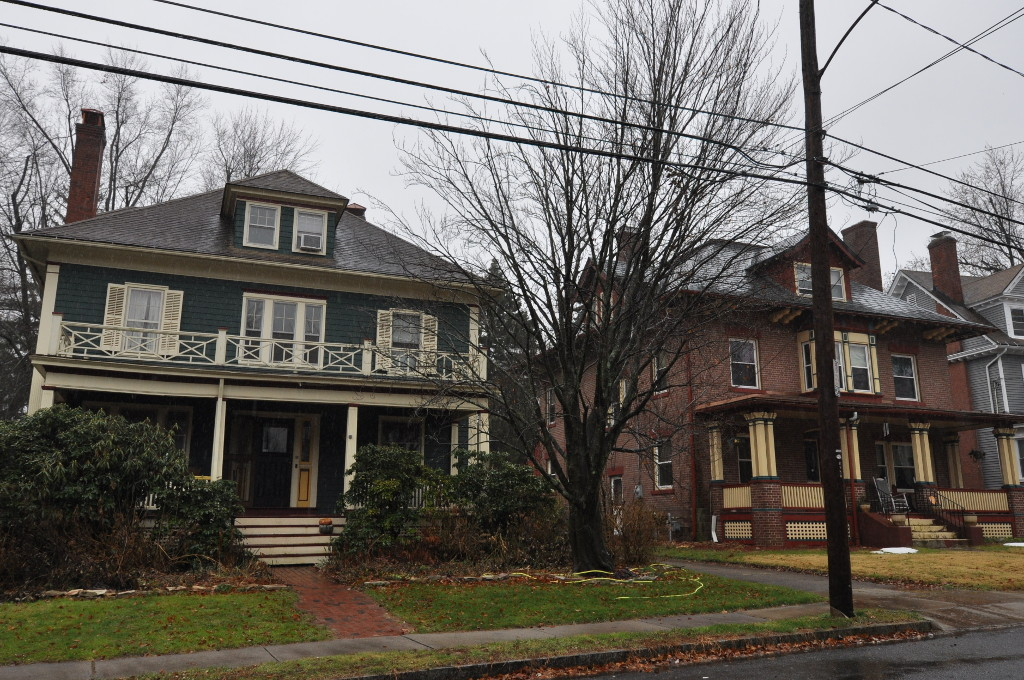
- Houses on Oxford Street

- Location within Connecticut Location within the United States
- Location: Fern Street (1 Block), Oxford Street (2 Blocks) and Whitney Street (1 Block), Hartford, Connecticut
- Coordinates: 41°46′13″N 72°42′49″W
- Area: 18 acres (7.3 ha)
- Architect: Scoville, Albert W.
- Architectural style: Colonial Revival
- NRHP reference No.: 10000896
- Added to NRHP: November 10, 2010

The Oxford-Whitney Streets District is a historic district encompassing an early-20th-century residential area in the West End Neighborhood of Hartford, the Capital City of the U.S. State of Connecticut. It extends along the East Side of Oxford Street between Elizabeth and Cone Streets, along the West Side of Whitney between Fern and Elizabeth and includes the North Side of Fern Street between Whitney and Oxford. Most of the housing, a combination of single and multi-family residences, was built between 1906 and 1919, a period later than the surrounding areas, and is predominantly Colonial Revival in character. It was listed on the National Register of Historic Places in 2010.

== Description and history ==
Most of the area that became Oxford and Whitney Streets on Hartford's West Side was farmland and country estates until roughly 1869. In the 1870s, it was platted for development by Eugene L. Kenyon, Willis Thrall, and Sylvanus Cone, but financial panics slowed the development. Albert and Alfred Gillett purchased large tracts in the area in the 1880s and began development North of a strip near Farmington Avenue. Whitney Street had been laid out by Kenyon in 1870 but was not accepted by the city until 1896, and the portion of Oxford Street between Cone and Elizabeth was laid out by the Gilletts in 1904. These areas were mostly built for the lower and middle classes housing, contrasting the earlier development, favoring upper and upper-middle-class buyers.

The historic district is bounded north by Elizabeth Street and south by Cone and Fern Streets. Oxford Street has slightly larger lot sizes and mostly one and two-family buildings. Whitney Street lots are generally smaller, and many buildings house more than three units. Most of the buildings are of wood-frame construction, although some are finished in stucco, and there are a few brick buildings in the district. Almost all are basically Colonial Revival in style and massing, although elements of Prairie, Tudor, Queen Anne and Shingle styling appear throughout the area. There are no non-residential buildings in the district. It is bounded on the south by the National Register-listed Prospect Avenue Historic District.

== See also ==
- National Register of Historic Places listings in Hartford, Connecticut
