= National Register of Historic Places listings in Hartford, Connecticut =

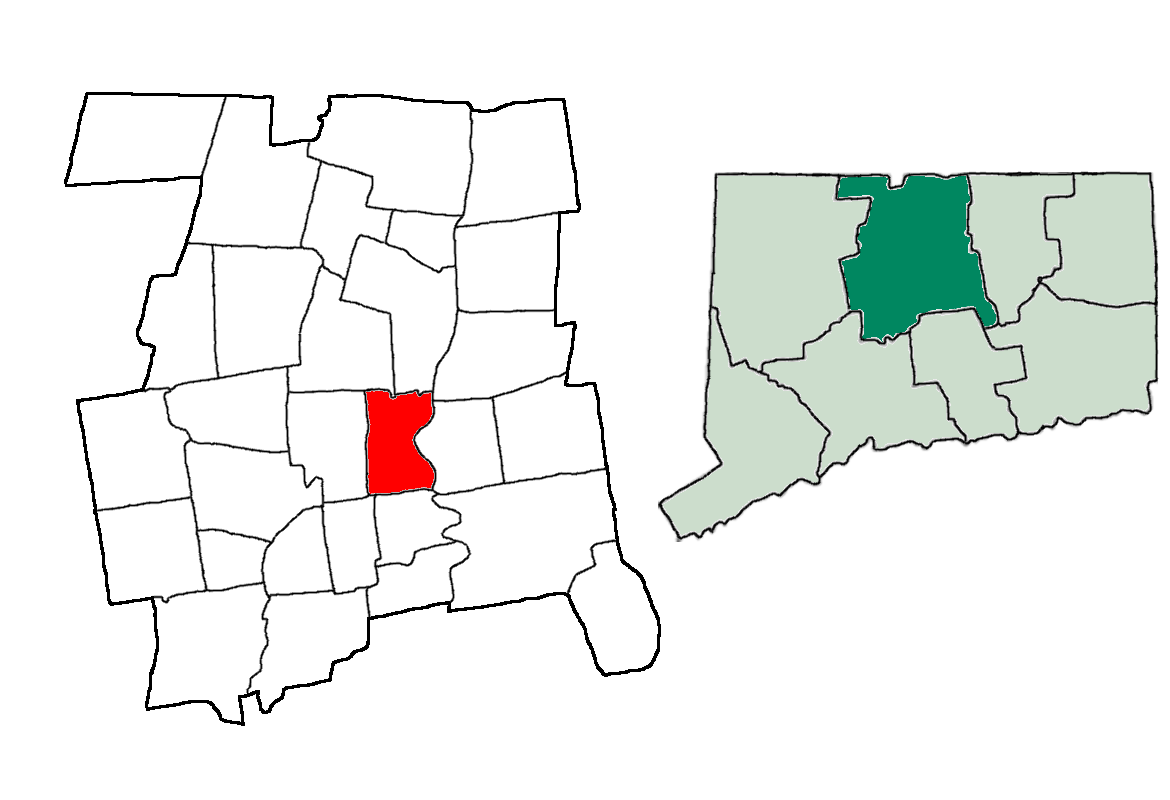
Location of Hartford in Connecticut

This is a list of properties on the National Register of Historic Places in Hartford, Connecticut.

This is intended to be a complete list of the properties and districts on the National Register of Historic Places in Hartford, Connecticut, United States. The locations of National Register properties and districts for which the latitude and longitude coordinates are included below, may be seen in various online maps.

There are more than 400 properties and districts listed on the National Register in Hartford County, including 21 National Historic Landmarks. The city of Hartford is the location of 146 of these properties and districts, including 7 National Historic Landmarks; they are listed here, while the other properties and districts in the remaining parts of the county, including 14 National Historic Landmarks, are listed separately. Eight properties and districts straddle the border between Hartford and other municipalities in the county; they appear on multiple lists.

As of 2005, about 20 percent of the properties in the city, including more than 4,000 buildings, were listed as historic properties or included in historic districts.

Contents: Counties and municipalities in Connecticut

Fairfield (city of Bridgeport | town of Greenwich | city of Stamford) | Hartford (city of Hartford | town of Southington | town of West Hartford | town of Windsor) | Litchfield | Middlesex (city of Middletown) | New Haven (city of New Haven) | New London | Tolland | Windham

This National Park Service list is complete through NPS recent listings posted September 11, 2026.

== Current listings ==
	Name on the Register	Image	Date listed	Location	Neighborhood	Description
1	Aetna Diner	Aetna Diner	August 18, 2021 (#100006804)	267 Farmington Avenue; 41°46′03″N 72°41′51″W	Asylum Hill	
2	Allen Place–Lincoln Street Historic District	Allen Place–Lincoln Street Historic District	August 28, 2003 (#03000815)	Roughly bounded by Madison Street, Washington Street, Vernon Street, and Zion Hill Cemetery; 41°45′11″N 72°41′08″W	Frog Hollow and Barry Square	
3	Ambassador Apartments	Ambassador Apartments	October 16, 2008 (#08000859)	206–210 Farmington Avenue; 41°46′04″N 72°41′40″W	Asylum Hill	
4	Ann Street Historic District	Ann Street Historic District	November 28, 1983 (#83003514)	Allyn, Ann, Asylum, Church, Hicks, and Pearl Streets; 41°46′03″N 72°40′42″W	Downtown	The district is primarily composed of 19th-century brick mercantile buildings and contains 22 contributing and 3 non-contributing properties. Some of the more significant buildings are the Sport and Medical Science Academy building, and the Central Fire Station of the Hartford Fire Department.
5	Apartment at 49–51 Spring Street	Apartment at 49–51 Spring Street	March 31, 1983 (#83001255)	49–51 Spring Street; 41°46′10″N 72°41′04″W	Asylum Hill	
6	Asylum Avenue District	Asylum Avenue District	November 29, 1979 (#79002672)	Asylum and Farmington Avenues and Sigourney Street; 41°46′10″N 72°41′36″W	Asylum Hill	
7	A. Everett Austin House	A. Everett Austin House	April 19, 1994 (#94001189)	130 Scarborough Street; 41°46′51″N 72°42′33″W	West End	Social hotspot and home of innovative Wadsworth Atheneum director Arthur Everett Austin, Jr.
8	B.P.O. Elks Lodge	B.P.O. Elks Lodge	December 23, 1984 (#84000753)	34 Prospect Street; 41°45′49″N 72°40′20″W	Downtown	An Elks building
9	Lucius Barbour House	Lucius Barbour House	August 21, 1979 (#79002629)	130 Washington Street; 41°45′30″N 72°40′56″W	Frog Hollow	
10	Boce W. Barlow Jr. House	Boce W. Barlow Jr. House	July 31, 1994 (#94000767)	31 Canterbury Street; 41°47′19″N 72°41′53″W	Blue Hills	
11	Henry Barnard House	Henry Barnard House	October 15, 1966 (#66000803)	118 Main Street; 41°45′24″N 72°40′32″W	South Green	Home of educator instrumental in the development of the American public school system.
12	Batterson Block	Batterson Block	December 23, 1984 (#84000758)	26–28 High Street; 41°46′05″N 72°40′50″W	Downtown	
13	Bedford-Garden Streets Historic District		November 21, 2023 (#100009583)	Roughly bounded by Mather Street, Brook Street and Bedford Street, 41°46′48″N 72°41′02″W		
14	Beth Hamedrash Hagodol Synagogue	Beth Hamedrash Hagodol Synagogue	May 11, 1995 (#95000577)	370 Garden Street; 41°46′44″N 72°41′06″W	Clay-Arsenal	
15	Bloomfield Avenue Meeting House	Bloomfield Avenue Meeting House	July 3, 2024 (#100010490)	50 Bloomfield Avenue; 41°47′19″N 72°42′50″W		1960s Modernist Unitarian Meeting House
16	Buckingham Square District	Buckingham Square District	June 5, 1977 (#77001404)	Main and Buckingham Street, Linden Place, and Capitol Avenue; also 248-250 Hudson Street; 41°45′37″N 72°40′35″W	Downtown	Hudson Street addresses represent a boundary increase, added on November 30, 1982
17	Building at 136–138 Collins Street	Building at 136–138 Collins Street	November 29, 1979 (#79002681)	136–138 Collins Street; 41°46′22″N 72°41′19″W	Asylum Hill	
18	Building at 142 Collins Street	Building at 142 Collins Street	November 29, 1979 (#79002680)	142 Collins Street; 41°46′18″N 72°41′20″W	Asylum Hill	
19	Building at 83–85 Sigourney Street	Building at 83–85 Sigourney Street	November 29, 1979 (#79002679)	83–85 Sigourney Street; 41°45′59″N 72°41′33″W	Asylum Hill	Demolished.
20	Bulkeley Bridge	Bulkeley Bridge	December 10, 1993 (#93001347)	Interstate 84 over the Connecticut River; 41°46′09″N 72°39′58″W	Downtown	Extends into other parts of Hartford County (East Hartford)
21	Amos Bull House	Amos Bull House	November 8, 1968 (#68000039)	59 South Prospect Street; 41°45′37″N 72°40′25″W	Downtown	
22	Bushnell Park	Bushnell Park	October 22, 1970 (#70000692)	Bounded by Elm, Jewell, and Trinity Streets; 41°45′54″N 72°40′46″W	Downtown	
23	Butler-McCook Homestead	Butler-McCook Homestead	March 11, 1971 (#71000907)	396 Main Street; 41°45′39″N 72°40′29″W	Downtown	
24	Marietta Canty House	Marietta Canty House	December 15, 2000 (#00001536)	61 Mahl Avenue; 41°46′54″N 72°40′45″W	Clay-Arsenal	
25	Capen-Clark Historic District	Capen-Clark Historic District	April 27, 1982 (#82004402)	Capen, Clark, Elmer, Barbour, Martin, and Main Streets; 41°47′11″N 72°40′42″W	Northeast	
26	Capewell Horse Nail Company	Capewell Horse Nail Company	March 1, 2000 (#99000927)	60–70 Popieluszko Street; 41°45′28″N 72°40′20″W	Sheldon-Charter Oak	
27	Cedar Hill Cemetery	Cedar Hill Cemetery	April 28, 1997 (#97000333)	453 Fairfield Avenue; 41°43′20″N 72°42′12″W	Southwest	Extends into other parts of Hartford County (Newington and Wethersfield)
28	Charter Oak Bank Building	Charter Oak Bank Building	October 11, 1978 (#78002873)	114–124 Asylum Street; 41°46′02″N 72°40′31″W	Downtown	
29	Charter Oak Place	Charter Oak Place	January 20, 1978 (#78002884)	7–40 Charter Oak Place; 41°45′33″N 72°40′27″W	Sheldon-Charter Oak	
30	Cheney Building	Cheney Building	October 6, 1970 (#78002852)	942 Main Street; 41°46′04″N 72°40′23″W	Downtown	
31	Chevry Lomday Mishnayes Synagogue	Chevry Lomday Mishnayes Synagogue	May 11, 1995 (#95000575)	148–150 Bedford Street; 41°46′46″N 72°41′01″W	Clay-Arsenal	
32	Children's Village of the Hartford Orphan Asylum	Children's Village of the Hartford Orphan Asylum	June 28, 1982 (#82004404)	1680 Albany Avenue; 41°47′11″N 72°42′37″W	Blue Hills	
33	Christ Church	Christ Church	December 29, 1983 (#83003558)	955 Main Street; 41°46′06″N 72°40′27″W	Downtown	One of the oldest Gothic revival churches in the United States.
34	Church of the Good Shepherd and Parish House	Church of the Good Shepherd and Parish House	February 20, 1975 (#75001925)	155 Wyllys Street; 41°45′26″N 72°40′09″W	Sheldon-Charter Oak	
35	Clay Hill Historic District	Clay Hill Historic District	June 16, 1983 (#83001258)	Roughly bounded by Main, Mather, Garden, and Walnut Streets; 41°46′33″N 72°40′53″W	Clay-Arsenal	
36	Collins and Townley Streets District	Collins and Townley Streets District	November 29, 1979 (#79002676)	Collins and Townley Streets; 41°46′20″N 72°41′44″W	Asylum Hill	
37	Colt Industrial District	Colt Industrial District	June 8, 1976 (#76001987)	Roughly bounded by Wawarme, Wethersfield, Hendricxsen, Van Dyke Avenues, Stonington, Masseek, Sequassen Streets, Vredendale Avenue; 41°45′12″N 72°40′05″W	Sheldon-Charter Oak	This industrial district includes the Colt Fire Arms factory complex, three manager houses, and worker housing; the second set of addresses represents a boundary increase. The entire district is included in the Coltsville Historic District, which was designated a National Historic Landmark District in 2008.
38	James B. Colt House	James B. Colt House	April 14, 1975 (#75001926)	154 Wethersfield Avenue; 41°45′06″N 72°40′27″W	Sheldon-Charter Oak	
39	Coltsville Historic District	Coltsville Historic District	November 13, 1966 (#66000802)	Sheldon-Charter Oak neighborhood 41°45′14″N 72°40′29″W	Sheldon-Charter Oak	Includes Armsmear, Colt Armory, Colt Park, and other properties related to Samuel Colt.
40	Congress Street	Congress Street	October 6, 1975 (#75001927)	Both sides of Congress Street from Wyllys to Morris Streets; also 54, 56, and 58 Maple Avenue; 41°45′16″N 72°40′34″W	South Green	Maple Ave. addresses represent a boundary increase, added on July 24, 1992
41	Connecticut State Capitol	Connecticut State Capitol	December 30, 1970 (#70000834)	Capitol Avenue; 41°45′51″N 72°40′58″W	Downtown	Designed by Richard Upjohn in Gothic and French Renaissance styles topped by gold leaf dome
42	Connecticut State Library and Supreme Court Building	Connecticut State Library and Supreme Court Building	June 4, 1981 (#81000535)	231 Capitol Avenue; 41°45′45″N 72°41′01″W	Downtown	
43	Connecticut Statehouse	Connecticut Statehouse	October 15, 1966 (#66000878)	Main Street at Central Row; 41°45′58″N 72°40′23″W	Downtown	Federal style building by Charles Bulfinch
44	Day House	Day House	April 16, 1971 (#71000909)	77 Forest Street; 41°46′03″N 72°42′02″W	Asylum Hill	Also known as the Chamberlin-Burr Day House, it is the headquarters of the Harriet Beecher Stowe Center
45	Calvin Day House	Calvin Day House	December 18, 1978 (#78002872)	105 Spring Street; 41°46′16″N 72°41′03″W	Asylum Hill	
46	Day-Taylor House	Day-Taylor House	April 14, 1975 (#75001930)	81 Wethersfield Avenue; 41°45′14″N 72°40′32″W	South Green	
47	Department Store Historic District	Department Store Historic District	March 23, 1995 (#95000284)	884–956 Main Street and 36 Talcott Street; 41°46′05″N 72°40′22″W	Downtown	This historic district includes the Sage-Allen Building, built in 1898. This department store building, which has been restored, now contains both retail space and luxury apartments. As part of the restoration project, an adjacent 1960s building was given a new historically sensitive façade to make it more compatible with its neighbor.
48	Dillon Building	Dillon Building	February 11, 1982 (#82004407)	69–71 Pratt Street; 41°46′02″N 72°40′30″W	Downtown	
49	Downtown North Historic District	Downtown North Historic District	May 6, 2004 (#04000390)	Roughly Ann, Atlant, Ely, High, Main, and Pleasant Streets; 41°46′19″N 72°40′38″W	Downtown	A predominantly residential area located around Main Street and High Street north of Interstate 84 and south of the Amtrak railroad tracks; a diverse variety of Mid-19th Century Revival and Late Victorian styles of architecture are represented.
50	Elizabeth Park	Elizabeth Park	March 10, 1983 (#83001259)	Asylum Avenue; 41°46′20″N 72°43′04″W	West End	Extends into West Hartford, elsewhere in Hartford County
51	Elm Street Historic District	Elm Street Historic District	June 28, 1984 (#84001003)	71–166 Capitol Avenue, 55–97 Elm Street, 20–30 Trinity Street; 41°45′44″N 72°40′48″W	Downtown	Located in the vicinity of Trinity Street in front of the State Capitol.
52	Engine Company 1 Fire Station	Engine Company 1 Fire Station	March 2, 1989 (#89000025)	197 Main Street and 36 John Street; 41°45′29″N 72°40′35″W	South Green	
53	Engine Company 15 Fire Station	Engine Company 15 Fire Station	March 2, 1989 (#89000023)	8 Fairfield Avenue; 41°44′31″N 72°41′32″W	Barry Square	
54	Engine Company 16 Fire Station	Engine Company 16 Fire Station	March 2, 1989 (#89000021)	636 Blue Hills Avenue; 41°48′15″N 72°41′44″W	Blue Hills	
55	Engine Company 2 Fire Station	Engine Company 2 Fire Station	March 2, 1989 (#89000022)	1515 Main Street; 41°46′30″N 72°40′39″W	Clay-Arsenal	Second firehouse built for company, in 1910, uses Italian Renaissance Revival style unusual for firehouses. One of only two left in the city that were originally built to accommodate horses.
56	Engine Company 6 Fire Station	Engine Company 6 Fire Station	March 2, 1989 (#89000020)	34 Huyshope Avenue; 41°45′26″N 72°39′59″W	Sheldon-Charter Oak	
57	Engine Company 9 Fire Station	Engine Company 9 Fire Station	March 2, 1989 (#89000024)	655 New Britain Avenue; 41°44′00″N 72°42′13″W	Southwest	
58	Fairfield Avenue Historic District	Fairfield Avenue Historic District	July 19, 2011 (#11000435)	Roughly along Fairfield Avenue from Trinity College to Cedar Hill Cemetery; 41°44′06″N 72°41′34″W	Barry Square and Southwest	
59	First Church of Christ and the Ancient Burying Ground	First Church of Christ and the Ancient Burying Ground	December 5, 1972 (#72001324)	60 Gold Street; 41°45′52″N 72°40′26″W	Downtown	
60	First National Bank Building	First National Bank Building	December 23, 1984 (#84000766)	50–58 State House Square; 41°45′59″N 72°40′21″W	Downtown	
61	Footguard Hall	Footguard Hall	December 23, 1984 (#84000771)	159 High Street; 41°46′14″N 72°40′47″W	Downtown	
62	Fourth Congregational Church	Fourth Congregational Church	April 12, 1982 (#82004409)	Albany Avenue and Vine Street; 41°46′47″N 72°41′23″W	Upper Albany	
63	Frog Hollow	Frog Hollow	April 11, 1979 (#79002635)	Roughly bounded by Park River, Capitol Avenue, Oak, Washington, and Madison Streets and Park Terrace; also bounded by Park Terrace, Hillside Avenue, and Hamilton and Summit Streets; 41°45′30″N 72°41′27″W	Frog Hollow	Second set of addresses represents a boundary increase, added on March 1, 1984
64	Fuller Brush Company Factory Complex	Fuller Brush Company Factory Complex	April 7, 2025 (#100011608)	3580 Main Street; 41°48′01″N 72°39′41″W		
65	Goodwin Block	Goodwin Block	March 26, 1976 (#76001990)	219–257 Asylum Street, 5–17 Hayes Street, 210–228 Pearl Street; 41°46′00″N 72°40′40″W	Downtown	
66	Grandview Terrace Boulevard	Grandview Terrace Boulevard	December 27, 2002 (#02001624)	Roughly along Grandview Terrace; 41°44′02″N 72°41′25″W	Barry Square	
67	Hartford Club	Hartford Club	December 23, 1984 (#84000779)	46 Prospect Street; 41°45′51″N 72°40′19″W	Downtown	
68	Hartford Electric Light Company Maple Avenue Sub-Station	Hartford Electric Light Company Maple Avenue Sub-Station	August 11, 2000 (#00000833)	686 Maple Avenue; 41°44′30″N 72°41′00″W	Barry Square	
69	Hartford Golf Club Historic District	Hartford Golf Club Historic District	June 26, 1986 (#86001370)	Roughly bounded by Simsbury Road and Bloomfield Avenue, Northmoor Road, Albany Avenue, and Mohegan Drive; 41°47′33″N 72°43′31″W	West End	Extends into West Hartford, elsewhere in Hartford County
70	Hartford National Bank and Trust	Hartford National Bank and Trust	October 14, 2014 (#14000867)	777 Main & 33 Asylum Streets; 41°45′59″N 72°40′25″W	Downtown	Now known as 777 Main Street
71	Hartford Seminary Foundation	Hartford Seminary Foundation	June 22, 1982 (#82004411)	55 Elizabeth Street and 72-120 Sherman Street; 41°46′15″N 72°42′26″W	West End	Listing includes buildings now used by the University of Connecticut Law School as well as buildings still used by the seminary.
72	Hartford Special Machinery Company Complex		January 25, 2022 (#100007374)	287 and 296 Homestead Avenue; 41°46′47″N 72°42′00″W		
73	Hartford Union Station	Hartford Union Station	November 25, 1975 (#75001932)	Union Place; 41°46′07″N 72°40′56″W	Downtown	1889 Richardsonian Romanesque station rebuilt after 1914 fire.
74	High Street Historic District	High Street Historic District	July 8, 1998 (#98000850)	402–418 Asylum Street, 28 High Street, and 175–189 Allyn Street; 41°46′03″N 72°40′51″W	Downtown	This district consists of three properties on the block of High Street between Allyn and Asylum Streets: the Judd and Root Building, the Batterson Block (each also listed separately), and the Capitol Building.
75	John and Isabella Hooker House	John and Isabella Hooker House	November 29, 1979 (#79002678)	140 Hawthorn Street; 41°45′49″N 72°42′01″W	Asylum Hill	
76	Hotel America	Hotel America	September 7, 2012 (#12000359)	5 Constitution Plaza; 41°46′00″N 72°40′11″W	Downtown Hartford	Later the Clarion; now luxury apartments
77	House at 140 and 144 Retreat Avenue	House at 140 and 144 Retreat Avenue	February 25, 1982 (#82004412)	140 and 144 Retreat Avenue; 41°45′09″N 72°40′49″W	South Green	
78	House at 36 Forest Street	House at 36 Forest Street	February 24, 1983 (#83001261)	36 Forest Street; 41°45′51″N 72°42′01″W	Asylum Hill	Intact 1885 Shingle Style house is one of few 19th-century houses left on street
79	Hyde-St. John House	Hyde-St. John House	October 6, 1977 (#77001422)	25 Charter Oak Avenue; 41°45′33″N 72°40′27″W	Sheldon-Charter Oak	
80	Imlay and Laurel Streets District	Imlay and Laurel Streets District	November 29, 1979 (#79002675)	Imlay, Laurel and Sigourney Streets; 41°45′57″N 72°41′46″W	Asylum Hill	
81	Isham-Terry House	Isham-Terry House	February 11, 1982 (#82004413)	211 High Street; 41°46′17″N 72°40′45″W	Downtown	
82	James Pratt Funeral Service	James Pratt Funeral Service	November 29, 1979 (#79002677)	69 Farmington Avenue; 41°45′59″N 72°41′29″W	Asylum Hill	Demolished.
83	Jefferson-Seymour District	Jefferson-Seymour District	May 4, 1979 (#79002661)	Cedar, Wadsworth, Seymour and Jefferson Streets; 41°45′27″N 72°40′50″W	South Green	
84	Wilfred X. Johnson House	Wilfred X. Johnson House	July 31, 1994 (#94000765)	206 Tower Avenue; 41°47′58″N 72°40′22″W	Northeast	
85	Judd and Root Building	Judd and Root Building	December 23, 1984 (#84000784)	175–189 Allyn Street and 5–23 High Street; 41°46′06″N 72°40′52″W	Downtown	
86	Keney Tower	Keney Tower	March 30, 1978 (#78002871)	Main and Ely Streets; 41°46′23″N 72°40′36″W	Downtown	
87	Laurel and Marshall Streets District	Laurel and Marshall Streets District	November 29, 1979 (#79002673)	Laurel, Marshall, and Case Streets, and Farmington Avenue; 41°46′06″N 72°41′52″W	Asylum Hill	
88	Lewis Street Block	Lewis Street Block	January 30, 1976 (#76001991)	1–33, 24–36 Lewis Street, 8–28 Trumbull Street; 41°45′54″N 72°40′33″W	Downtown	
89	William L. Linke House	William L. Linke House	February 24, 1983 (#83001262)	174 Sigourney Street; 41°46′18″N 72°41′34″W	Asylum Hill	
90	Little Hollywood Historic District	Little Hollywood Historic District	April 29, 1982 (#82004423)	Farmington Avenue, Owen, Frederick and Denison Streets; 41°45′58″N 72°42′20″W	West End	
91	Lyman House	Lyman House	October 31, 1975 (#75001938)	22 Woodland Street; 41°46′08″N 72°42′08″W	Asylum Hill	
92	Main Street Historic District No. 2	Main Street Historic District No. 2	December 23, 1984 (#84001272)	West Main, North Central Row, East Prospect Streets, and North Atheneum Square; 41°45′52″N 72°40′23″W	Downtown	One city block, including the landmark Travelers Tower.
93	Mansuy and Smith Automobile Showroom Building	Mansuy and Smith Automobile Showroom Building	December 20, 2016 (#16000867)	38–42 Elm Street; 41°45′44″N 72°40′31″W	Downtown	
94	Mather Homestead	Mather Homestead	April 29, 1982 (#82004426)	2 Mahl Avenue; 41°46′54″N 72°40′36″W	Clay-Arsenal	
95	Metropolitan African Methodist Episcopal Zion Church	Metropolitan African Methodist Episcopal Zion Church	July 22, 1994 (#94000769)	2051 Main Street; 41°46′58″N 72°40′37″W	Clay-Arsenal	
96	Municipal Building	Municipal Building	April 27, 1981 (#81000536)	550 Main Street; 41°45′45″N 72°40′26″W	Downtown	Beaux-arts structure built with financial support from J. P. Morgan.
97	Myers and Gross Building	Myers and Gross Building	March 31, 1983 (#83001263)	2 Fraser Place; 41°46′17″N 72°41′02″W	Asylum Hill	
98	Neiditz Building	Neiditz Building	May 28, 2020 (#100005238)	111 Pearl Street; 41°45′59″N 72°40′33″W	Downtown	
99	Nook Farm and Woodland Street District	Nook Farm and Woodland Street District	November 29, 1979 (#79002674)	Woodland, Gillett, and Forest Streets, and Farmington Avenue; 41°46′07″N 72°42′03″W	Asylum Hill	
100	Northam Memorial Chapel and Gallup Memorial Gateway	Northam Memorial Chapel and Gallup Memorial Gateway	June 29, 1982 (#82004428)	453 Fairfield Avenue; 41°43′36″N 72°41′30″W	Southwest	
101	North-West School	North-West School	June 10, 2010 (#10000339)	1240 Albany Avenue; 41°46′57″N 72°41′48″W	Upper Albany	
102	Old North Cemetery	Old North Cemetery	August 6, 1998 (#98000964)	1821 Main Street; 41°46′48″N 72°40′42″W	Clay-Arsenal	
103	Oxford-Whitney Streets Historic District	Oxford-Whitney Streets Historic District	November 10, 2010 (#10000896)	Fern Street (1 block), Oxford Street (4 blocks) and Whitney Street (1 block); 41°46′13″N 72°42′49″W	West End	
104	Parkside Historic District	Parkside Historic District	May 31, 1984 (#84001048)	176–230 Wethersfield Avenue; 41°45′01″N 72°40′26″W	Sheldon-Charter Oak	
105	Parkville Historic District	Parkville Historic District	March 31, 2015 (#15000112)	Roughly bounded by I-84, Park Highway, Francis Court, New Park & Sisson Avenues; 41°45′13″N 72°42′28″W	Parkville	
106	Perkins-Clark House	Perkins-Clark House	December 14, 1978 (#78002870)	49 Woodland Street; 41°46′15″N 72°42′10″W	Asylum Hill	
107	Phoenix Life Insurance Company Building	Phoenix Life Insurance Company Building	January 21, 2005 (#04001462)	One American Row; 41°45′55″N 72°40′14″W	Downtown	The world's first two-sided building.
108	Polish National Home	Polish National Home	October 20, 1983 (#83003566)	60 Charter Oak Avenue; 41°45′33″N 72°40′18″W	Sheldon-Charter Oak	
109	Arthur G. Pomeroy House	Arthur G. Pomeroy House	February 4, 1982 (#82004429)	490 Ann Street; 41°46′19″N 72°40′39″W	Downtown	
110	Pratt Street Historic District	Pratt Street Historic District	March 10, 1983 (#83001264)	31–101 and 32–110 Pratt Street; 196–260 Trumbull Street; 41°46′04″N 72°40′30″W	Downtown	
111	Prospect Avenue Historic District	Prospect Avenue Historic District	August 29, 1985 (#85001918)	Roughly bounded by Albany Avenue, North Branch Park River, Elizabeth and Fern Streets, Prospect and Asylum Avenues, and Sycamore Road; 41°46′43″N 72°42′38″W	West End	Extends into West Hartford, elsewhere in Hartford County
112	Royal Typewriter Company Building	Royal Typewriter Company Building	February 23, 1989 (#84003898)	150 New Park Avenue; 41°45′07″N 72°42′35″W	Parkville	Demolished.
113	Saint Anthony Hall	Saint Anthony Hall	May 9, 1985 (#85001017)	340 Summit Street; 41°45′06″N 72°41′35″W	Barry Square	
114	St. Paul's Methodist Episcopal Church	St. Paul's Methodist Episcopal Church	August 2, 1984 (#84001051)	1886–1906 Park Street; 41°45′24″N 72°42′37″W	Parkville	
115	Sts. Cyril and Methodius Church	Sts. Cyril and Methodius Church	June 30, 1983 (#83001254)	63 Governor Street; 41°45′29″N 72°40′23″W	Sheldon-Charter Oak	
116	Second Church of Christ	Second Church of Christ	January 9, 1978 (#78002836)	307 Main Street; 41°45′35″N 72°40′32″W	Downtown	
117	Sigourney Square District	Sigourney Square District	January 16, 1979 (#79002660)	Sargeant, Ashley, and May Streets; also 216-232 Garden Street; also 207 Garden Street; 41°46′28″N 72°41′33″W	Asylum Hill	Garden Street addresses represent boundary increases added December 21, 1983 and September 13, 2011
118	Dr. Frank T. Simpson House	Dr. Frank T. Simpson House	December 2, 1993 (#93001246)	27 Keney Terrence; 41°47′15″N 72°41′22″W	Northeast	
119	Sisson-South Whitney Historic District	Sisson-South Whitney Historic District	July 24, 2013 (#13000526)	Roughly bounded by West Boulevard, South Whitney Street, Farmington & Sisson Avenues; 41°45′51″N 72°42′32″W	West End	
120	South Green Historic District	South Green Historic District	November 17, 1977 (#02001453)	Roughly along Wethersfield Avenue, Alden and Morris Streets; 41°45′08″N 72°40′32″W	South Green	
121	Southern New England Telephone Company Building	Southern New England Telephone Company Building	May 12, 2004 (#04000417)	55 Trumbull Street; 41°45′56″N 72°40′36″W	Downtown	1930s Art Deco granite-and-limestone 12-story building facing Bushnell Park
122	Spencer House	Spencer House	February 24, 1983 (#83001265)	1039 Asylum Avenue; 41°46′18″N 72°42′00″W	Asylum Hill	
123	Spring Grove Cemetery	Spring Grove Cemetery	January 20, 2011 (#08001203)	2035 Main Street; 41°46′57″N 72°40′34″W	Clay-Arsenal	
124	Stackpole, Moore, and Tryon Building	Stackpole, Moore, and Tryon Building	October 19, 1978 (#78002869)	105–115 Asylum Street; 41°46′00″N 72°40′33″W	Downtown	
125	State Arsenal and Armory	State Arsenal and Armory	April 4, 1996 (#96000357)	360 Broad Street; 41°45′54″N 72°41′10″W	Downtown	
126	Stone Bridge	Stone Bridge	March 28, 1985 (#85000793)	500 Main Street; 41°45′44″N 72°40′28″W	Downtown	
127	Harriet Beecher Stowe House	Harriet Beecher Stowe House	October 6, 1970 (#70000710)	73 Forest Street; 41°45′54″N 72°42′01″W	Asylum Hill	
128	M. Swift and Sons Company	M. Swift and Sons Company	July 24, 2013 (#13000527)	10 & 60 Love Lane; 41°47′31″N 72°40′52″W	North End	
129	Temple Beth Israel	Temple Beth Israel	December 1, 1978 (#78002868)	21 Charter Oak Avenue; 41°45′33″N 72°40′29″W	Sheldon-Charter Oak	
130	Trinity College Long Walk Historic District	Trinity College Long Walk Historic District	April 12, 2024 (#100010225)	300 Summit Street; 41°44′54″N 72°41′34″W		
131	Mark Twain House	Mark Twain House	October 15, 1966 (#66000884)	351 Farmington Avenue; 41°46′02″N 72°42′07″W	Asylum Hill	Home of Mark Twain from 1871 to 1891.
132	U.S. Post Office and Federal Building	U.S. Post Office and Federal Building	October 19, 1981 (#81000623)	135–149 High Street; 41°46′11″N 72°40′50″W	Downtown	1931 combination of post office, courthouse and federal office building
133	Underwood Computing Machine Company Factory	Underwood Computing Machine Company Factory	November 12, 2010 (#10000895)	56 Arbor Street; 41°45′34″N 72°42′13″W	Parkville	
134	Union Baptist Church	Union Baptist Church	August 15, 1979 (#79002634)	1913 and 1921 Main Street; 41°46′52″N 72°40′37″W	Clay-Arsenal	
135	Upper Albany Historic District	Upper Albany Historic District	September 29, 1986 (#86003383)	Roughly bounded by Holcomb Street, Vine Street, Homestead Avenue, and Woodland and Ridgefield Streets; 41°47′09″N 72°41′26″W	Upper Albany	
136	Vine Street Apartment Buildings	Vine Street Apartment Buildings	February 14, 2012 (#12000002)	4–48 Vine Street; 41°46′48″N 72°41′17″W	Upper Albany	
137	Wadsworth Atheneum	Wadsworth Atheneum	October 6, 1970 (#70000709)	25 Atheneum Square; 41°45′48″N 72°40′26″W	Downtown	
138	Washington Street School	Washington Street School	February 19, 1982 (#82004431)	461 Washington Street; 41°44′50″N 72°41′05″W	Barry Square	
139	Watkinson Juvenile Asylum and Farm School	Watkinson Juvenile Asylum and Farm School	March 23, 1995 (#95000273)	140, 180, and 190 Bloomfield Avenue; 41°47′24″N 72°42′45″W	Blue Hills	Extends into West Hartford, elsewhere in Hartford County
140	Webster Memorial Building	Webster Memorial Building	April 12, 1982 (#82004433)	36 Trumbull Street; 41°45′55″N 72°40′35″W	Downtown	
141	West Boulevard Historic District	West Boulevard Historic District	March 22, 2007 (#06000615)	Roughly along Rodney Street and West Boulevard; 41°45′41″N 72°42′38″W	West End	
142	West End North Historic District	West End North Historic District	July 25, 1985 (#85001618)	Roughly bounded by Farmington Avenue, Lorraine, Elizabeth, and Highland Streets; 41°46′09″N 72°42′44″W	West End	Extends into West Hartford, elsewhere in Hartford County
143	West End South Historic District	West End South Historic District	April 11, 1985 (#85000763)	Roughly bounded by Farmington Avenue, Whitney and South Whitney Streets, West Boulevard, and Prospect Avenue; 41°45′47″N 72°42′52″W	West End	Extends into West Hartford, elsewhere in Hartford County
144	Wethersfield Avenue Car Barn	Wethersfield Avenue Car Barn	November 28, 1983 (#83003569)	331 Wethersfield Avenue; 41°44′48″N 72°40′29″W	Barry Square	
145	Widows' Home	Widows' Home	March 10, 1983 (#83001267)	1846–1860 North Main Street; 41°46′49″N 72°40′34″W	Clay-Arsenal	
146	Windsor Avenue Congregational Church	Windsor Avenue Congregational Church	April 3, 1993 (#93000174)	2030 Main Street; 41°46′56″N 72°40′33″W	Clay-Arsenal	

== Former listings ==
	Name on the Register	Image	Date listed	Date removed	Location	Description
1	Capitol Building	Capitol Building	December 23, 1984 (#84000761)	December 21, 1989	402–418 Asylum Street; 41°46′04″N 72°40′51″W	Removed due to owner objection. Now a contributing portion of the High Street Historic District.

== See also ==
- List of National Historic Landmarks in Connecticut
- National Register of Historic Places listings in Connecticut
