= Washington Street School (Hartford, Connecticut) =

- U.S. National Register of Historic Places
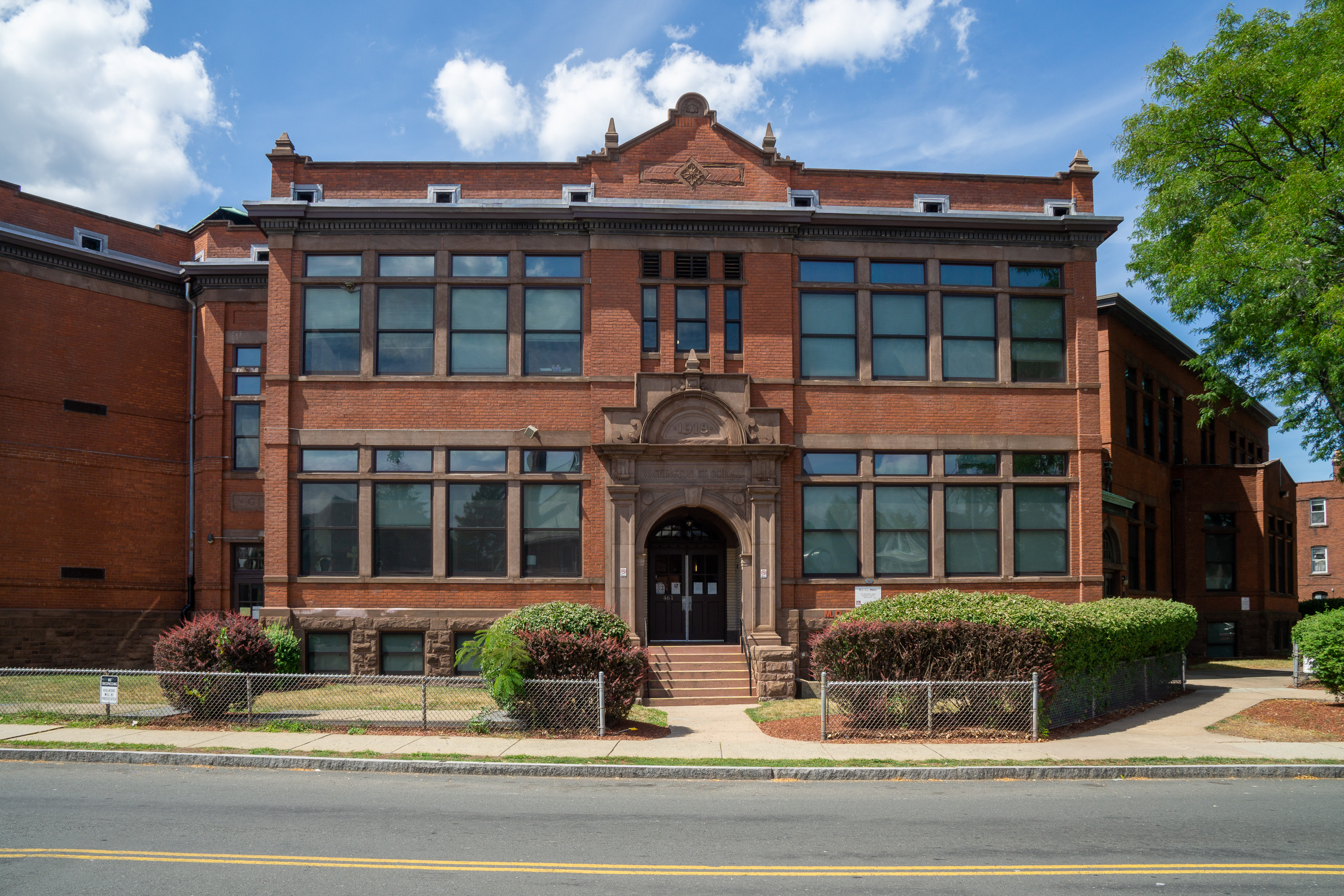

- Location within Connecticut Location within the United States
- Location: 461 Washington Street, Hartford, Connecticut
- Area: 2.5 acres (1.0 ha)
- Built: 1874
- Architectural style: Renaissance, Romanesque
- NRHP reference No.: 82004431
- Added to NRHP: February 19, 1982

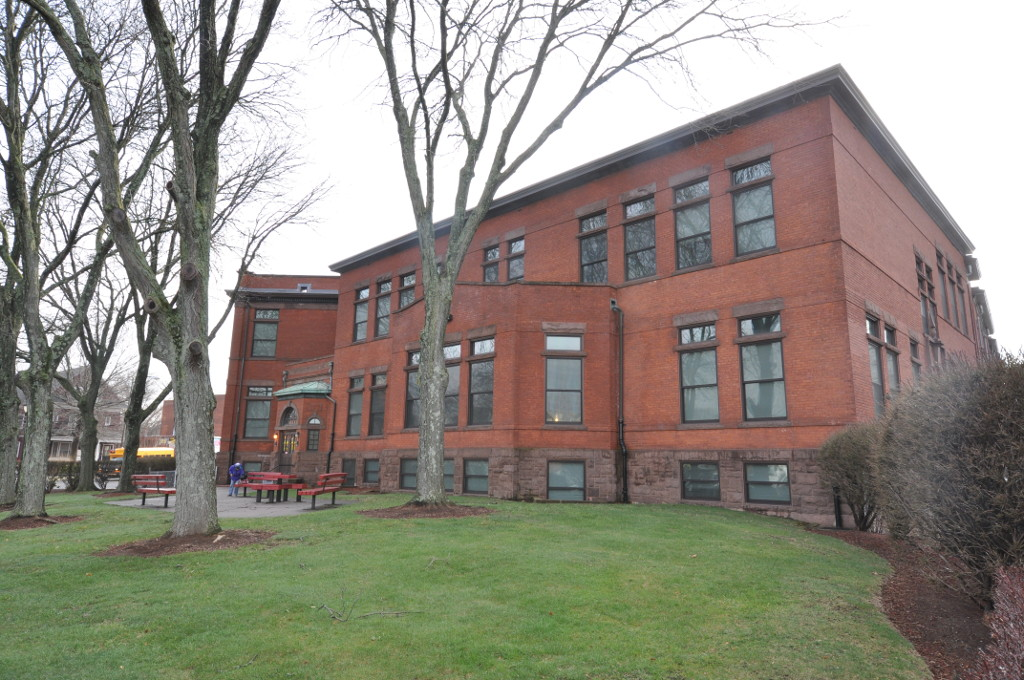
Washington Street facade

The Washington Street School is a historic school building at 461 Washington Street in Hartford, Connecticut. Built in stages between 1874 and 1929, it is a good example of Romanesque architecture, and is reflective of the rapid growth on Hartford's south side. It was listed on the National Register of Historic Places in 1982. It has been converted into senior housing.

== Description and history ==
The Washington Street School is located in south Hartford's Barry Square neighborhood, occupying a roughly rectangular parcel bounded on the north by School Street, the east by Washington Street, and the south by New Britain Avenue. It consists of a series of brick and brownstone buildings, all two stories in height, connected in a rough U shape, with the legs of the U extending parallel to School Street. The main facade faces New Britain Avenue, which extends south westerly from Washington Street at an angle. Although they were built over a long period of time, the various sections of the building have a relatively unified Romanesque appearance, with arched brownstone entrances and occasional round-arch windows.

The first school to stand on this site was built in 1842, when a one-room schoolhouse was built here. By the 1860s it was significantly overcrowded, but a new school was not built until 1874. A portion of this building is contained within the surviving structure. It was repeatedly enlarged, in 1890, 1895, 1899, 1906, 1917, and 1929. During this entire period, the school remained a district school, and was taken over by city administration when all schools were finally consolidated in 1934. In 1958 it was formally named the Michael D. Fox Elementary School, after a long-time principal and administrator. It had been vacated by the time of its listing on the National Register in 1982, and has since been converted into senior housing.

== See also ==
- National Register of Historic Places listings in Hartford, Connecticut
