= Allen Place–Lincoln Street Historic District =

Historic district in Connecticut, United States

- Allen Place-Lincoln Street Historic District
- U.S. National Register of Historic Places
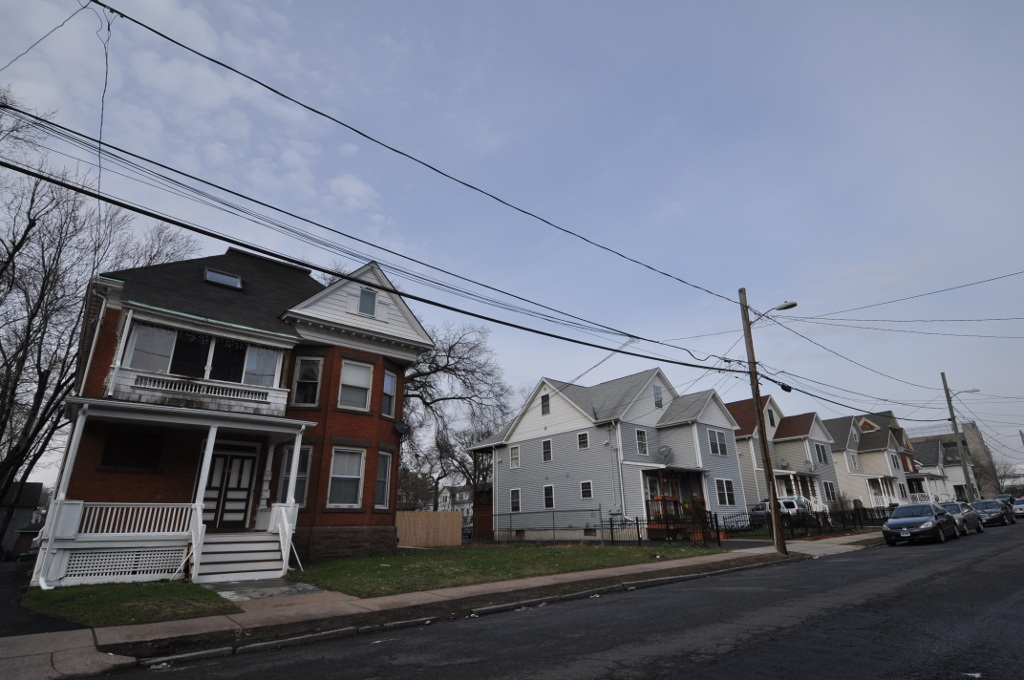

- Location within Connecticut Location within the United States
- Location: Roughly bounded by Madison Street, Washington Street, Vernon Street, and Zion Hill Cemetery, Hartford, Connecticut
- Coordinates: 41°45′11″N 72°41′8″W
- Area: 23 acres (9.3 ha)
- NRHP reference No.: 03000815
- Added to NRHP: August 28, 2003

The Allen Place–Lincoln Street Historic District encompasses a small neighborhood of late 19th-century housing built for white-collar service workers in southern Hartford, Connecticut. It is roughly bounded by Madison, Washington, and Vernon Streets, and Zion Hill Cemetery, and has well-preserved examples of vernacular Queen Anne and Colonial Revival architecture. It was listed on the National Register of Historic Places in 2003.

== Description and history ==
Until the mid-19th century, the Frog Hollow area on the south side of Hartford was predominantly farmland, with some country estate houses on Washington Street, a main north–south road. By 1880, Broad Street paralleled Washington to the west, and the area between Madison and Vernon Streets had a few houses west of Washington. The area was significantly developed in the 1890s, and was essentially built out after a second major round of building in the 1910s. The houses built here were generally first occupied by lower-class white collar workers in Hartford's industries, commercial establishments, and the increasingly important insurance industry.

The historic district consists of all of the houses facing Allen Place and Lincoln Street, between Washington Street and Affleck Street, and continuing about 1/2 block further west on Allen Place. A few houses are included that face Affleck and Broad Streets, the two north–south cross streets in the district. Most of the houses are 1-1/2 to 3 stories in height, and house between one and three units. Most are of wood-frame construction, although there are a few instances of brick construction. There are several places where virtually identical houses were built side-by-side, an act of economy by the builders. Most of the housing has elements of either Queen Anne or Colonial Revival styling (or some combination), although early examples have some Italianate features.

== See also ==
- National Register of Historic Places listings in Hartford, Connecticut
