= Pope Park (Hartford, Connecticut) =

Public park in Hartford, Connecticut

Coordinates: 41°45′20″N 72°41′50″W

Pope Park

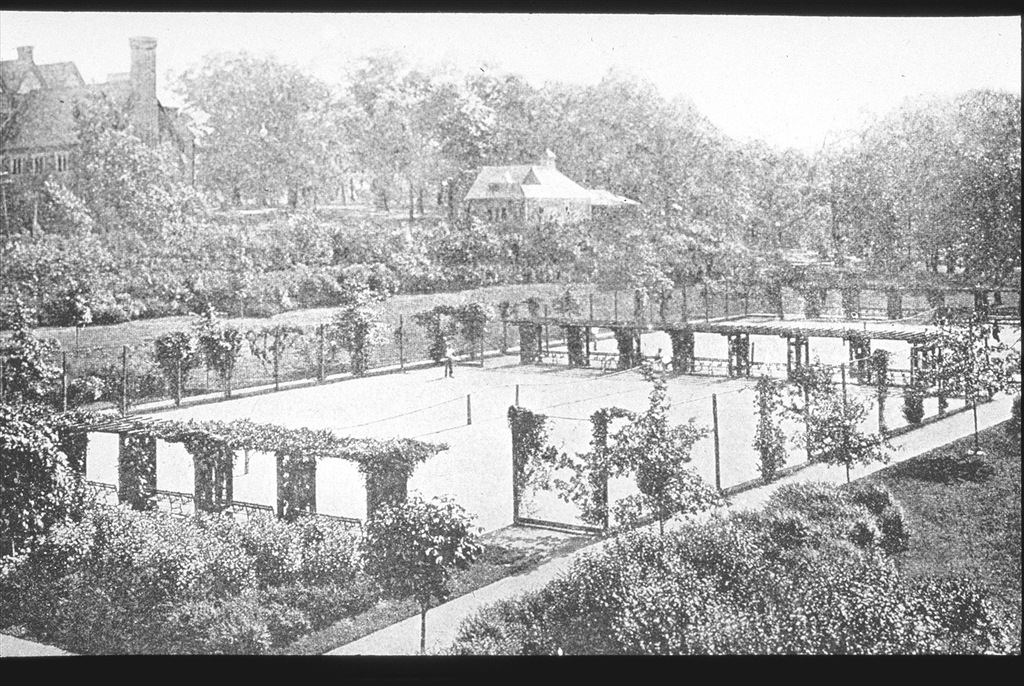
Tennis courts in Pope Park, circa 1893

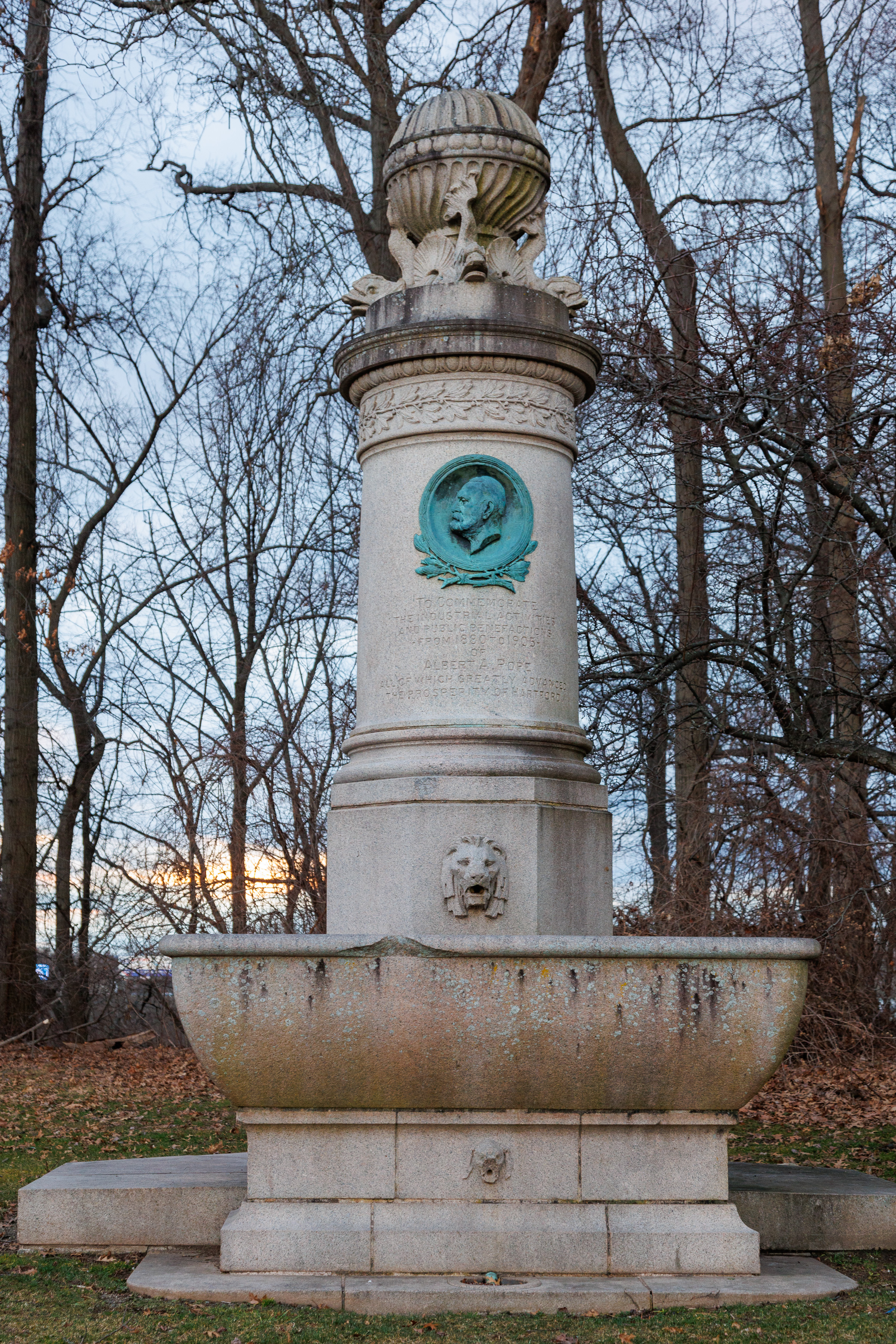
Albert Pope Memorial fountain

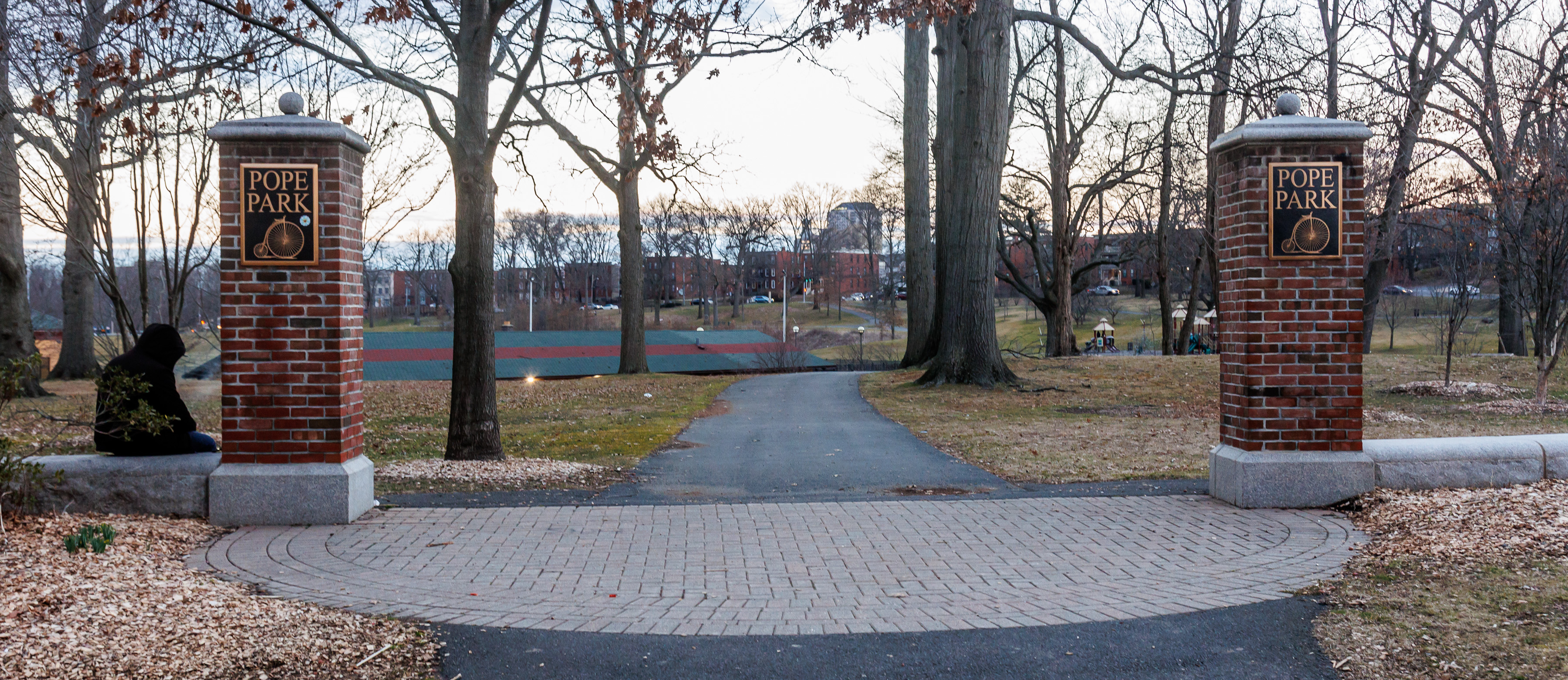
Hillside Avenue entrance

Pope Park is a public park in Hartford, Connecticut.

== Description and history ==
Land for the park was donated to the city in 1895 by Colonel Albert Augustus Pope for use by his employees and city residents. Pope was the founder of Pope Manufacturing Company, which built automobiles and bicycles, including the Columbia bicycle. The park was landscaped by the Olmsted Brothers design firm starting in 1898.

The Olmsted Brothers completed the park in 1903, which was the year of Frederick Law Olmsted's death; his son and nephew completed the work. Originally the park's western boundary was defined by the Park River, which was straightened and diverted underground beneath the park in the 1940s. The park consisted of 90.5 acres (36.6 ha) laid out in three sections:

- Hollowmead, the park's southern section, was the largest, consisting of 73 acres.
- Bankside Grove, north of Park Street, consisted of 13 acres laid out along the Park River.
- The smallest section was 4 acres, separated from Bankside Grove by Park Terrace.

The Olmsteds conceived Pope Park as part of a system of seven parks to be built as a ring around the perimeter of Hartford. Other parks in this system included Goodwin Park, Keney Park, Riverside Park, and Colt Park.

Interstate 84 was built through Pope Park in 1969, cutting off Pope Park West from the Lower Mead.

In 2002, a new Master Plan was commissioned by the Friends of Pope Park; most of this work was completed by 2009. Pope Park Drive, which had bisected the Hollowmead, was removed, and paths were resurfaced and redesigned.

In 2016, Pope Park was to undergo a major cleanup to remove litter, waste and overgrown vegetation.
