= Mansuy and Smith Automobile Showroom Building =

- U.S. National Register of Historic Places
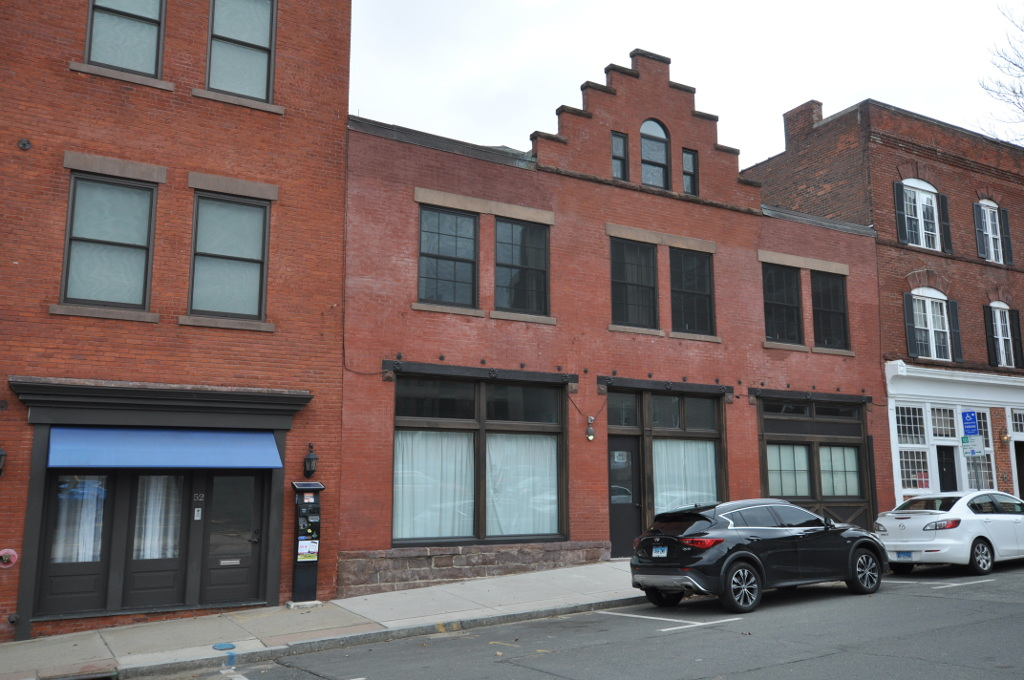

- Location within Connecticut Location within the United States
- Location: 38-42 Elm Street, Hartford, Connecticut
- Coordinates: 41°45′44″N 72°40′31″W
- Area: less than one acre
- Built: c. 1900
- Architectural style: Queen Anne
- NRHP reference No.: 16000867
- Added to NRHP: December 20, 2016

The Mansuy and Smith Automobile Showroom Building is a historic commercial building at 38-42 Elm Street in Hartford, Connecticut. Built about 1900, it is an early example of an automobile showroom, used by a local carriage manufacturer seeking to transition to the new technology. It was listed on the National Register of Historic Places in 2016.

== Description and history ==
The Mansuy and Smith Automobile Showroom Building is located on the North Side of Elm Street, in a block of commercial buildings between Pulaski Circle and Main Street on the west side of downtown Hartford. It is a two-story brick building, joined via party walls to adjacent buildings. Its main facade is divided into three sections: on the ground floor, the right section has a garage bay opening, the left section has a large display window, and the center section has a window and pedestrian entrance. On the second floor, each section has two sash windows with cast stone sills and lintels. A stepped parapet rises above the center section.

The history of Mansuy and Smith begins in 1841, when Louis Mansuy began building carriages, and was by the third quarter of the 19th century one of Connecticut's most successful carriage makers. The company first produced a phaeton in 1896 for the Pope Manufacturing Company as a body for an electric car. Mansuy's grandson, also named Louis, partnered in the early 20th century with Thomas Hammond Smith, an early car dealer to engage in the construction and sale of automobiles, and was engaged in the painting of automobiles on these premises as early as 1902. The business venture eventually failed in 1913. The present building appears to be a surviving remnant of a larger manufacturing premises, but with specific alterations to present the merchandise in a more attractive setting.

== See also ==
- National Register of Historic Places listings in Hartford, Connecticut
