= Pope-Robinson =

Defunct American Automobile manufacturer

Robinson Motor Vehicle Company Pope-Robinson Company
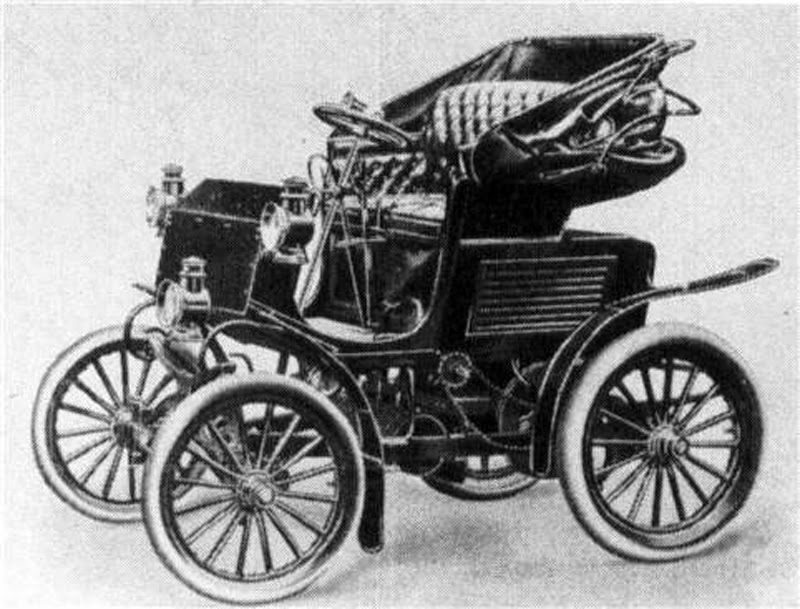
- 1900 Robinson runabout
- Founded: 1900, 1902; 124 years ago
- Founder: John T. Robinson
- Defunct: 1904; 122 years ago
- Fate: Sold to Buick
- Headquarters: Hyde Park, Massachusetts, United States
- Key people: John T. Robinson, Edward W. Pope
- Products: Automobiles
- Production output: 59 (1902-1904)

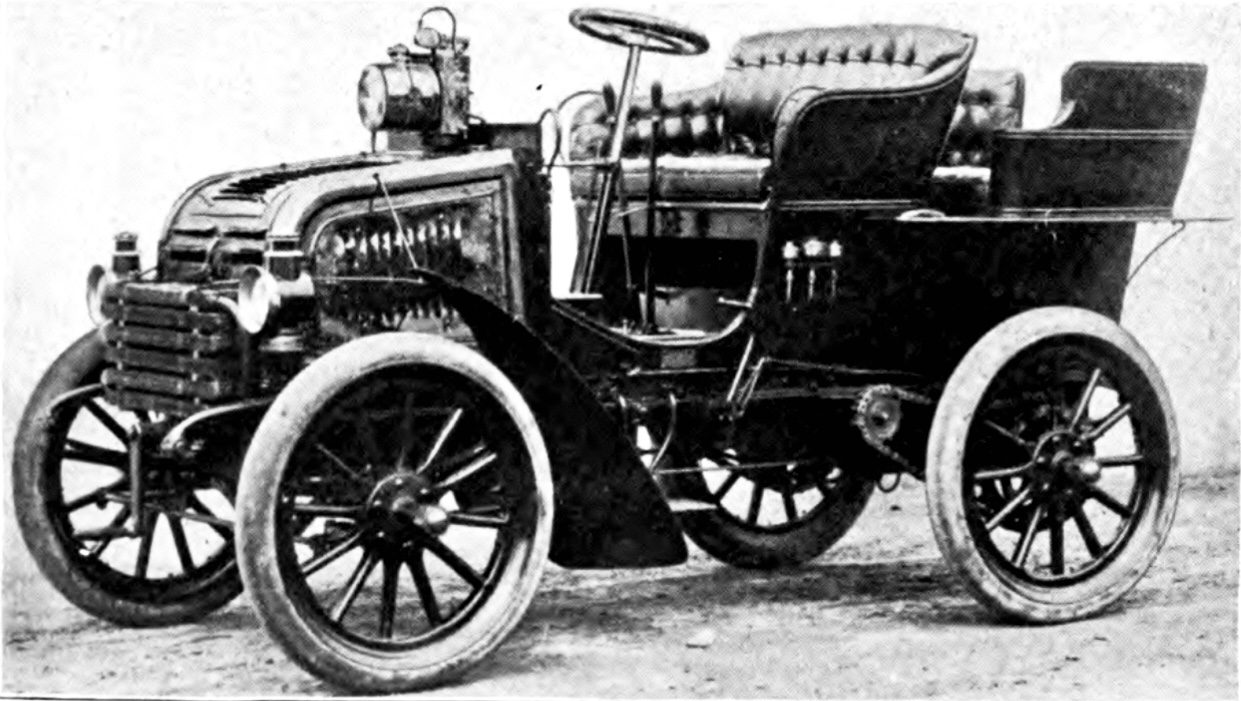
1901 Robinson Touring Car 4942 cc ; 101,6 mm Bore; 152,4 mm Stroke

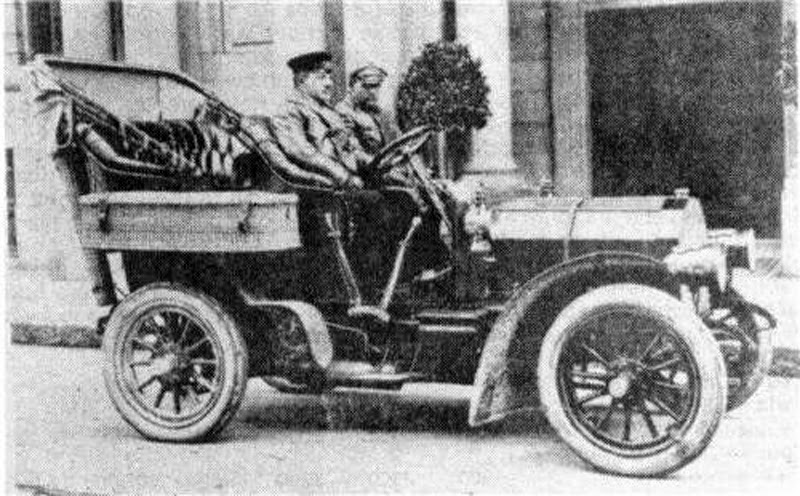
1904 Pope-Robinson Touring Car

The Robinson and later Pope-Robinson was part of the Pope automobile group of companies founded by Colonel Albert Pope manufacturing Veteran and Brass Era automobiles in Hyde Park, Massachusetts.

== History ==
The company could trace its roots back to Bramwell-Robinson who started as paper box machinery makers going on to make some single-cylinder 3-wheeled cars between 1899 and 1901. The two founders split up in 1900 to each make their own models under their own names, the Bramwell, which continued until 1904 and the Robinson which originally appeared in 1900. The Robinsons were originally made by John T. Robinson and Company becoming the Robinson Motor Vehicle Company in 1902 before joining the Pope group later that year.

A new factory was constructed in 1902 and the Robinson automobile became the Pope-Robinson for 1903. John T. Robinson died in 1904 and late in the year Buick Motor Company bought the company in order to secure Pope-Robinson's A.L.A.M. license.

The 1903-1904 Pope-Robinson was a luxury touring car model. Equipped with a tonneau, it could seat 5 passengers and sold for $4,500, equivalent to $161,250 in 2025. The vertically mounted water-cooled straight-4, situated at the front of the car, produced 24 hp (17.9 kW). A 3-speed sliding transmission was fitted. The channel steel-framed car weighed 2,600 lb (1179 kg). This advanced model, based on the Système Panhard used a modern cellular radiator and competed with the top-line European vehicles.
