= Pope-Hartford =

Defunct American motor vehicle manufacturer

Pope-Hartford Pope Manufacturing Company
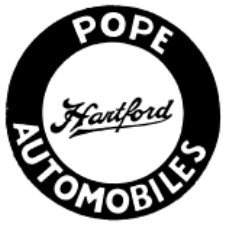
- Founded: 1904; 122 years ago
- Founder: Albert A. Pope
- Defunct: 1914; 112 years ago
- Fate: Bankruptcy
- Headquarters: Hartford, Connecticut, United States
- Products: Automobiles
- Production output: 4,732 (1904-1914)

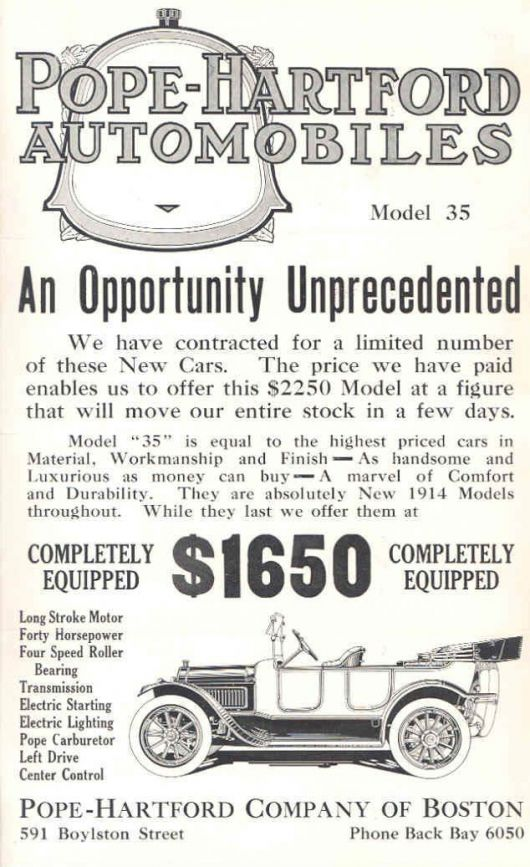
1914 advertisement for Pope-Hartford automobiles

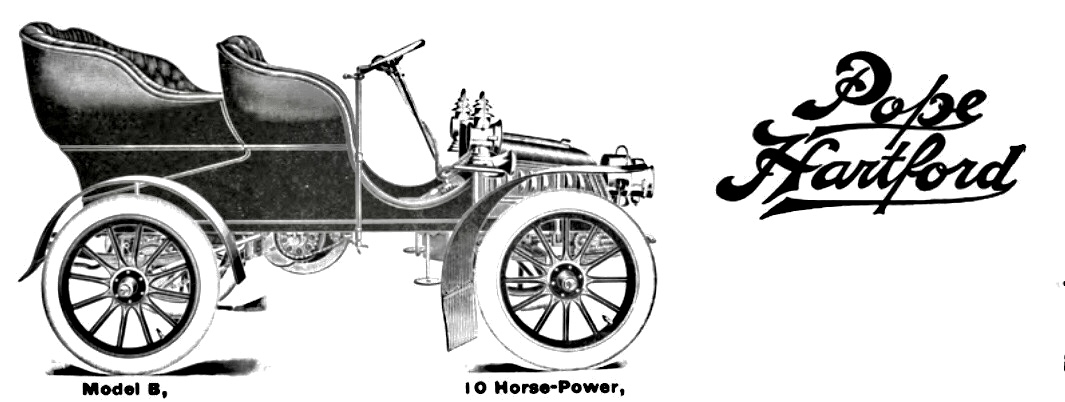
Pope-Hartford Model B (1904-1905)

The Pope-Hartford was one of the automobile marques of the Pope Manufacturing Company founded by Colonel Albert A. Pope, and was a manufacturer of Brass Era automobiles in Hartford between 1904 and 1914.

== History ==
Introduced on the market for 1904, the first Pope-Hartford was a single-cylinder runabout. A twin-cylinder followed in 1905, and a four-cylinder in 1906 A six-cylinder Pope-Hartford did not arrive until 1911.

A 1910 Pope-Hartford Forty won the free-for-all race in November of 1909 celebrating the 300th anniversary of the discovery of San Francisco Bay by Don Gaspar de Portola, and for 1911 Pope-Hartford made available a chain-drive Fiat chassis fitted with a Pope engine and marketed as the Fiat-Portola.

On August 10, 1909, Colonel Albert A. Pope died and his brother George took over. By 1914, Pope-Hartford production continued under receivership. Pope Manufacturing Company had been selling-off its property and the Pope-Hartford plant was sold in 1915.

== Production models ==
- Pope-Hartford Model 4
- Pope-Hartford Model D
- Pope-Hartford Model F
- Pope-Hartford Model G
- Pope-Hartford Model V
- Pope-Hartford Model L
- Pope-Hartford Model M
- Pope-Hartford Model S
- Pope-Hartford Model T
- Pope-Hartford Model W

== Gallery ==
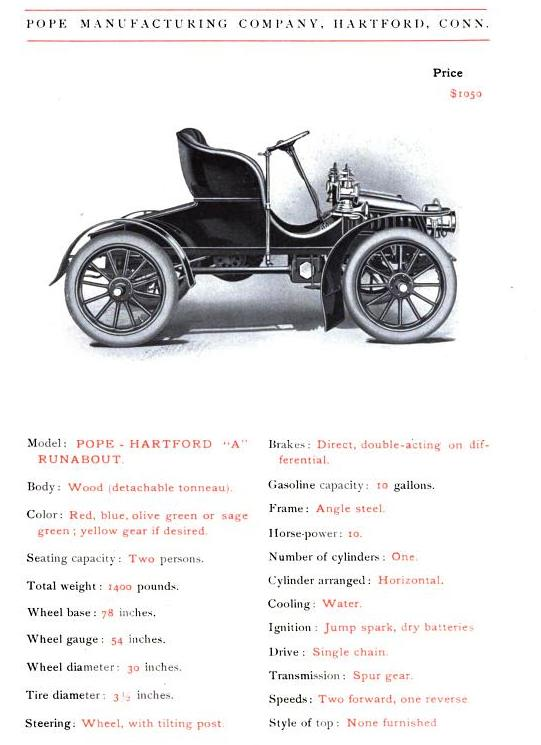
1904 Pope Hartford Model A

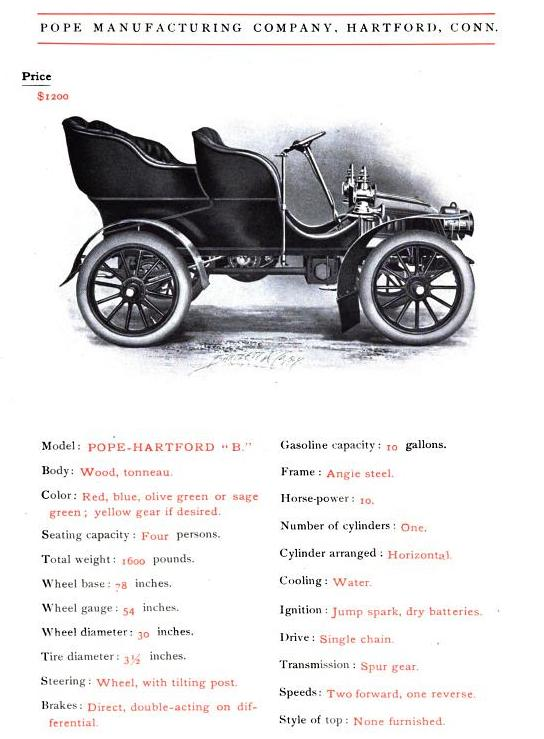
1904 Pope Hartford Model B

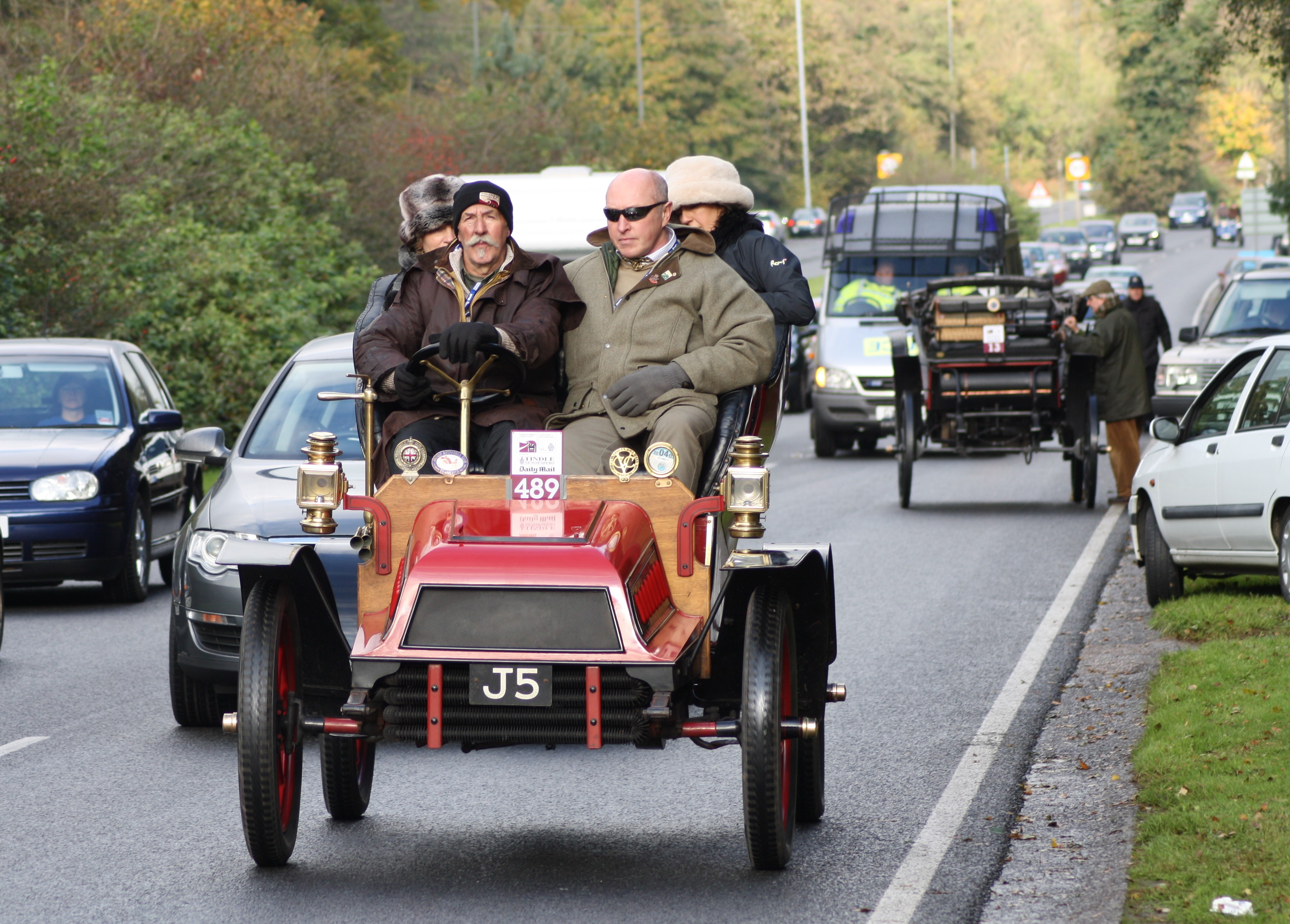
1904 Pope-Hartford Model B 10hp Tonneau

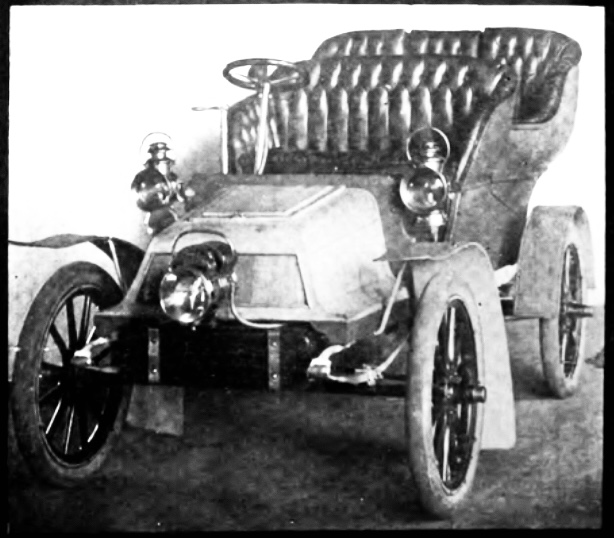
Pope-Hartford Model B Tonneau (1904-1905)

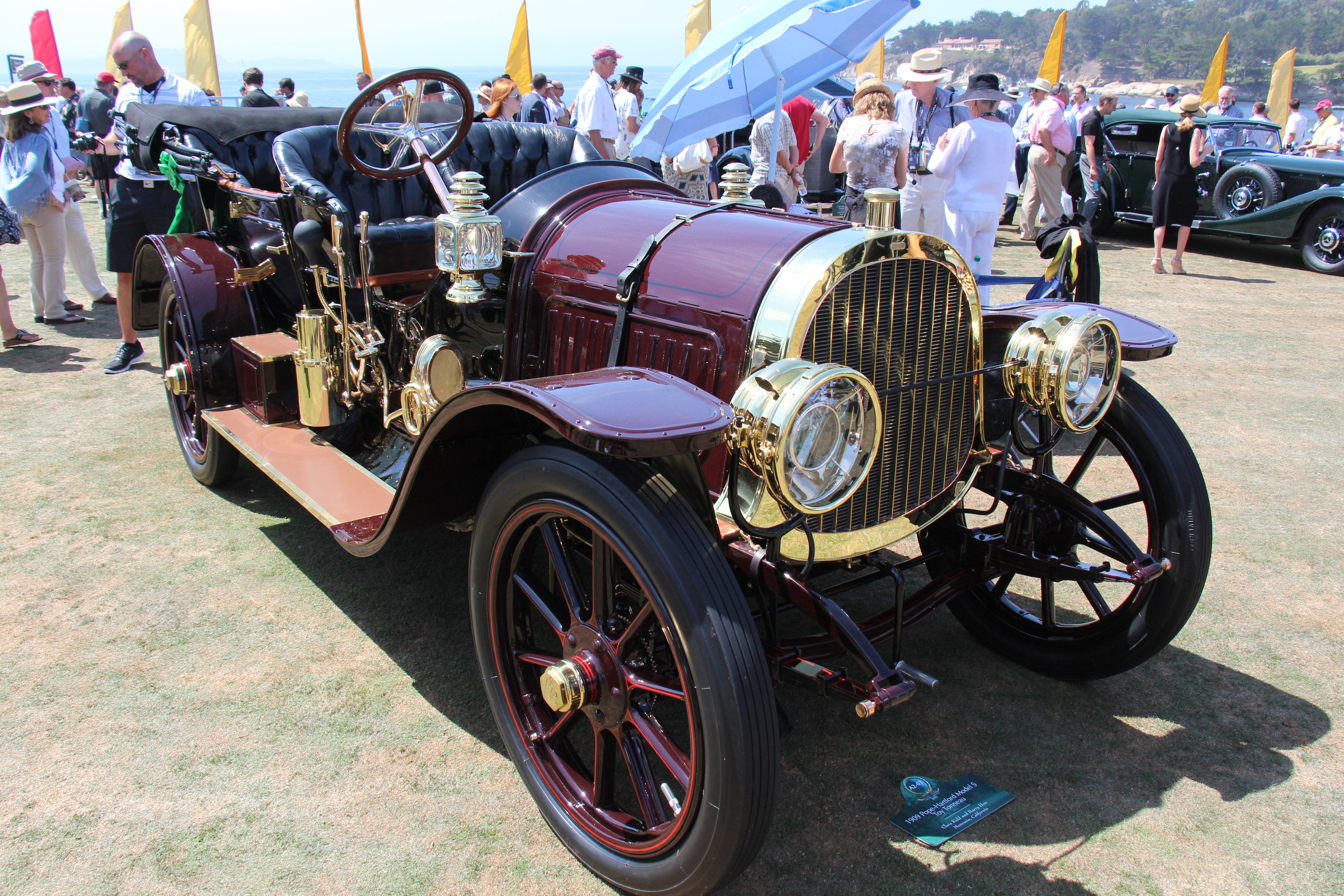
1909 Pope-Hartford Model S Toy-Tonneau

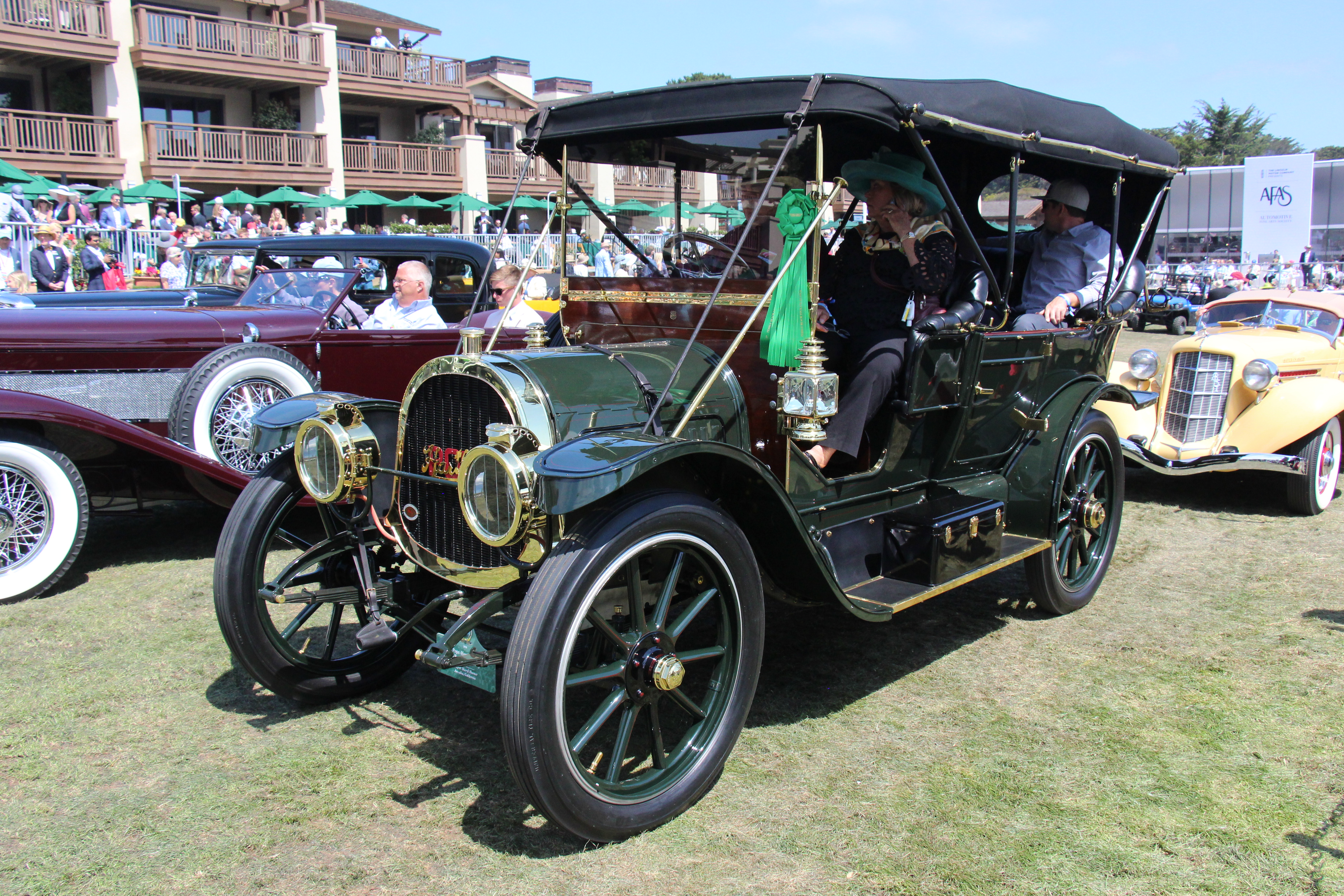
1910 Pope-Hartford Model T Tourer

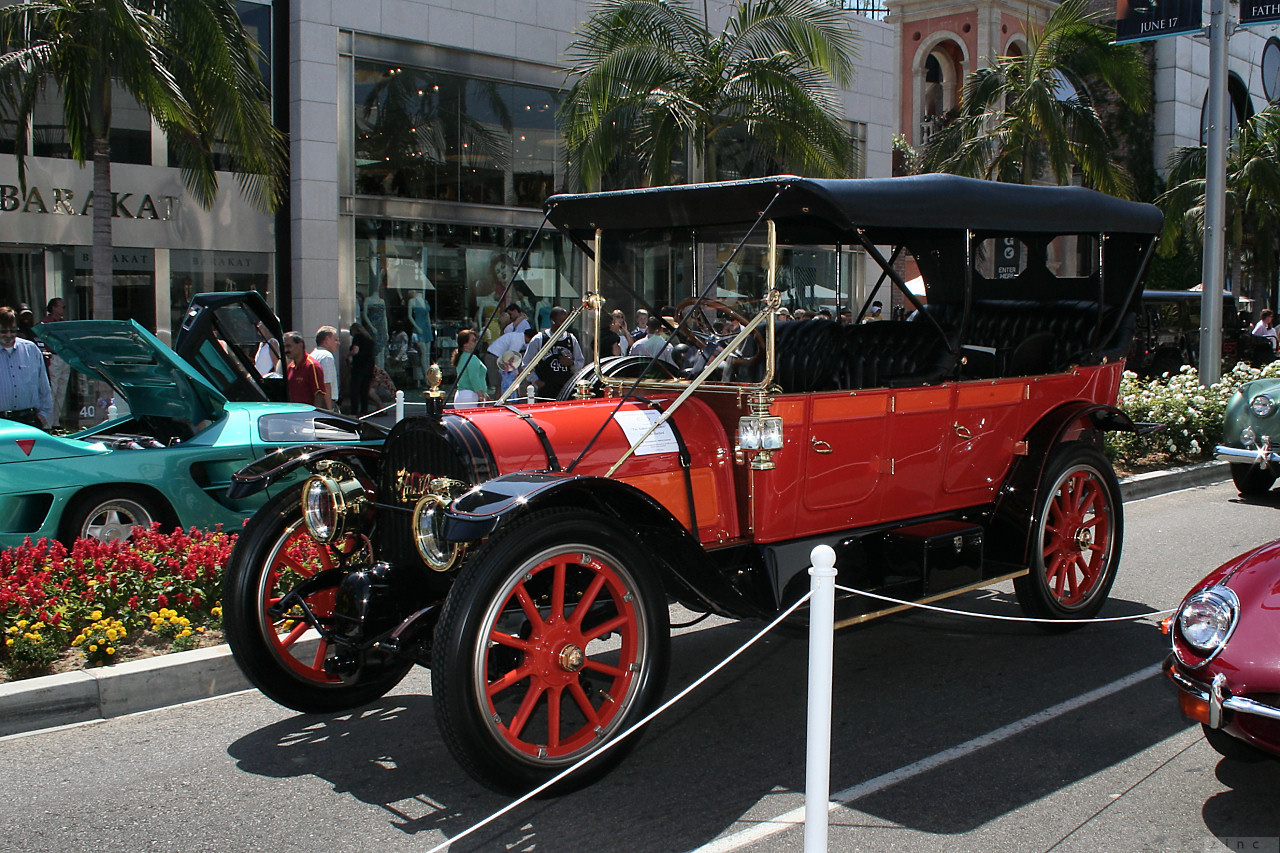
1911 Pope-Hartford Model W Touring

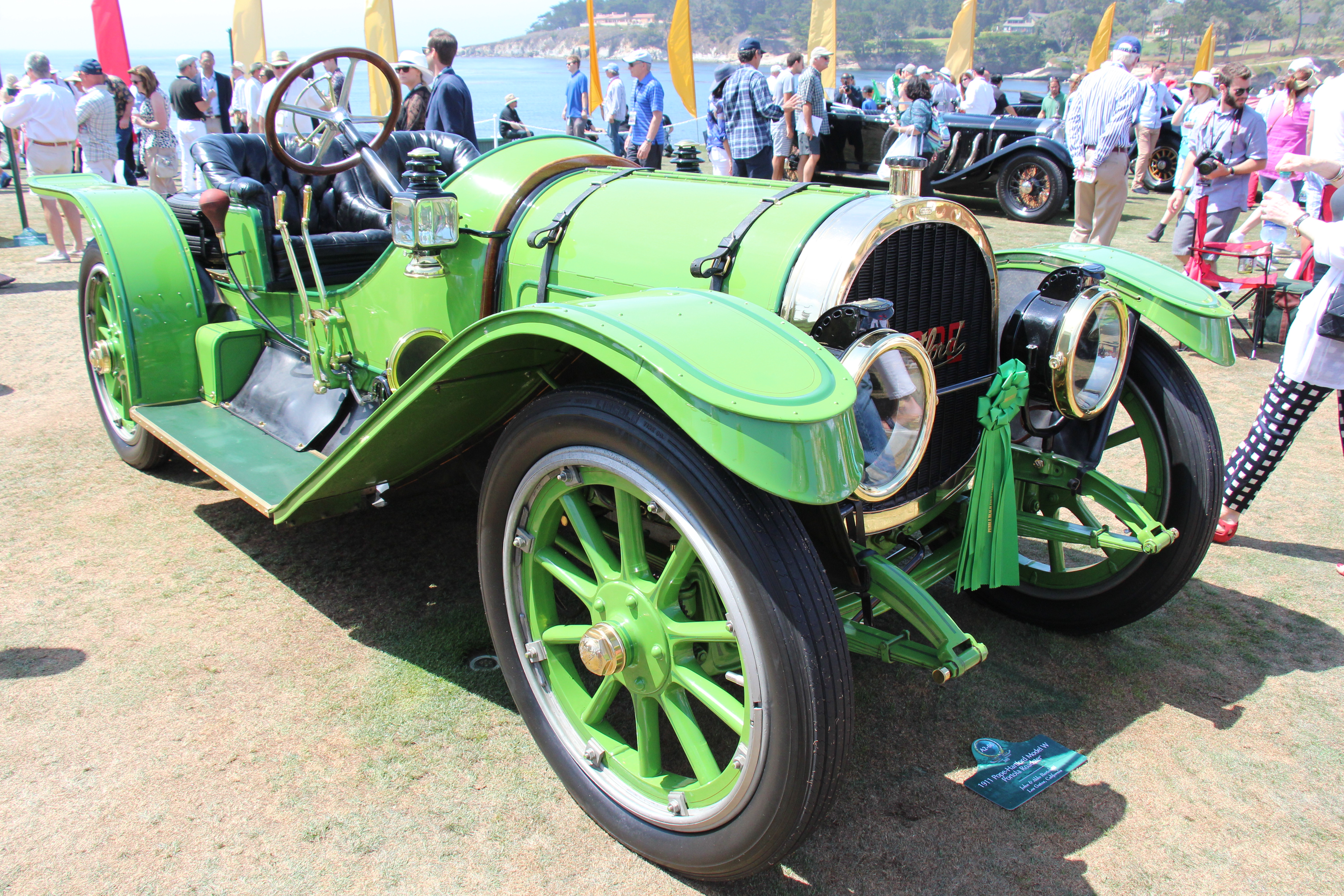
1911 Pope-Hartford Model W Portola Roadster

== See also ==
- Pope-Hartfords at ConceptCarz
