= Albert Augustus Pope =

American businessman (1843–1909)

Col. Albert A. Pope
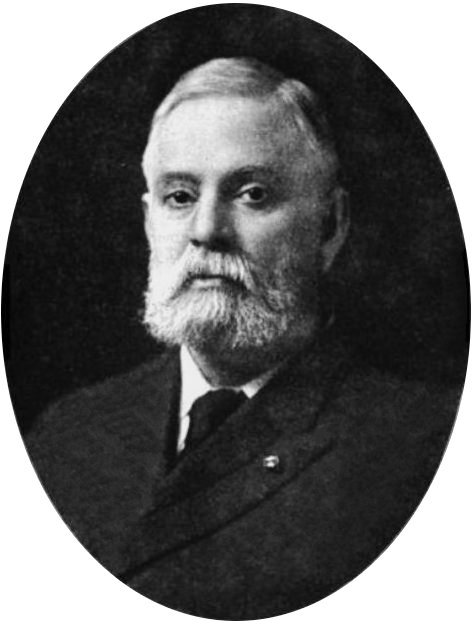
- Born: May 20, 1843; Boston, Massachusetts, US
- Died: August 10, 1909 (aged 66); Lindermere-by-the-Sea, Cohasset, Massachusetts, US
- Occupations: Importer, manufacturer
- Known for: Pope Manufacturing Company
- Title: Colonel
- Spouse: Abbie Linder

Signature
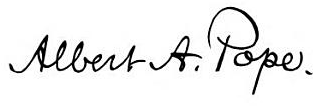

Albert Augustus Pope (May 20, 1843 – August 10, 1909) was an American businessman and Brevet Lieutenant-Colonel in the Union Army. He was an importer, promoter and manufacturer of bicycles, and a manufacturer of automobiles.

== Early life ==
Pope was born on May 20, 1843, in Boston, Massachusetts. His parents were Charles Pope and Elizabeth Bogman Pope. His father descended from a line of New Englanders in the timber and lumber business since the 1660s, but Charles opted for speculating in real estate. His maternal grandfather, Captain James Bogman, disappeared at sea after sailing out of Norfolk, Virginia, when Elizabeth was a youth. Albert was one of eight children.

Around 1845, Charles Pope initiated his independence from the family business when he purchased his first lot in Brookline, Massachusetts, a nearby suburb of Boston. In 1846, he moved the family from Milton, Massachusetts, to a large house on Harvard Street in Brookline. He borrowed against his older landholdings to accumulate more lots at Harvard Place, and on Summer, Vernon, and Washington Streets. As these lots gained convenient streetcar access, or were even rumored to be so, he sold his Brookline properties at a hefty profit. He continued to accumulate property through 1850, but starting in 1851, the financial leverage caught up to him, and sales of his land holdings only paid his creditors.

William Pope, a brother of Charles, moved to Brookline prior to 1850, bringing some of Albert's cousins into the neighborhood. Albert attended Brookline Grammar School with his cousin George, who was just a year younger than Albert.

Charles Pope never recovered from his business downfall, according to the family story. Albert was already the breadwinner at age nine: first plowing fields, then selling produce, and at the age of fifteen, working the Quincy Market. A few years later he worked as a store clerk for $4 per week. Yet an Albert Pope biographer writes, "a study of his life suggests that his well-connected wider family helped him to get ahead and that his leaving school had less to do with providing for his needy family than with perceiving he could go, further, faster on his own." Another historian argues that Charles Pope invested with Albert in Boston real estate and was an original investor in Pope Manufacturing Company.

== American Civil War ==
On August 27, 1862, at the age of nineteen, Albert Pope joined the Union Army attached to the 35th Massachusetts Volunteer Regiment, commissioned as a Second Lieutenant. The unit crossed the Potomac River on September 7, and just ten days later, fought at Antietam. The 35th Massachusetts confronted a Confederate crossfire and was stranded behind enemy lines with its ammunition exhausted before answering an order to retreat. Seventy-nine men from Pope's unit died that day. Pope survived a bout with cholera, and his unit served at the Battles of Fredericksburg, Vicksburg, and Knoxville. He mustered out as a captain, though he received the honorary title of Brevet Lieutenant-Colonel for distinguished service. A Brevet title did not carry with it added authority or added pay.

== Life after the war ==
Albert used $900 in savings from his military salary to invest in a shoemakers' supply business at Dock Square in Boston. After just a year, this investment had returned $9,600, worth more than $100,000 in 2000 U.S. dollars. Though Albert left school at an early age, he supported the college education of three of his siblings: his twin sisters Emily and Augusta, and his youngest brother, Louis. Emily and Augusta Pope would later become physicians, and Louis would graduate from seminary and become a minister. His eldest brother, a widower named Charles, died in 1868. Albert adopted his seven-year-old nephew, Harry Melville Pope. Later, Emily and Augusta would both graduate from medical school, complete post-doctoral studies in Europe, and practice at the New England Hospital for Women and Children (known today as the Dimock Center). In 1886, they were both admitted into the Massachusetts Medical Society.

He married September 20, 1871, Abbie Linder, daughter of George Linder and Matilda Smallwood, of Newton, Massachusetts, and they had four sons and one daughter. At the time of his marriage, Pope was still supporting his youngest brother Louis. Abbie bore two children during the first few years of their marriage, Albert Linder Pope in 1872 and Margaret Roberts Pope in 1874. He was also successful in expanding his business interests to air pistols, cigarette rollers, and shoe findings.

== The bicycle years ==
=== Imports and the first Columbias ===
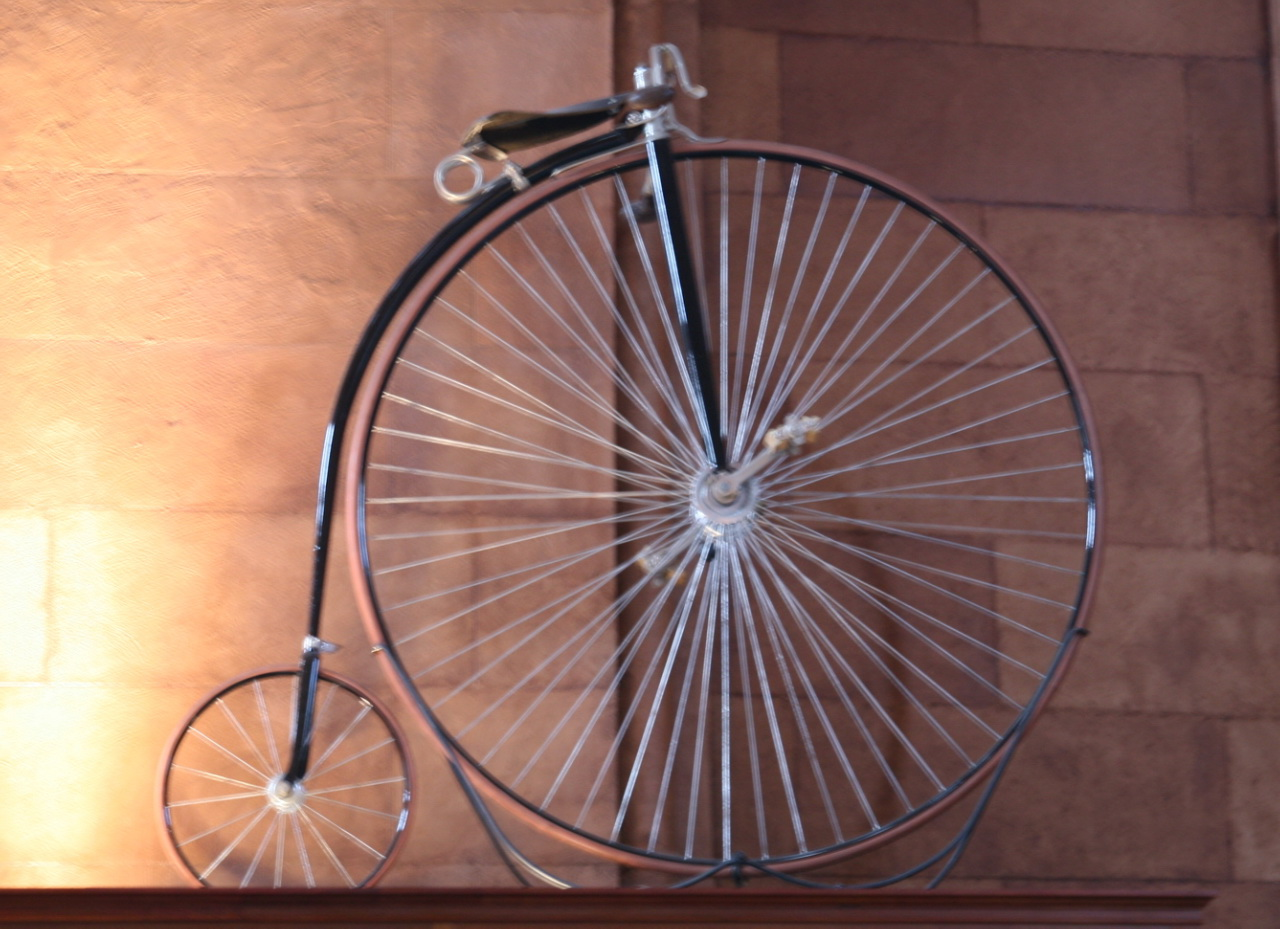
Columbia "Ordinary"

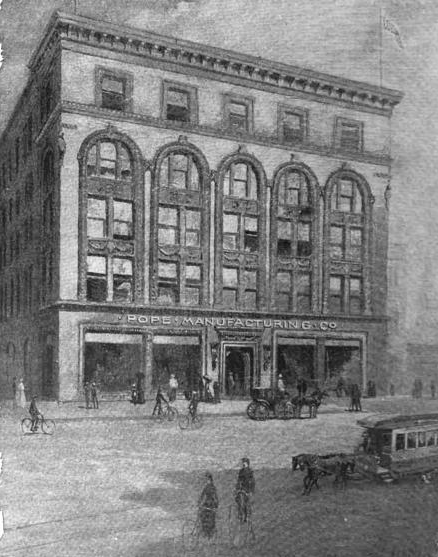
Pope Manufacturing in Boston

Pope was elected to Newton Common Council in 1875. The following summer, he attended the Philadelphia Centennial Exhibition in his capacity as Newton Alderman, where he saw a display of English ordinary bicycles. Some Baltimore-based importers sponsored the bicycle exhibit. The English manufacturer Haynes & Jefferies was building and exporting copies of the Ariel model with the permission of James Starley and William Hillman. The Ariel-design featured a system of spokes that allowed larger wheels, and to prove the point, an ordinary with an 84-inch front wheel was on display.

In 1877, English bicycle-manufacturer John Harrington visited Pope during an extended stay in the United States. He hired a machinist to build a bicycle, completed in August 1877 at a cost of $313. Harrington used this machine to teach Pope how to ride. Pope made arrangements to import eight model Excelsior Duplexes from Bayliss, Thomas and Company of Coventry, England. He accepted delivery in January 1878, and placed an advertisement for his imported bicycles in Bicycling World magazine a few months later.

Pope had already invested over $4,000 importing about fifty bicycles through the first part of 1878. In May, he started inquiring about manufacturing his own machine. He met with George Fairfield, president of Weed Sewing Machine Company in Hartford. Pope stowed his Excelsior Duplex in the baggage hold of a New Haven Railroad train bound for Hartford, then rode from the Hartford station to the meeting at the Weed factory. Pope proposed to Fairfield that Weed produce fifty copies of this bicycle on a contract basis. Fairfield later accepted the offer. The Weed factory completed the order in September 1878, and these were the first bicycles Pope marketed under the Columbia brand. He managed his new bicycle business from his Pope Manufacturing Company office in Boston.

Pope sold a total of about ninety-two bicycles in 1878, combining imports and Columbias. In 1879, he sold about 1000 Columbias, the last year of the Excelsior Duplex copies. Demand for his bicycles exceeded his ability to produce them, so his advertisements stressed imports. Fairfield started tinkering with the design, improving the head and the front ball-bearing assembly resulting in the Special model. In 1880, a Special with a 48-inch wheel and full-nickel plating retailed at $132.50. The newly named Standard model also had design changes, but could be purchased without the ball bearings and nickel plating for $87.50.

=== Patent control ===
Two American firms formed a cartel around the United States patents of bicycles shortly after Pope entered the industry: Boston-based Richardson and McKee, and Montpelier Manufacturing of Vermont. Richardson and McKee owned the Pierre Lallement patent with six years remaining. Montpelier Manufacturing had gained shared control through legal threats and negotiation. The Vermont-based firm told Richardson and McKee that it was infringing on its rocking-horse patent. The two companies agreed to combine their patents and split a $10 or $15 royalty per bicycle that they would enforce against American producers. Pope managed to negotiate separately with the two companies and purchased controlling interest in the patent pool. He continued to invest in patents even remotely related to bicycle production. He filed lawsuits against rival bicycle marketers, then agreed to drop the suits in exchange for a $10 per unit royalty fee.

=== Promotion of bicycles and cycling ===
Pope spent no less than $8,000 on bicycle advocacy. As some local governments had introduced restrictions or bans on bicycle use, Pope treated this as a threat to his business. In response to an 1880 New York City ban against bicycle riding in Central Park, he staged a legal confrontation. Three cyclists rode into Central Park to defy the law with the knowledge that Pope would pay their legal fees. The cyclists, however, lost the cases and all the appeals, but Pope did provide the support he promised.

Pope, with his brother Arthur and his cousin Edward, were among the founders of the Massachusetts Bicycle Club.

Pope continued importing ordinaries from Europe and taking out US patents on these models. By the early 1890s, he had established a bicycle trust which controlled the central bicycle patents in the US. Nearly every US bicycle manufacturer paid Pope around $10 per bicycle. His bicycle brand was known as the Columbia. By the mid-1890s, at the height of the bicycle craze, Pope was manufacturing about a quarter million bicycles annually.

The major problem for bicycles at this time was the lack of suitable roads on which to ride them. Pope being not only a bicycle manufacturer but a bicycle-riding enthusiast, was particularly troubled by this problem. He formed the League of American Wheelmen and the Good Roads Movement to agitate for and petition governments for improved roads.

== Automobiles ==
=== Columbia Automobile Company ===
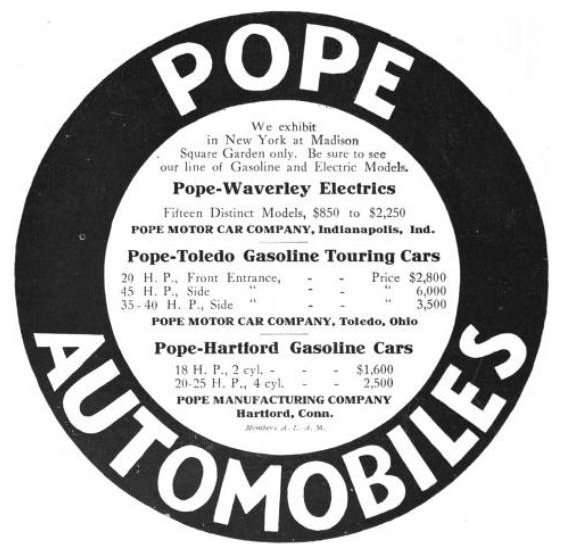
1905 Pope Manufacturing Co. advertisement

From 1896, he began to diversify into automobile production. The chief engineer of his Pope Motor Carriage department was Hiram Percy Maxim. In 1897, he renamed the Motor Carriage Department as the separate Columbia Automobile Company, which was spun off and sold to the Electric Vehicle Company, in which he was also an investor.

In 1897, Pope Manufacturing began production of an electric automobile in Hartford, Connecticut. By 1899, the company had produced over 500 vehicles. Hiram Percy Maxim was head engineer of the Motor Vehicle Department. The Electric Vehicle division was spun off that year as the independent company Columbia Automobile Company but it was acquired by the Electric Vehicle Company by the end of the year.

Pope tried to re-enter the automobile manufacturing market in 1901 by acquiring a number of small firms, but the process was expensive and competition in the industry was heating up.

Between the years 1903 and 1915, the company operated a number of automobile companies including Pope-Hartford (1903–1914), Pope-Robinson, Pope-Toledo (1903–1909), Pope-Tribune (1904–1907) and Pope-Waverly.

Pope declared bankruptcy in 1907. The Pope-Hartford and Pope-Waverley continued to be manufactured under different owners.

Pope is credited with being the first auto manufacturer to use mass production practices. In 1900 Pope's [Hartford] factories produced more motor vehicles than any other factory in the world.

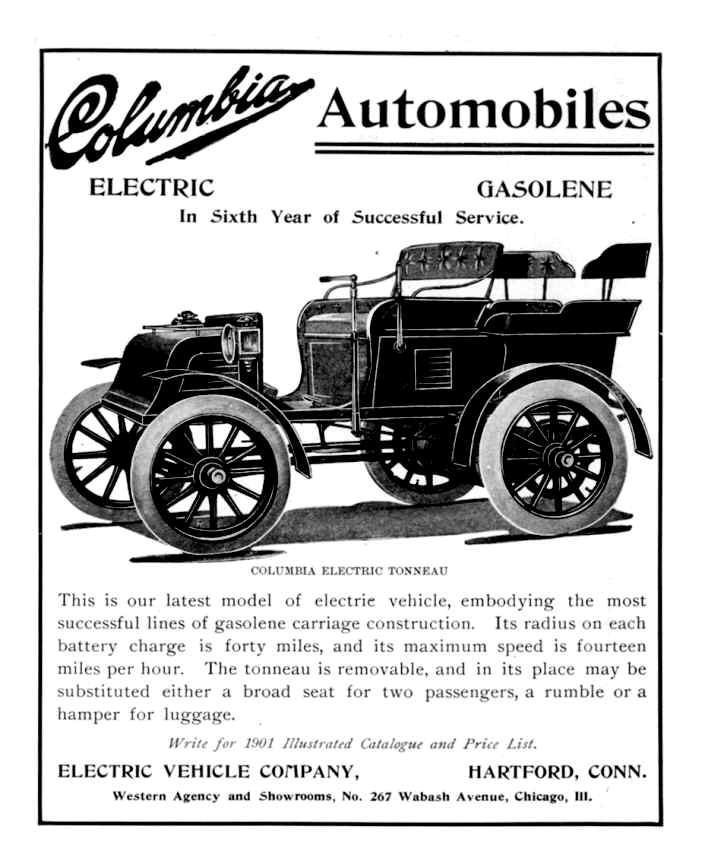
1901 Columbia Electric Advertisement

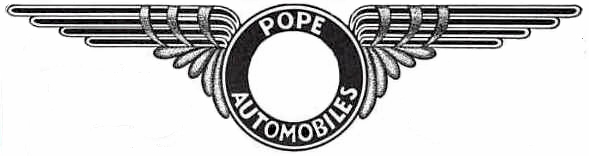
1903 Pope Automobile Company Logo

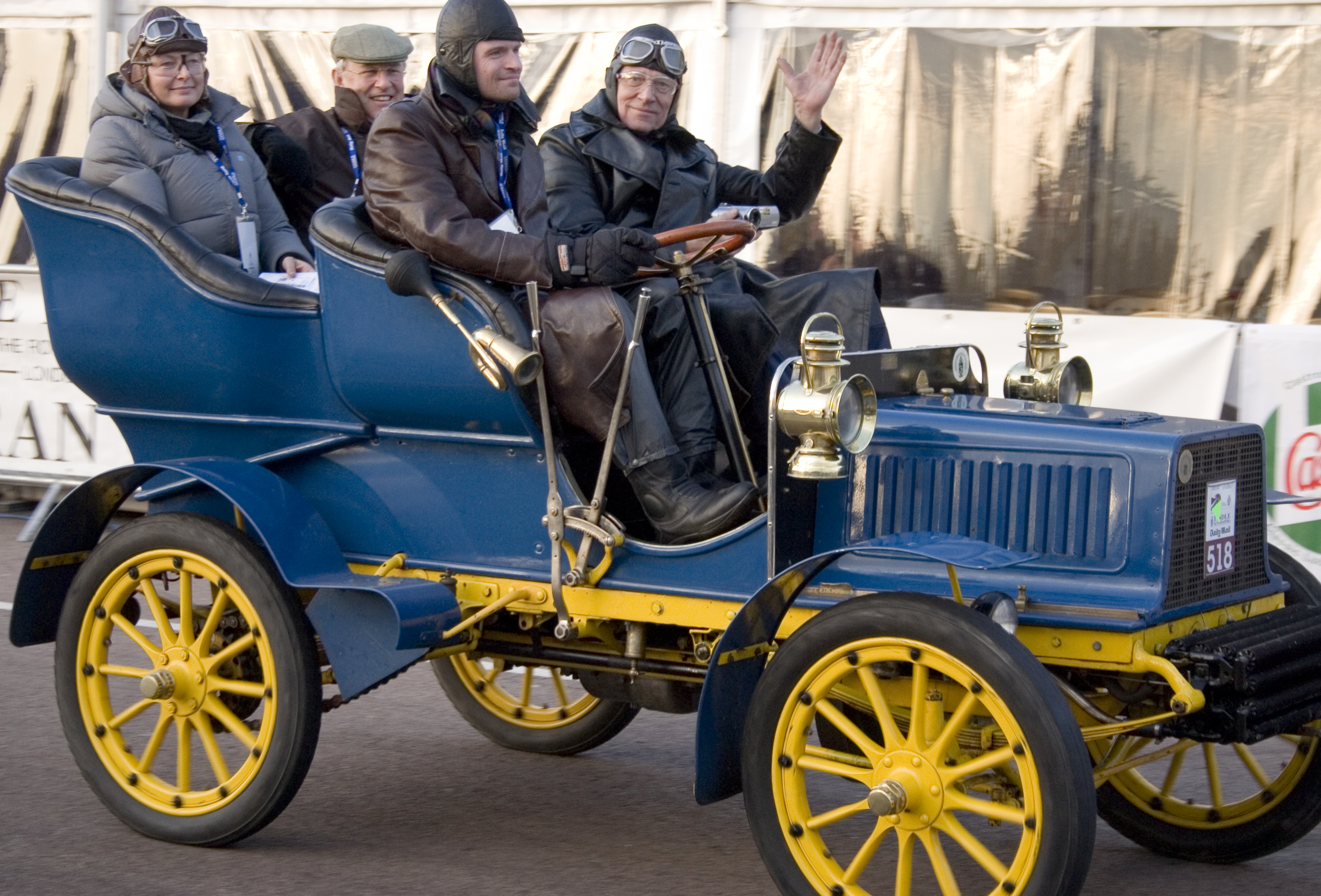
1904 Pope Toledo Tonneau

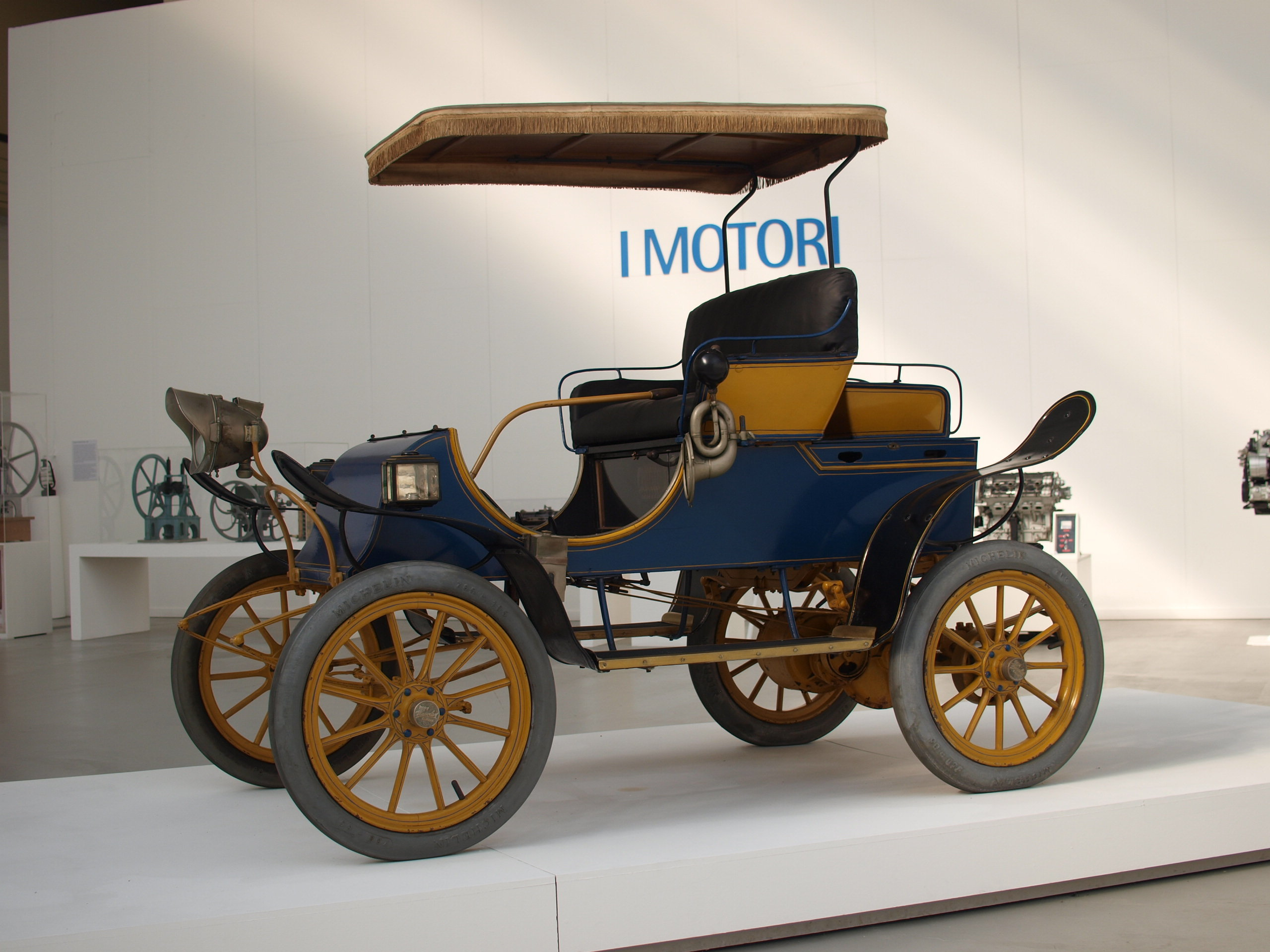
1907 Pope Toledo

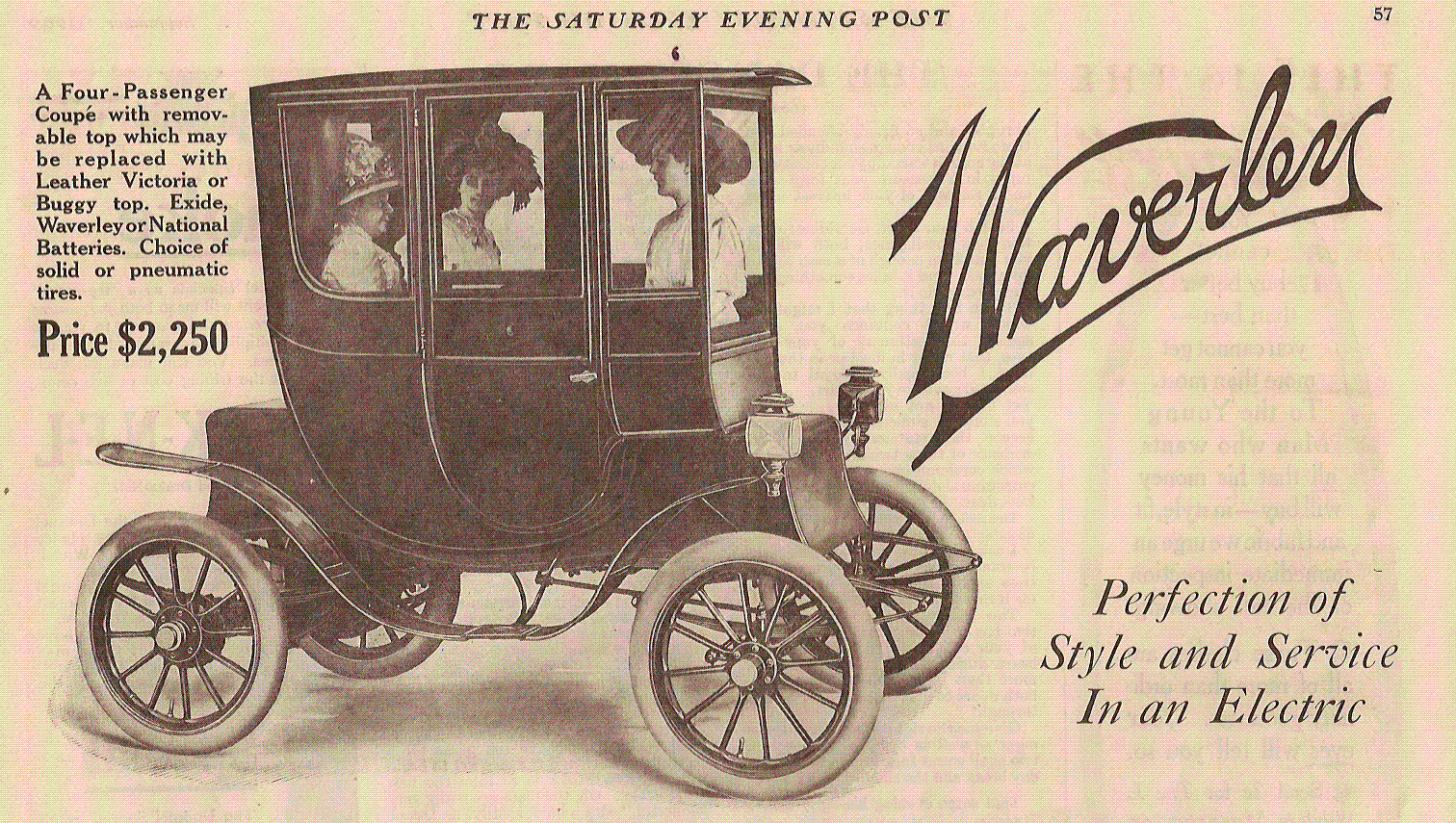
1910 Pope Waverley Coupe

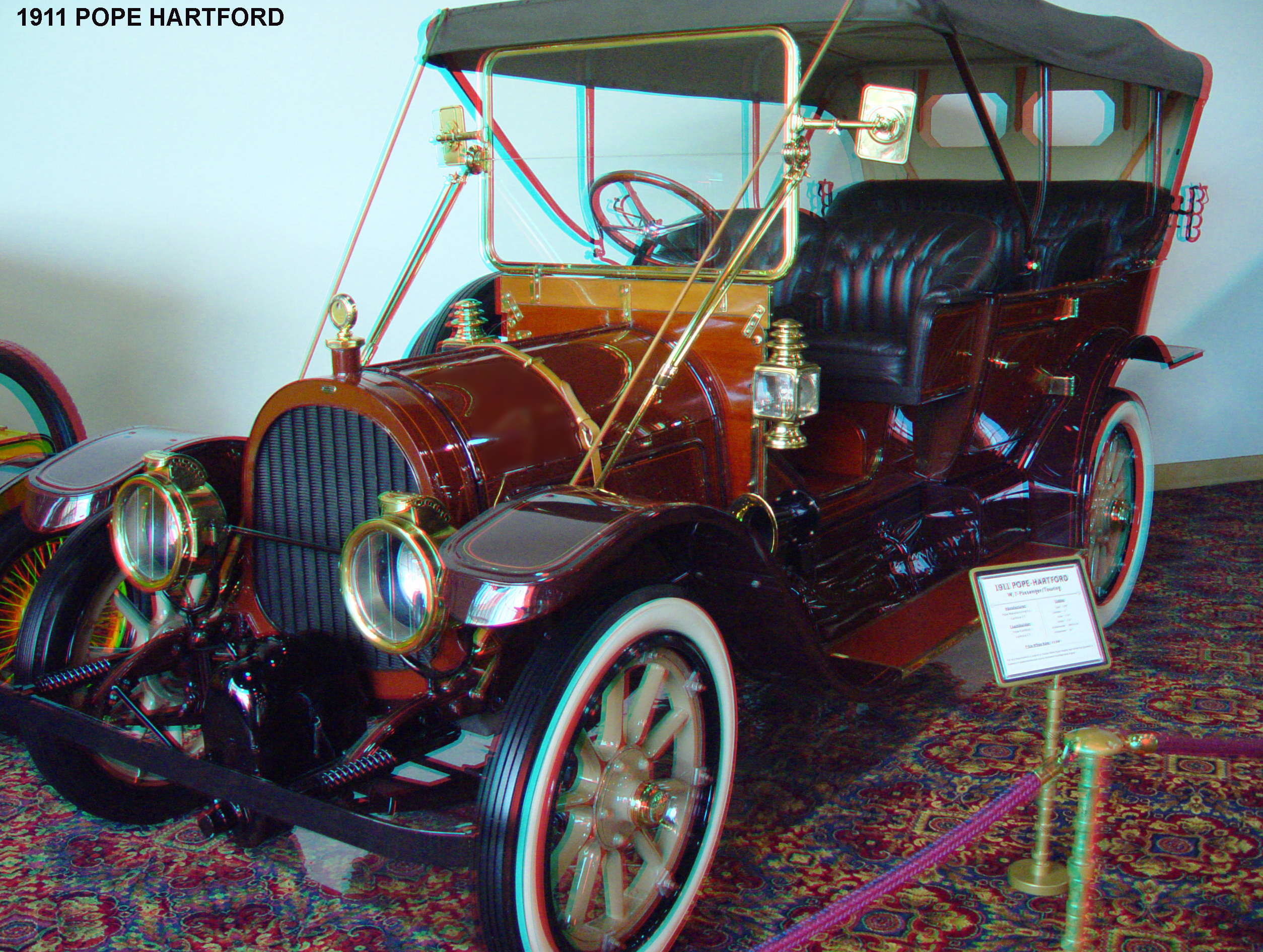
1911 Pope Hartford

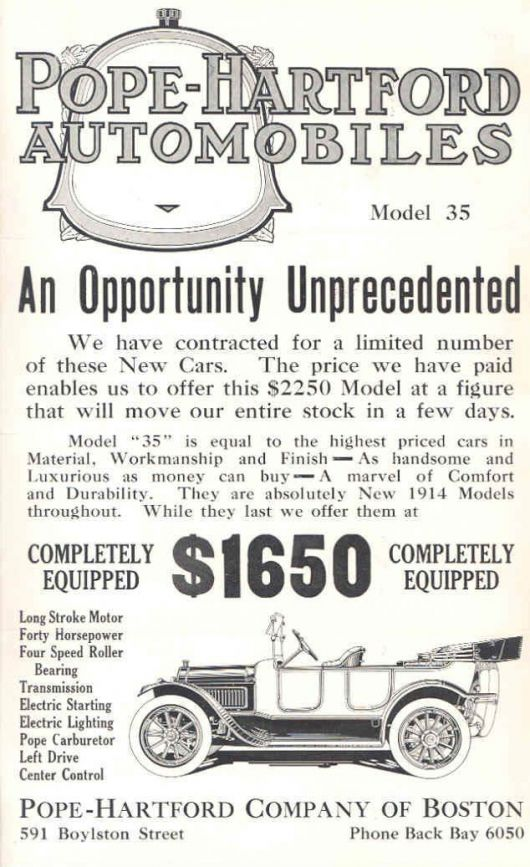
1914 Pope Hartford advertisement

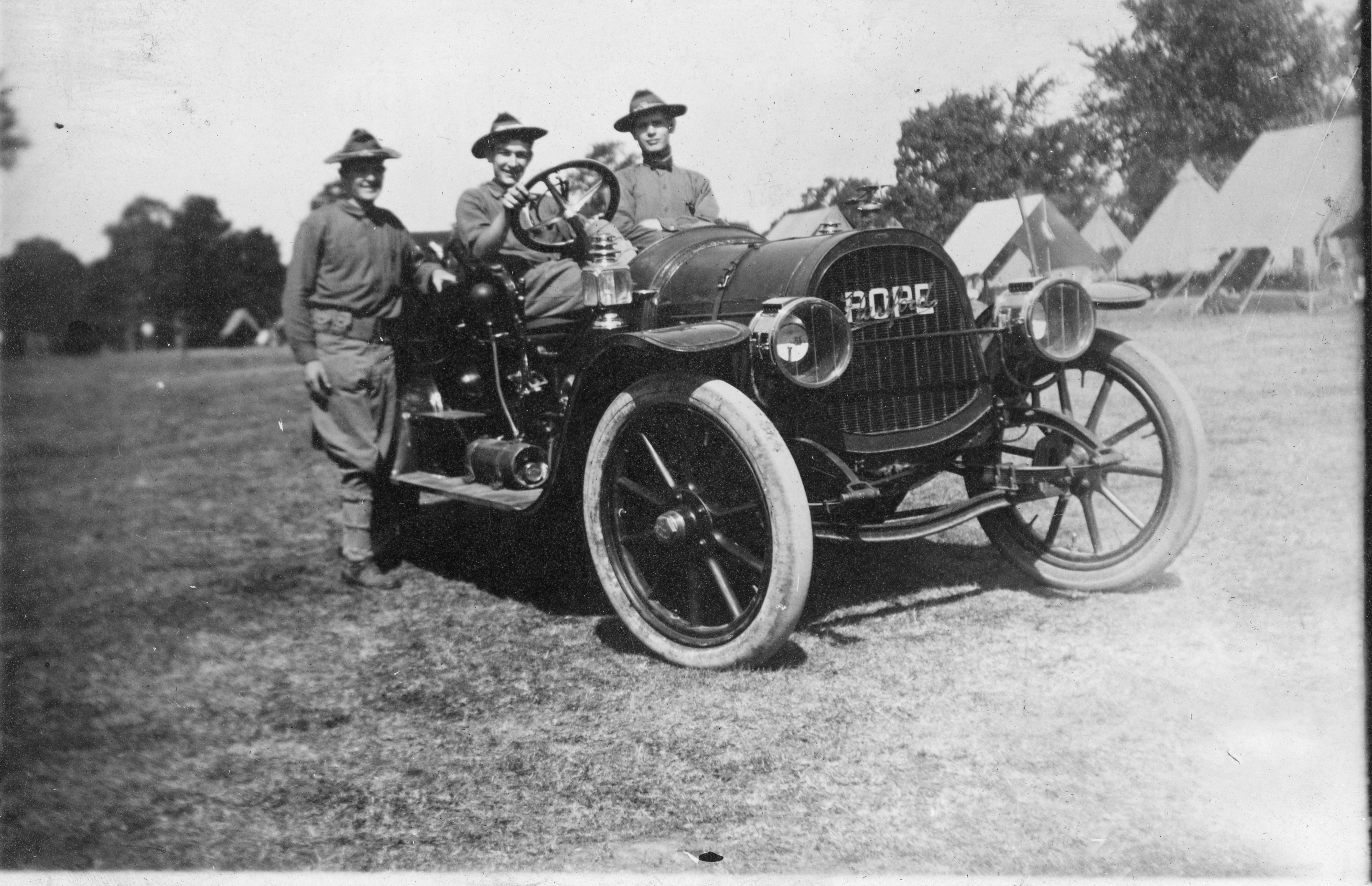
Pope Hartford with Soldiers

== Death ==
He died on August 10, 1909.

== Legacy ==
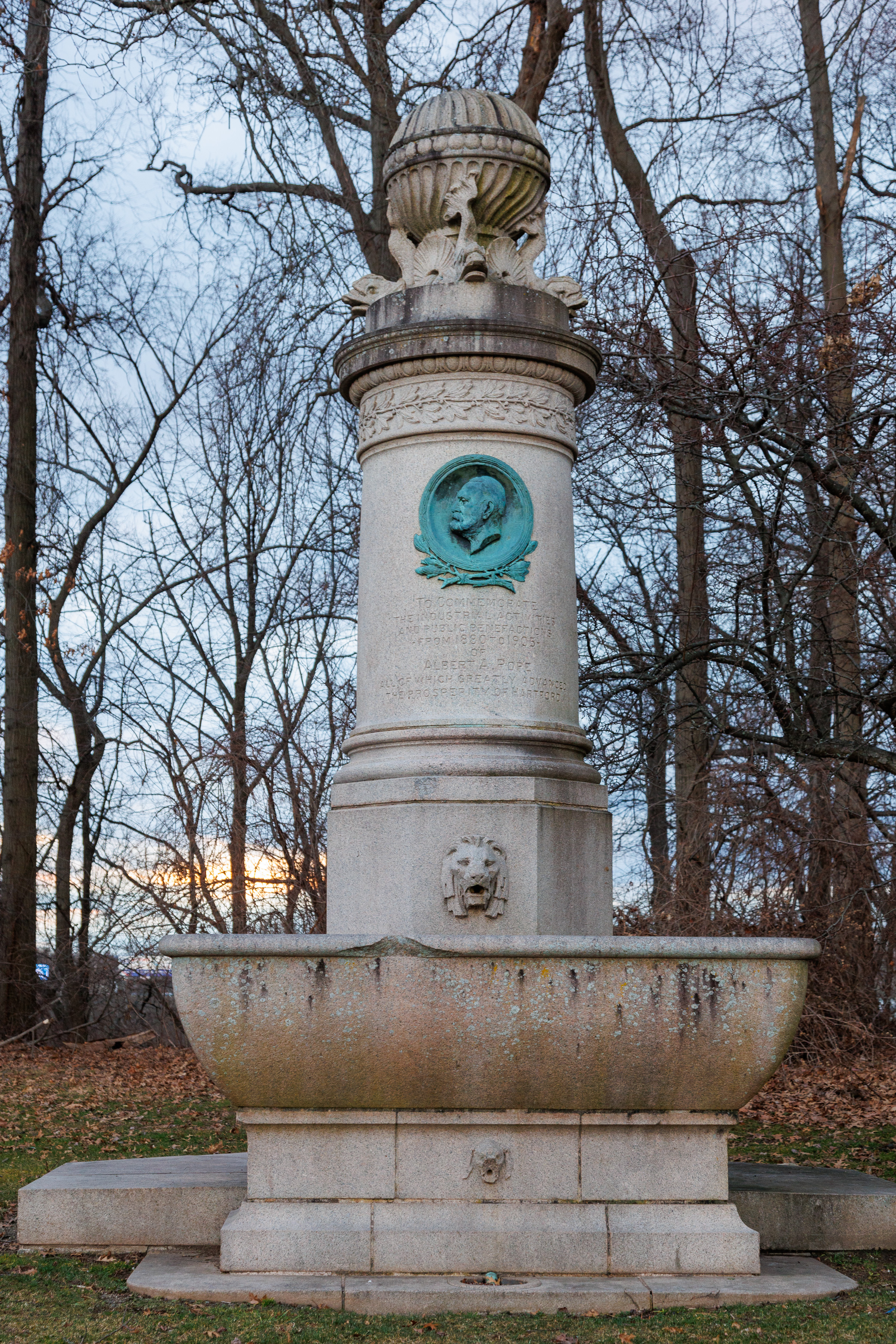
Albert Pope Memorial Horse Trough and Fountain in Pope Park

=== Pope Park ===
Pope donated the land for Pope Park to the city of Hartford in 1894 and provided an endowment for its upkeep. A horse trough and fountain was dedicated to him in the park.

Following his death, some companies joined the United States Motor Company. Pope's empire collapsed in 1913.

== Pope companies ==
- Pope Manufacturing Company
- American Bicycle Company

== Bibliography ==
- Epperson, Bruce D. (2010). Peddling Bicycles to America: The Rise of an Industry. Jefferson, North Carolina: McFarland and Company. ISBN 978-0786447800.
- Flink, James J. (1988). The Automobile Age. Cambridge, Massachusetts: MIT Press. ISBN 978-0262560559.
- Goddard, Stephen B. (2000). Col. Pope & his American Dream Machines: The Life and Times of a Bicycle Tycoon Turned Automotive Pioneer. Jefferson, North Carolina: McFarland and Company. ISBN 978-0786409211.
- Herlihy, David V. (2004). Bicycle: The History. New Haven, Connecticut: Yale University Press. ISBN 978-0300120479.
