= West End Historic District =

West End Historic District, or Westend Historic District, and variations with Commercial or Old or other, may refer to:

in the United States

(by state)

- West End Historic District (Santa Rosa, California)
- West End North Historic District (Hartford and West Hartford, Connecticut), listed on the National Register of Historic Places (NRHP) in Hartford County, Connecticut
- West End South Historic District (Hartford and West Hartford, Connecticut), listed on the NRHP in Hartford County, Connecticut
- West End Historic District (New Britain, Connecticut), listed on the NRHP in Hartford County, Connecticut
- West End Commercial District (Winsted, Connecticut), listed on the NRHP in Litchfield County, Connecticut
- West End Historic District (Atlanta, Georgia), listed on the NRHP in Fulton County
- West End Historic District (Augusta, Georgia)
- Harrisburg-West End Historic District, Augusta, GA, listed on the NRHP in Richmond County, Georgia
- West End Historic District (Decatur, Illinois), listed on the NRHP in Macon County, Illinois
- West End Historic District (Fort Wayne, Indiana), listed on the NRHP in Allen County, Indiana
- Old West End Historic District (Muncie, Indiana), listed on the NRHP in Delaware County, Indiana
- West End Historic District (Meridian, Mississippi), listed on the NRHP in Mississippi
- West End Historic District (Springville, New York), listed on the NRHP in Erie County, New York
- West End Historic District (Kings Mountain, North Carolina), listed on the NRHP in Cleveland County, North Carolina
- West End Historic District (Winston-Salem, North Carolina), listed on the NRHP in Forsyth County, North Carolina
- Old West End District (Toledo, Ohio), listed on the NRHP in Lucas County, Ohio
- Alphabet Historic District, Portland, Oregon, also known as "Portland West End Historic District"
- West End Commercial Historic District (Greenville, South Carolina), listed on the NRHP in Greenville County, South Carolina
- Columbia West End Historic District, Columbia, Tennessee, listed on the NRHP in Maury County, Tennessee
- Hillsboro-West End Historic District, Nashville, Tennessee, listed on the NRHP in Davidson County, Tennessee
- Richland-West End Historic District, Nashville, Tennessee, listed on the NRHP in Davidson County, Tennessee
- West End Historic District (Nashville, Tennessee)
- West End Historic District (Dallas, Texas), listed on the NRHP as Westend Historic District
- West End Historic District (Waxahachie, Texas), listed on the NRHP in Ellis County
- West End Historic District (Suffolk, Virginia), listed on the NRHP in Suffolk County, Virginia
