= John Steele House =

John Steele House may refer to:

- John Steele House (Stoneham, Massachusetts), listed on the National Register of Historic Places in Middlesex County, Massachusetts
- John Steele House (Salisbury, North Carolina), listed on the National Register of Historic Places in Rowan County, North Carolina
- John Steele House (Toquerville, Utah), listed on the National Register of Historic Places in Washington County, Utah

== See also ==
- Steele House (disambiguation)
