= Beardsley House =

Beardsley House may refer to:

- Capt. Philo Beardsley House, Kent, Connecticut
- Beardsley–Mix House, West Hartford, Connecticut
- Dr. Havilah Beardsley House, Elkhart, Indiana
- Ezra E. and Florence (Holmes) Beardsley House, Bronson Township, Michigan
- Beardsley-Oliver House, Olean, New York
