= Steele House =

Steele House may refer to:

- Steele-Fowler House, Huntsville, Alabama, listed on the National Register of Historic Places (NRHP)
- Steele House (Denver, Colorado), 555 S. Downing, Denver, Colorado, designed by architects Marean & Norton
- Allyn Steele House, West Hartford, Connecticut, NRHP-listed
- House at 7246 San Carlos, Jacksonville, Florida, also known as the Steele House, NRHP-listed
- Steele-Cobb House, Decatur, Georgia, listed on the NRHP in DeKalb County, Georgia
- T.C. Steele Boyhood Home, Waveland, Indiana, listed on the NRHP in Montgomery County, Indiana
- Theodore Clement Steele House and Studio, Nashville, Indiana, listed on the NRHP in Brown County, Indiana
- Robert Steele House, Keene, Kentucky, listed on the NRHP in Jessamine County, Kentucky
- Drewsilla Steele House, Lexington, Kentucky, listed on the NRHP in Fayette County, Kentucky
- Stone House on Steele's Grant, Tyrone, Kentucky, listed on the NRHP in Woodford County, Kentucky
- John Steele House (Stoneham, Massachusetts), NRHP-listed, in Middlesex County
- L.C. Steele House, Corinth, Mississippi, listed on the NRHP in Alcorn County, Mississippi
- Steele House (Brooklyn, New York), listed as a New York City Designated Landmark
- Steele Hall (Syracuse University), Syracuse, New York
- John Steele House (Salisbury, North Carolina), listed on the National Register of Historic Places in Rowan County, North Carolina
- William Steele House, Bethesda, Tennessee, a historic, house in the Williamson County unincorporated community of Bethesda
- William Steele House, Franklin, Tennessee, listed on the NRHP in Williamson County
- Steele Hall (Memphis, Tennessee)
- Wardlaw-Steele House, Ripley, Tennessee, listed on the NRHP in Lauderdale County, Tennessee
- Steele House (Navasota, Texas), listed on the NRHP in Grimes County, Texas
- John Steele House (Toquerville, Utah), listed on the National Register of Historic Places in Washington County, Utah
- Fowler-Steele House, Windsor, Vermont, listed on the National Register of Historic Places in Windsor County, Vermont
- Alden Hatch Steele House, Olympia, Washington, listed on the NRHP in Thurston County, Washington
- Steele Homestead, Boulder, Wyoming, list on the NRHP in Sublette County, Wyoming

== See also ==
- John Steele House (disambiguation)
- Steele's Iron Works (40LS15), Napier, Tennessee, listed on the NRHP in Tennessee
