= Steele Hall (disambiguation) =

Steele Hall may refer to:

== Buildings ==
- Steele Hall (State University of New York at Fredonia), Fredonia, New York, USA
- Steele Hall (Syracuse University), Syracuse, New York, USA, listed on the National Register of Historic Places
- Steele Hall (Northern State University), residence hall in Aberdeen, South Dakota, USA
- Steele Hall (Bennett College), Greensboro, North Carolina, USA, listed on the National Register of Historic Places
- Steele Hall (LeMoyne-Owen College), Memphis, Tennessee, USA

== People ==
- Steele Hall, Australian politician (1928–2024)
- Steele Hall (baseball), baseball player (born 2007)

== See also ==
- Steele House (disambiguation)
