= Spanish House =

(The) Spanish House may refer to:

- Spanish House, Reed College, Portland, Oregon
- The Spanish House (West Hartford, Connecticut)
- The Spanish House (novel), a 1938 novel by Eleanor Smith
