= Whitman House (West Hartford, Connecticut) =

Historic house in Connecticut, United States

- U.S. National Register of Historic Places
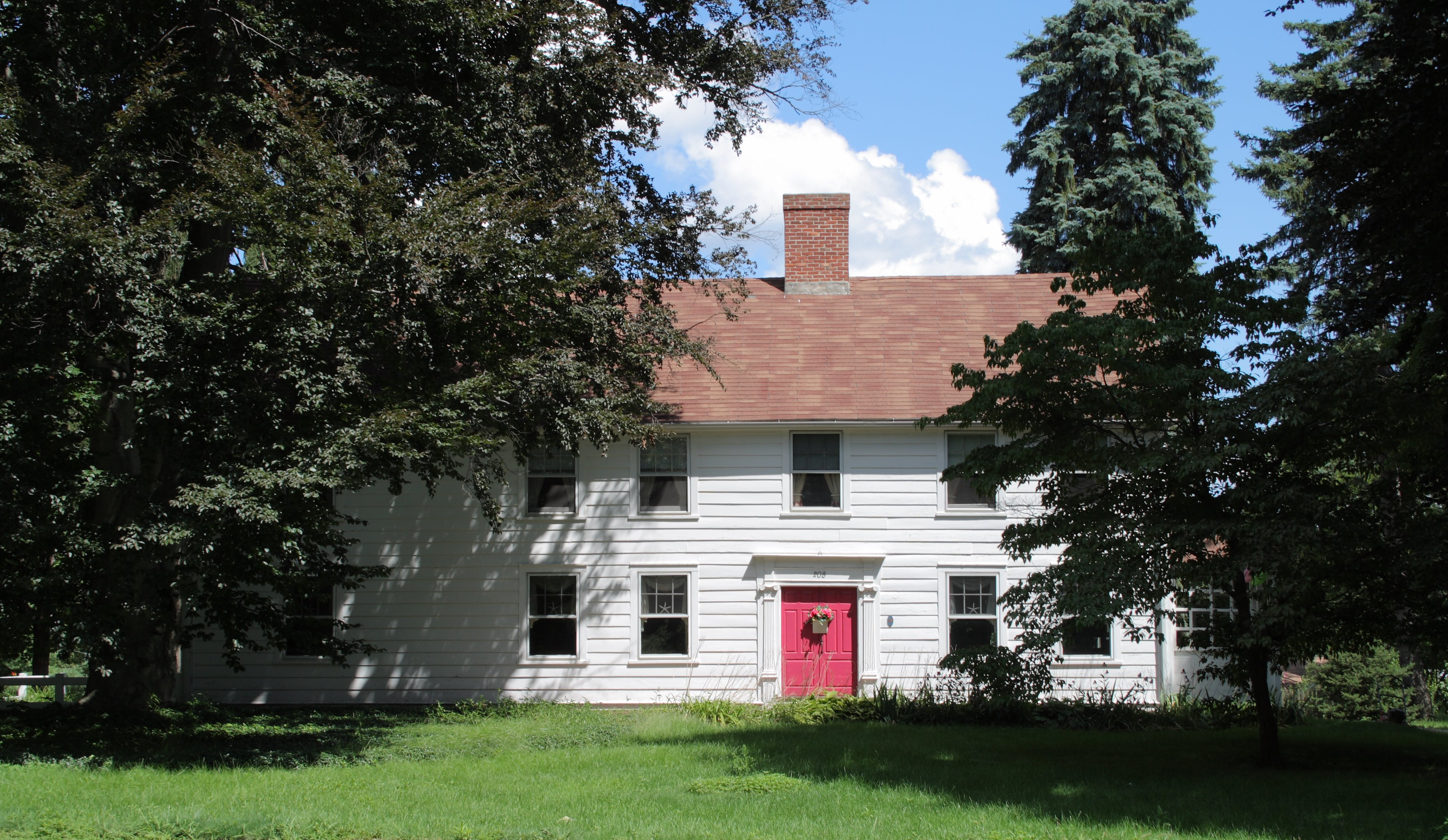

- Location within Connecticut Location within the United States
- Location: 208 North Main Street, West Hartford, Connecticut
- Coordinates: 41°46′33″N 72°44′43″W
- Area: 0.7 acres (0.28 ha)
- Built: 1764
- Architect: Whitman, John, Jr.
- Architectural style: Colonial
- MPS: Eighteenth-Century Houses of West Hartford TR
- NRHP reference No.: 86002028
- Added to NRHP: September 10, 1986

The Whitman House is a historic house at 208 North Main Street in West Hartford, Connecticut. Built about 1764, it is one of the town's few surviving 18th-century buildings. It was listed on the National Register of Historic Places on September 10, 1986.

== Description and history ==
The Whitman House is located north of West Hartford center, on the east side of North Main Street, a short way south of its junction with Clifford Lane. It is a 2 1/2-story wood-frame structure, with a large central chimney, gabled roof, and clapboarded exterior on a brownstone foundation. A rear leanto section gives it a saltbox appearance. The main facade is six bays wide, with asymmetrical window placement. The main entrance is off-center, and is a wide two-leaf entry flanked by fluted pilasters and topped by a corniced entablature. The interior retains a number of original period features, includes raised paneling and wainscoting.

The original five-bay section of the house was built c. 1764 by John Whitman, Jr., possibly on the site of an older 17th-century house. Whitman was a prominent landowner who was involved in petitions to separate West Hartford from Hartford, and was the brother of Sarah Whitman Hooker, whose house also still stands. The house was widened about 1813, and underwent a major architect-led rehabilitation in 1913. A prominent early 20th-century resident was Frederick Duffy, a dairy farmer who introduced milking machines and the storage of grain in silos to the area. Other notable residents include Frederick Duffy's son, Ward Everett Duffy, editor of the Hartford Times newspaper, and his wife, Louise Day Duffy, for whom West Hartford's Duffy Elementary School is named.

== See also ==
- National Register of Historic Places listings in West Hartford, Connecticut
