= National Register of Historic Places listings in West Hartford, Connecticut =

Location of Southington in Connecticut

This is a list of the National Register of Historic Places listings in West Hartford, Connecticut.

This is intended to be a complete list of the properties and districts on the National Register of Historic Places in West Hartford, Connecticut, United States. The locations of National Register properties and districts for which the latitude and longitude coordinates are included below, may be seen in various online maps.

There are more than 400 properties and districts listed on the National Register in Hartford County, including 21 National Historic Landmarks. The 32 properties and districts located in the town of West Hartford include two National Historic Landmarks and are listed below. The properties and districts in the remaining parts of the county are listed separately. Six properties and districts straddle the border between West Hartford and Hartford and appear in both lists.

Contents: Counties and municipalities in Connecticut

Fairfield (city of Bridgeport | town of Greenwich | city of Stamford) | Hartford (city of Hartford | town of Southington | town of West Hartford | town of Windsor) | Litchfield | Middlesex (city of Middletown) | New Haven (city of New Haven) | New London | Tolland | Windham

This National Park Service list is complete through NPS recent listings posted April 3, 2026.

== Current listings ==
	Name on the Register	Image	Date listed	Location	City or town	Description
1	Charles E. Beach House	Charles E. Beach House	August 23, 1990 (#90001287)	18 Brightwood Lane; 41°43′58″N 72°44′31″W		
2	Beardsley-Mix House	Beardsley-Mix House	September 10, 1986 (#86001980)	81 Rockledge Drive; 41°44′41″N 72°44′38″W		
3	Moses Brace-Uriah Cadwell House	Moses Brace-Uriah Cadwell House	September 10, 1986 (#86001982)	11 Flagg Road; 41°47′06″N 72°45′00″W		
4	James Butler House	James Butler House	September 10, 1986 (#86001987)	239 North Main Street; 41°46′40″N 72°44′48″W		
5	Benjamin Colton House	Benjamin Colton House	September 10, 1986 (#86001988)	25 Sedgewick Road; 41°45′09″N 72°44′45″W		
6	Elizabeth Park	Elizabeth Park	March 10, 1983 (#83001259)	Asylum Avenue; 41°46′20″N 72°43′04″W		Extends into Hartford
7	Samuel Farnsworth House	Samuel Farnsworth House	September 10, 1986 (#86001990)	537 Mountain Road; 41°46′50″N 72°45′59″W		
8	Asa Gillett House	Asa Gillett House	September 10, 1986 (#86001992)	202 South Main Street; 41°44′55″N 72°44′48″W		
9	Timothy Goodman House	Timothy Goodman House	September 10, 1986 (#86001993)	567 Quaker Lane South; 41°44′42″N 72°43′50″W		
10	Hartford Golf Club Historic District	Hartford Golf Club Historic District	June 26, 1986 (#86001370)	Roughly bounded by Simsbury Road and Bloomfield Avenue, Northmoor Road, Albany Avenue, and Mohegan Drive; 41°47′33″N 72°43′31″W		Extends into Hartford
11	Sarah Whitman Hooker House	Sarah Whitman Hooker House	November 1, 1979 (#79002627)	1237 New Britain Avenue; 41°43′53″N 72°44′35″W		
12	Daniel Hosmer House	Daniel Hosmer House	September 10, 1986 (#86001985)	253 North Main Street; 41°46′44″N 72°44′50″W		
13	House at 847 Main Street North	House at 847 Main Street North	September 10, 1986 (#86001996)	847 Main Street North; 41°47′26″N 72°44′52″W		
14	Edward W. Morley House	Edward W. Morley House	May 15, 1975 (#75002057)	26 Westland Avenue; 41°45′21″N 72°45′36″W		Home of the scientist known for the Michelson–Morley experiment and for his work on the atomic weights of hydrogen and oxygen.
15	Mount St. Joseph Academy	Mount St. Joseph Academy	December 22, 1983 (#83003561)	235 Fern Street; 41°46′05″N 72°43′26″W		
16	Old Center Burying Yard	Old Center Burying Yard	May 3, 2002 (#02000421)	30 North Main Street; 41°45′58″N 72°44′30″W		
17	Prospect Avenue Historic District	Prospect Avenue Historic District	August 29, 1985 (#85001918)	Roughly bounded by Albany Avenue, North Branch Park River, Elizabeth and Fern Streets, Prospect and Asylum Avenues, and Sycamore Road; 41°46′43″N 72°42′38″W		Extends into Hartford
18	Revolutionary War Campsite	Revolutionary War Campsite	April 24, 1986 (#86000853)	On the grounds of MDC Reservoir #6; 41°47′40″N 72°46′46″W		A Revolutionary War campsite and military hospital.
19	Elisha Seymour Jr. House	Elisha Seymour Jr. House	September 10, 1986 (#86001997)	410-412 Park Road; 41°45′19″N 72°44′00″W		
20	The Spanish House	The Spanish House	June 14, 1979 (#79002632)	46 Fernwood Road; 41°46′16″N 72°43′28″W		
21	Stanley-Woodruff-Allen House	Stanley-Woodruff-Allen House	September 10, 1986 (#86002000)	37 Buena Vista Road; 41°44′58″N 72°46′00″W		
22	Allyn Steele House	Allyn Steele House	September 10, 1986 (#86002022)	114 North Main Street; 41°46′11″N 72°44′37″W		
23	Temple Beth Israel	Temple Beth Israel	November 27, 1995 (#95001343)	701 Farmington Avenue; 41°45′53″N 72°43′12″W		
24	Watkinson Juvenile Asylum and Farm School	Watkinson Juvenile Asylum and Farm School	March 23, 1995 (#95000273)	140, 180 and 190 Bloomfield Avenue; 41°47′24″N 72°42′45″W		Extends into Hartford; now known as the Watkinson School.
25	Noah Webster Birthplace	Noah Webster Birthplace	October 15, 1966 (#66000886)	227 South Main Street; 41°44′46″N 72°44′47″W		Home of the American lexicographer.
26	Noah Webster Memorial Library	Noah Webster Memorial Library	July 30, 1981 (#81000534)	7 North Main Street; 41°45′41″N 72°43′07″W		
27	John Wells Jr. House	John Wells Jr. House	September 10, 1986 (#86002025)	505 Mountain Road; 41°46′42″N 72°45′59″W		
28	West End North Historic District	West End North Historic District	July 25, 1985 (#85001618)	Roughly bounded by Farmington Avenue, Lorraine, Elizabeth, and Highland Streets; 41°46′09″N 72°42′44″W		Extends into Hartford
29	West End South Historic District	West End South Historic District	April 11, 1985 (#85000763)	Roughly bounded by Farmington Avenue, Whitney and South Whitney Streets, West Boulevard, and Prospect Avenue; 41°45′47″N 72°42′52″W		Extends into Hartford
30	West Hill Historic District	West Hill Historic District	November 29, 1996 (#96001366)	West Hill Drive bounded by Farmington Avenue; 41°45′59″N 72°43′28″W		
31	Whiting Homestead	Whiting Homestead	August 3, 1987 (#87001291)	291 North Main Street; 41°46′50″N 72°44′50″W		
32	Whitman House	Whitman House	September 10, 1986 (#86002028)	208 North Main Street; 41°46′33″N 72°44′43″W		

== See also ==
- List of National Historic Landmarks in Connecticut
- National Register of Historic Places listings in Connecticut
