= Asa Gillett House =

Historic house in Connecticut, United States

- U.S. National Register of Historic Places
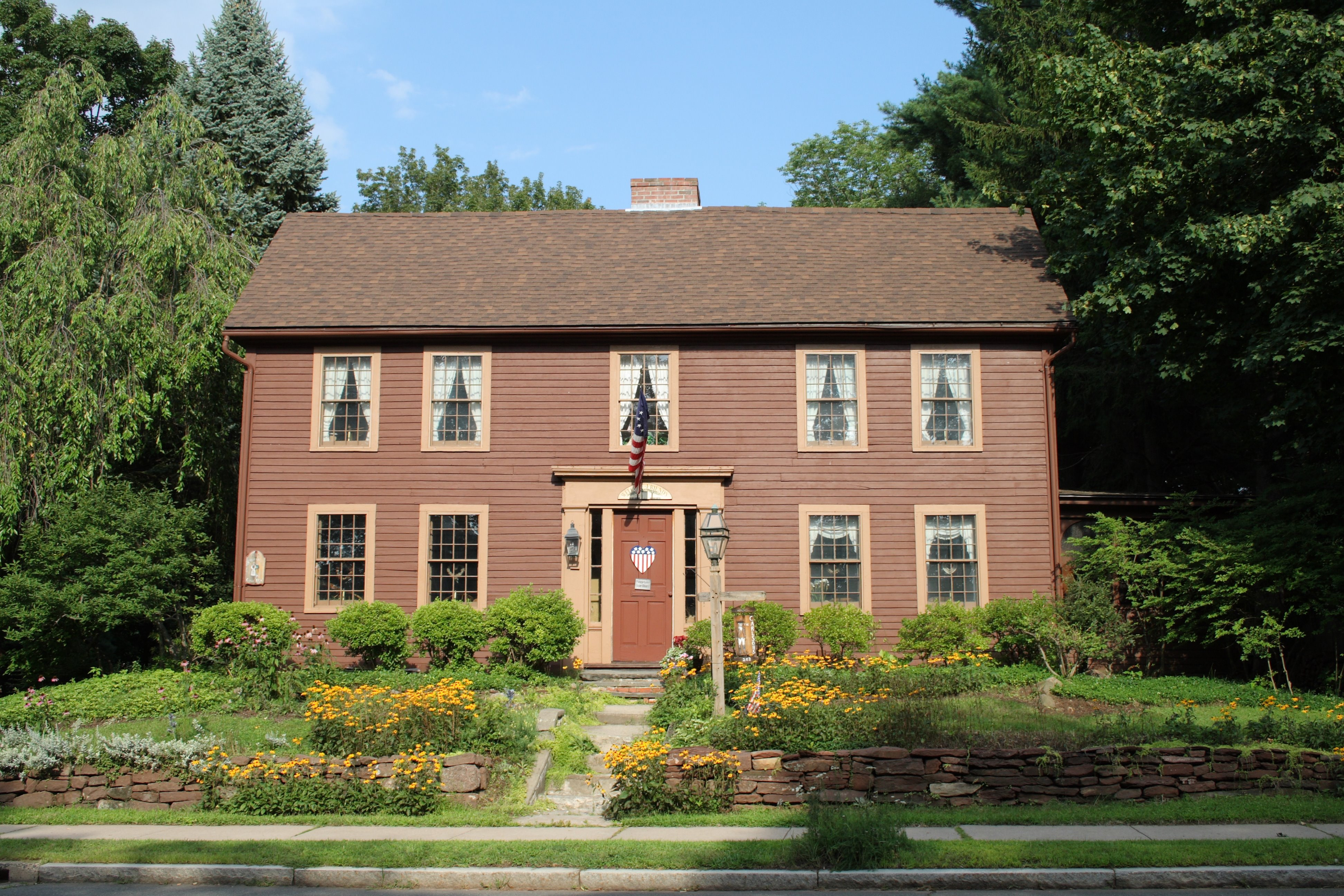

- Location within Connecticut Location within the United States
- Location: 202 South Main Street, West Hartford, Connecticut
- Coordinates: 41°44′55″N 72°44′48″W
- Area: 0.7 acres (0.28 ha)
- Built: 1760
- Architect: Gillett, Asa
- Architectural style: Colonial (saltbox)
- MPS: Eighteenth-Century Houses of West Hartford TR
- NRHP reference No.: 86001992
- Added to NRHP: September 10, 1986

The Asa Gillett House is a historic house at 202 South Main Street in West Hartford, Connecticut. Built in 1760 for the grandson of one of the area's early settlers, it is one of the town's few remaining 18th-century houses. It was listed on the National Register of Historic Places on September 10, 1986.

== Description and history ==
The Asa Gillett House stands on the east side of South Main Street, south of downtown West Hartford and a short way north of the Noah Webster House. The front of its property is lined by a low brownstone retaining wall. The house is a 2 1/2-story wood-frame structure, five bays wide, with a large central chimney. The main entrance, centered on the front facade, is flanked by sidelight windows and pilasters, and topped by an entablature. The main block is extended by a single-story ell to the right, and a two-story ell to the rear.

The house was probably built in the mid-18th century by Asa Gillett, grandson of one of West Hartford's early proprietors. Joseph Gillett settled the area in 1694, and was one of the signatories to a petition for a western parish of Hartford, which the area was then part of. He was also a founding organizer of the new Congregational church. Asa Gillett was primarily a merchant, although other Gilletts were active in farming the surrounding land.

== See also ==
- National Register of Historic Places listings in West Hartford, Connecticut
