= Hartford Golf Club Historic District =

Historic district in Connecticut, United States

- U.S. National Register of Historic Places
- U.S. Historic district
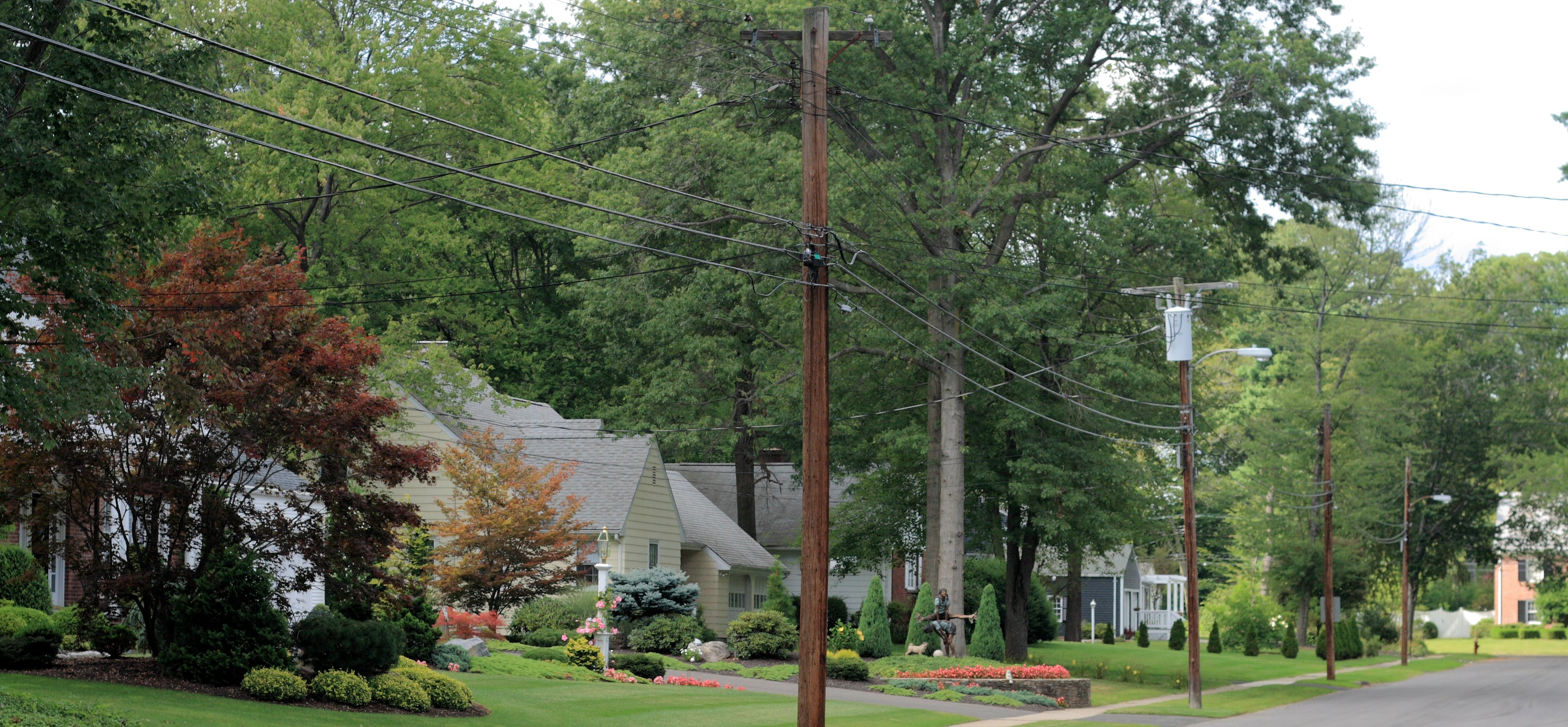

- Location within Connecticut Location within the United States
- Location: Roughly bounded by Simsbury Road and Bloomfield Avenue, Northmoor Road, Albany Avenue, and Mohegan Drive, Hartford, Connecticut
- Coordinates: 41°47′33″N 72°43′31″W
- Area: 500 acres (200 ha)
- Built: 1915
- Architect: Hayman, Milton E.; Et al.
- Architectural style: Colonial Revival, Tudor Revival, French Norman Chateau
- NRHP reference No.: 86001370
- Added to NRHP: June 26, 1986

The Hartford Golf Club Historic District encompasses a golf course and adjacent residential neighborhood in West Hartford and Hartford, Connecticut. The area, developed between 1915 and 1936, includes the Hartford Golf Club, designed by Donald Ross, the area's oldest golf course, and a neighborhood with a high concentration of high quality Colonial and Tudor Revival houses. It is roughly bounded by Simsbury Road on the north, Bloomfield Avenue on the east, Albany Avenue to the south, and Mohegan Drive to the west. The district was listed on the National Register of Historic Places in 1986.

== Description and history ==
The Hartford Golf Club was founded in 1896, and immediately became a magnet for the social and business elite of Hartford. Its first golf course was built south of the present property, between Albany and Asylum Avenues. That course's thirteen-hole layout was problematic due to the terrain, and the club in 1914 purchased the southern portion of its present holdings. It hired Donald Ross to design the holes in this area, where fourteen holes were built. An eighteen-hole course was then made out of those plus four holes south of Albany Avenue. In 1945, the club purchased the northernmost portion of its land, which was developed with thirteen new holes, apparently also based on Donald Ross designs. The land south of Albany Avenue was sold in 1955.

The golf club's 1914 purchased kicked off a residential construction boom to its southwest. Over the next twenty years, a neighborhood of high quality Tudor Revival and Colonial Revival houses were built on large well-landscaped lots, and it came to be one of West Hartford's most fashionable neighborhoods of the period. Roads were laid out in large rectangles, and properties adjacent to the golf were the largest and most lavish in the neighborhood.

== See also ==
- National Register of Historic Places listings in West Hartford, Connecticut
- National Register of Historic Places listings in Hartford, Connecticut
