= Elisha Seymour Jr. House =

Historic house in Connecticut, United States

- U.S. National Register of Historic Places
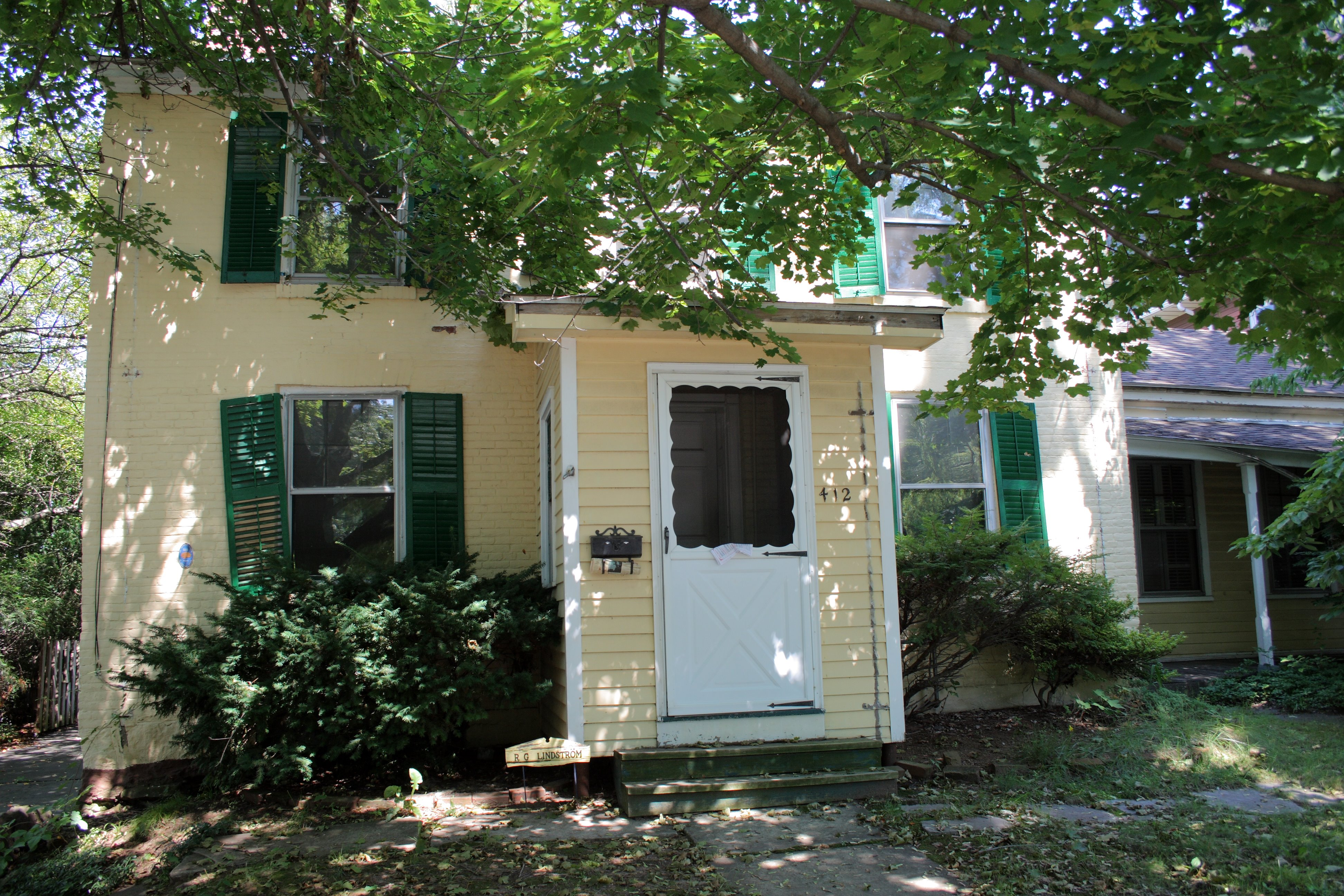

- Location within Connecticut Location within the United States
- Location: 410-412 Park Road, West Hartford, Connecticut
- Coordinates: 41°45′19″N 72°44′0″W
- Area: 0.4 acres (0.16 ha)
- Built: 1770
- Architectural style: Colonial
- MPS: Eighteenth-Century Houses of West Hartford TR
- NRHP reference No.: 86001997
- Added to NRHP: September 10, 1986

The Elisha Seymour Jr. House is a historic house at 410-412 Park Road in West Hartford, Connecticut. Built about 1770, it is one of the town's few surviving pre-independence brick buildings. It was listed on the National Register of Historic Places in 1986.

== Description and history ==
The Elisha Seymour Jr. House stands West of the Center of West Hartford, on the North Side of Park Road between Trout Brook Drive and Jessamine Street. It is a 1 1/2-story painted brick building, with a side gable roof and interior end chimneys. Its main facade is three bays wide, with the main entrance in the center, sheltered by an enclosed wood frame vestibule, finished with a gable roof and clapboards. A single-story gabled ell extends to the right, in front of which is a hip-roofed open porch supported by square columns.

The house is estimated to have been built about 1770. Its first documented owner was Elisha Seymour Jr., a shoemaker. It is a modest example of brick residential architecture of the period, but is locally significant because it is one of the few pre-independence brick buildings in West Hartford.

== See also ==
- National Register of Historic Places listings in West Hartford, Connecticut
