= Moses Brace–Uriah Cadwell House =

Historic house in Connecticut, United States

- U.S. National Register of Historic Places
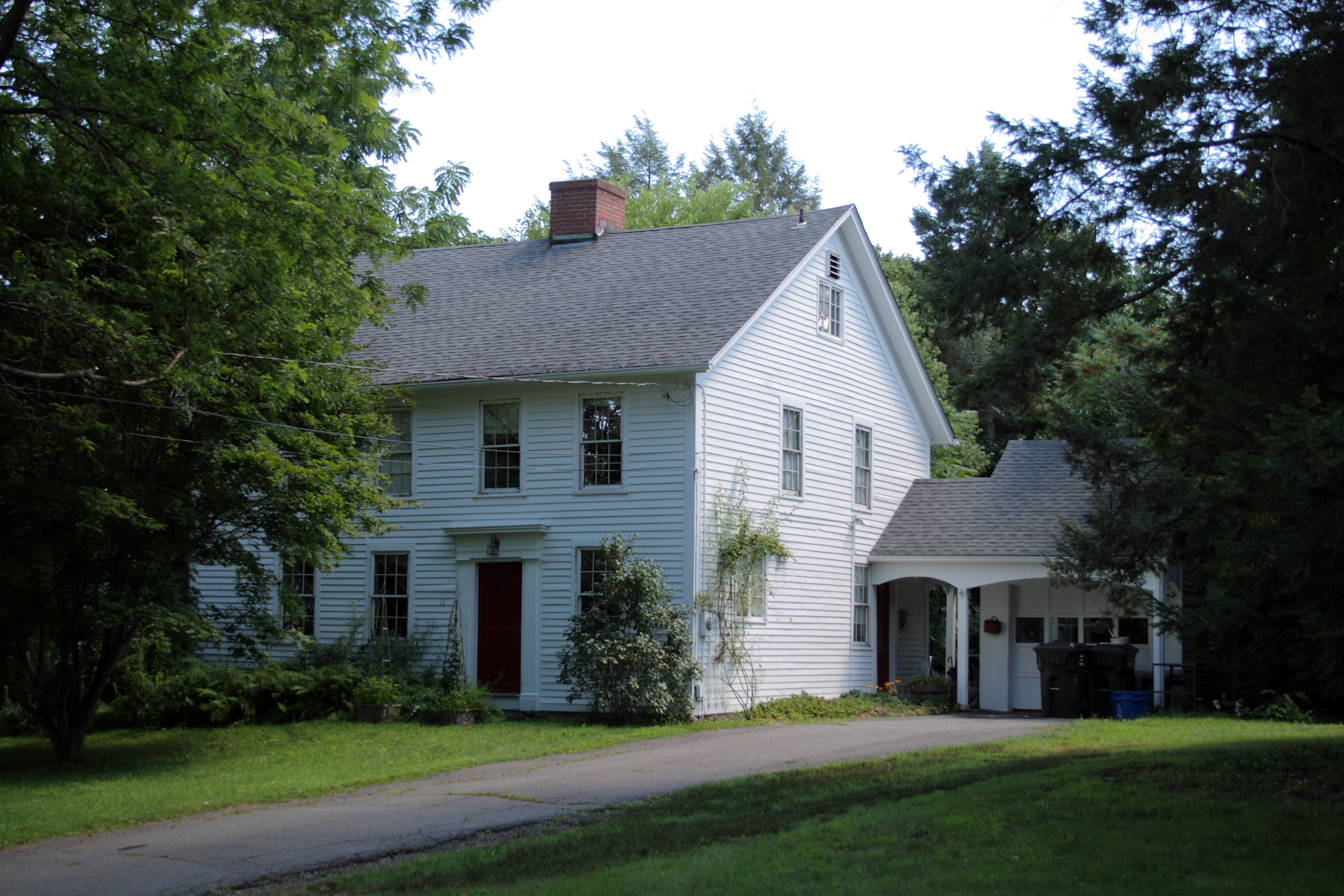

- Location within Connecticut Location within the United States
- Location: 11 Flagg Road, West Hartford, Connecticut
- Coordinates: 41°47′6″N 72°45′0″W
- Area: 0.8 acres (0.32 ha)
- Built: 1766
- Architectural style: Colonial
- MPS: Eighteenth-Century Houses of West Hartford TR
- NRHP reference No.: 86001982
- Added to NRHP: September 10, 1986

The Moses Brace–Uriah Cadwell House is a historic house at 11 Flagg Road in West Hartford, Connecticut. Built in 1766, it is one of West Hartford's few surviving 18th-century buildings. It was listed on the National Register of Historic Places in 1986.

== Description and history ==
The Moses Brace–Uriah Cadwell House is located in northern West Hartford, on the south side of Flagg Road just West of its Junction with Albany Avenue. It is a 2 1/2-story wood-frame structure, four bays wide, with a large central chimney and gabled roof. The main entrance is located in the second bay from the right, and is flanked by pilasters and topped by a simple entablature. It is unusually deep for a house of its period, with broader and shallower eaves. The corners are finished with slender pilasters. A 20th-century single-car garage is connected to the right side by a breezeway.

The first house to stand in this area was built in 1733 by Ebenezer Steele. It was sold by Thomas Merrell to Moses Brace in 1790, and was purchased by Uriah Cadwell in 1811. This house was built on the western portion of Steele's property in 1766, which was purchased by Uriah Cadwell in 1799. Cadwell replaced the original Steele house in 1811. Cadwell apparently lived in the other house while this one underwent alterations, sometime between 1811 and 1832.

== See also ==
- National Register of Historic Places listings in West Hartford, Connecticut
