= Daniel Hosmer House =

Historic house in Connecticut, United States

- U.S. National Register of Historic Places
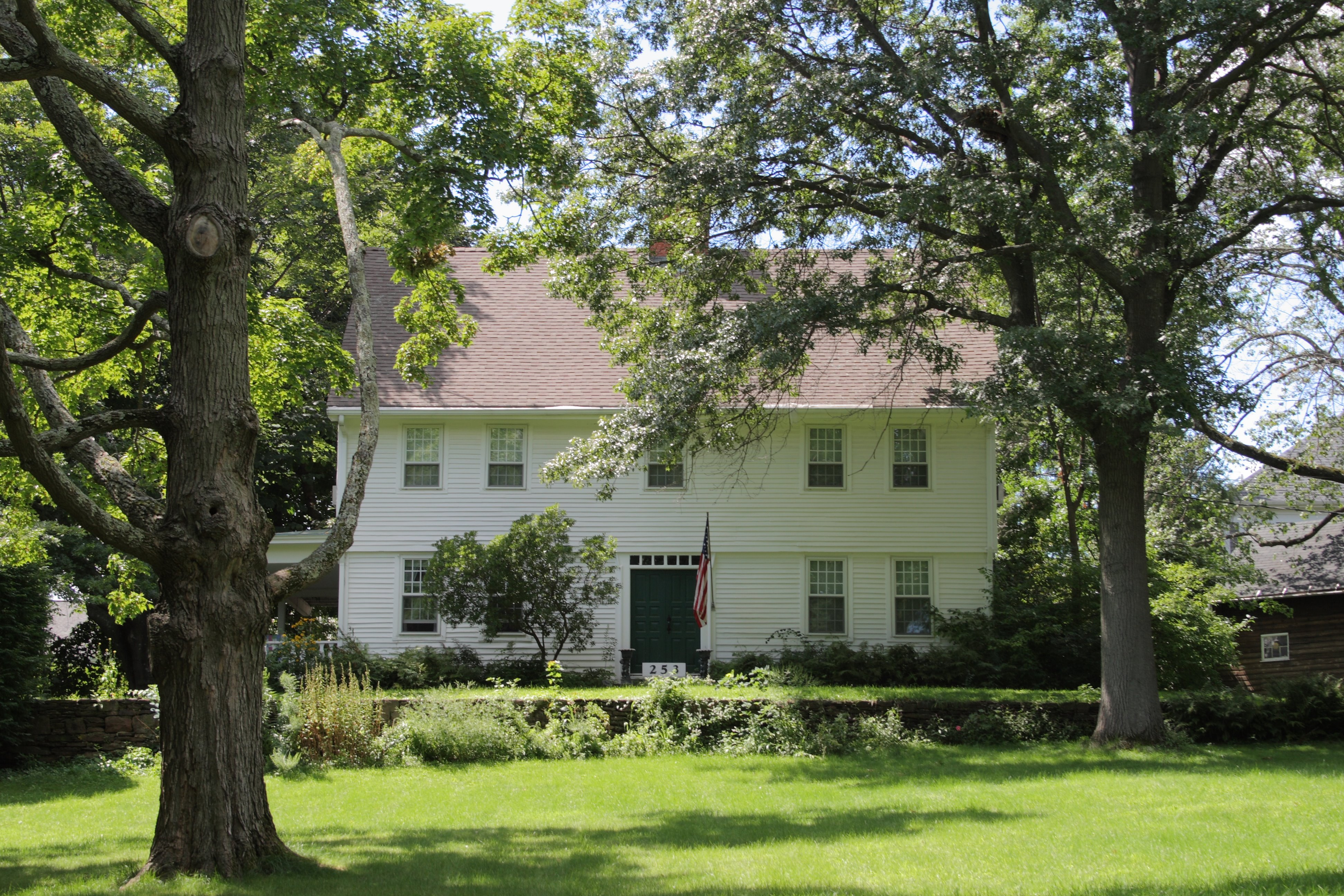

- Location within Connecticut Location within the United States
- Location: 253 North Main Street, West Hartford, Connecticut
- Coordinates: 41°46′44″N 72°44′50″W
- Area: 0.7 acres (0.28 ha)
- Built: 1774
- Architect: Hosmer, Daniel
- Architectural style: Colonial, Center Chimney Colonial
- MPS: Eighteenth-Century Houses of West Hartford TR
- NRHP reference No.: 86001985
- Added to NRHP: September 10, 1986

The Daniel Hosmer House is a historic house at 253 North Main Street in West Hartford, Connecticut. Built about 1774, it is one of the town's small number of surviving 18th-century buildings, and is a well-preserved example of a Georgian farmhouse. The house was listed on the National Register of Historic Places on September 10, 1986.

== Description and history ==
The Daniel Hosmer House is located in central West Hartford, at the southwest corner of North Main Street and Asylum Avenue, both of which are busy through streets. It is set well back, facing North Main Street, with a low brownstone retaining wall marking a probable early route of the road. It is a 2 1/2-story wood-frame structure, with a side-gable roof, central chimney, and clapboarded exterior. Its main facade is five bays wide, with a centered doorway, and overhanging second floor. The doorway is topped by a six-light transom window and flanked by simply-decorated molding. A single-story ell extends to the rear of the main block.

This house was probably built by Daniel Hosmer in 1774, around the time of his marriage, on land belonging to his family. Hosmer was the grandson of Stephen Hosmer, one of West Hartford's first settlers. The area was at the time farmland, and was sold by Hosmer in 1788. The property included a number of farm outbuildings when it was listed on the National Register in 1986; these have since been demolished.

== See also ==
- National Register of Historic Places listings in West Hartford, Connecticut
