= Benjamin Colton House =

Historic house in Connecticut, United States

- U.S. National Register of Historic Places
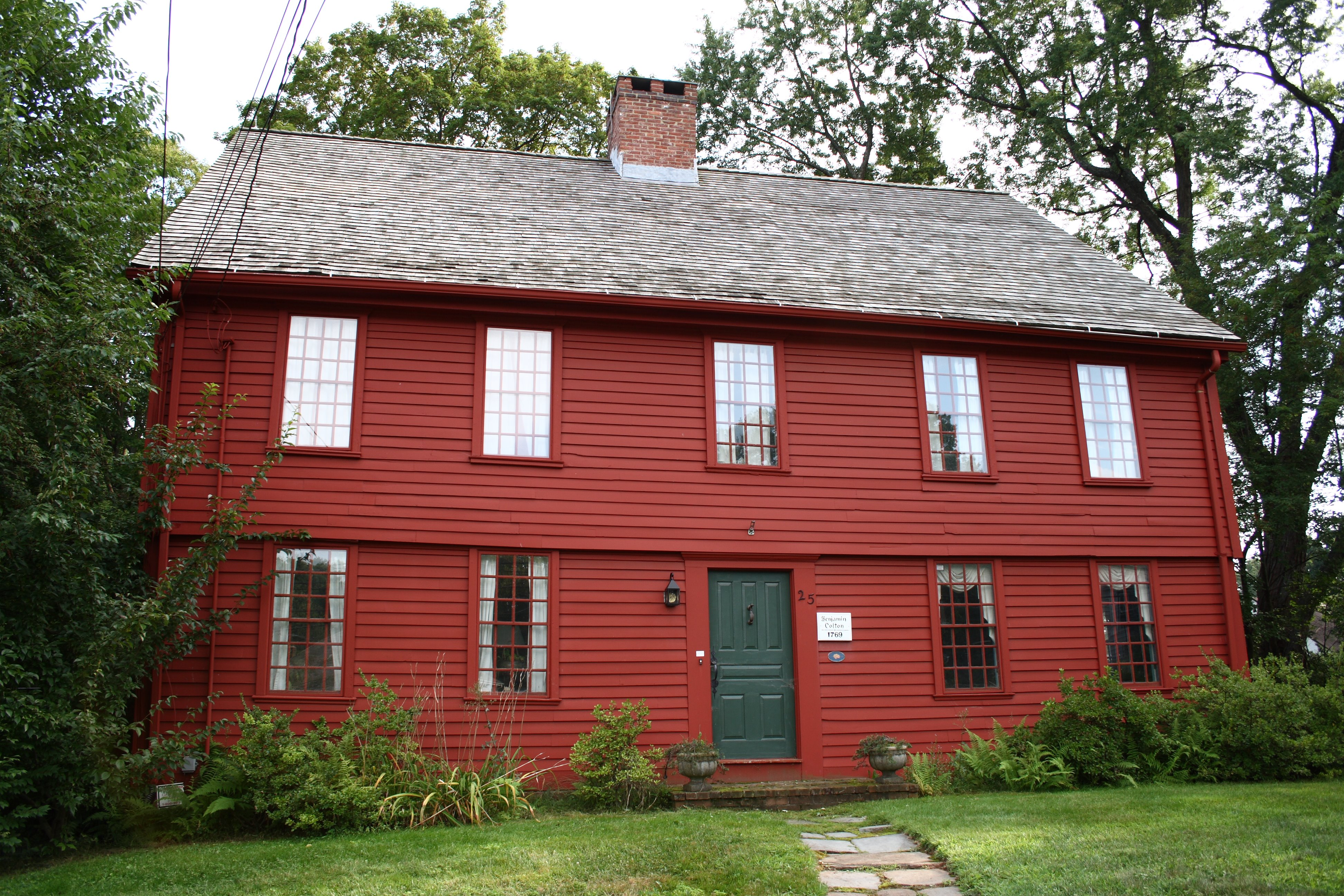

- Location within Connecticut Location within the United States
- Location: 25 Sedgwick Road, West Hartford, Connecticut
- Coordinates: 41°45′9″N 72°44′45″W
- Area: 0.5 acres (0.20 ha)
- Built: 1770
- Architect: Colton, Capt. Benjamin, Jr.
- Architectural style: Colonial, Center Chimney Colonial
- MPS: Eighteenth-Century Houses of West Hartford TR
- NRHP reference No.: 86001988
- Added to NRHP: September 10, 1986

The Benjamin Colton House is a historic house at 25 Sedgwick Road in West Hartford, Connecticut. Probably built about 1770, it is one of the town's few surviving 18th-century houses. It was listed on the National Register of Historic Places on September 10, 1986.

== Description and history ==
The Benjamin Colton House is located in central West Hartford, south of the town center, on the south side of Sedgwick Road at its junction with Ridgebrook Drive. It is a 2 1/2-story wood-frame structure on a brownstone foundation, with five bays and a large central chimney. The main entrance and the windows are simply trimmed, and the second story hangs slightly over both the front and rear, a feature not found on the town's other 18th-century houses. Upper-level windows are set close to the eave.

The land on which this house stands originally belonged to Samuel Sedgwick, one of the area's first settlers. Benjamin Colton Jr. purchased the land where this house stands in 1770 from Benjamin Sedgwick, at which time an older structure stood on it. It is not known whether portions of the older structure survive in this one. Colton was the son of West Hartford's first pastor; his granddaughter married Dr. Edward Brace, who was for many years the town's only doctor.

== See also ==
- National Register of Historic Places listings in West Hartford, Connecticut
