= House at 847 Main Street, North =

Historic house in Connecticut, United States

- U.S. National Register of Historic Places
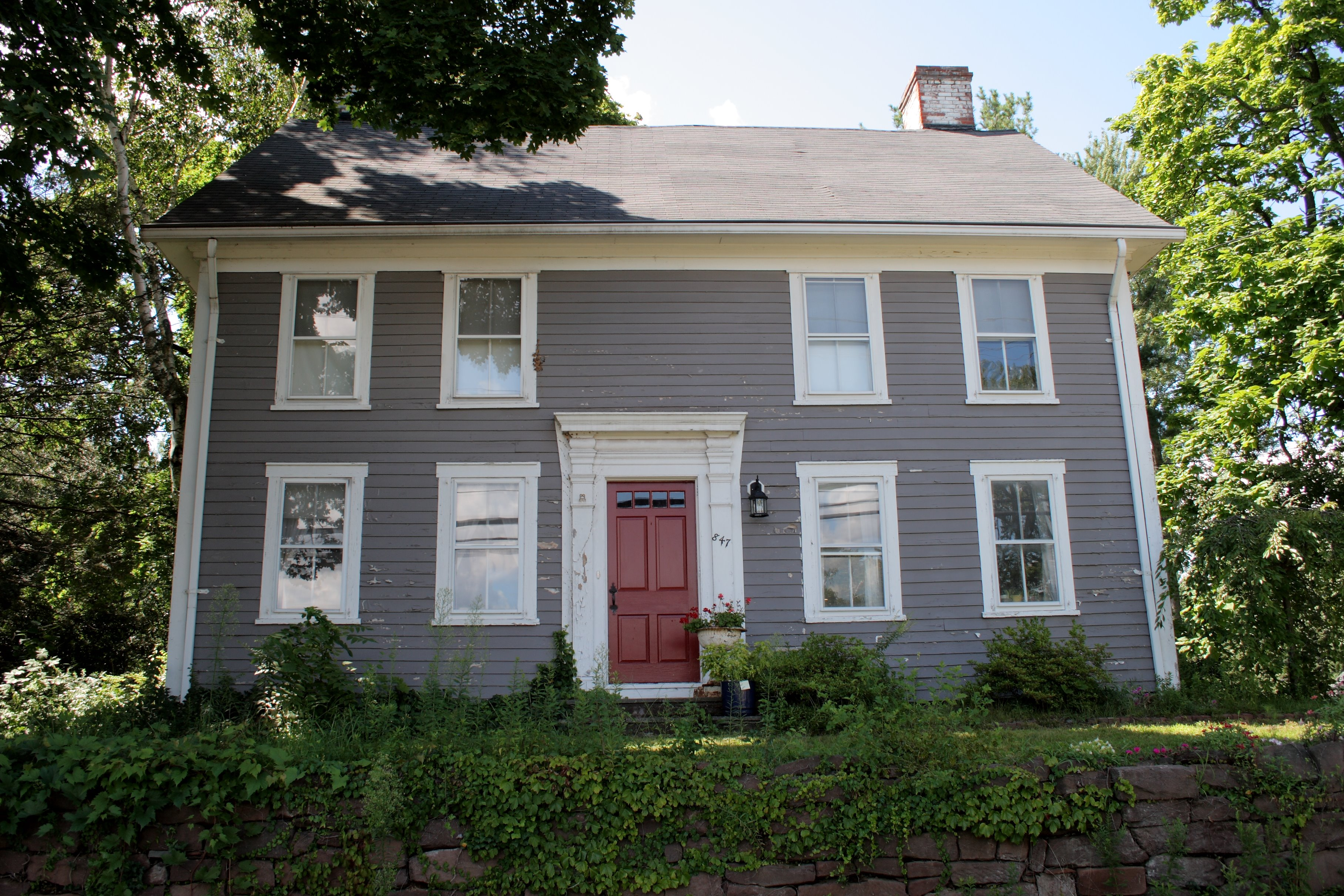

- Location within Connecticut Location within the United States
- Location: 847 Main Street North, West Hartford, Connecticut
- Coordinates: 41°47′26″N 72°44′52″W
- Area: 0.8 acres (0.32 ha)
- Built: 1777
- Architectural style: Georgian
- MPS: Eighteenth-Century Houses of West Hartford TR
- NRHP reference No.: 86001996
- Added to NRHP: September 10, 1986

847 North Main Street in West Hartford, Connecticut, is one of the town's few surviving 18th-century houses. Dating to the mid-18th century, it is a well-preserved example of vernacular Georgian architecture, with a modest entrance surround. The house was listed on the National Register of Historic Places on September 10, 1986.

== Description and history ==
847 North Main Street is located in northern West Hartford, on the west side of North Main Street opposite its junction with Mohawk Drive. It is set on a low rise above the busy street by a brownstone retaining wall. It is a 2 1/2-story wood-frame structure, with two interior chimneys, a side gable roof, and a clapboarded exterior. The main facade is five bays wide, but asymmetrical, with the main entrance slightly off-center. The main entrance is flanked by pilasters and topped by a multi-layered entablature, and there is no window in the bay above. A 1 1/2-story gable-roof ell extends to the rear of the main block.

Documentary research suggests that the house was built about 1877, but it has been placarded with the date 1748, the inscription crediting its early ownership to Gurdon Flagg. The doorway treatment is a clearly Georgian feature, and the missing second-floor window is also typical of that period. The decorative treatment of its eaves is suggestive of mid-19th century alterations.

The house is signed as having been built in 1748, but architectural research suggests it was built c. 1777.

== See also ==
- National Register of Historic Places listings in West Hartford, Connecticut
