= Samuel Farnsworth House =

Historic house in Connecticut, United States

- U.S. National Register of Historic Places
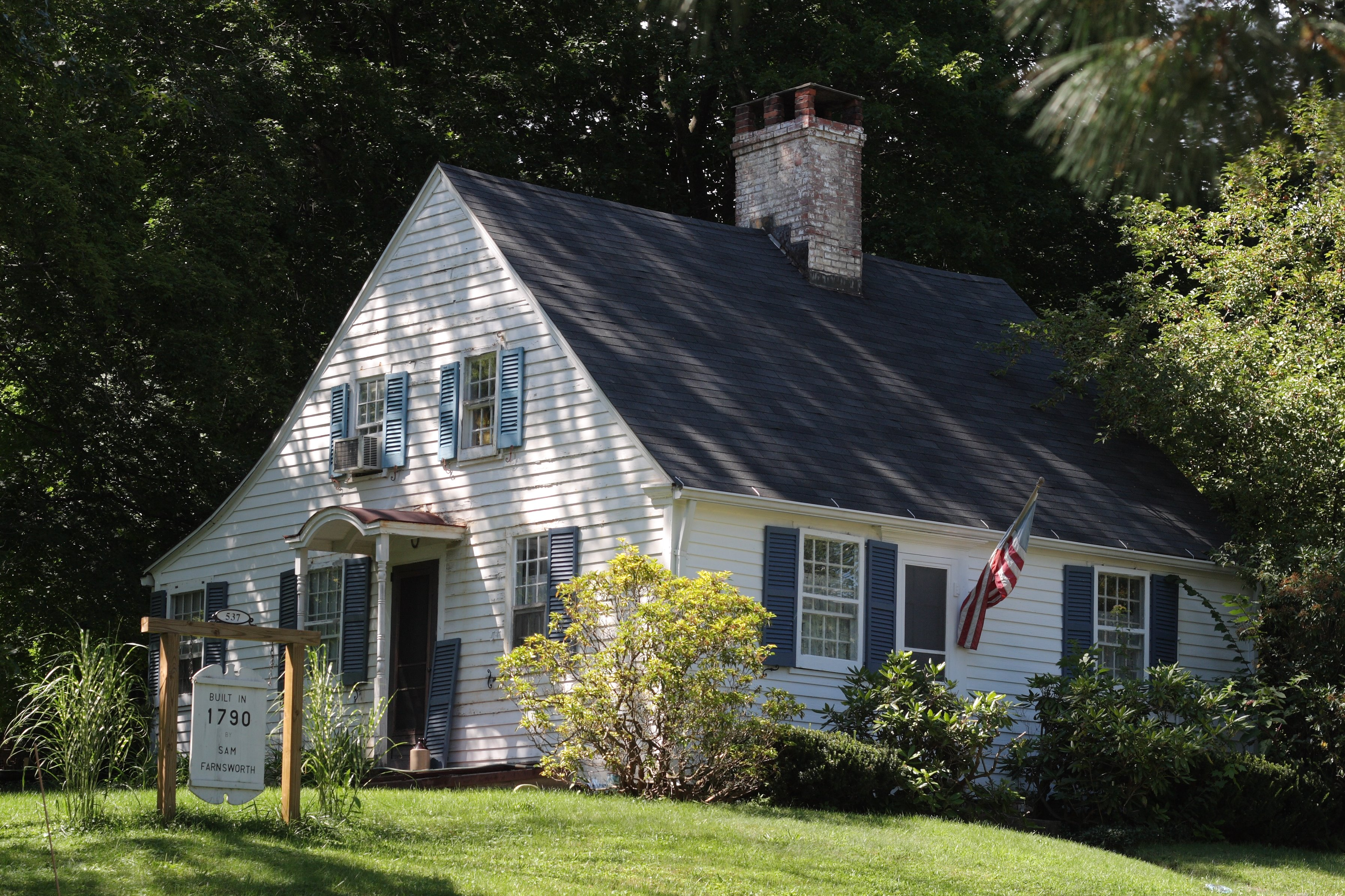

- Location within Connecticut Location within the United States
- Location: 537 Mountain Road, West Hartford, Connecticut, United States
- Coordinates: 41°46′50″N 72°45′59″W
- Area: 1.6 acres (0.65 ha)
- Built: 1790
- Architectural style: Colonial
- MPS: Eighteenth-Century Houses of West Hartford TR
- NRHP reference No.: 86001990
- Added to NRHP: September 10, 1986

The Samuel Farnsworth House is a historic house at 537 Mountain Road in West Hartford, Connecticut, United States. Probably built about 1797, it is one of West Hartford's few surviving 18th-century buildings, and a particularly rare example of a small vernacular single-story cottage. The house was listed on the National Register of Historic Places on September 10, 1986.

== Description and history ==
The Samuel Farnsworth House is located in northwestern West Hartford, on the west side of Mountain Road, a busy local north–south main road. It is set on a rise above the road, the lot fronted by a dry-laid brownstone retaining wall. It is a 1 1/2-story wood-frame structure with a front gable roof and central brick chimney. Its front facade is three bays wide, with two windows placed asymmetrically on either side of the entrance, which is slightly off-center. The rear roof face has a flare, extending the building to the rear, and there is a secondary entrance on the south side. Trim is limited to simple corner boards.

Although the house is placarded 1807, it was probably built in 1797 by Samuel Farnsworth, and is one of the only two-room cottages from the period to survive. The land was acquired by Samuel Farnsworth in 1790 from his father-in-law, Morgan Goodwin. He sold it in 1797, with dwelling and other outbuildings, to Titus Goodwin. The house remained in the Goodwin family for many years.

== See also ==
- National Register of Historic Places listings in West Hartford, Connecticut
