= John Wells Jr. House =

Historic house in Connecticut, United States

- U.S. National Register of Historic Places
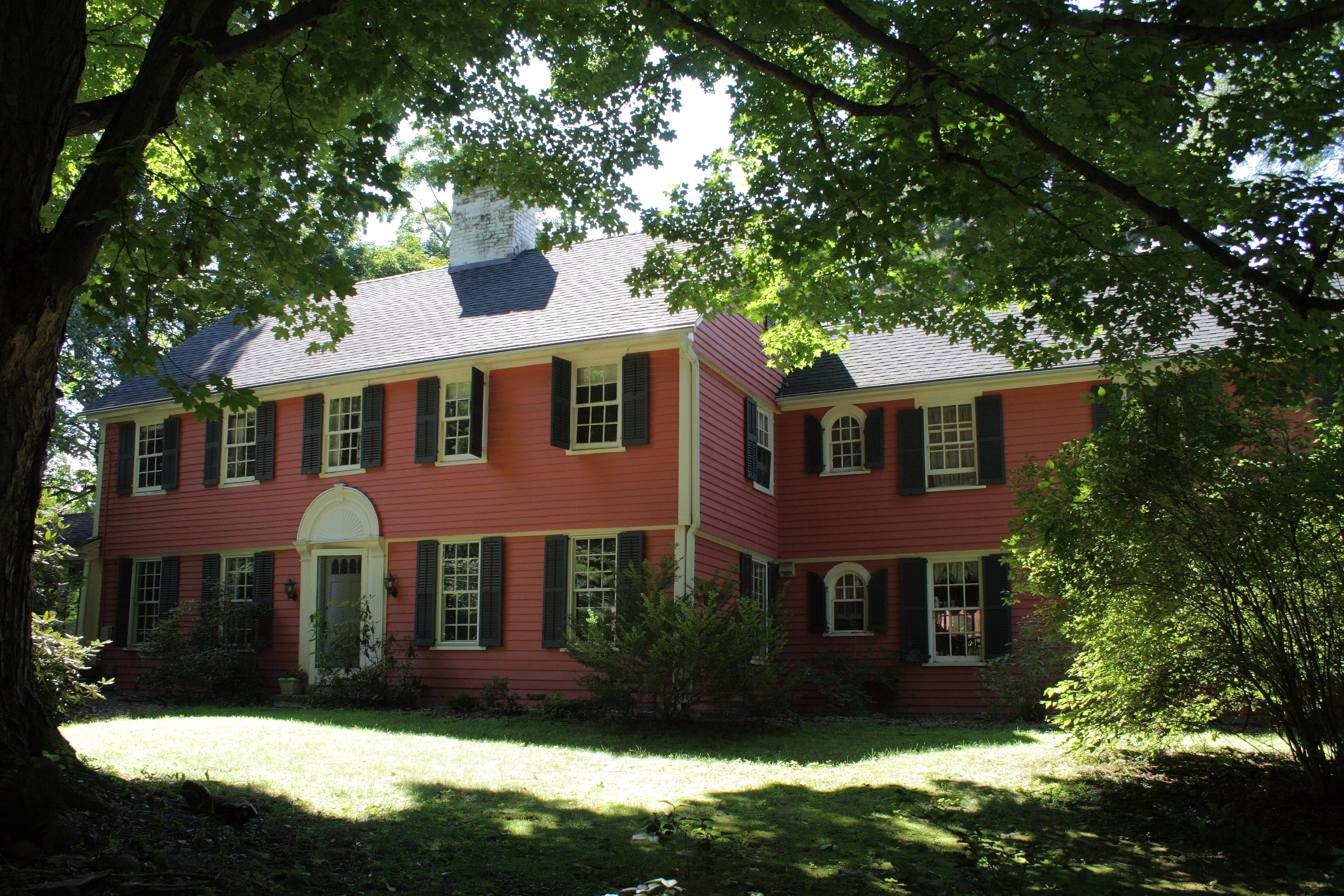
- John Wells Jr. House in 2008

- Location within Connecticut Location within the United States
- Location: 505 Mountain Road, West Hartford, Connecticut
- Coordinates: 41°46′42″N 72°45′59″W
- Area: 6.9 acres (2.8 ha)
- Built: c. 1766
- Architectural style: Colonial
- MPS: Eighteenth-Century Houses of West Hartford TR
- NRHP reference No.: 86002025
- Added to NRHP: September 10, 1986

The John Wells Jr. House is a historic house at 505 Mountain Road in West Hartford, Connecticut. Built about 1766, it is one of the town's few surviving 18th-century buildings, and a good example of Georgian residential architecture. The house was listed on the National Register of Historic Places on September 10, 1986.

== Description and history ==
The John Wells Jr. House is located on the west side of West Hartford, on the west side of Mountain Road, roughly midway between its junctions with Orchard and Flagg Roads. It is set on a lot that rises to the west, with a low stone retaining wall at the front. It is a 2 1/2-story wood-frame structure, five bays wide, with a large central chimney, and a centered entrance. The second floor hangs slightly over the first on the front and sides, and the house is finished in clapboards. The main entrance is flanked by pilasters and topped by a half-round carved fanlight. Two-story ells extend to either side.

The oldest portion of this house was probably built c. 1766 by John Wells Jr. or by his father; the land on which it stands was given by the father to the son, with the house standing on it, in 1768. The house was sold by the younger Wells in 1788. It is one of the oldest houses in West Hartford.

== See also ==
- National Register of Historic Places listings in West Hartford, Connecticut
