= Benjamin Hibbard Residence =

Historic house in Massachusetts, United States

- Hibbard, Benjamin, Residence
- U.S. National Register of Historic Places
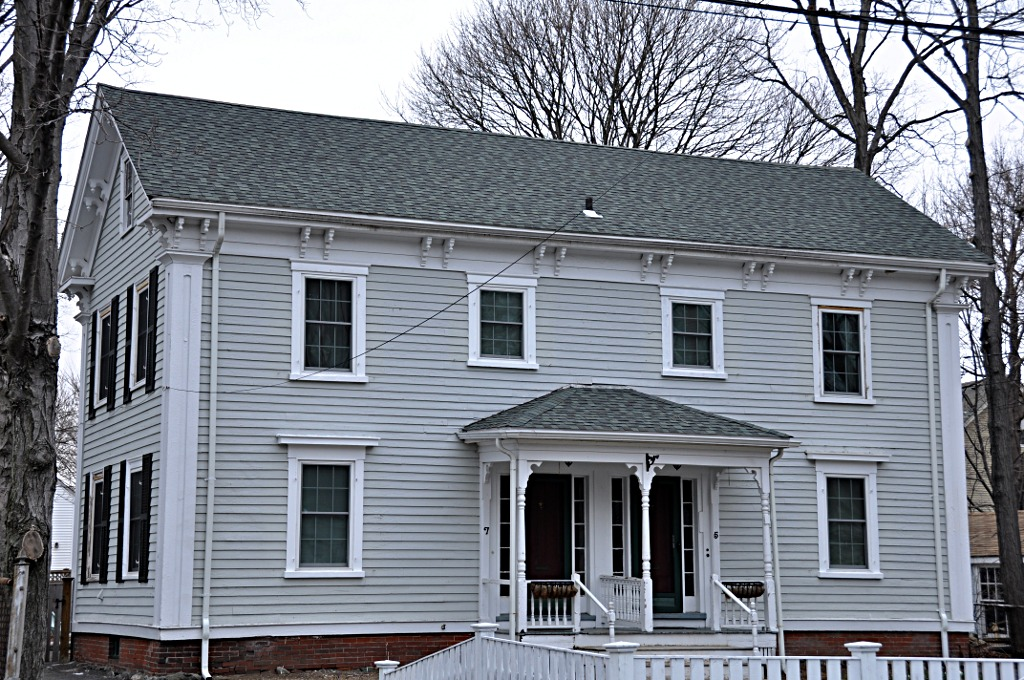

- Location within Massachusetts Location within the United States
- Location: 5-7 Gerry St., Stoneham, Massachusetts
- Coordinates: 42°28′30″N 71°6′1″W
- Built: 1850
- Architectural style: Greek Revival, Italianate
- MPS: Stoneham MRA
- NRHP reference No.: 84002642
- Added to NRHP: April 13, 1984

The Benjamin Hibbard Residence is a historic house at 5-7 Gerry Street in Stoneham, Massachusetts, United States. It is one of a few well-preserved 19th-century double houses in Stoneham. The two-story wood-frame house was built c. 1850, and features double brackets along its cornice, pilastered corners, and a decorated porch covering the twin entrances in the center of the main facade. The house is typical of modest worker residences built at that time. Its only well-documented occupant, Benjamin Hibbard, was a carriage driver in the 1870s and 1880s.

The house was listed on the National Register of Historic Places in 1984.

== See also ==
- John Steele House (Stoneham, Massachusetts), another double house in Stoneham
- National Register of Historic Places listings in Stoneham, Massachusetts
- National Register of Historic Places listings in Middlesex County, Massachusetts
