= James Butler House =

Historic house in Connecticut, United States

- U.S. National Register of Historic Places
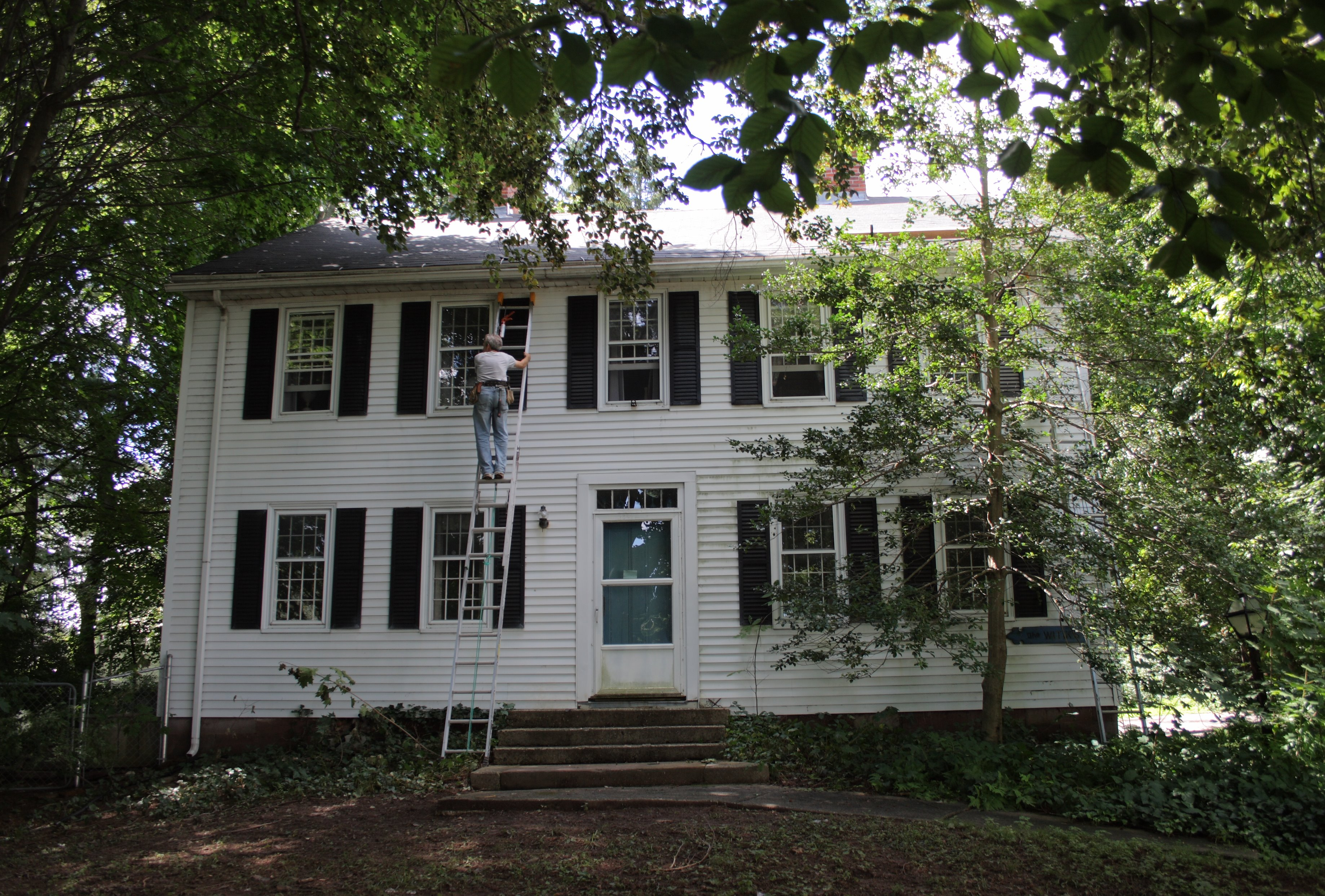

- Location within Connecticut Location within the United States
- Location: 239 North Main Street, West Hartford, Connecticut
- Coordinates: 41°46′40″N 72°44′48″W
- Area: 0.8 acres (0.32 ha)
- Built: 1800
- Architect: Butler, Gideon
- Architectural style: Colonial
- MPS: Eighteenth-Century Houses of West Hartford TR
- NRHP reference No.: 86001987
- Added to NRHP: September 10, 1986

The James Butler House is a historic house a 239 North Main Street in West Hartford, Connecticut. Built about 1800, it is a well-preserved example of transitional Georgian-Federal architecture, and one of the town's older homes. It was listed on the National Register of Historic Places on September 10, 1986.

== Description and history ==
The James Butler House is located in northern West Hartford, on the west side of North Main Street, north of its junction with Hickory Lane. It is set well back from the street, further than the immediately adjacent 20th-century houses. It is a 2 1/2-story wood-frame structure, five bays wide, with two interior chimneys and an exterior finish in aluminum siding. Styling is minimal on the front facade, with shuttered windows and a center entrance topped by a five-light transom window. The interior follows a center hall plan. The fireplace mantel in the main parlor features Georgian style paneling and proportions. A single-story ell extends to the rear; it is possible that it is original to the house's construction.

The house was built either by Gideon or James Butler, sometime between 1789 and 1816. The Butlers, father and son, were descended from Joseph Butler, one of the area's first English settlers. This house remained in the hands of Butler descendants until the 1960s.

== See also ==
- National Register of Historic Places listings in West Hartford, Connecticut
