= West End South Historic District =

Historic district in Connecticut, United States

- U.S. National Register of Historic Places
- U.S. Historic district
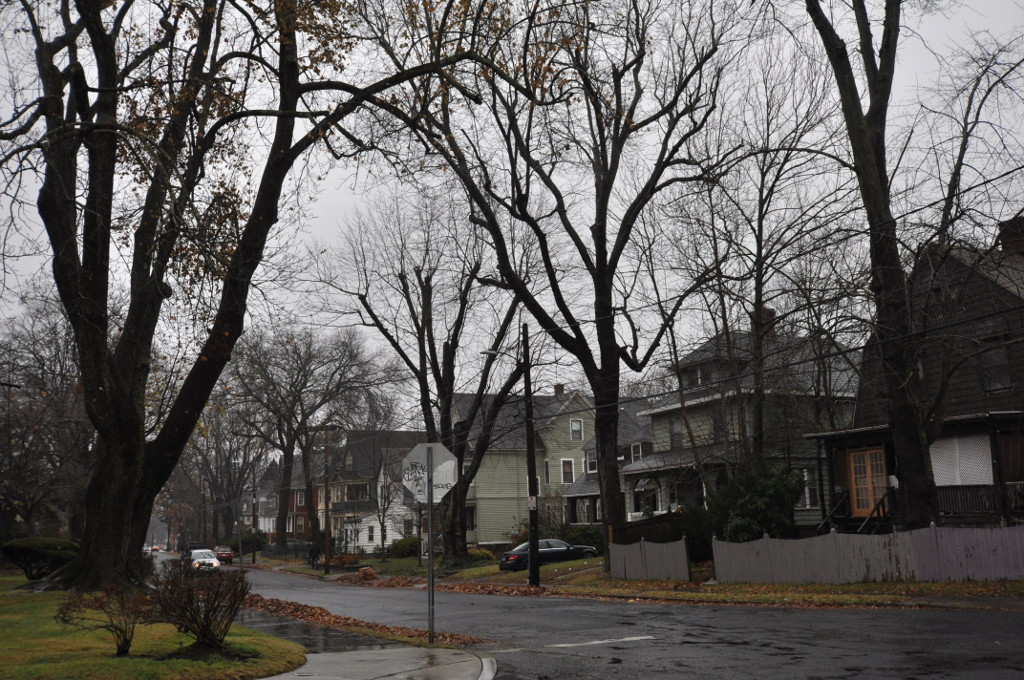

- Location within Connecticut Location within the United States
- Location: Roughly bounded by Farmington Avenue, Whitney and South Whitney Streets, West Boulevard and Prospect Avenue, Hartford and West Hartford
- Coordinates: 41°45′47″N 72°42′52″W
- Area: 46 acres (19 ha)
- Architect: Scoville, William H.; Et al.
- Architectural style: Colonial Revival, Queen Anne, Shingle Style
- NRHP reference No.: 85000763
- Added to NRHP: April 11, 1985

The West End South Historic District encompasses a neighborhood of mid 19th to early 20th century residential architecture in western Hartford, Connecticut and eastern West Hartford, Connecticut. Roughly bounded by Prospect and South Whitney Streets, West Boulevard, and Farmington Avenue, the area includes a large number of Colonial Revival and Queen Anne houses, as well as numerous buildings in other period styles, with only a small number of losses. It was listed on the National Register of Historic Places in 1985.

== Description and history ==
The part of Hartford west of the Park River remained largely agricultural until the 1870s, when it began to see increasing residential development. Most of the land on either side of Farmington Avenue belonged to three owners, including William B. Smith, a Hartford tailor and breeder of cattle. Smith lived in the district's oldest house, a c. 1855 house that has Queen Anne alterations. This area was platted for development in the early 1870s, but financial panics later in the decade delayed substantial development until 1890. In 1889 a streetcar line was extended westward on Farmington Avenue, spurring development. By 1909, much of the area had been developed. Prominent residents of area included Moses Fox, the president of Hartford's leading department store, G. Fox & Co.

The historic district is about 46 acres (19 ha) in size, and includes 177 historically significant buildings. It is bounded on the east by the Park River, and on the south by Farmington Avenue, although it excludes the modern buildings on that road. It is bounded by four transportation arteries, but includes only a few buildings on West Boulevard and Prospect Street, and none on Farmington Avenue or South Whitney Street. The area is characterize by long rectangular blocks, with mature tree plantings and uniform building setbacks. Porches are a regular feature of the houses in the district, regardless of their architectural style. Most buildings are 2-1/2 stories in height, and of wood frame construction. The most common styles seen are the Queen Anne, Shingle, and Colonial Revival, reflecting the period of most intensive development.

== See also ==
- West End North Historic District, across Farmington Avenue to the north
- National Register of Historic Places listings in West Hartford, Connecticut
- National Register of Historic Places listings in Hartford, Connecticut
