= Charles E. Beach House =

Historic house in Connecticut, United States

- U.S. National Register of Historic Places
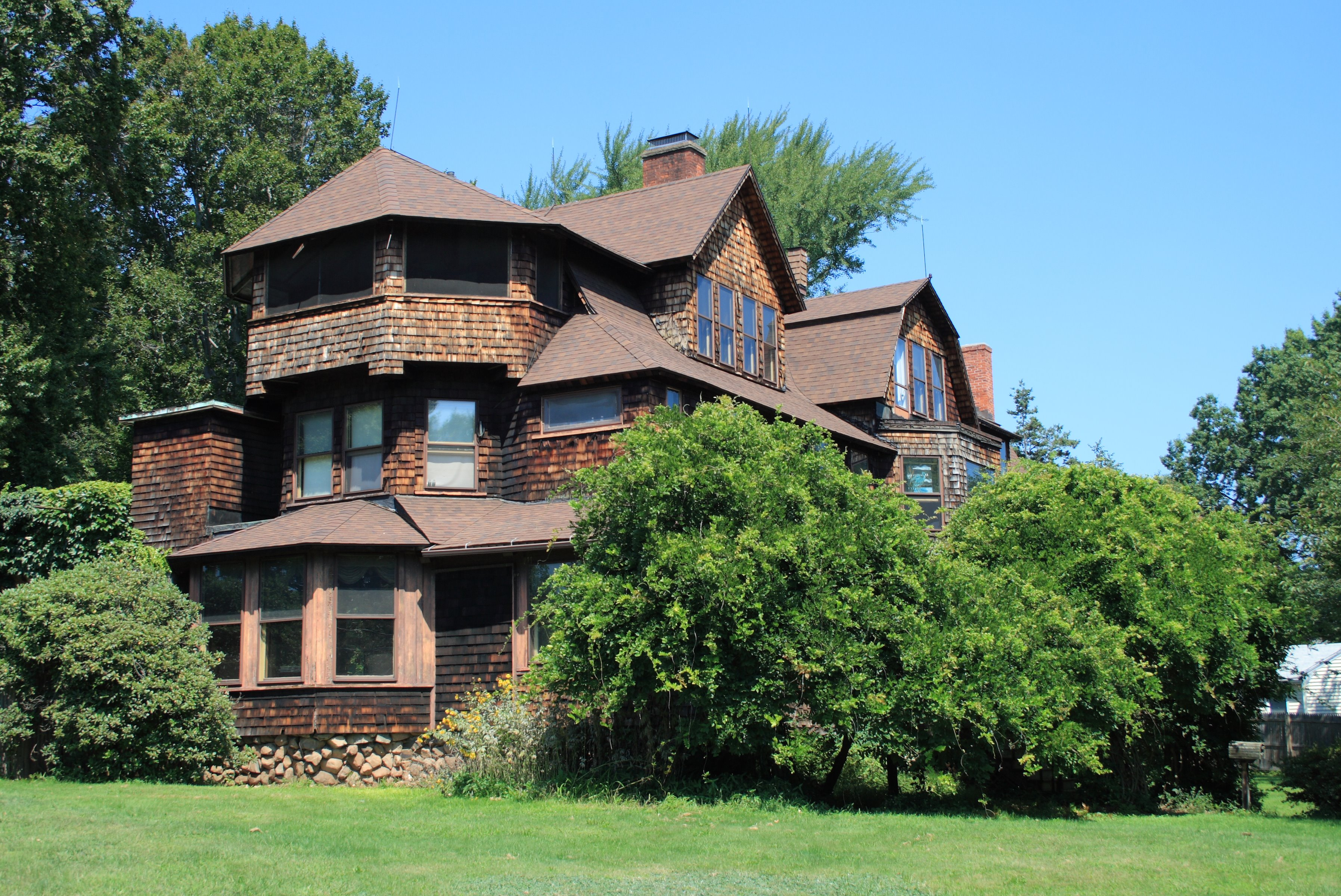

- Location within Connecticut Location within the United States
- Location: 18 Brightwood Lane, West Hartford, Connecticut
- Coordinates: 41°43′58″N 72°44′31″W
- Area: 0.5 acres (0.20 ha)
- Built: 1900
- Architectural style: Shingle Style
- NRHP reference No.: 90001287
- Added to NRHP: August 23, 1990

The Charles E. Beach House is a historic house at 18 Brightwood Lane in West Hartford, Connecticut. Built in 1900–01, it is one of the town's finest examples of Shingle style architecture. It was listed on the National Register of Historic Places on August 23, 1990.

== Description and history ==
The Charles E. Beach House is located in a residential area on West Hartford's south side. It is located on the north side of Brightwood Lane, which is now filled with residential development on the former grounds of the house's once-larger estate. It is a large 2 1/2-story wood-frame structure, with busy asymmetrical massing, including projecting sections and gables. The main roof is pierced by two large dormers, one gabled and the other gambreled, on what is now its primary southeast-facing facade. A single-story porch extends across part of that facade and around to the west. At the western end of the attic level is a polygonal screened porch. The exterior is finished entirely in natural-finish wooden shingles, with trim painted green. A fieldstone porte-cochere is located on the northwest facade, which was the building's original front. The interior, in a marked contrast to the simple finishes of the exterior, is richly decorated.

The house was built in 1900–01 on what the Beach family called Vine Hill, for Charles E. Beach, whose family were an important business and financial family in the Hartford business community. Beach's father had purchased the estate in stages beginning in 1859, and developed it as a dairy farm. Charles E. Beach built this house after the birth of a second son, Thomas C. Beach, along with several surviving outbuildings (now separate residences on Brightwood Lane), and maintained it until his death in 1940. The family then subdivided the property, donating a portion to the town for Beachland Park. West Hartford has three major examples of Shingle architecture, of which this is the best-preserved.

== See also ==
- National Register of Historic Places listings in West Hartford, Connecticut
