= Stanley-Woodruff-Allen House =

Historic house in Connecticut, United States

- U.S. National Register of Historic Places
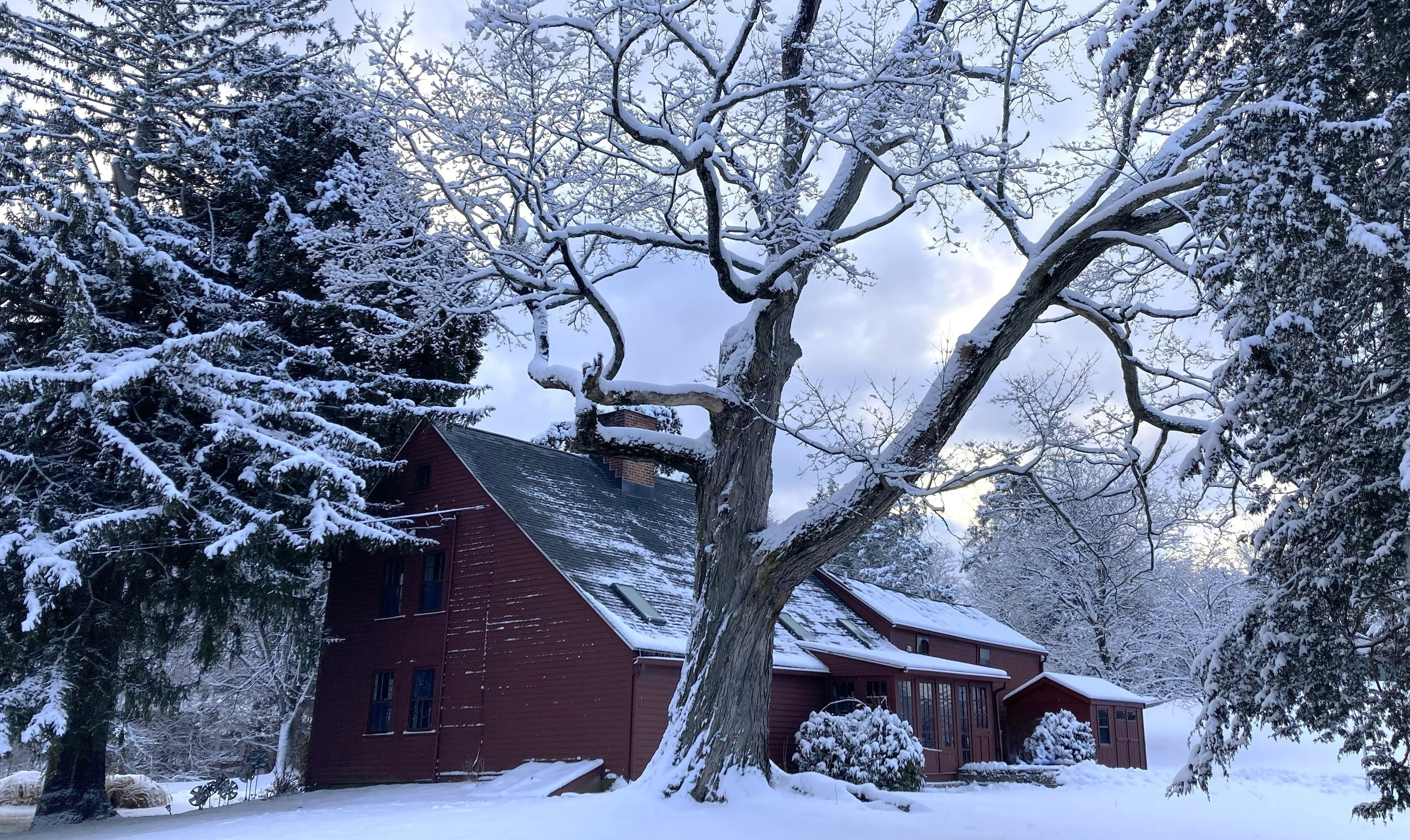

- Location within Connecticut Location within the United States
- Location: 37 Buena Vista Road, West Hartford, Connecticut
- Coordinates: 41°44′58″N 72°46′0″W
- Area: 0.5 acres (0.20 ha)
- Built: 1752
- Architectural style: Colonial
- MPS: Eighteenth-Century Houses of West Hartford TR
- NRHP reference No.: 86002000
- Added to NRHP: September 10, 1986

The Stanley-Woodruff-Allen House is a historic house at 37 Buena Vista Road in West Hartford, Connecticut. Built about 1752, it is one of West Hartford's oldest surviving buildings. It was listed on the National Register of Historic Places in 1986. It is now part of the suite of buildings of the West Hartford Art League.

== Description and history ==
The Stanley-Woodruff-Allen House is located in western West Hartford, on the south side of Buena Vista Road, just east of some of the town's athletic fields and the northern end of the Buena Vista Golf Course. It is set facing east near the road, from which it is screened by mature trees. It is a 2 1/2-story wood-frame structure, with a gabled roof, central chimney, and clapboarded exterior. The main facade is three bays wide, with symmetrical placement of windows around the center entrance. The entrance is sheltered by an enclosed shed-roof portico finished mainly in glass. The interior has been extensively altered for use as an art gallery, but it retains some original features, including window mouldings and one wall of wooden paneling. A shed-roof leanto extends to the rear, giving the building a saltbox profile; it is a later addition.

The house was built about 1752 by Samuel Stanley, the second of that name, for his son, also named Samuel. This was one of the first farmhouses to be built in what later became West Hartford, and is now one of its few remaining 18th-century buildings. The house was purchased by the town in 1943 as a home for the caretaker of the golf course, and was given to the West Hartford Art League in a long-term lease in 1976. The League now uses it as a gallery space aptly called the Saltbox.

== See also ==
- National Register of Historic Places listings in West Hartford, Connecticut
