= Timothy Goodman House =

Historic house in Connecticut, United States

- U.S. National Register of Historic Places
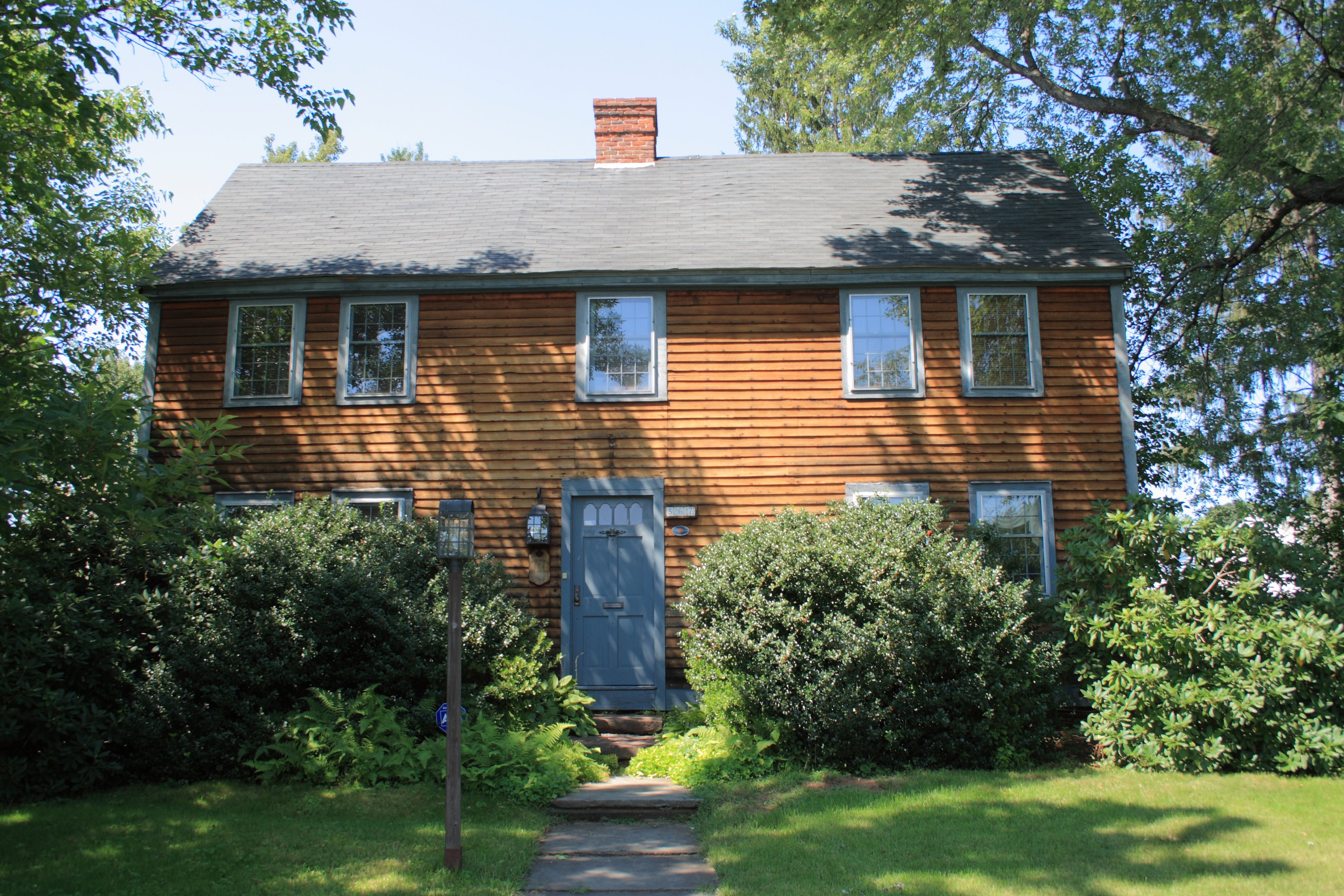

- Location within Connecticut Location within the United States
- Location: 567 Quaker Lane South, West Hartford, Connecticut
- Coordinates: 41°44′42″N 72°43′50″W
- Area: 0.4 acres (0.16 ha)
- Built: 1750
- Architectural style: Colonial
- MPS: Eighteenth-Century Houses of West Hartford TR
- NRHP reference No.: 86001993
- Added to NRHP: September 10, 1986

The Timothy Goodman House is a historic house at 567 Quaker Lane South in West Hartford, Connecticut. Built in the early to mid-18th century, it is one of West Hartford's few surviving 18th-century houses. It was listed on the National Register of Historic Places on September 10, 1986.

== Description and history ==
The Timothy Goodman House stands in southeastern West Hartford, on the west side of Quaker Lane (a busy north–south local artery) just north of its junction with Jackson Avenue. It is a 2 1/2-story wood-frame structure, with a gabled roof and clapboarded exterior. It is five bays wide, with a large central chimney and a rear leanto section, giving it a saltbox appearance. The bays are symmetrically located but not regularly spaced, with wide spaces on either side of the center entrance. The doors, windows, and house corners all have simple trim. The interior includes a number of early 18th-century features, including wood paneled fireplace surrounds, enclosed main beams, and original period doors and door hardware.

The construction date of the house is unclear. Analysis of its roof system suggests a construction date of about 1720, but no house is recorded on deeds for this land until 1778, when Timothy Goodman sold land and dwelling to Isaac and Gideon Webster. Goodman had purchased the land, without dwelling, in 1751 from the grandfather of Noah Webster.

== See also ==
- National Register of Historic Places listings in West Hartford, Connecticut
