= Beardsley-Oliver House =

Historic house in New York, United States

- U.S. National Register of Historic Places
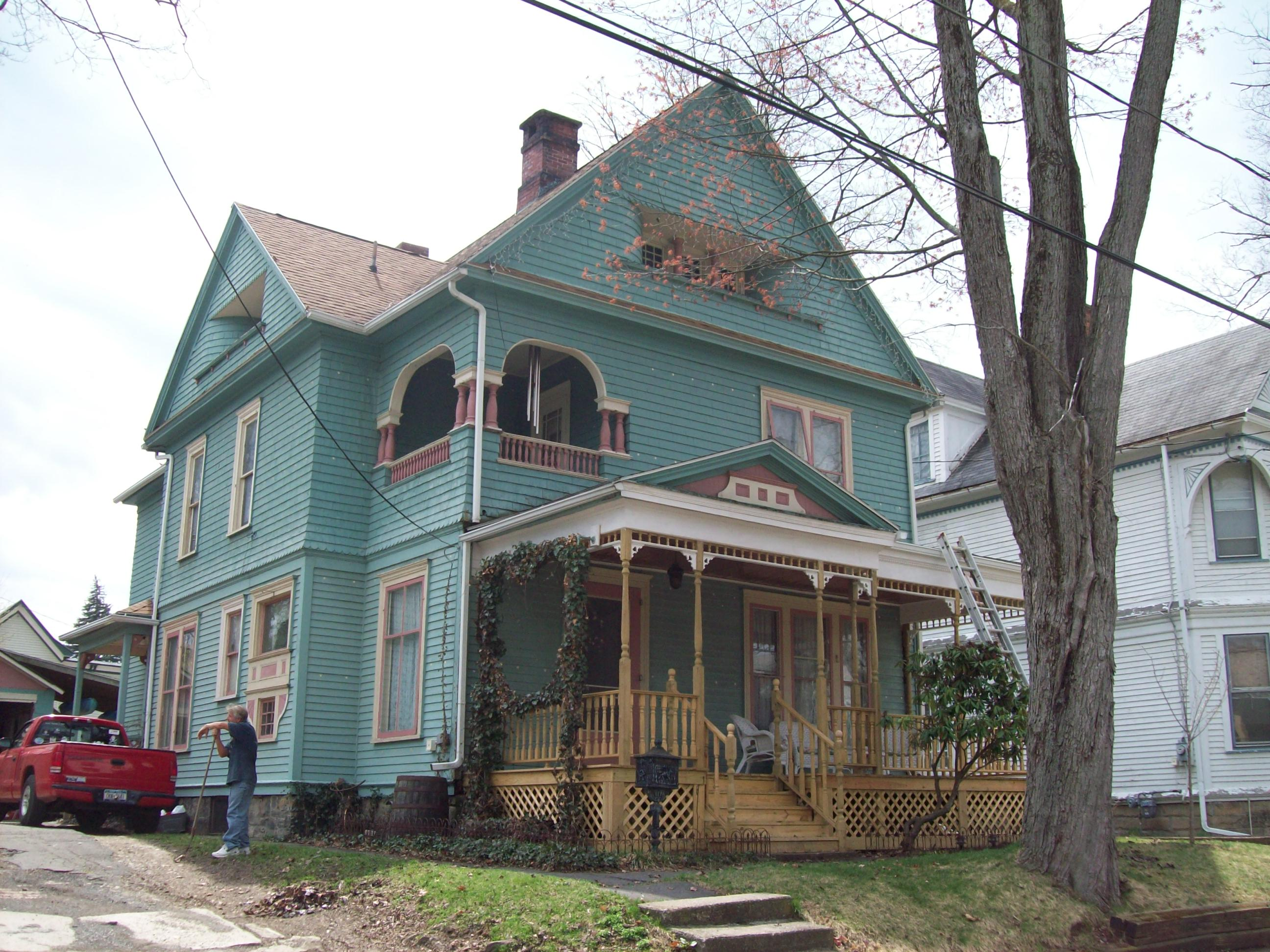
- Beardsley-Oliver House, April 2010

- Location within New York Location within the United States
- Location: 312 Laurel Ave., Olean, New York
- Coordinates: 42°4′42″N 78°25′36″W
- Built: 1890
- Architectural style: Late Victorian, Eclectic
- NRHP reference No.: 08000097
- Added to NRHP: February 28, 2008

The Beardsley-Oliver House is a historic house located at 312 Laurel Avenue in Olean, Cattaraugus County, New York.

== Description and history ==
It is a 2 1/2-story, wood-framed dwelling built in about 1890. It exhibits a late Victorian blending of Shingle Style and Queen Anne styles.

It was listed on the National Register of Historic Places on February 28, 2008.
