= Allyn Steele House =

Historic house in Connecticut, United States

- U.S. National Register of Historic Places
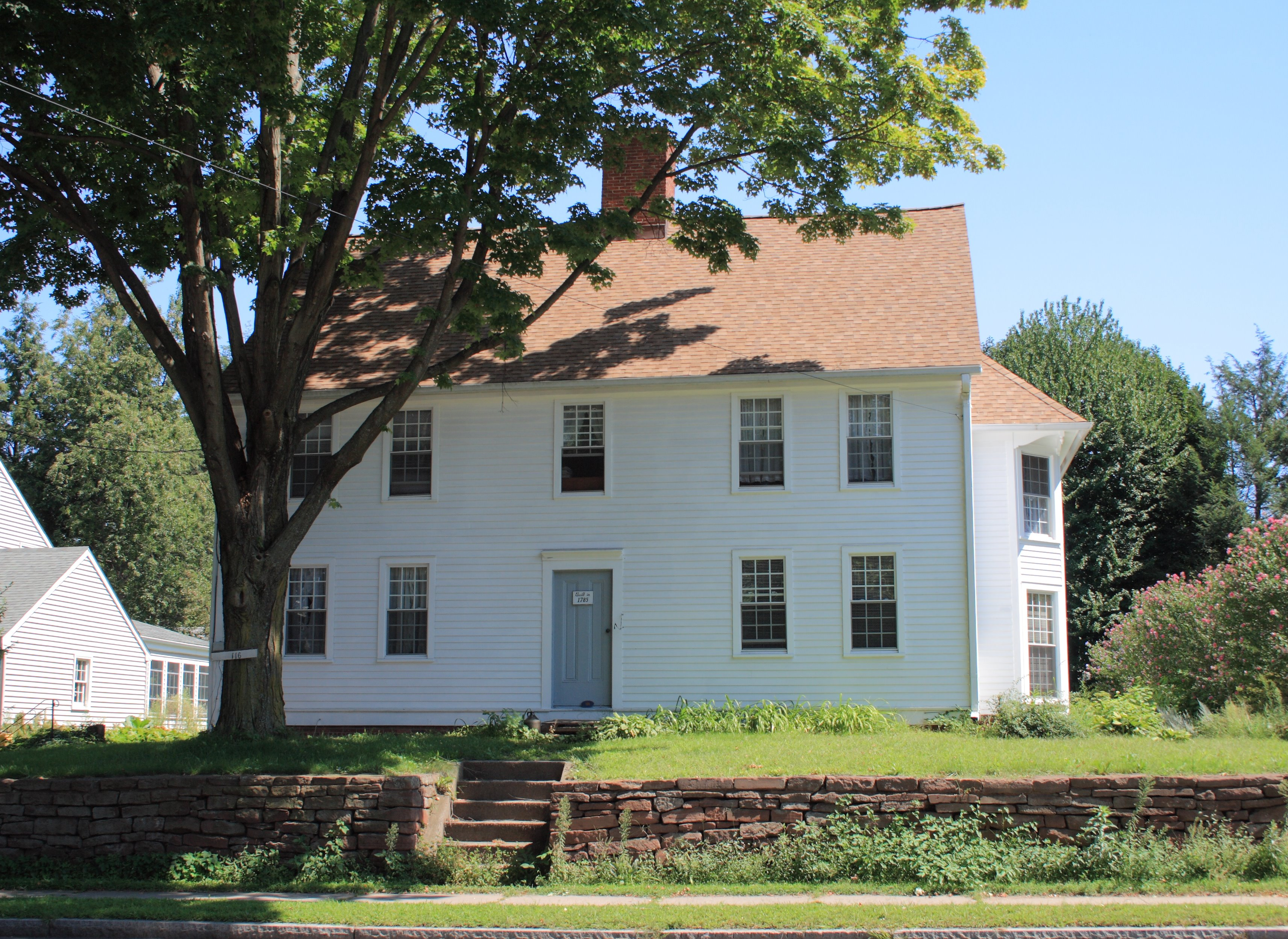

- Location within Connecticut Location within the United States
- Location: 114 North Main Street, West Hartford, Connecticut
- Coordinates: 41°46′11″N 72°44′35″W
- Area: 0.2 acres (0.081 ha)
- Built: 1775
- Architect: Steele, Allyn
- Architectural style: Colonial, Center Chimney Colonial
- MPS: Eighteenth-Century Houses of West Hartford TR
- NRHP reference No.: 86002022
- Added to NRHP: September 10, 1986

The Allyn Steele House is a historic house at 114 North Main Street in West Hartford, Connecticut. Built in 1775, it is one of West Hartford's few surviving 18th-century buildings. It was listed on the National Register of Historic Places in 1986.

== Description and history ==
The Allyn Steele House is located North of the center of West Hartford, on the East Side of North Main Street, North of its Junction with Fern Street. It is set on a lot fringed at the front by a low brownstone retaining wall. It is a 2 1/2-story wood-frame structure, with a side-gable roof, large central chimney and clapboarded exterior. Its main facade is five bays wide, symmetrical in appearance, with the main entrance at the center. The entry is flanked by pilasters and topped by an entablature. A two-story polygonal window bay, probably a 19th-century addition, projects from the right side. The interior retains a number of period features, including the winding staircase at the front, and raised paneling in the front parlor.

The house was built c. 1775 by Allyn Steele, the son of one of West Hartford's early proprietors. It was probably built on the site of an earlier building. It is one of the few surviving 18th-century houses in the town. It was sold out of the Steele family in 1814, and remained the centerpiece of a farm until about 1925.

== See also ==
- National Register of Historic Places listings in West Hartford, Connecticut
