= The Spanish House (West Hartford, Connecticut) =

Historic house in Connecticut, United States

- U.S. National Register of Historic Places
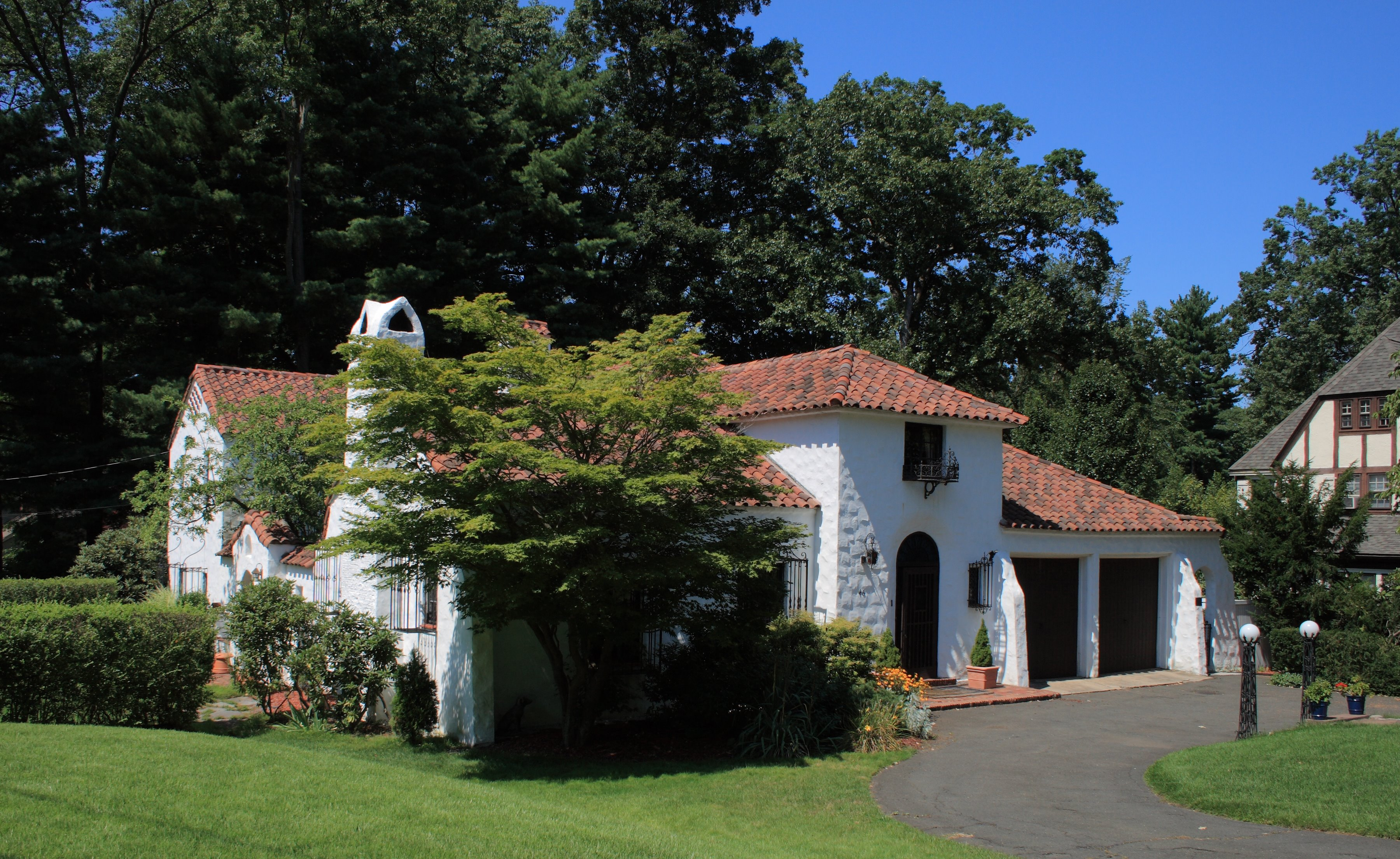

- Location within Connecticut Location within the United States
- Location: 46 Fernwood Road, West Hartford, Connecticut
- Coordinates: 41°46′16″N 72°43′28″W
- Area: less than one acre
- Built: 1928
- Architect: Scheide, Lester B.
- Architectural style: Mission/Spanish Revival
- NRHP reference No.: 79002632
- Added to NRHP: June 14, 1979

The Spanish House is a historic house at 46 Fernwood Road in West Hartford, Connecticut. Built in 1928, it is the only Spanish Colonial Revival house in the town, and a well-preserved and documented exemplar of the style. The house was listed on the National Register of Historic Places on June 14, 1979.

== Description and history ==
The Spanish House is located in a residential area of eastern West Hartford, on the northwest side of a bend in Fernwood Road east of Steele Road. It is a U-shaped 1 1/2-story structure, with the legs running north–south and enclosing a courtyard that is open at the southern end. The walls are masonry finished in stucco, and the roof is red tile. Wrought iron elements accent the exterior, and portions of the interior have painted landscapes and abstract patterns executed by N. Ross Parke, a Hartford artist. A two-car garage, integral to the structure, projects north from the eastern leg of the U, and is accessed via a semicircular drive on the east side of the property.

The house was designed by the Hartford architect Lester Scheide in consultation with his patron, Grace M. Spear Lincoln, a Hartford native who had lived in Spain. The Spanish architectural style exhibited by the house is unique to the period for central Connecticut. The house was built in 1928, Fernwood Road having been platted for development in 1925. Interior floor tiles and fountains were imported from Spain. The entire history of the house's design and construction is documented through sketches, plans, and bills.

== See also ==
- National Register of Historic Places listings in West Hartford, Connecticut
