= Beardsley–Mix House =

Historic house in Connecticut, United States

- U.S. National Register of Historic Places
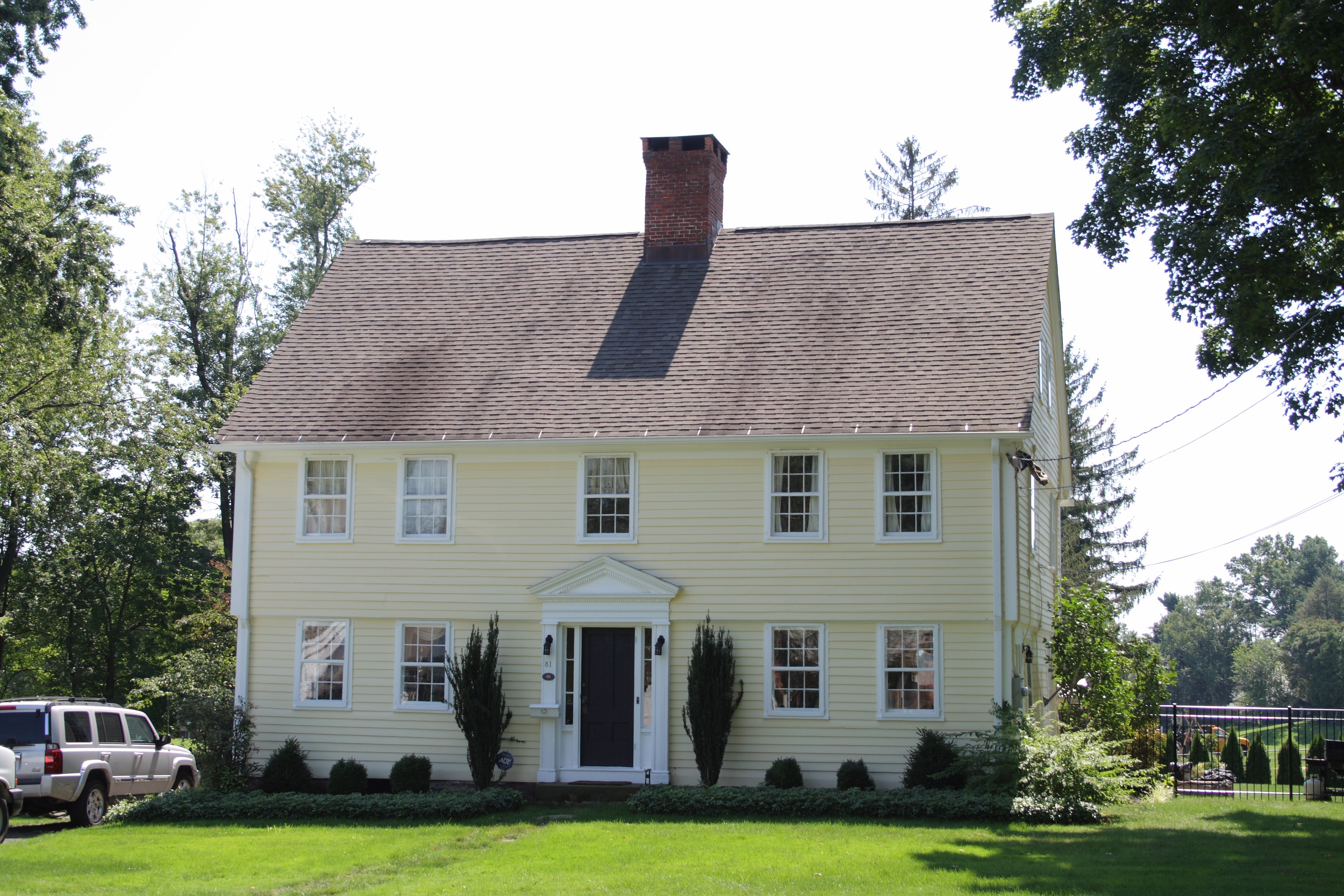

- Location within Connecticut Location within the United States
- Location: 81 Rockledge Drive, West Hartford, Connecticut
- Coordinates: 41°44′41″N 72°44′38″W
- Area: 0.6 acres (0.24 ha)
- Built: 1775
- Architectural style: Colonial, Center Chimney Colonial
- MPS: Eighteenth-Century Houses of West Hartford TR
- NRHP reference No.: 86001980
- Added to NRHP: September 10, 1986

The Beardsley–Mix House is a historic house at 81 Rockledge Drive in West Hartford, Connecticut. Built about 1774, it is one of the town's few surviving 18th-century buildings. It was originally located on South Main Street, and was moved to its present location in the 1930s. It was listed on the National Register of Historic Places in 1986.

== Description and history ==
The Beardsley–Mix House stands on the south side of Rockledge Drive, a residential street just east of South Main Street and south of downtown West Hartford. It is a 2 1/2-story wood-frame structure, with a side-gable roof, central chimney, and clapboarded exterior. Its main facade faces north, and is five bays wide, with a slightly overhanging second story. The centered entry is flanked by sidelight windows and pilasters, which support an entablature and gabled pediment.

This house was probably built c. 1774, on land that was transferred in that year from Noah Webster Sr. (father to the famous Noah Webster, Jr.) to Adam Webster. It and the associated farmland were bought in 1810 by Elisha Mix, who later sold it to Jeremiah Beardslee. After Beardslee died, the property passed to his son-in-law, Henry Mix. The farmland was subdivided in the 1930s, the house moved back from South Main Street to its present location around that time. It is one of West Hartford's few remaining 18th-century houses.

== See also ==
- National Register of Historic Places listings in West Hartford, Connecticut
