= Noah Webster House =

Historic house in Connecticut, United States

- Noah Webster Birthplace
- U.S. National Register of Historic Places
- U.S. National Historic Landmark
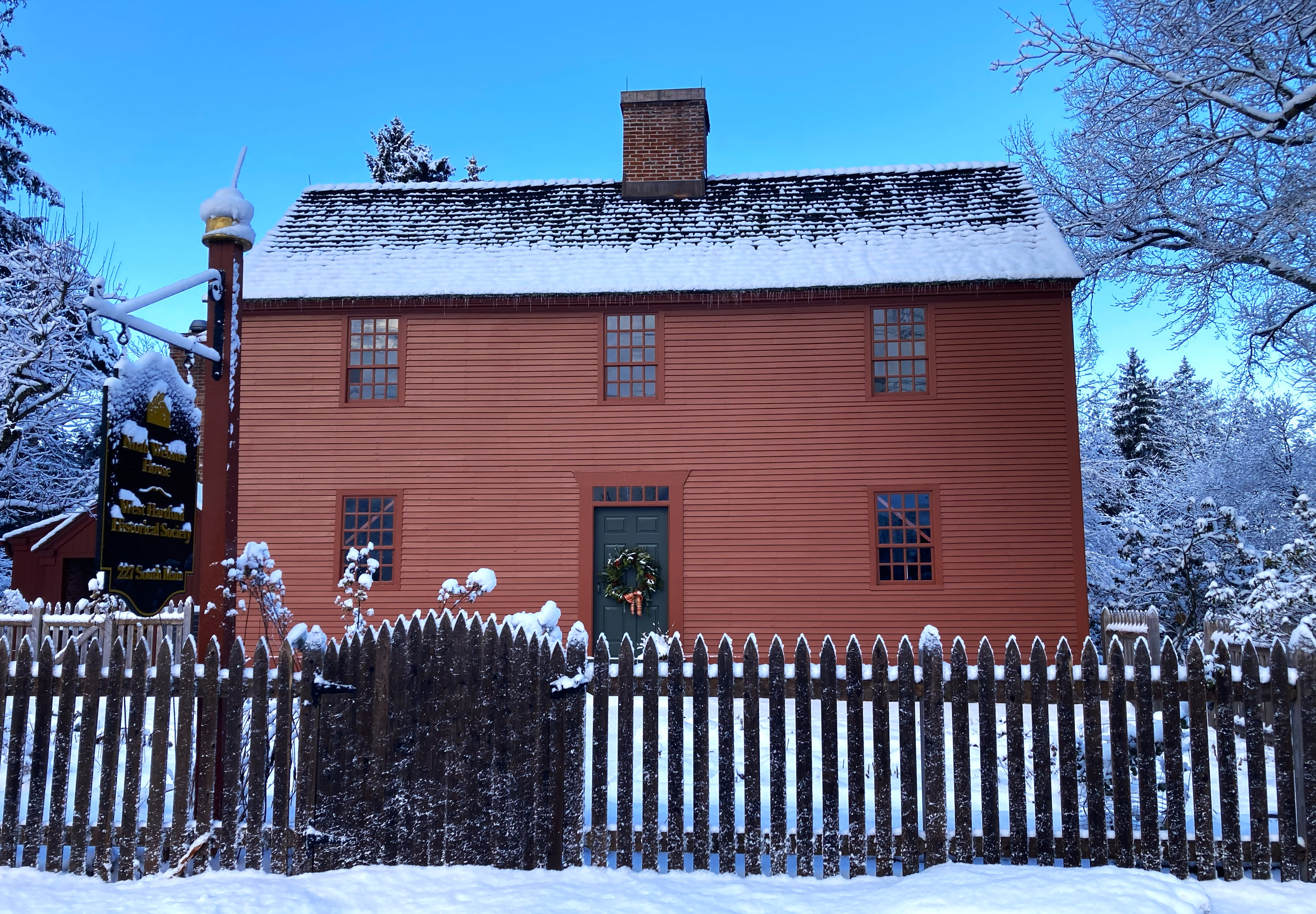

- Location within Connecticut Location within the United States
- Location: 227 South Main Street, West Hartford, Connecticut
- Coordinates: 41°44′46.27″N 72°44′47.4″W
- Built: 1747
- NRHP reference No.: 66000886

Significant dates
- Added to NRHP: October 15, 1966
- Designated NHL: December 29, 1962

The Noah Webster House is a historic house museum located at 227 South Main Street, West Hartford, Connecticut. It was the boyhood home of American lexicographer Noah Webster (Junior, 1758–1853), and was declared a National Historic Landmark in 1962.

== Description and history ==
The main portion of the Webster House is a 2 1/2-story wood-frame structure, three bays wide, with a large central chimney and center entrance. The most recent architectural survey (2013) demonstrates evidence inside the main fireplace of the hand of Daniel Webster (either the father of Noah Webster Sr, or the uncle) as the person who built the house, and who lived across the road. His name is evident, signed with a finger in the yet-to-harden masonry. A dendrochronology study was conducted in 2024 which definitively confirms that the house was built in 1747. As part of a 120-acre (49 ha) farm, and is a typical frame residence of that era. A single-story brick addition was added to the house at an early date, probably to house a kitchen, and a wood-frame ell was also eventually added to the rear. A modern museum addition, roughly in the shape of a barn, was added in the 1970s after the property was rehabilitated and prepared for use as a museum.

In 1758 the house was the birthplace of Noah Webster. His father mortgaged the farm, including this farmhouse, for Noah to attend Yale College. Webster returned to the house after graduation, and was engaged as a teacher at local schools. His interest in lexicography prompted a series of publications, beginning with a spelling book in 1783 and culminating in the publication in 1828 of his Dictionary of the American Language, which sold millions of copies during his lifetime, and laid down basic principles for dictionaries and spelling books that are still used today.

The house was continuously occupied as a private residence until 1962, when it was given to the town. In 1966 it opened as a museum. It currently contains several items with Webster associations, including early editions of the Dictionary of the American Language and Blue-backed Spellers, as well as china, glassware, a desk, and two clocks that Webster owned as an adult.

The house also serves as the headquarters of the West Hartford Historical Society.

Guests can visit the museum, which is open Monday-Saturday from 1:00pm-4:00pm. More information can be found at the museum's website: www.noahwebsterhouse.org.

== See also ==
- List of National Historic Landmarks in Connecticut
- National Register of Historic Places listings in West Hartford, Connecticut
