= John Steele House (Stoneham, Massachusetts) =

Historic house in Massachusetts, United States

- U.S. National Register of Historic Places
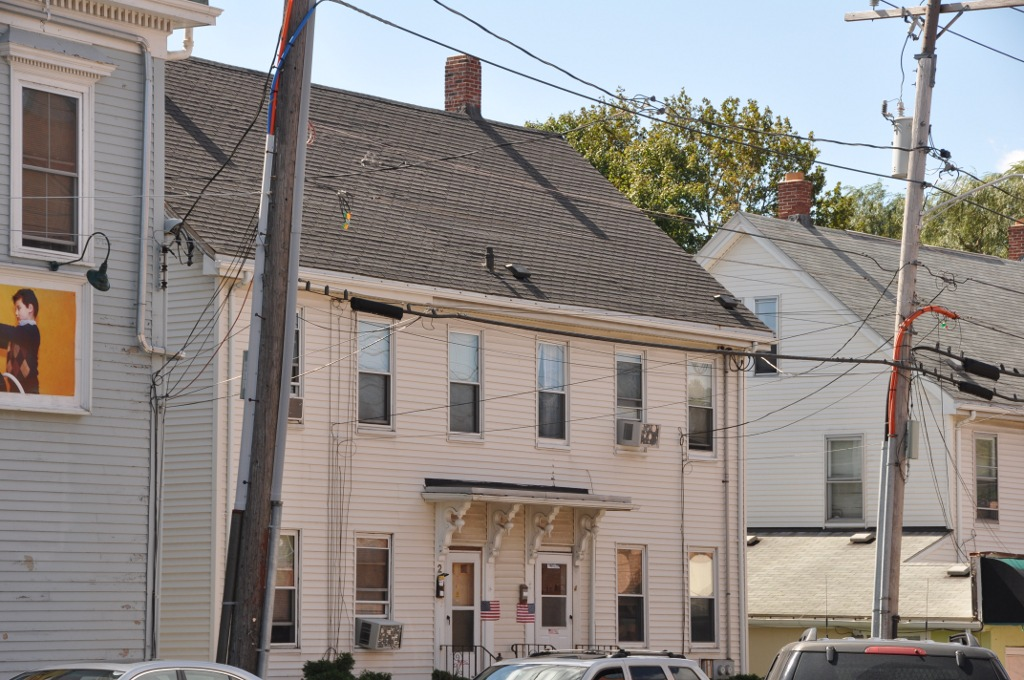

- Location within Massachusetts Location within the United States
- Location: 2–4 Montvale Avenue, Stoneham, Massachusetts
- Coordinates: 42°28′54″N 71°6′4″W
- Built: 1880
- Architectural style: Italianate
- MPS: Stoneham MRA
- NRHP reference No.: 84002829
- Added to NRHP: April 13, 1984

The John Steele House is a historic house at 2–4 Montvale Avenue in Stoneham, Massachusetts. It is one of a few surviving 19th-century double houses in Stoneham. Built c. 1880–1885, It is a 6-bay two-story wood-frame house, with a side-gable roof, chimneys at the ends, and twin doors in the central bays under a shared bracketed hood. It is one of a series of identical rowhouses that were owned by John Steele, a major landowner in the town during that period.

The house was listed on the National Register of Historic Places in 1984.

== See also ==
- Benjamin Hibbard Residence, another double house in Stoneham
- National Register of Historic Places listings in Stoneham, Massachusetts
- National Register of Historic Places listings in Middlesex County, Massachusetts
