= West End North Historic District =

Historic district in Connecticut, United States

- U.S. National Register of Historic Places
- U.S. Historic district
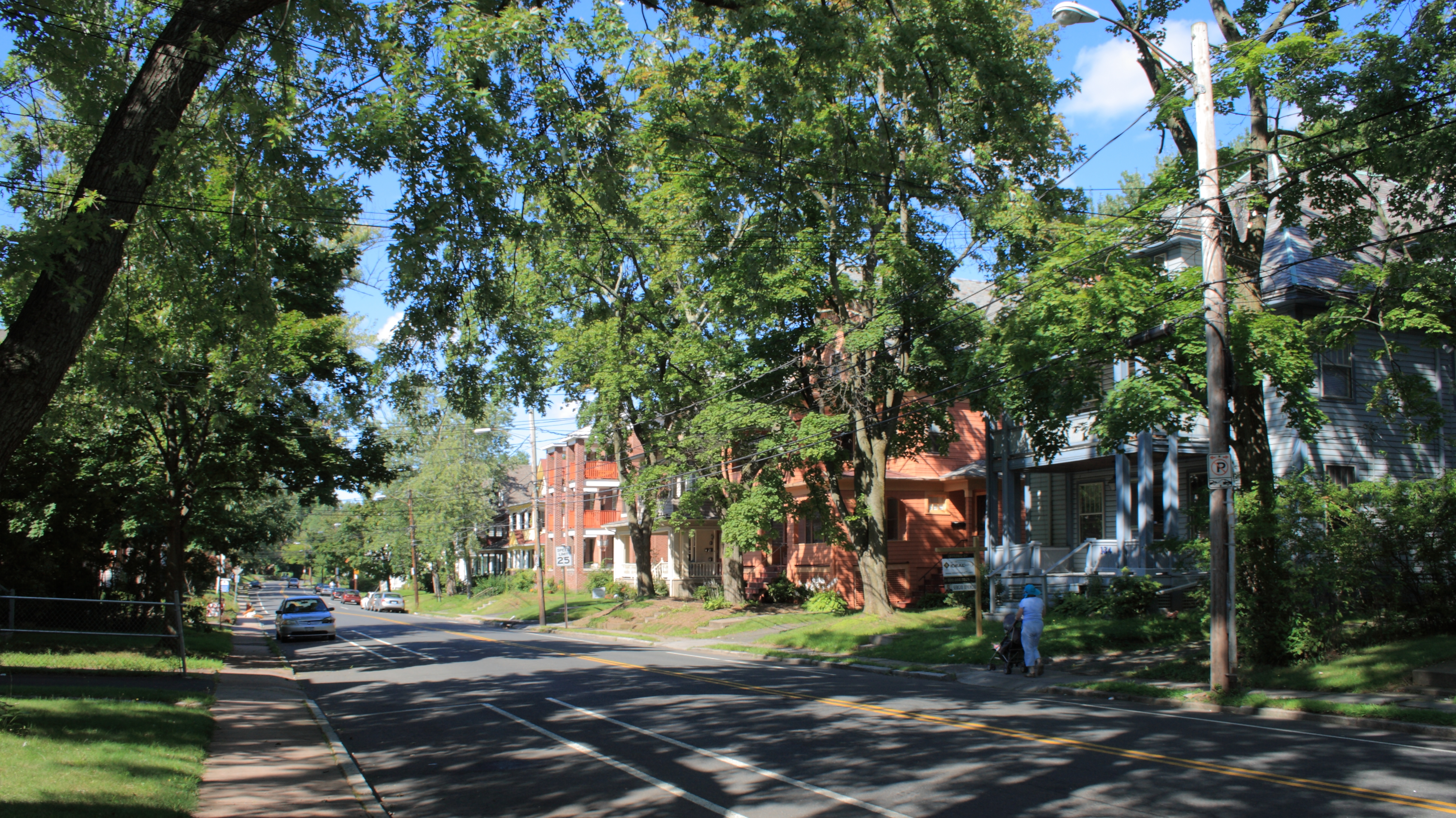
- Whitney Street

- Location within Connecticut Location within the United States
- Location: Roughly bounded by Farmington Avenue, Lorraine, Elizabeth, and Prospect Streets, Hartford and West Hartford, Connecticut
- Coordinates: 41°46′9″N 72°42′44″W
- Area: 120 acres (49 ha)
- Architectural style: Late 19th And 20th Century Revivals, Late Victorian, Eclectic
- NRHP reference No.: 85001618
- Added to NRHP: July 25, 1985

The West End North Historic District encompasses a neighborhood of late 19th and early 20th century residential architecture in western Hartford, Connecticut and eastern West Hartford, Connecticut. Roughly bounded by Prospect, Elizabeth, and Lorraine Streets and Farmington Avenue, the area includes a large number of Colonial Revival and Queen Anne houses, as well as numerous buildings in other period styles, with only a small number of losses. It was listed on the National Register of Historic Places in 1985.

== Description and history ==
The part of Hartford west of the Park River remained largely agricultural until the 1870s, when it began to see increasing residential development. Most of the land on either side of Farmington Avenue belonged to three owners, including Eugene Kenyon, a Hartford businessman. He platted the subdivision of his land and that of Sylvanus Cone for residential development, an area including the southern half of this district. It saw only modest development during the 1870s owing to financial uncertainties of the period, and it was not until the 1880s that more significant development took place. In 1886-87 a series of handsome Queen Anne Victorians were built along Girard Avenue. The most intensive development took place in the first decade of the 20th century, when a significant number of Colonial Revival houses were built throughout the district. Most of this development was targeted at middle to upper-class residents working in downtown Hartford.

The historic district is about 120 acres (49 ha) in size, and includes 291 historically significant buildings. It is bounded on the east by the Park River, and on the south by Farmington Avenue, although it excludes the modern buildings on that road. It is bounded on the west by Prospect Street, including properties on the west side (in West Hartford) and the east side (in Hartford). To the north it is bounded by Elizabeth Street, including only buildings on the south side, and by the campus of the University of Connecticut School of Law (which is excluded from this district, but is separately listed on the National Register).

== See also ==
- National Register of Historic Places listings in Hartford, Connecticut
- National Register of Historic Places listings in West Hartford, Connecticut
