= Sarah Whitman Hooker House =

Historic house in Connecticut, United States

- U.S. National Register of Historic Places
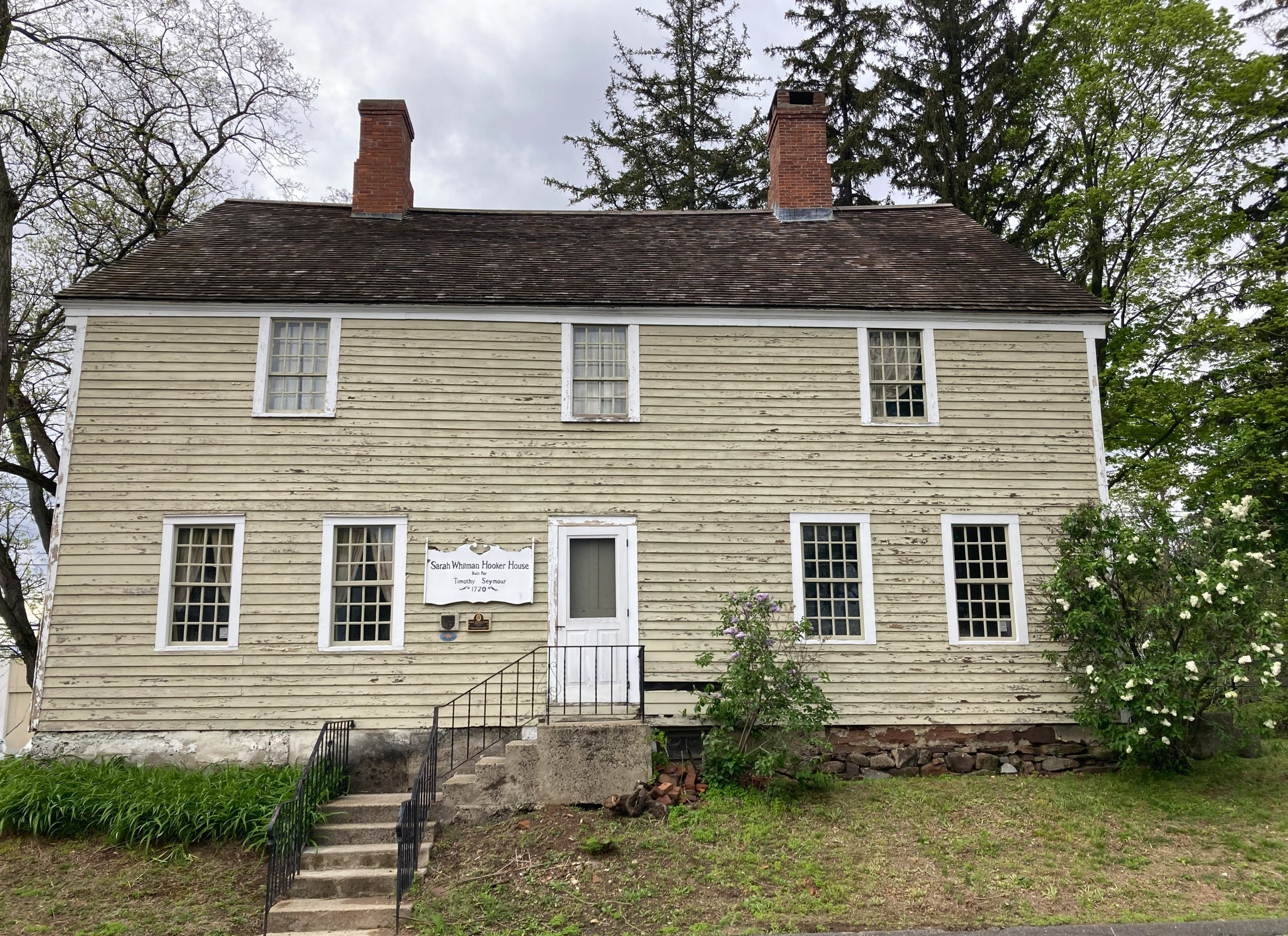
- South side of the house (April 2026)

- Location within Connecticut Location within the United States
- Location: 1237 New Britain Avenue, West Hartford, Connecticut
- Coordinates: 41°43′53″N 72°44′35″W
- Area: less than one acre
- Built: 1720
- Architectural style: Colonial, Georgian
- NRHP reference No.: 79002627
- Added to NRHP: November 1, 1979

The Sarah Whitman Hooker House is a historic house at 1237 New Britain Avenue in West Hartford, Connecticut. Built about 1720, it is believed to be the oldest standing house in the town. It was listed on the National Register of Historic Places on November 1, 1979.

== Description and history ==
The Sarah Whitman Hooker House is located in southern West Hartford, on the south side of New Britain Avenue (Connecticut Route 71), just east of its junction with South Main Street. It is a 2 1/2-story wood-frame structure, five bays wide, with two interior chimneys and a centered entrance. It is set at the busy southeast corner of New Britain Avenue and South Main Street. The main entrance is flanked by sidelight windows and framed by a molded surround.

The house was built c. 1720, and originally had a central chimney. It was built by John Seymour in what was one of the first areas of Hartford's West Parish to be settled. It underwent a major renovation in the early 19th century, at which time that chimney was removed, and the attic and rear lean-to spaces were rebuilt. The interior suffered fire damage in 1935, but this has since been restored.

In addition to its age, the house is notable locally for its role in the American Revolutionary War, when the house was owned by Thomas Hart Hooker, a descendant of Hartford's founder Thomas Hooker, and his wife Sarah Whitman Hooker. The Hookers held as captives Andrew and Philip Skene, Loyalists who were taken prisoner early in the American Revolutionary War by colonial forces that captured Fort Ticonderoga in upstate New York and ransacked the elder Skene's house.

The house is presently owned by the town.

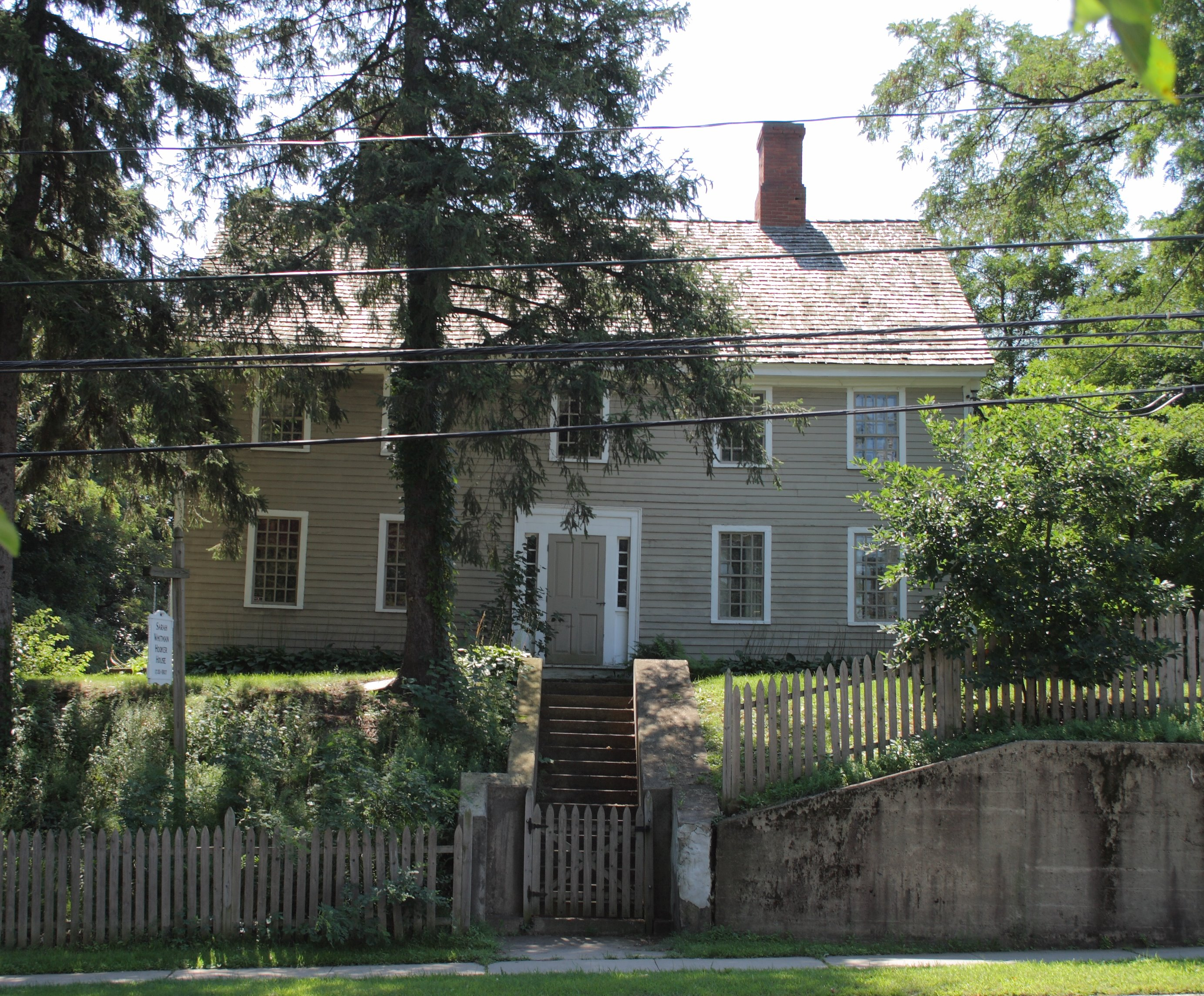
North side of the house, facing New Britain Avenue (August 2008)

== See also ==
- National Register of Historic Places listings in Hartford County, Connecticut
