= John Steele House (Salisbury, North Carolina) =

Historic house in North Carolina, United States

- U.S. National Register of Historic Places
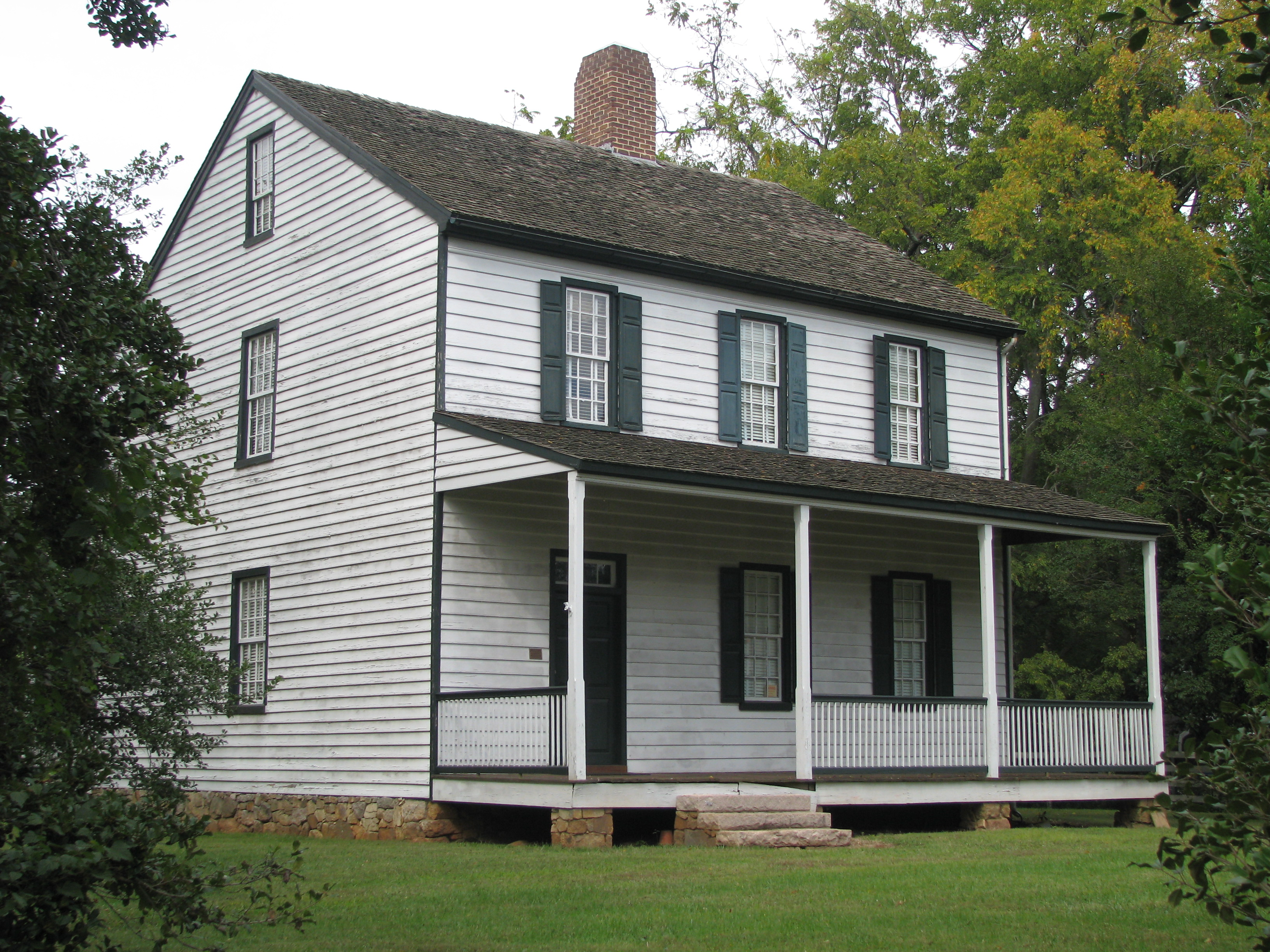
- John Steele House, September 2012

- Location within North Carolina Location within the United States
- Location: 1010 Richard St., Salisbury, North Carolina
- Coordinates: 35°40′27″N 80°27′31″W
- Area: 1 acre (0.40 ha)
- Built: c. 1799-1801
- Built by: Sharpe, Elam; Langdon, John
- Architectural style: Federal
- NRHP reference No.: 94001051
- Added to NRHP: September 12, 1994

John Steele House, also known as Lombardy, is a historic plantation house in Salisbury, Rowan County, North Carolina. It was built between 1799 and 1801 and is a two-story, three-bay, side hall plan, Federal style frame dwelling. It has a side gable roof and a one-story shed roof porch and is sheathed with beaded weatherboards. The house was restored between 1977 and 1983. It was the home of North Carolina politician John Steele (1764-1815).

It was listed on the National Register of Historic Places in 1994.
