= South Green Historic District (Hartford, Connecticut) =

- U.S. National Register of Historic Places
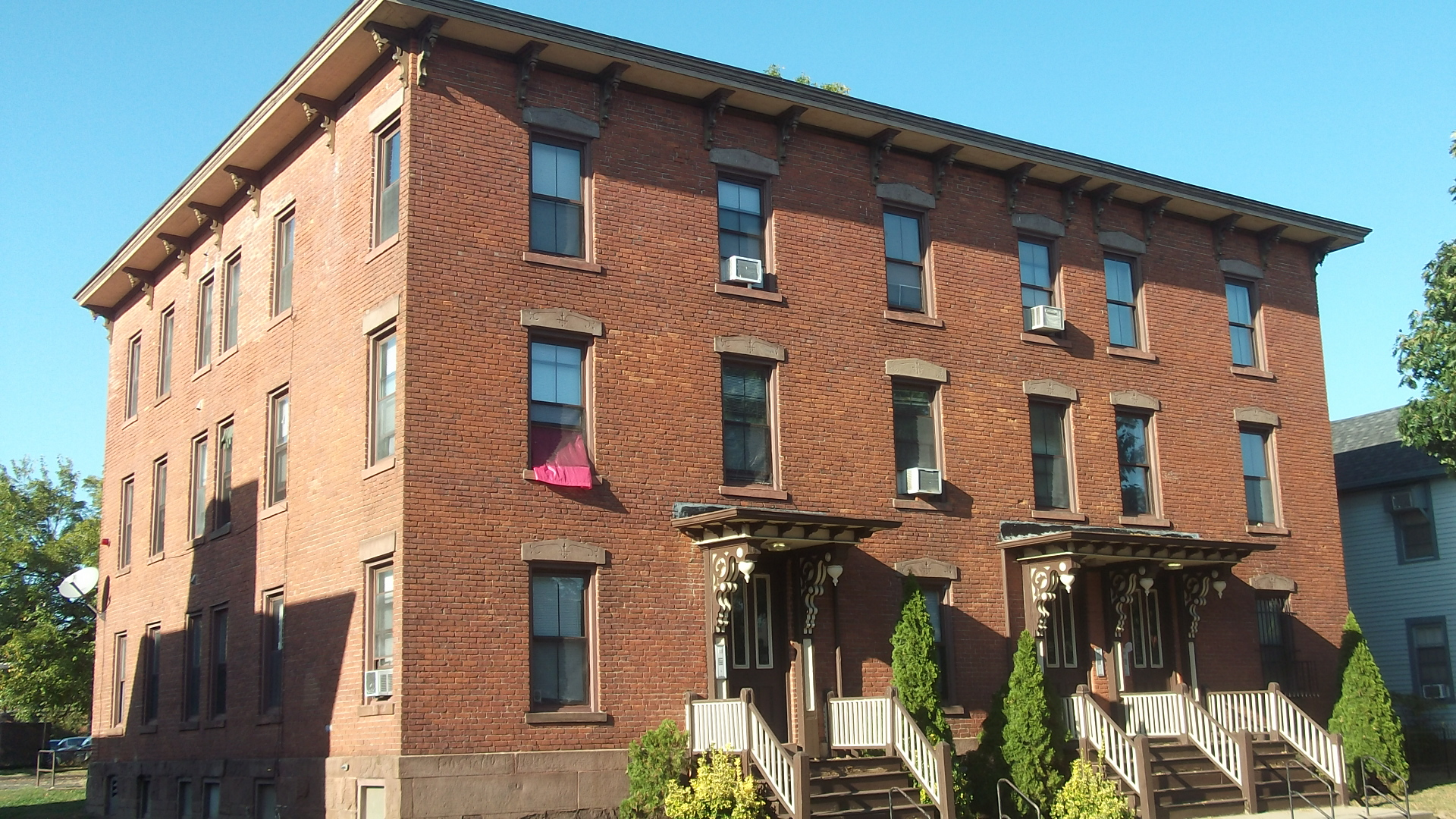
- 40 Alden Street

- Location within Connecticut Location within the United States
- Location: Roughly, along Wethersfield Avenue, Alden and Morris Streets, Hartford, Connecticut
- Coordinates: 41°45′8″N 72°40′32″W
- Area: 26 acres (11 ha)
- NRHP reference No.: 02001453
- Added to NRHP: November 17, 1977

The South Green Historic District encompasses a predominantly 19th-century residential area near the South Green of Hartford, Connecticut. This area features a variety of residences in both high and common styles, from the elaborate home of armsmaker Samuel Colt to multi-unit apartment houses, many of which were built between about 1860 and 1900. The district is roughly triangular, extending from South Green along Main Street and Wethersfield Avenue to include Morris, Dean, and Alden Streets. The district was listed on the National Register of Historic Places in 1977.

== Description and history ==
What is now the South Green, South of Downtown Hartford at Main Street and Maple Avenue, was allocated as common pasture land by the city in 1642. The home of early political leader George Wyllys stood nearby, and that family's prominence in the area gave Wyllys Street (the southern boundary of the green) its name. In 1850, Solomon Porter led a push to increase development in this area, and in 1854 the city boundary (originally at Wyllys Street) was moved south. Wethersfield Avenue was built with large Italianate homes, mainly in brick, for wealthier buyers, while the side streets were built out with more modest single and multifamily residences. Most of the construction in the early 20th century was apartment blocks; one of these was designed by George Dunkelberger, the designer of the bridges on the Merritt Parkway, and exhibits a similar flair for the whimsical. Non-residential buildings in the district include three churches, a small number of commercial buildings, and a modest number of small light industrial buildings.

The district is bordered by three other historic districts: the Colt Industrial District to the east, Charter Oak Place to the north, and Congress Street to the west. Previously listed properties within the district include Armsmear, the National Historic Landmark home of armsmaker Samuel Colt, the Henry Barnard House, home to 19th-century educator Henry Barnard and also a National Historic Landmark, and the Day-Taylor House.

== See also ==
- National Register of Historic Places listings in Hartford, Connecticut
