= Hartford Botanical Garden =

Botanical garden planned for Hartford, Connecticut

Coordinates: 41.7553°N 72.674°W

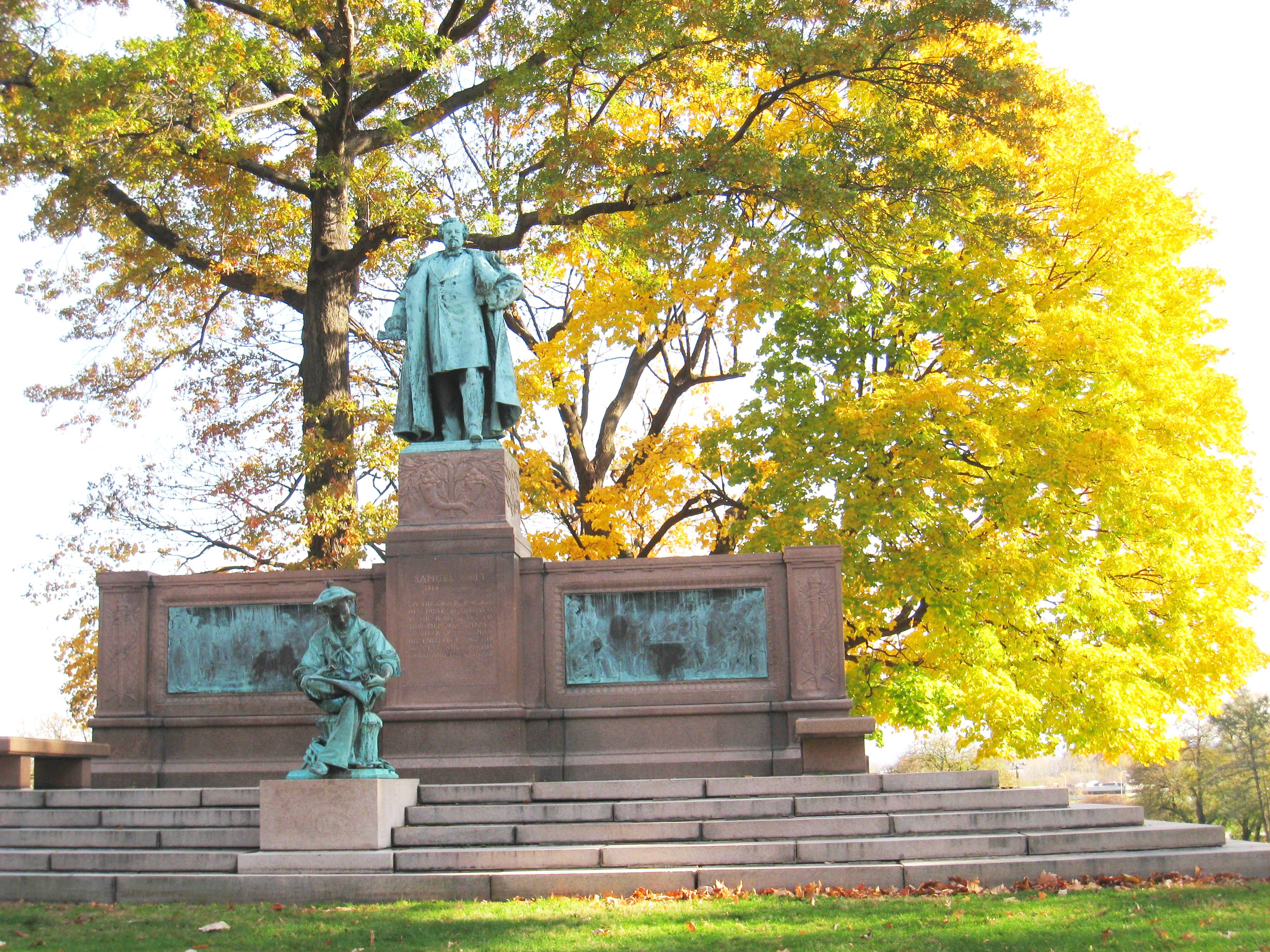
Hartford Botanical Garden

The Hartford Botanical Garden is a botanical garden planned for Hartford, Connecticut. The garden is planned to occupy 18 acres (73,000 m^{2}) of Colt Park immediately adjacent to Samuel Colt's Armsmear mansion. First proposed in 1997, little work was done to bring the creation of the park to fruition at that time. By 2005, the idea had been revived in conjunction with the efforts to upgrade the Coltsville Historic District to National Park status. The Hartford City Council allocated $50,000 towards the proposed master planning budget of $150,000.

A total budget of up to $10 million was envisioned and it was hoped that "...a well-conceived and well-run garden would draw 100,000 to 125,000 visitors annually and create or stimulate the creation of 110 jobs." The master plan was completed by local consulting firm TSKPStudio. Interest was renewed when it was included in the 2020 Hartford City Plan.

== See also ==
- List of botanical gardens in the United States
