= James B. Colt House =

Historic house in Connecticut, United States

- U.S. National Register of Historic Places
- U.S. National Historic Landmark District – Contributing property
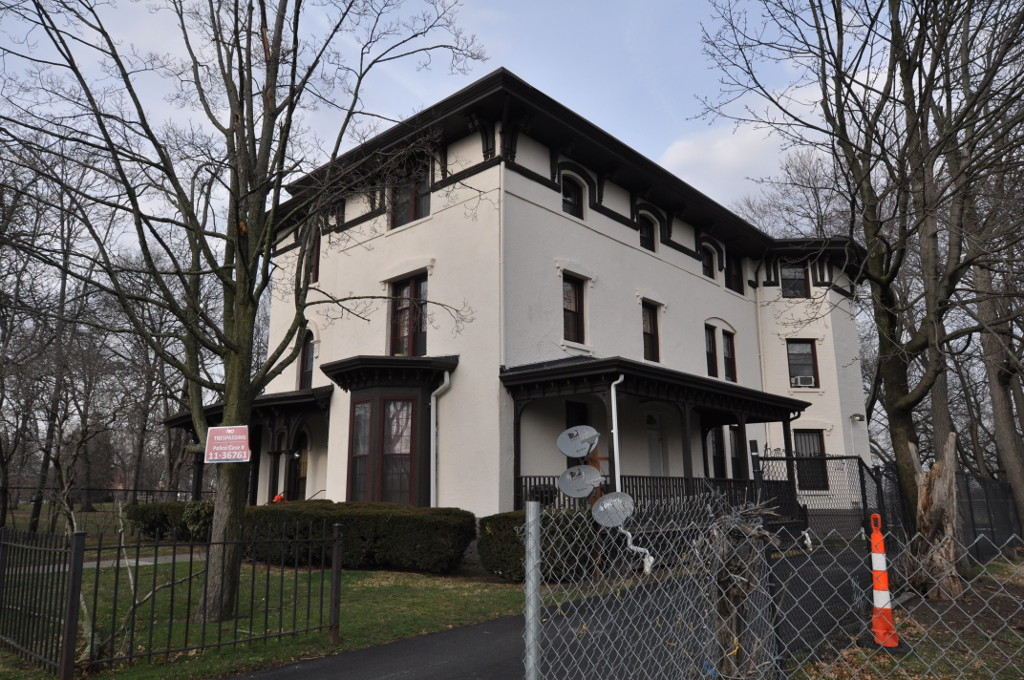

- Location within Connecticut Location within the United States
- Location: 154 Wethersfield Avenue, Hartford, Connecticut
- Coordinates: 41°45′6″N 72°40′27″W
- Area: less than one acre
- Built: 1855
- Architectural style: Italian Villa
- Part of: Coltsville Historic District (ID66000802)
- NRHP reference No.: 75001926

Significant dates
- Added to NRHP: April 14, 1975
- Designated NHLDCP: July 22, 2008

The James B. Colt House is a historic house at 154 Wethersfield Avenue in Hartford, Connecticut. Built in 1855, it is a high-quality example of Italianate architecture. It was built for James B. Colt, the brother of industrialist Samuel Colt, whose Armsmear estate is just to the north. The house was listed on the National Register of Historic Places in 1975.

== Description and history ==
The James B. Colt House is located in the Sheridan-Charter Oak neighborhood of southern Hartford, on the east side of Wethersfield Avenue near its junction with Alden Street. It is situated facing Colt Park, a public city park that was originally part of the Colt family estate, and is south of the larger Armsmear estate of Samuel Colt. It is a three-story masonry structure, built out of brick covered in stucco. It has classic Italian villa features, including a low-pitch hip roof with deep bracketed eaves, and round-arch windows with decorative bracketed caps. The street-facing west facade is restrained, with a single-story porch across its left half that wraps around to the north. The western facade provides vistas of the park through tall windows on all three levels.

The house was built in 1855–57. James B. Colt was then serving as treasurer for the Colt's Manufacturing Company, and lived in the house until 1859. It afterward had a number of high-profile occupants, including General William B. Franklin, Colt's general manager until 1888, and George H. Day, one of Hartford's leading businessmen at the turn of the 20th century. In the 20th century the building was subdivided into apartments, and suffered an inside fire in 1973.

== See also ==
- National Register of Historic Places listings in Hartford County, Connecticut
