= Parkside Historic District (Hartford, Connecticut) =

Historic district in Connecticut, United States

- U.S. National Register of Historic Places
- U.S. Historic district
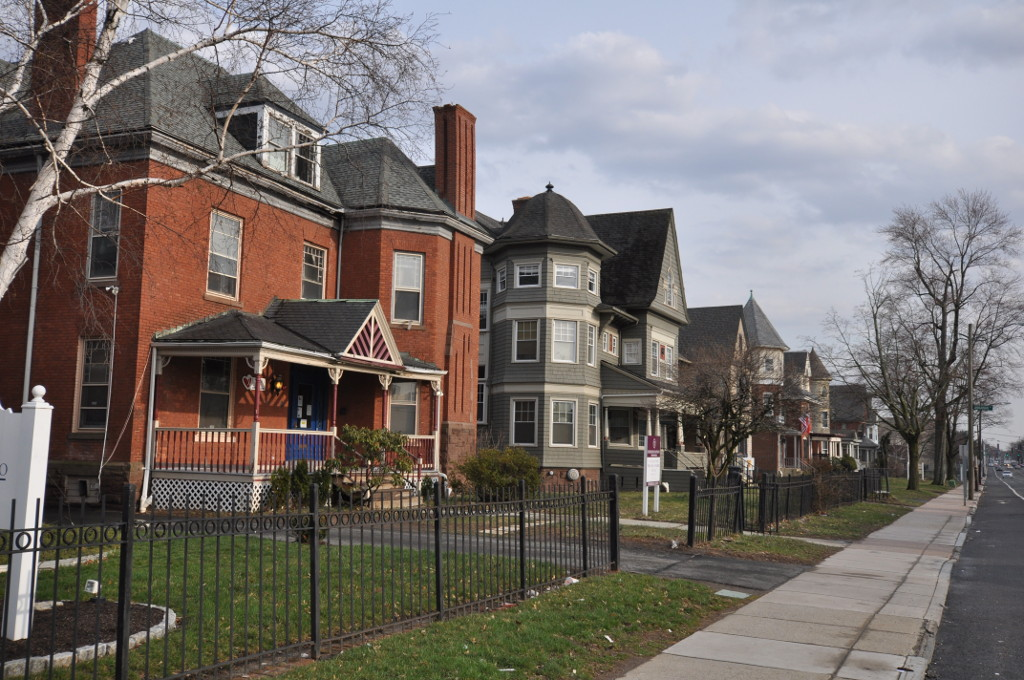

- Location within Connecticut Location within the United States
- Location: 176-230 Wethersfield Avenue (even numbers), Hartford, Connecticut
- Coordinates: 41°45′1″N 72°40′26″W
- Area: 2.6 acres (1.1 ha)
- Built: 1885
- Architectural style: Colonial Revival, Queen Anne
- NRHP reference No.: 84001048
- Added to NRHP: May 31, 1984

The Parkside Historic District encompasses a fine collection of Queen Anne Victorian houses lining the east side of Wethersfield Avenue north of Wawarme Avenue in southern Hartford, Connecticut. This area was developed in the 1880s and 1890s by Mrs. Elizabeth Jarvis Colt, widow of arms manufacturer Samuel Colt, out of a portion of their extensive estate. Of this development, a row of nine houses now remains; it was listed on the National Register of Historic Places in 1984.

== Description and history ==
When Samuel Colt established his arms factory in Hartford, part of the adjacent land became his extensive personal estate. The bulk of that estate became Hartford's Colt Park, with his mansion house, Armsmear, a National Historic Landmark and part of the nascent Coltsville National Historical Park at the northwest corner. South of Armsmear, along Wethersfield Avenue, the estate grounds housed an apple orchard. Colt built a home for his brother James south of Armsmear in 1856. Colt's widow Elizabeth, for reasons unknown, began building houses and selling off lots for development between that house and Wawarme Avenue in the 1880s. She had four houses built, of which two still survive, and sold off eight lots, all of which were eventually built on, with seven of the houses surviving. The west side of Wethersfield Avenue was also developed in the second half of the 19th century with fine Victorian houses; almost all have been torn down and replaced by apartment blocks.

The collection of nine surviving buildings represent one of Hartford's finest concentrations of high-style Queen Anne architecture. They share a uniformity of placement and scale, with similar setbacks and massing, and all 2-1/2 stories set on brownstone foundations. Six have at least partially brick exteriors, while the other three are frame structures finished in clapboards and shingles. All have asymmetrical massing, with projecting gables and bays typical of the Queen Anne period. Notable among them is the c. 1900 home of builder William Scoville at 190 Wethersfield Avenue, which has an octagonal tower at one corner. Scoville is credited with building this house and two others in the row; other architects involved in building these house are Frederick Comstock (one) and Brooks Lincoln (three).

== See also ==
- National Register of Historic Places listings in Hartford, Connecticut
