= List of botanical gardens and arboretums in Connecticut =

This list of botanical gardens and arboretums in Connecticut is intended to include all significant botanical gardens and arboretums in the U.S. state of Connecticut

Name	Image	Affiliation	City
Bartlett Arboretum and Gardens			Stamford
Connecticut College Arboretum		Connecticut College	New London
Dinosaur State Park and Arboretum			Rocky Hill
Edgerton Park Conservancy			New Haven
EEB Biodiversity Education and Research Greenhouses		University of Connecticut	Storrs
Harkness Memorial State Park			Waterford
Hartford Botanical Garden			Hartford
Highstead Arboretum			Redding
Marsh Botanical Garden		Yale University	New Haven
New Canaan Nature Center			New Canaan
Richard Haley Wildlife Gardens			Hampton
Westmoor Arboretum		Westmoor Park	West Hartford

== See also ==
- List of botanical gardens and arboretums in the United States
