= Samuel Colt (disambiguation) =

Samuel Colt (1814–1862), was an American inventor and industrialist.

Samuel Colt may also refer to:

- Samuel P. Colt (1852–1921), American industrialist and politician

== See also ==
- Armsmear, also known as Samuel Colt House
