= Fairfield Avenue Historic District (Hartford, Connecticut) =

Historic district in Connecticut, United States

- U.S. National Register of Historic Places
- U.S. Historic district
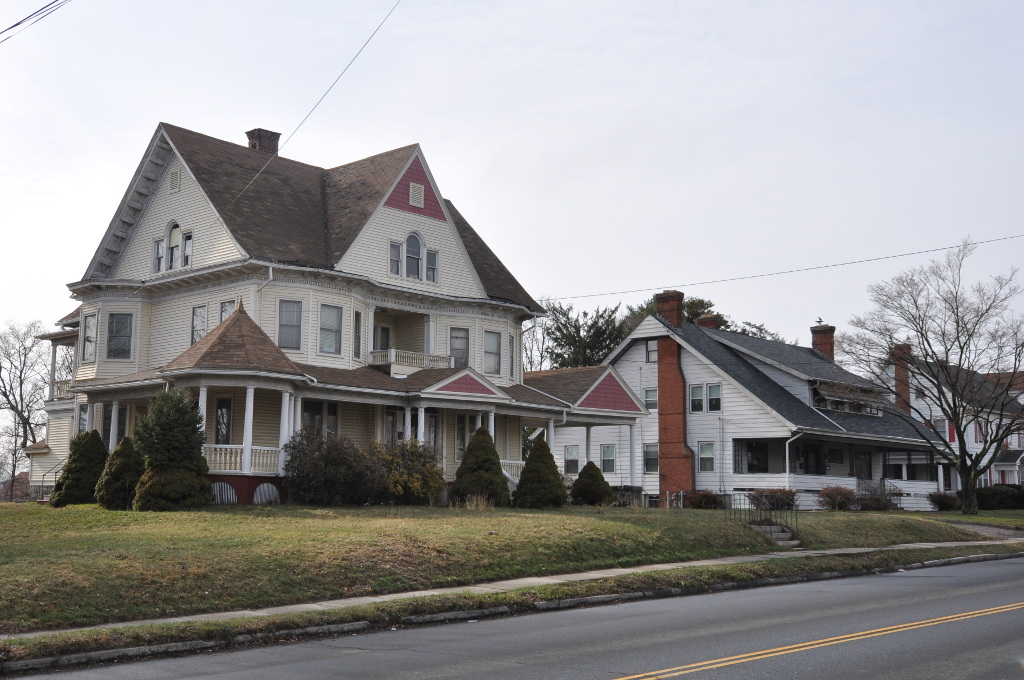

- Location within Connecticut Location within the United States
- Location: Fairfield Avenue between Trinity College and Cedar Crest Cemetery, Hartford, Connecticut
- Coordinates: 41°44′6″N 72°41′34″W
- Area: 42.8 acres (17.3 ha)
- Architectural style: Colonial Revival, Queen Anne, Ranch
- NRHP reference No.: 11000435
- Added to NRHP: July 19, 2011

The Fairfield Avenue Historic District encompasses most of a portion of Fairfield Avenue in Southern Hartford, Connecticut. Extending from Trinity College in the north to Cedar Hill Cemetery in the south, the streetscape typifies the city's development between about 1890 and 1930, a period of growth along the road fueled by the rise of streetcars. The district was listed on the National Register of Historic Places in 1984.

== Description and history ==
Fairfield Avenue is a historically old road, running generally southerly along a ridge south from Downtown Hartford that parallels the general course of the Connecticut River. Until the mid-19th century, it was a rural agricultural area, with an open landscape affording views of the river valley. The view made the area attractive for development, as the city's growing upper class sought places to build country estates after the American Civil War. George Fairfield, a former executive at the Colt Armory, was one of the first to do so, building a fine Second Empire house here in 1866 that stands at 160 Fairfield Avenue. Fairfield was influential in shaping the later development of the area, and the street was given his name by 1870. Several other high-style homes were built along the avenue, but it was the arrival of streetcar service in 1890 that prompted a greater development push.

The historic district is bounded on the north by the campus of Trinity College and Hyland Park, and the south by Cedar Hill Cemetery, but excludes the college campus and cemetery. Most of the properties are residential; Hyland Park is the largest exception, and there is one church, the Memorial Baptist Church. It is one of seven buildings in the district credited to builder Newton Clark, its most prolific contributor. Most of the street's housing was built between then and 1930, and is in styles popular to the period.

== See also ==
- National Register of Historic Places listings in Hartford, Connecticut
