= Parkside Historic District =

Parkside Historic District may refer to:

- Parkside Historic District (Hartford, Connecticut), listed on the National Register of Historic Places (NRHP)
- Parkside East Historic District, Buffalo, New York, NRHP-listed
- Parkside West Historic District, Buffalo, New York, NRHP-listed
- Parkside Historic District (Philadelphia, Pennsylvania), in Parkside neighborhood, NRHP-listed
