= Engine Company 6 Fire Station =

- Engine Company 6
- U.S. National Register of Historic Places
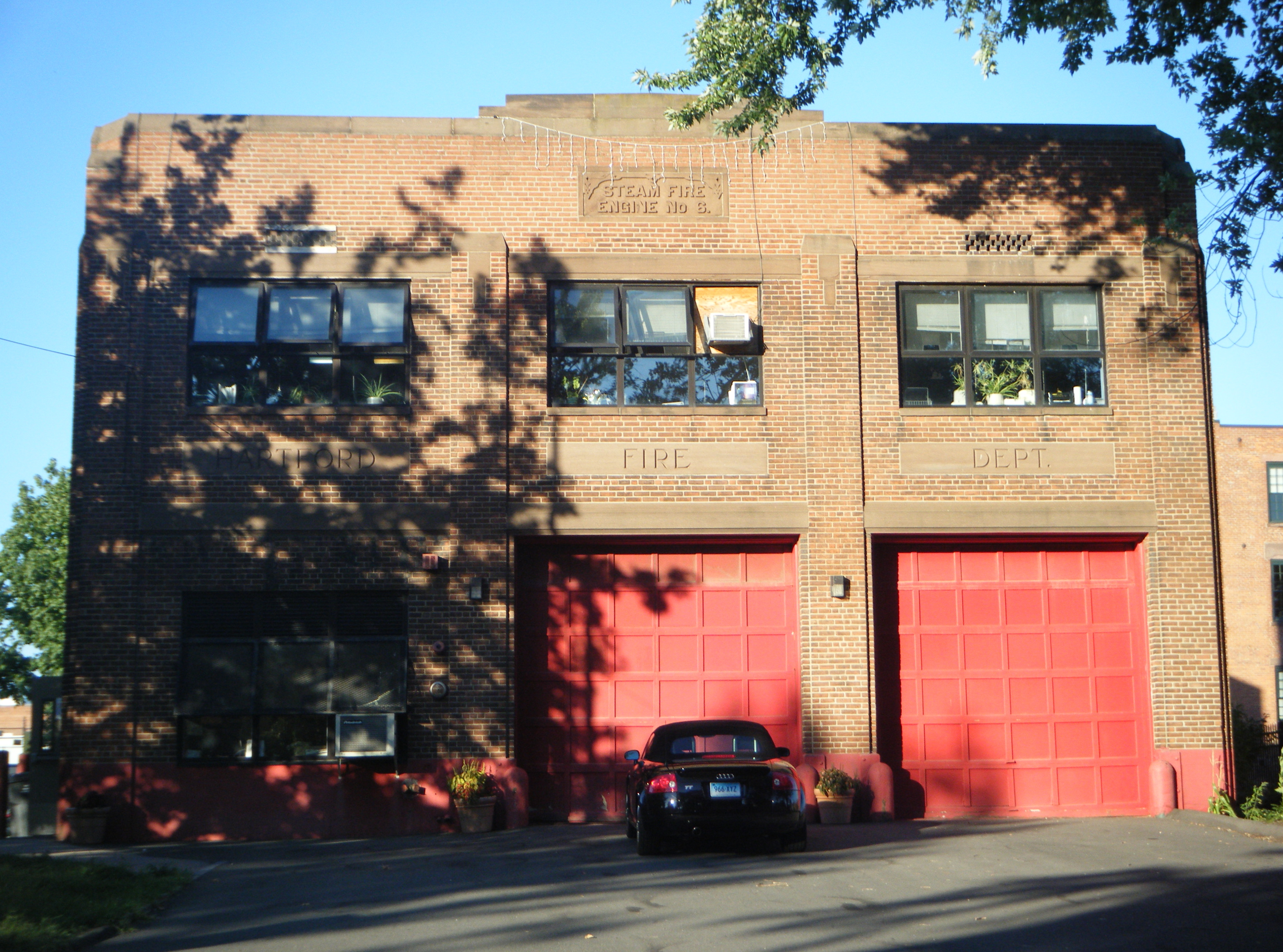

- Location within Connecticut Location within the United States
- Location: 34 Huyshope Avenue, Hartford, Connecticut
- Coordinates: 41°45′26″N 72°39′59″W
- Area: 0.2 acres (0.081 ha)
- Built: 1937
- Architect: Hartford Architectural Bureau
- Architectural style: Moderne
- MPS: Firehouses of Hartford MPS
- NRHP reference No.: 89000020
- Added to NRHP: March 2, 1989

The Engine Company 6 Fire Station is a former Hartford Fire Department firehouse located at 34 Huyshope Avenue in Hartford, Connecticut. Built in 1937, it is a well-preserved example of a Moderne style fire station, and served as such until 1984. The building was listed on the National Register of Historic Places on March 2, 1989. It now houses a homeless shelter.

== Description and history ==
The former Engine Company 6 station is located in Hartford's southeastern Sheldon-Charter Oak neighborhood, on the east side of Huyshope Street at its junction with Nepaquash Street. It is a two-story Moderne style brick and brownstone structure, with a foundation of brownstone and concrete, and a flat roof. It is three bays wide, with two equipment bays on the right. The left bay has a pedestrian entrance and windows, set in a slightly smaller opening. The second floor bays have bands of three sash windows. The interior retains some original fixtures and finishes, but the sliding pole has been removed. The building was listed on the National Register of Historic Places on March 2, 1989.

Engine Company 6 was organized in 1873, and was originally known as the Colt Fire Company, for its proximity to the Colt Armory. The company's first station, an Italianate brick building, was damaged by flooding in 1936 and demolished. This building was constructed as its replacement, and was designed by the city's architectural bureau. It is similar in appearance to the city's Engine Company 5 station, albeit with simpler styling. Engine Company 6 was disbanded in 1984 to form HFD Tactical Unit 1, and the building was repurposed as a homeless shelter.

== See also ==
- National Register of Historic Places listings in Hartford, Connecticut
