= Day-Taylor House =

Historic house in Connecticut, United States

- U.S. National Register of Historic Places
- U.S. Historic district – Contributing property
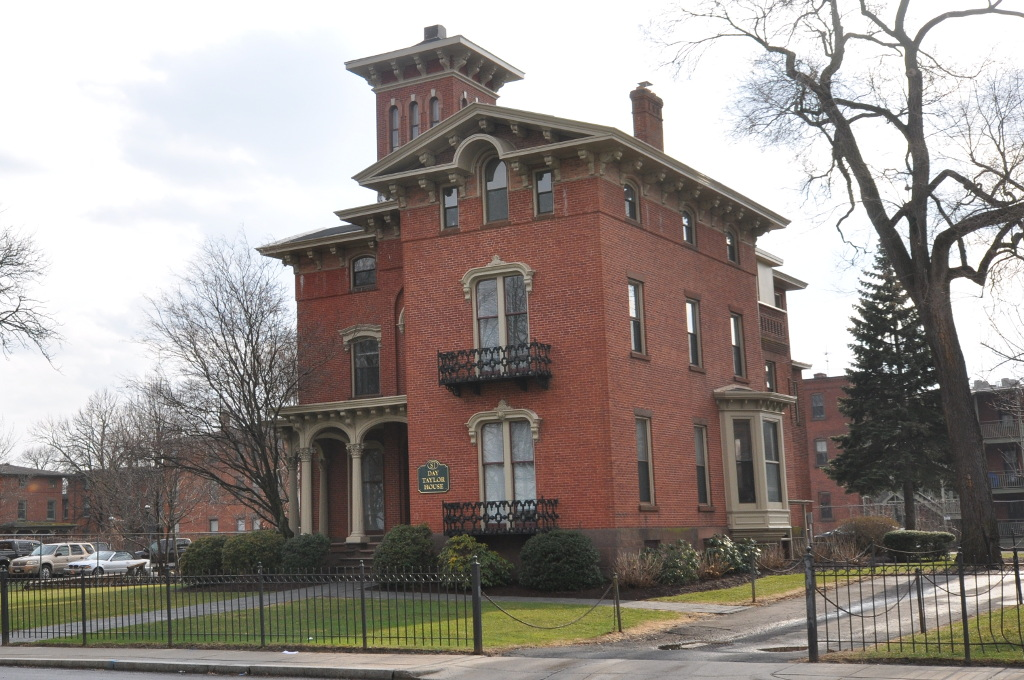

- Location within Connecticut Location within the United States
- Location: 81 Wethersfield Avenue, Hartford, Connecticut
- Coordinates: 41°45′14″N 72°40′32″W
- Area: less than one acre
- Built: 1857
- Built by: Bissell, Hirim
- Architectural style: Italian Villa
- Part of: South Green Historic District (ID02001453)
- NRHP reference No.: 75001930

Significant dates
- Added to NRHP: April 14, 1975
- Designated CP: November 17, 1977

The Day-Taylor House is a historic house at 81 Wethersfield Avenue in Hartford, Connecticut. Built in 1857, it is one of state's best examples of Italianate villa architecture executed in brick. It was listed on the National Register of Historic Places in 1975. It presently houses offices.

== Description and history ==
The Day-Taylor House is located in Hartford's Sheldon-Charter Oak neighborhood, on the west side of Wethersfield Avenue directly opposite the Armsmear estate house of Samuel Colt. It is a 2 1/2-story masonry structure, built out of red brick in a roughly L-shaped plan. It has a hip roof, and a three-story tower rising at the crook of the ell. Both the main roof and tower roof have extended eaves with evenly spaced heavy brackets. Windows on the first two levels are generally set in pairs in rectangular openings with bracketed hoods, although some are set in round-arch openings. Some windows have original cast iron balconies. There are small windows of different shapes in the attic story, including a round-arch window set at the center of the main front-facing facade. A single-story veranda, supported by Corinthian columns, is arrayed around the base of the tower. The interior of the building retains little original styling.

The house was built in 1857 by Hirim Bushnell, the builder of the Connecticut State Capitol and the Memorial Arch in Bushnell Park. It was built for Albert F. Day, a prominent local merchant whose father was Lieutenant Governor of Connecticut. Although its architect is not known, the house bears some resemblance to works of New Haven architect Henry Austin, a champion of the Italianate villa form.

== See also ==
- National Register of Historic Places listings in Hartford, Connecticut
