= Henry Barnard House =

Historic house in Connecticut, United States

- U.S. National Register of Historic Places
- U.S. National Historic Landmark
- U.S. Historic district – Contributing property
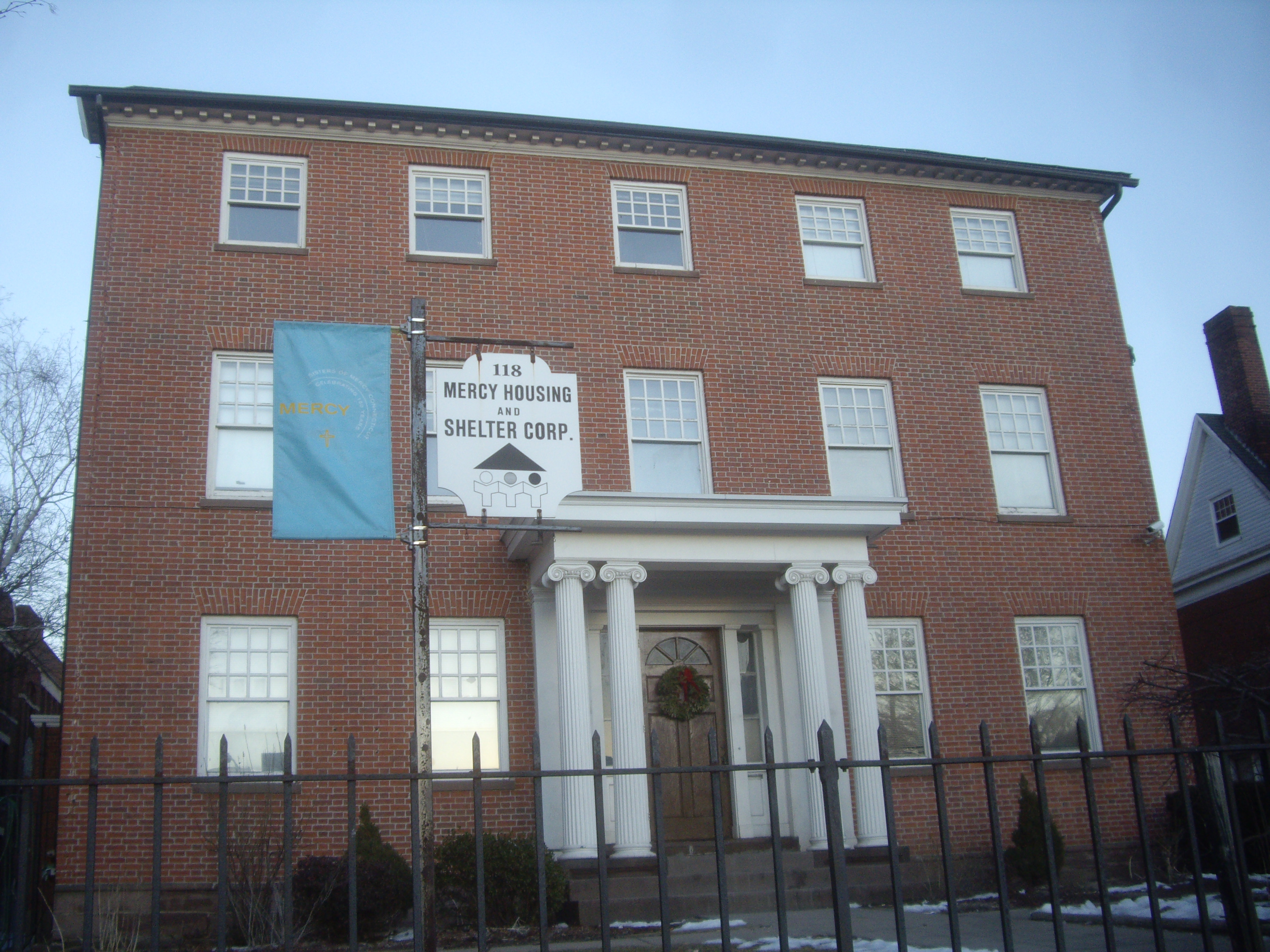

- Location within Connecticut Location within the United States
- Location: 118 Main Street, Hartford, Connecticut
- Coordinates: 41°45′23.65″N 72°40′32.36″W
- Area: less than one acre
- Built: 1807
- Part of: South Green Historic District (ID02001453)
- NRHP reference No.: 66000803

Significant dates
- Added to NRHP: October 15, 1966
- Designated NHL: December 21, 1965
- Designated CP: November 17, 1977

The Henry Barnard House is a historic house and National Historic Landmark at 118 Main Street in Hartford, Connecticut, United States. It was the lifelong home of educator Henry Barnard (1811–1900), an education reformer who was instrumental (along with Horace Mann) in the development of the American public school system. Barnard established the statewide education systems of both Connecticut and Rhode Island, which served as models for the development of such infrastructure in other states. The house is now owned by a religious charity, which operates a homeless shelter on the premises.

== Description and history ==
The Barnard House is a three-story brick structure, five bays wide and three deep, with a side gable roof. The entrance is centered on the front facade, and is sheltered by a portico supported by paired fluted Ionic columns. The entrance is flanked by sidelight windows and pilasters, and topped by a semi-circular four leaf transom window and an entablature. The only other significant exterior styling is the modillioned cornice below the roof line. The interior of the house has been somewhat altered due to its later institutional use, but has retained a basic center hall plan with parlors on either side. The most significant alteration has been the addition of two large sections to the back of the house, which nearly triple its size. These are used to provide shelter space for the local homeless population.

The house was built in 1807, and it was four years later that Henry Barnard was born here. At the time it was located in a fashionable neighborhood of the city, and originally included more land than it presently does. The house remained in the Barnard family until his death in 1900, when it was acquired by the Sisters of Mercy, who operate services for the homeless. It was declared a National Historic Landmark in 1965.

Henry Barnard was educated at Yale College, trained as a lawyer, and entered politics, winning election to the Connecticut state legislature in 1837. Barnard had studied education systems in Europe during travels there, and promoted legislation for statewide supervision of public education. He was thereafter appointed the state's first secretary of education. Forced out of that post by political opponents, he was given a similar post in neighboring Rhode Island, where he promoted legislation creating the nation's first normal school (teacher's college), passed in 1845. He then returned to Connecticut, where he became superintendent of schools, and oversaw establishment of its normal school. He later served in education-related posts in Wisconsin, Maryland, and was the first United States Commissioner of Education, appointed in 1867. He died in this house in 1900.

== See also ==
- List of National Historic Landmarks in Connecticut
- National Register of Historic Places listings in Hartford, Connecticut
