= Church of the Good Shepherd and Parish House =

Historic church in Connecticut, United States

- U.S. National Register of Historic Places
- U.S. National Historic Landmark District – Contributing property
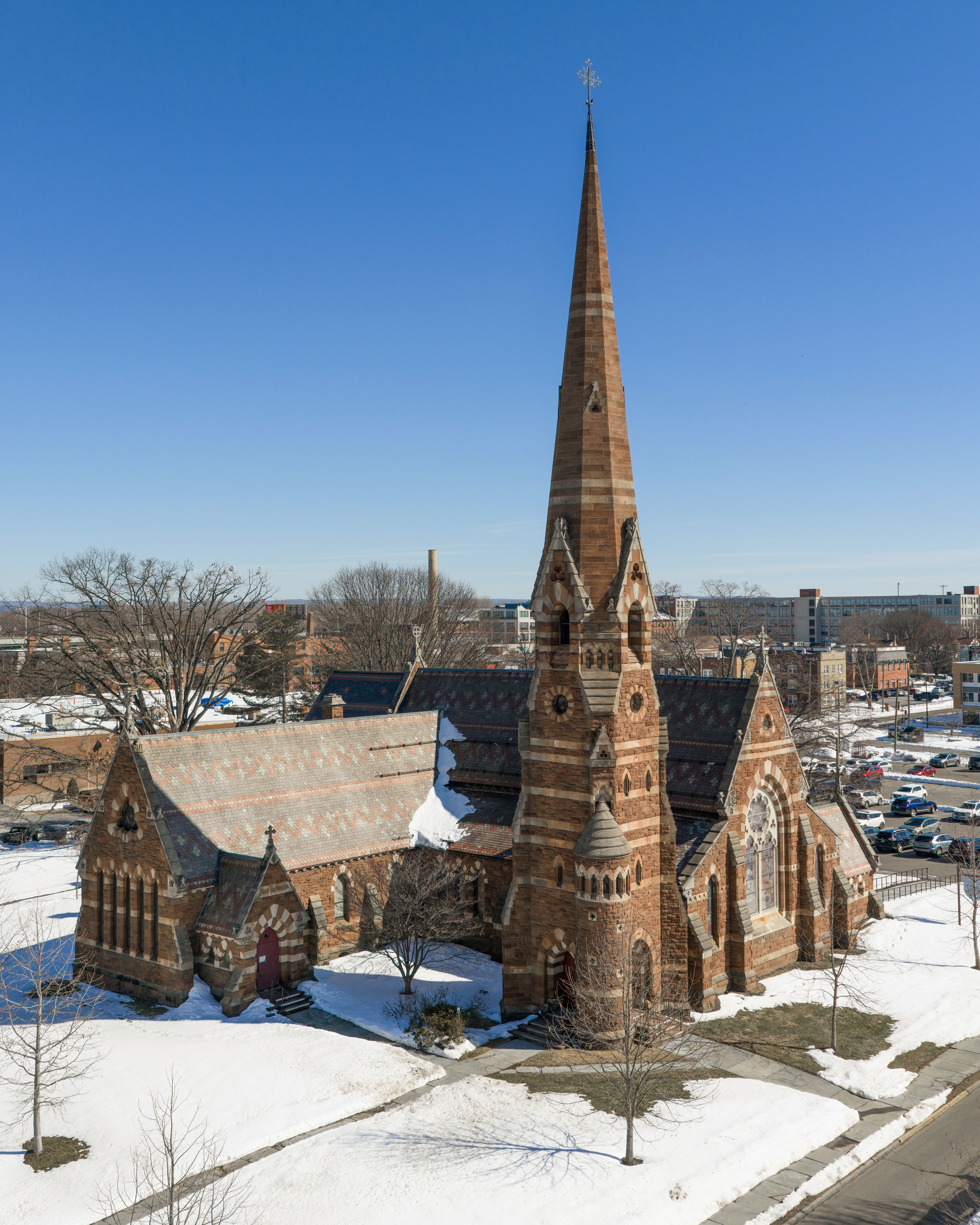
- Church of the Good Shepherd

- Location within Connecticut Location within the United States
- Location: 155 Wyllys Street, Hartford, Connecticut
- Coordinates: 41°45′26″N 72°40′9″W
- Area: 9 acres (3.6 ha)
- Built: 1867
- Architect: Edward Tuckerman Potter
- Architectural style: Gothic
- Part of: Coltsville Historic District (ID66000802)
- NRHP reference No.: 75001925
- Added to NRHP: February 20, 1975

The Church of the Good Shepherd and Parish House is an Episcopal church at 155 Wyllys Street in Hartford, Connecticut. It was commissioned by Elizabeth Jarvis Colt, the widow of Samuel Colt, and completed in 1867. The church and its associated parish house were designed by Edward Tuckerman Potter, and serve as a memorial to Samuel Colt and members of his family. The church and parish house were added to the National Register of Historic Places in 1975, and became a contributing property to the Coltsville Historic District in 2008.

The church reported 212 members in 2016 and 46 members in 2025. Plate and pledge income for the congregation in 2025 was $26,439 with average Sunday attendance (ASA) of 14.

== Description and history ==
The Church of the Good Shepherd is located in Hartford's Coltsville area south of the downtown, on the southeast side of Wyllys Street just south of its junction with Charter Oak Avenue. It is a masonry structure, built out of Portland brownstone and Ohio sandstone. It is roughly T-shaped and has Gothic Revival styling. It has a steeply pitched polychrome slate roof, with parapeted gable ends that have crosses at the peaks. A square tower with buttresses rises at one of the crooks of the T, with a low crenellated battlement below the octagonal spire. The interior features a variety of stone types in the construction of the floors and columns, and has heavy chestnut timbers in the roof framing. The southwest entrance arch is carved with examples of the workers' tools used in the Samuel Colt's factory.

The church was commissioned in 1866 by Elizabeth Jarvis Colt, and serves as a memorial to her husband Samuel, who died in 1862, and three of their children who died in infancy. The parish house was built in 1895, also to a design by Potter, as a memorial to Colt's son, Caldwell Hart Colt, who died in 1894. Potter had come out of retirement to design this building. It continues the Gothic architectural detailing found on the church, but is more symmetrical in its massing. One of the more prominent features on the second floor is an alcove memorial to Caldwell. This memorial features two brass cannons, which the vessel carried and the ship's bell. A large painting of Commodore Colt standing near the wheel on the deck of the Dauntless.

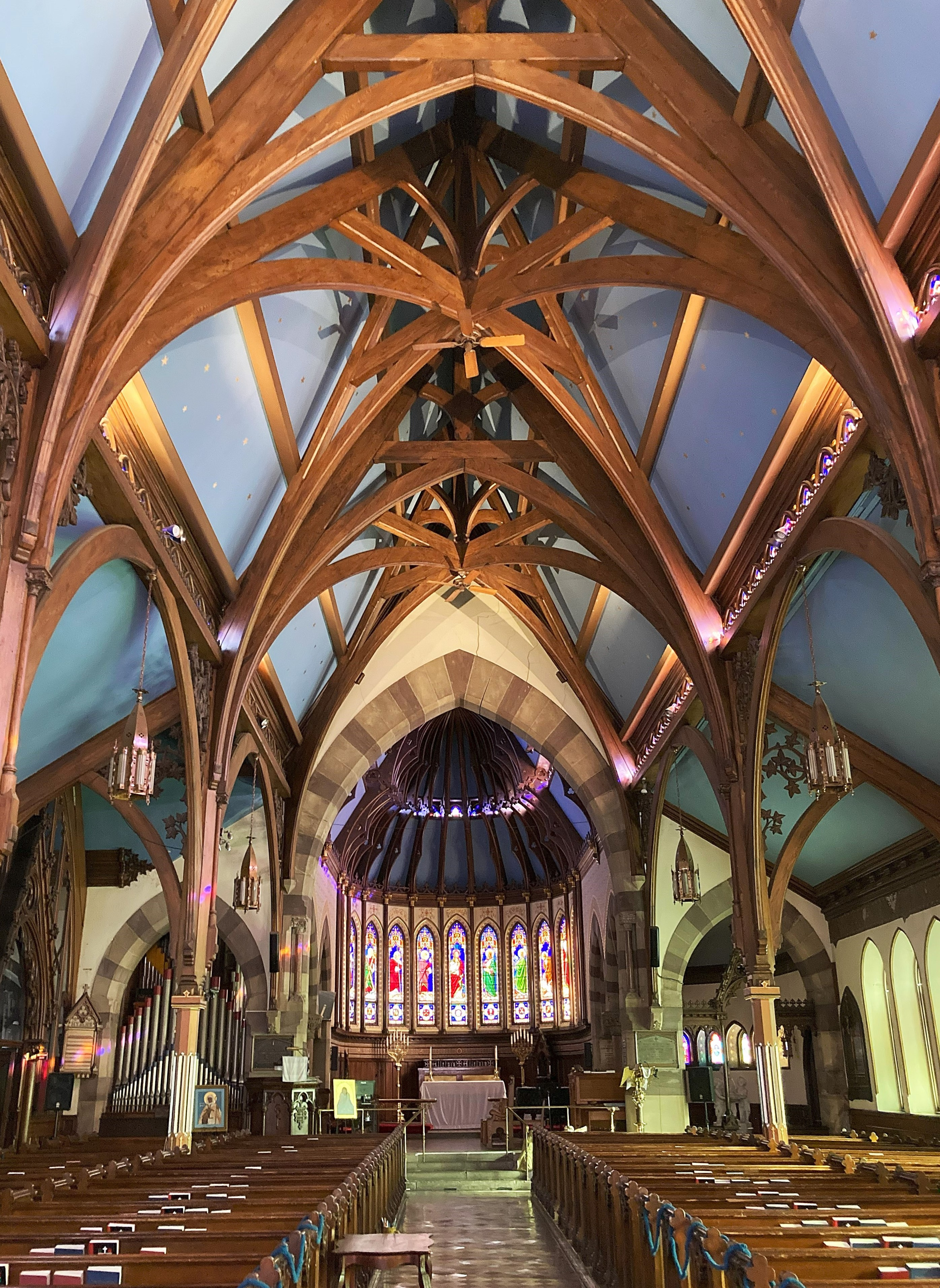
View up the nave toward the chancel

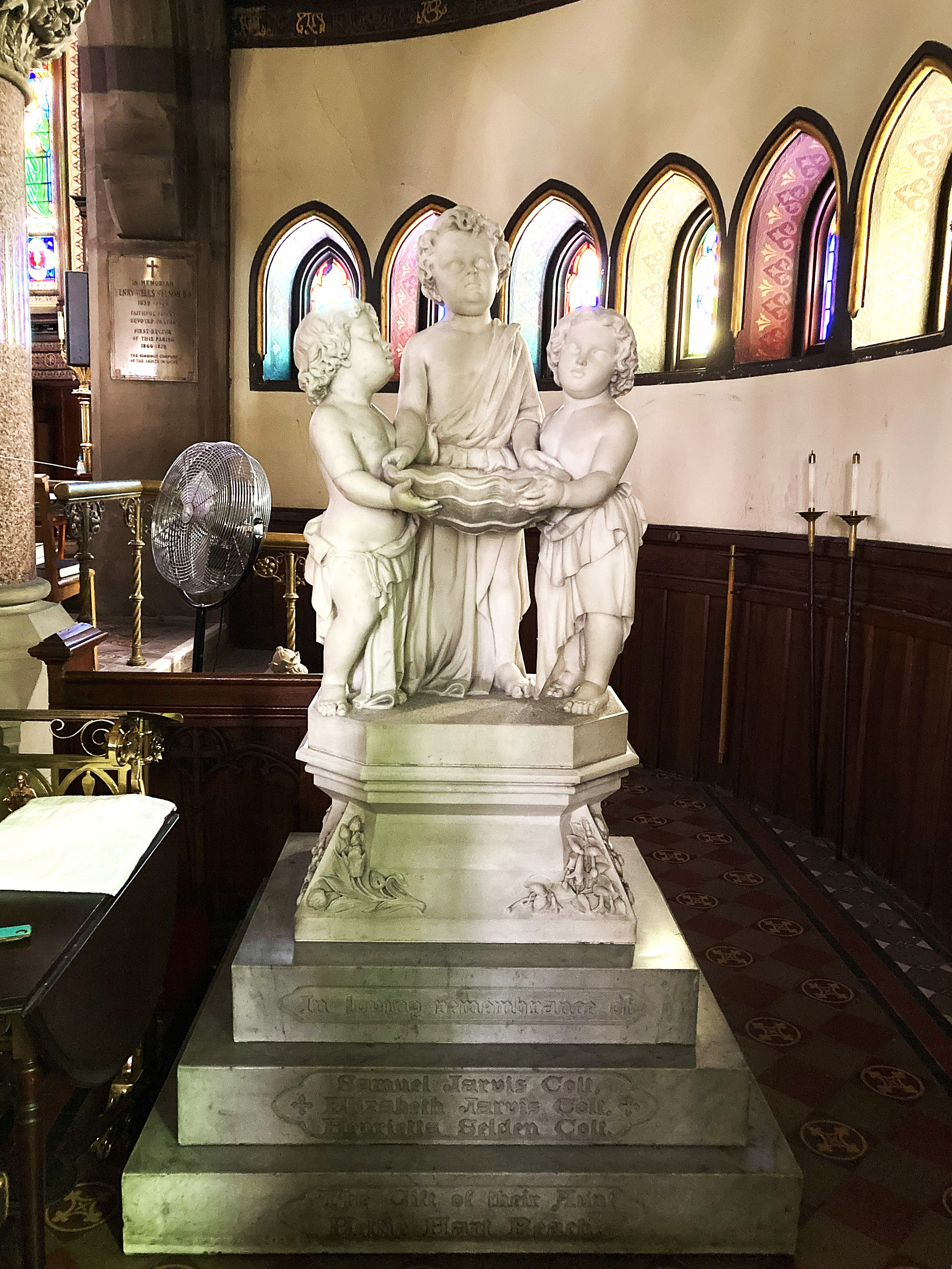
Baptismal font memorial to Colt children

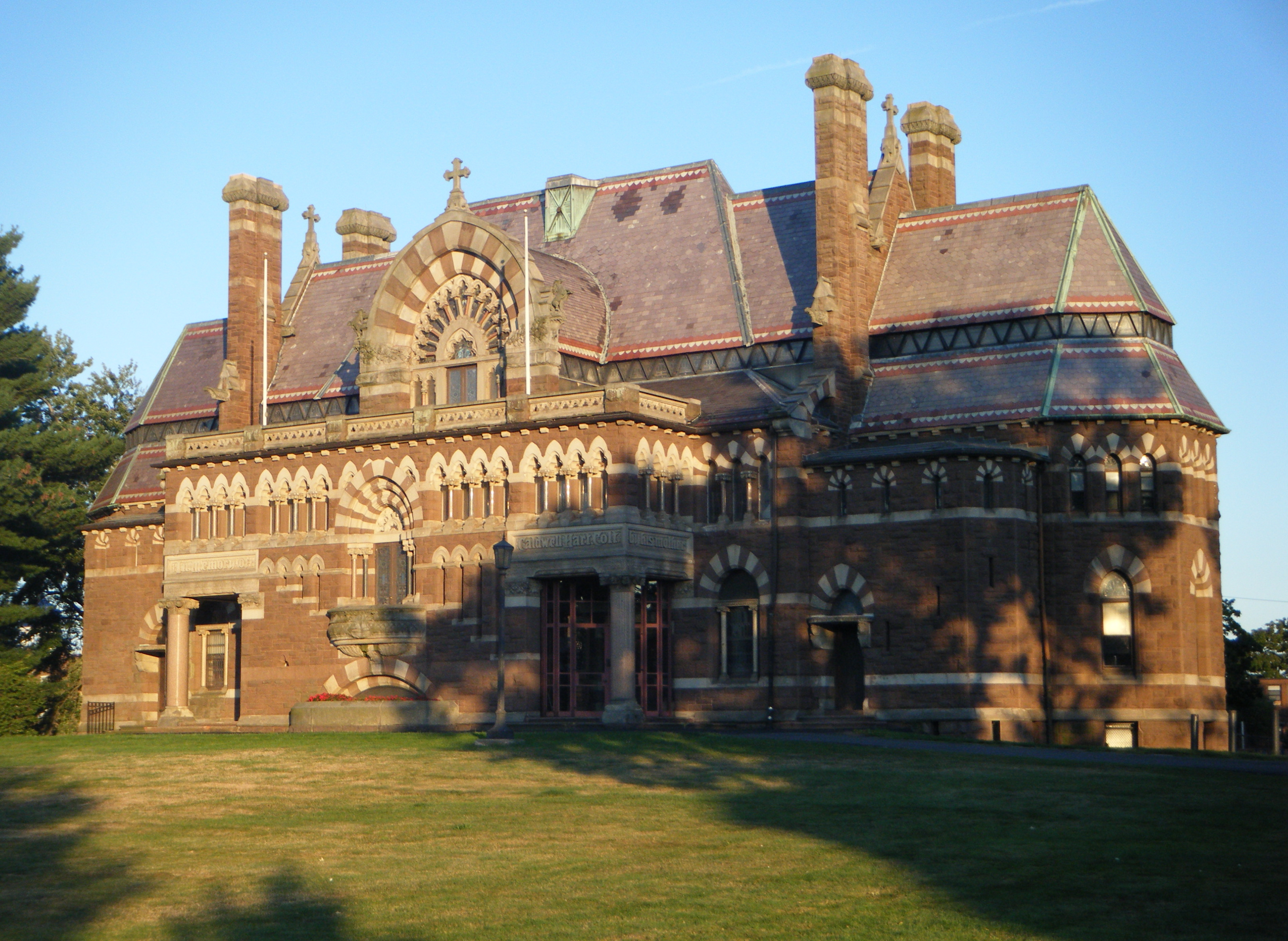
Parish house

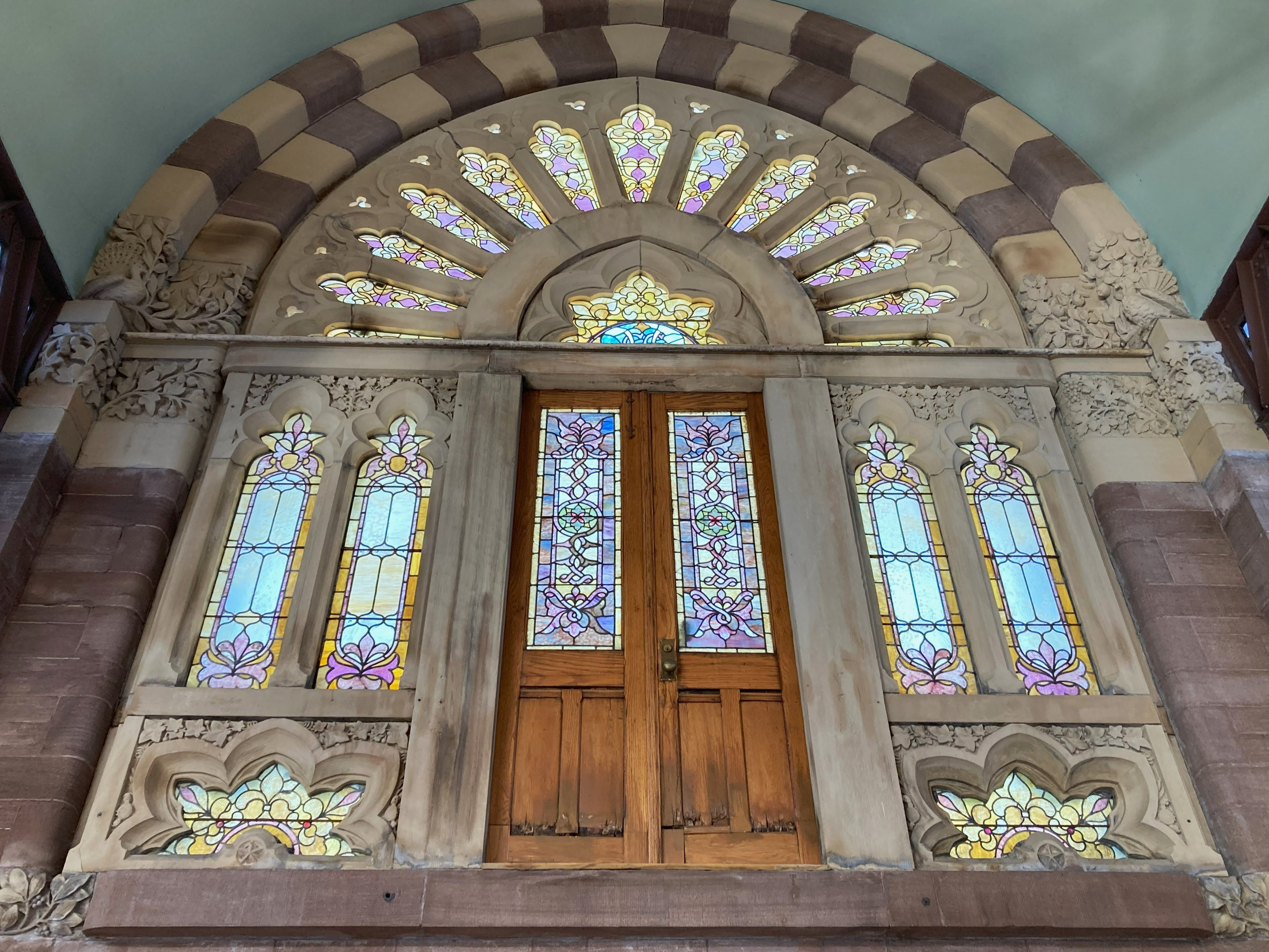
Parish house interior

== See also ==
- National Register of Historic Places listings in Hartford, Connecticut
