= John Whelan Sterling =

American academic (1816–1885)

John W. Sterling
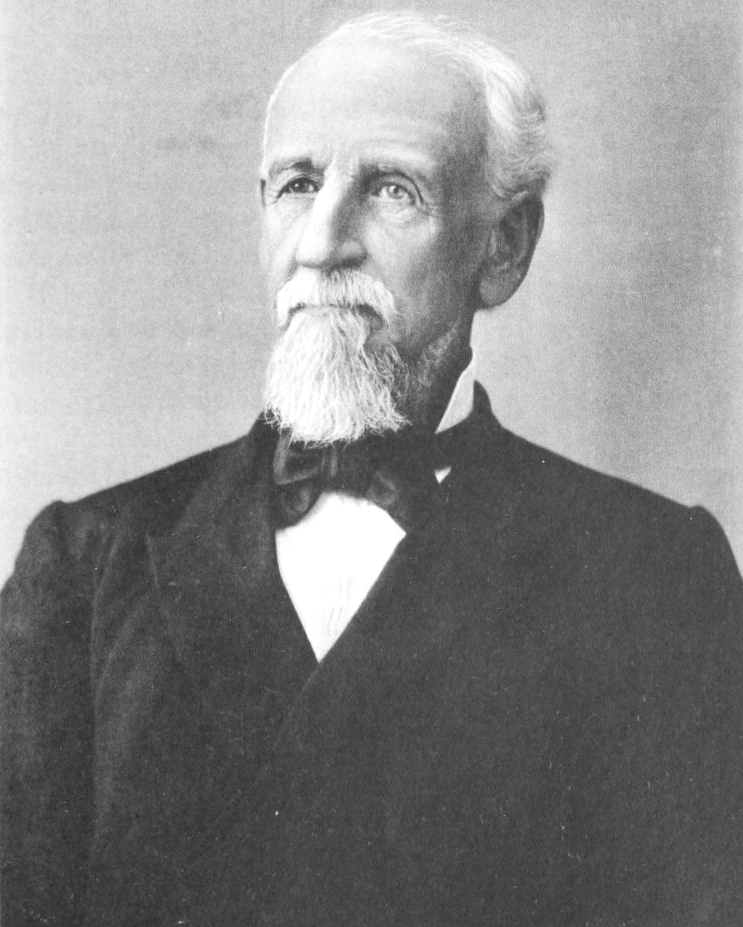
- John W. Sterling
- Born: July 17, 1816; Wyoming County, Pennsylvania, US
- Died: March 9, 1885 (aged 68); Madison, Wisconsin, US
- Occupation(s): Professor and university administrator
- Known for: Nurturing the University of Wisconsin in its formative years.

John Whelan Sterling (July 17, 1816 – March 9, 1885) was a pioneer faculty member of the University of Wisconsin–Madison. When the first university chancellor John Hiram Lathrop opened the school in 1849, he and Sterling were the only two professors. As an early faculty member and in his capacity as dean of faculty and vice chancellor from 1861 to 1867, Sterling was often called the "father of the university".

== Early life and education ==
Sterling was born in Wyoming County, Pennsylvania. His father, Major Daniel Sterling, had 20 children in two marriages. John's mother was Daniel's third wife Rachel. (Daniel's first short marriage produced no children.) John Sterling attended ordinary grammar schools and then took preparatory courses at Hamilton Academy and Homer Academy in New York. He worked in a law office for a year, and in 1837 entered the College of New Jersey (now Princeton) as a sophomore, graduating in 1840. He then attended the theological seminary in Princeton, afterwards performing missionary work in Pennsylvania. In 1846 he moved to Wisconsin. He taught one year at Carroll College and another year at a private school in Waukesha, Wisconsin.

== Academic career ==
On October 7, 1848, he was elected professor of mathematics at the University of Wisconsin. He taught and held the position of department chair for many years while holding other administrative positions. Like Lathrop, he never gave up teaching while performing his administrative functions. During the administration of Chancellor Barnard of the University, from July 1858, to July 1860, Prof. Sterling was de facto head of the institution and from the latter date until June 1867, he was acting chancellor, by authority of the regents. Having previously acted as dean of the faculty, he was, in 1860, continued by the regents in that office until 1865. In 1865 he was elected vice-chancellor, and vice-president in 1869, which office he held until his death.

Sterling married Harriet Dean of Raynham, Massachusetts, on September 3, 1851. They eventually had three children. Their daughter Susan Adelaide Sterling graduated from the University of Wisconsin in 1879, and after graduate school and other career development, was named assistant professor of German at UW in 1900.

Sterling was known for "extending encouragement and generous aid to all who were in need." He was the chief administrator of the university when it first admitted women in 1863, and he was a general advocate for women's equality in education. He and Harriet presided over a women's residence hall beginning in 1881. John Muir credits Professor Sterling for hearing Muir's personal appeal for admission to the school, since Muir did not formally have the educational background due to his work on the family farm in rural Marquette County. As Muir put it:

With fear and trembling, overladen with ignorance, I called on Professor Stirling [sic], who was then Acting President, presented my case, and told him how far I had got on with my studies at home, and that I hadn't been to school since leaving Scotland at the age of eleven years, excepting one short term of a couple of months at a district school, because I could not be spared from the farm work. After hearing my story, the kind professor welcomed me to the glorious University — next, it seemed to me, to the Kingdom of Heaven.

Sterling Hall on the UW campus was named after him in 1921, and is currently the home of the school's astronomy department. It became infamous for the 1970 Sterling Hall bombing which resulted in the death of a university physics researcher and injuries to three others.
