= Charter Oak Place =

Historic street in Hartford, Connecticut, US

- U.S. National Register of Historic Places
- U.S. Historic district
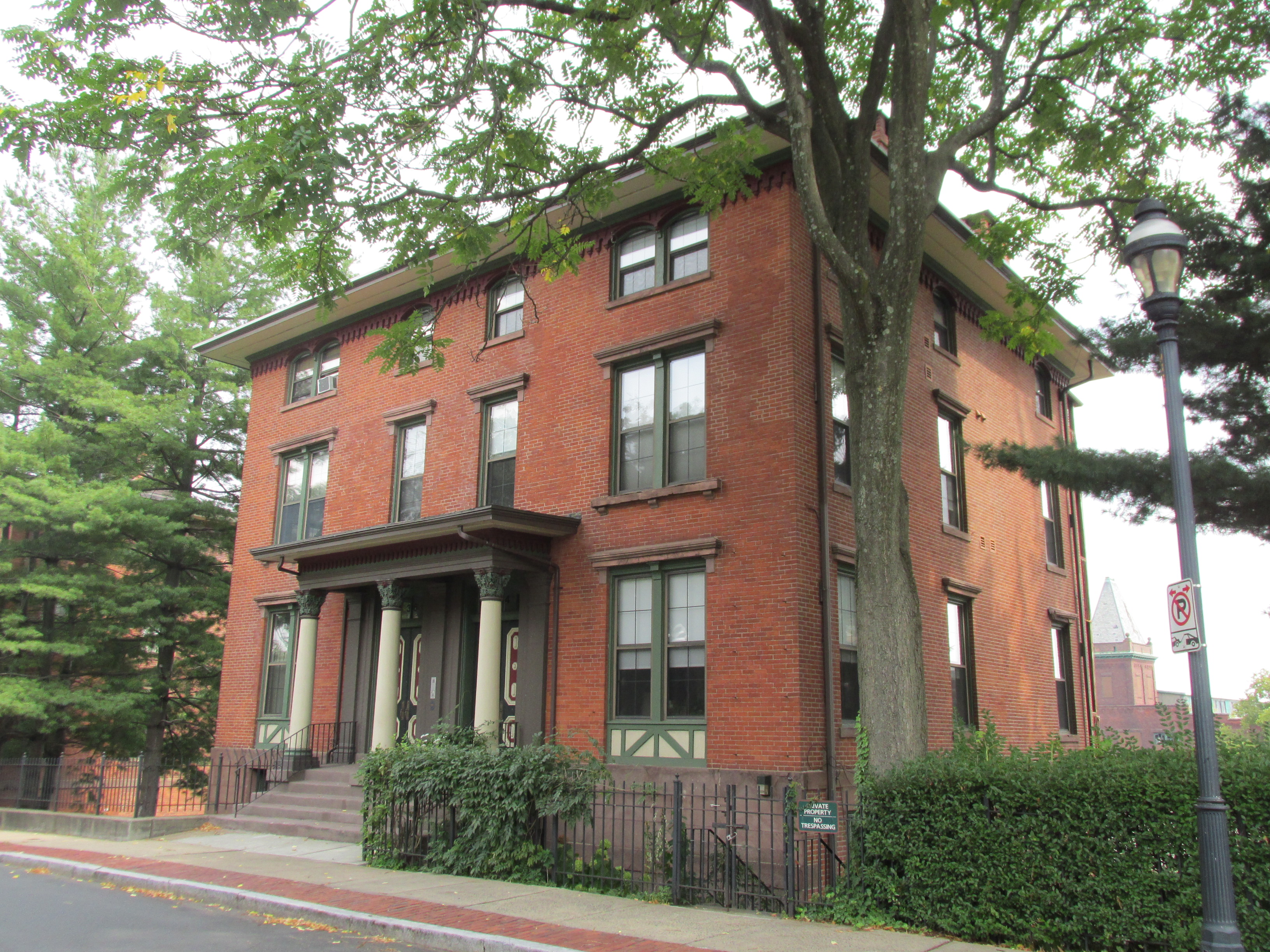

- Location within Connecticut Location within the United States
- Location: 1-3, 7-40 Charter Oak Place, Hartford, Connecticut
- Coordinates: 41°45′29″N 72°40′24″W
- Area: 6.5 acres (2.6 ha)
- Architectural style: Second Empire, Queen Anne, Romano-Tuscan Renaissance Re
- NRHP reference No.: 78002884 (original); 82004403 (increase)

Significant dates
- Added to NRHP: January 20, 1978
- Boundary increase: May 12, 1982

Charter Oak Place is a street on the South Side of Downtown Hartford, Connecticut. Laid out in the 1860s, its residential character is in marked contrast to the commercial development that predominates around it. The street's buildings, constructed between the early 1860s and 1900, are a cross-section of Victorian architectural styles. The entire length of the street is listed on the National Register of Historic Places.

== Description and history ==
Charter Oak Place is located on the southern fringe of Hartford's downtown area. Its northern end is on Charter Oak Avenue between Main Street and Popieluszko Court, and its southern end is on Wyllys Street. It may be seen to continue as South Prospect Street to the north and Groton Street to the south. It is a relatively narrow road, but is lined by trees and represents a quiet urban residential enclave in an otherwise more densely built area. The buildings which line the street are all residential, containing either one or two housing units. The majority of buildings are brick and 2-1/2 or 3 stories in height. Stylistically they are diverse, including examples of Italianate, Second Empire, Romanesque, and Queen Anne Victorian styles. Three of the houses at the Southern end are wood frame structures. Some of the properties have a carriage house in the rear.

The area that became Charter Oak Place was a country estate in the mid-19th century. Charter Oak Place was informally laid out about 1857, and development proceeded from the 1860s until about 1900. The urban density of the relatively high quality construction and upper class focus is somewhat unusual for Hartford, because most of the city's upper class were during the late 19th century moving to more suburban settings, in neighborhoods such as Clay-Arsenal north of the downtown. Charter Oak Place was populated by merchants, judges, and skilled craftsmen. One notable resident of the street was Richard Jordan Gatling, inventor of the Gatling gun.

== See also ==
- National Register of Historic Places listings in Hartford, Connecticut
