= Henry Barnard =

American educator (1811–1900)

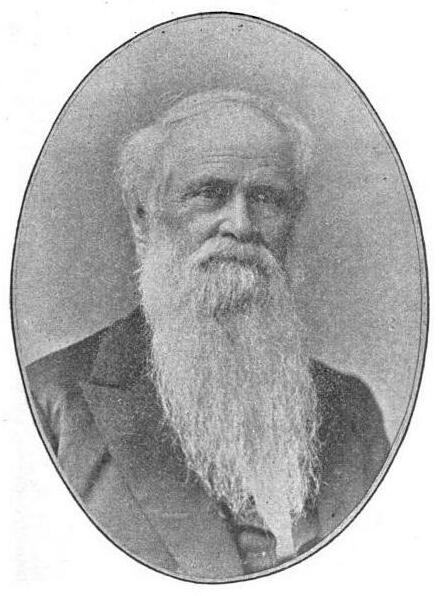

United States Commissioner of Education
- In office March 11, 1867 – March 15, 1870
- President: Andrew Johnson; Ulysses Grant
- Preceded by: Position established
- Succeeded by: John Eaton

Personal details
- Born: January 24, 1811 Hartford, Connecticut, U.S.
- Died: July 5, 1900 (aged 89) Hartford, Connecticut, U.S.
- Education: Yale University (BA)

Henry Barnard (January 24, 1811 – July 5, 1900) was an American educator and reformer.

== Biography ==
He was born in Hartford, Connecticut on January 24, 1811 and attended Wilbraham & Monson Academy. He graduated from Yale University in 1830 and was admitted to the Connecticut bar in 1835. In 1837–1839, he was a member of the Connecticut House of Representatives, effecting in 1838 the passage of a bill, drafted and introduced by himself, which provided for "the better supervision of the common schools", and established a board of "commissioners of common schools" in the state. He was the secretary of the board from 1838 until its abolition in 1842, and during this time worked indefatigably to reorganize and reform the common school system of the state, thus earning a national reputation as an educational reformer.

In 1843, he was appointed by the governor of Rhode Island agent to examine the public schools of the state, and recommended improvements; and his work resulted in the reorganization of the school system two years later. From 1845 to 1849, he was the first commissioner of public schools in the state, and his administration was marked by a decided step in educational progress. In 1845, Barnard established the first "Rhode Island Teachers Institute" at Smithville Seminary.

Returning to Connecticut, from 1851 to 1855, he was "superintendent of common schools", and principal of the Connecticut State Normal School at New Britain, Connecticut.

In 1852, Barnard was offered the newly created position of President of the University of Michigan, but he declined. From 1859 to 1860, he was chancellor of the University of Wisconsin–Madison and agent of the board of regents of the normal school fund; in 1866 he was president of St. John's College in Annapolis, Maryland; and from 1867 to 1870 he was the first United States Commissioner of Education, and in this position he laid the foundation for the subsequent work of the Bureau of Education.

He was awarded American Library Association Honorary Membership in 1893.

== American Journal of Education ==
Barnard's chief service to the cause of education, however, was rendered as the editor, from 1855 to 1881, of the American Journal of Education, the thirty-one volumes of which are a veritable encyclopedia of education, one of the most valuable compendiums of information on the subject ever brought together through the agency of any one man. He also edited from 1838 to 1842, and again from 1851 to 1854, the Connecticut Common School Journal, and from 1846 to 1849 the Journal of the Rhode Island Institute of Instruction.

== Death and legacy ==
He died at Hartford on July 5, 1900, aged 89.

He is buried at Cedar Hill Cemetery in Hartford. The Henry Barnard School at Rhode Island College and the Henry Barnard School in New Rochelle, New York are named in his honor. There is also an elementary school named in his honor in Enfield, CT-Henry Barnard Elementary School.

== See also ==
- Henry Barnard House
- Education in Connecticut

Academic offices
Preceded by John Lathrop	Chancellor of the University of Wisconsin, Madison; 1857–1859	Succeeded by John Sterling
Political offices
New office	Rhode Island Commissioner of Education; 1845–1849	Succeeded by Elisha R. Potter
New office	Connecticut Superintendent of Education; 1849–1854	Succeeded by John Dudley Philbrick
New office	United States Commissioner of Education; 1867–1870	Succeeded by John Eaton
