= Westmoor Park =

Park and farm on Flagg Road in West Hartford, Connecticut

Coordinates: 41.783°N 72.760°W

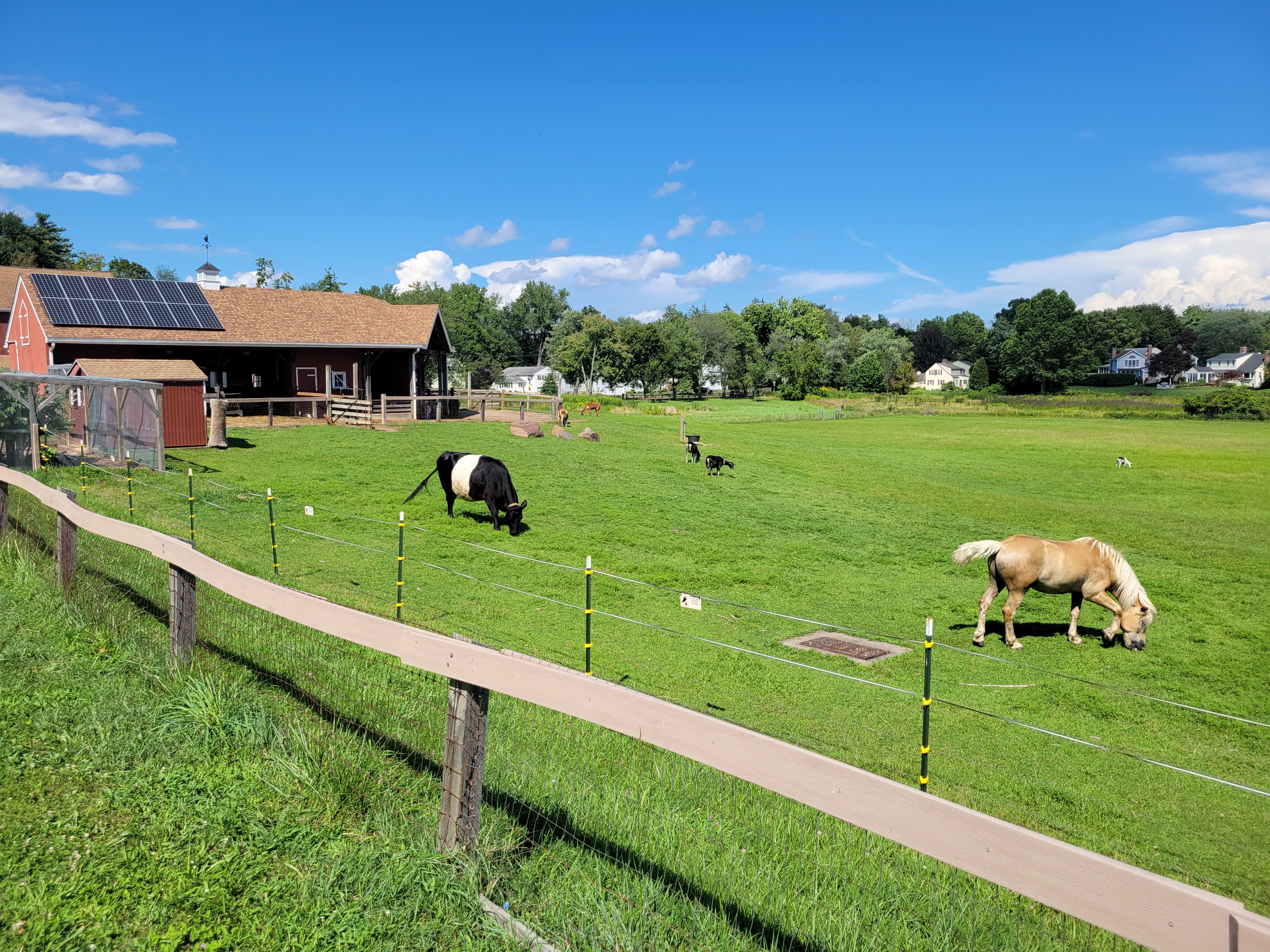
- Barn with farm animals are just one portion of the park.
- Interactive map of Westmoor Park
- Website: Official website

Westmoor Park is a 162-acre park and farm located on Flagg Road in West Hartford, Connecticut. The park is open dawn to dusk daily. The farm barn is open 9 am to 4 pm daily for visitors to see the animals. The primary focus of the park is environmental education. It is operated by the Leisure Services Department of West Hartford.

== History ==
After being in private ownership since the end of the 17th century, the land at Westmoor Park was donated to the town of West Hartford in March 1973. Charles Hunter officially relinquished the land to the town upon his death in January 1961, with the provision that it be passed down to his wife, Leila, for the remainder of her life. When she died in January 1973, the town of West Hartford assumed control of the land two months later.

== Arboretum ==
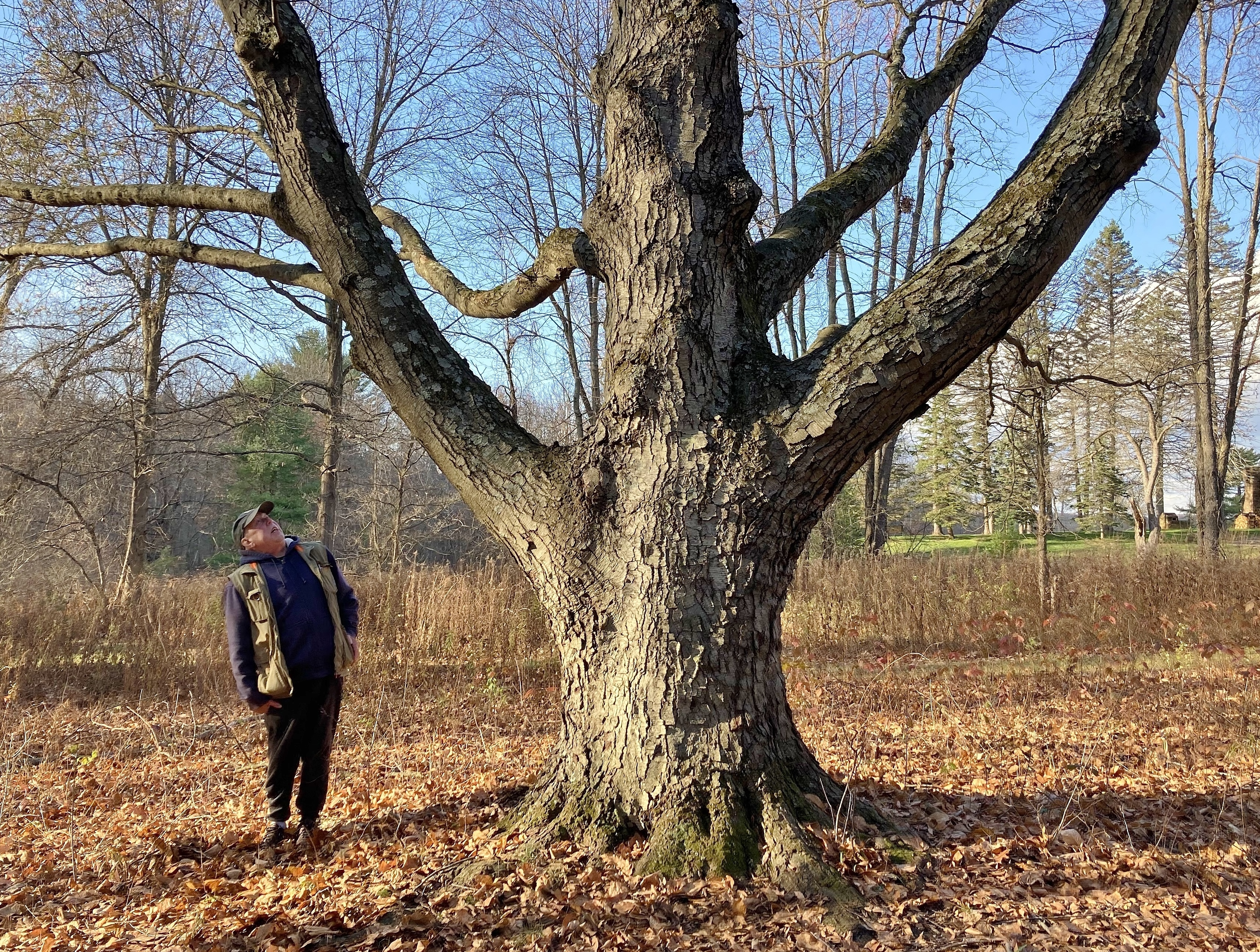
Black Birch tree at Westmoor Park Arboretum

In 2023, Westmoor Park was designated as a Level I Arboretum by ArbNet and the Morton Arboretum of Chicago. The Westmoor Arboretum has more than 63 different species of trees, including a Franklin Tree, Giant Sequoia, Japanese Stewartia, and European Larch. As of 2024, Westmoor Park was upgraded to a Level II Arboretum.
