= Colt Park =

- U.S. Historic district – Contributing property
- U.S. National Historic Landmark District – Contributing property
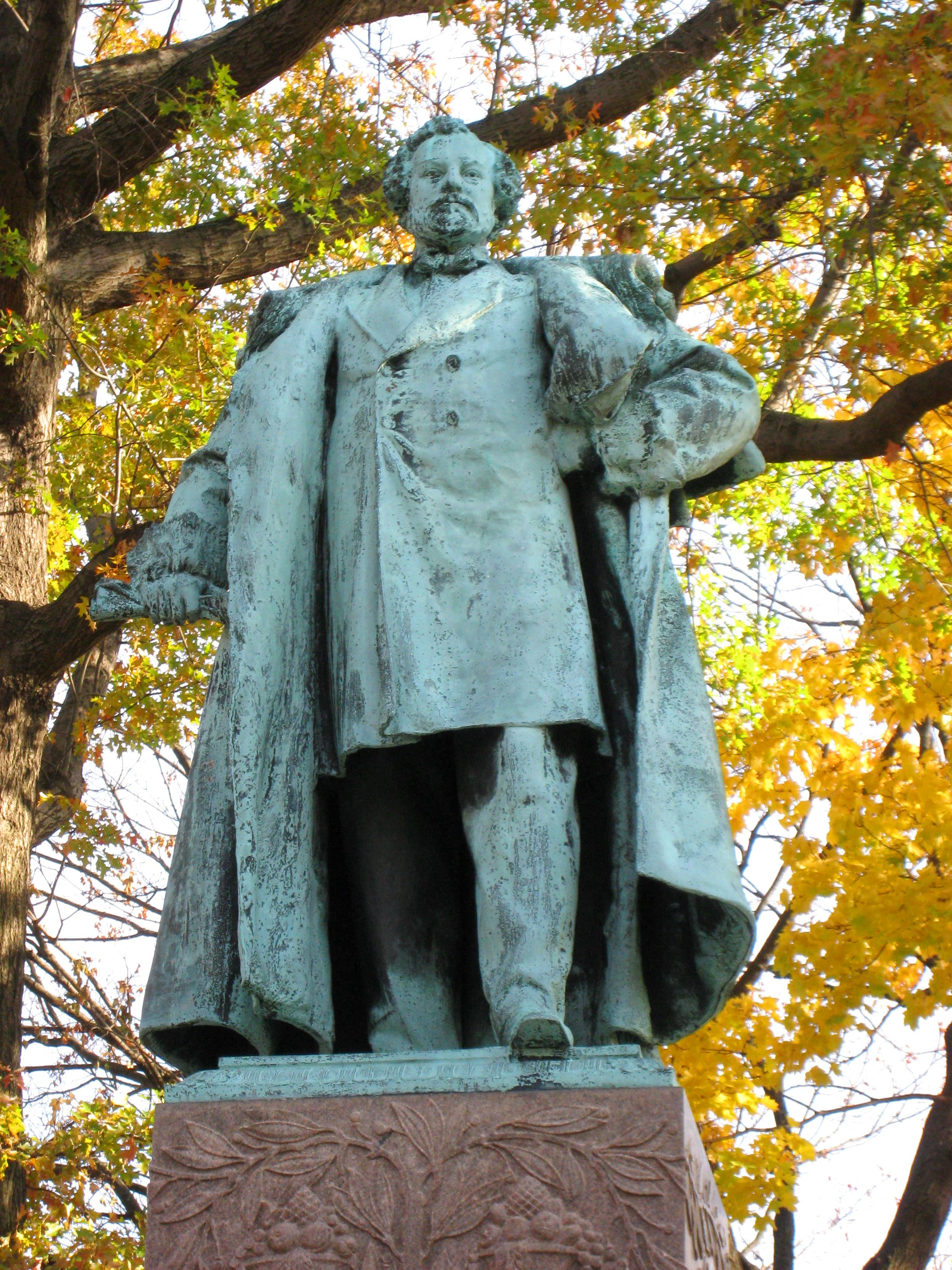
- Samuel Colt Memorial, Colt Park

- Location within Connecticut Location within the United States
- Location: Hartford, Connecticut
- Coordinates: 41°45′7″N 72°40′16″W
- Area: 106 acres (43 ha)
- Built: 1905
- Part of: Colt Industrial District (ID76001987)
- Added to NRHP: June 8, 1976

Colt Park is a city park in the neighborhood of Sheldon/Charter Oak in southeast Hartford, Connecticut. The 106-acre (43 ha) park was established from the former Armsmear Estate of Samuel Colt and Elizabeth Jarvis Colt which was gifted to the city upon her death in 1905. Today the park is home to playgrounds, sports fields, a pool and Dillon Stadium. Colt Park was listed on the National Register of Historic Places on June 8, 1976, designated as part of the Colt Industrial District, valued for its association with industrialist Samuel Colt. It is bounded by Wawarme, Wethersfield, Hendricxsen, Van Dyke Avenues and Stonington, Maseek and Sequassen Streets.

The grounds were originally developed in High Victorian Gothic style, and served as Colt's exclusive "pleasure-grounds." It was complete with large reflecting pools, rustic furnishings, fountains, urns, statuary, artificial ponds for fish and foul, a deer park, orchards, fields and more.

Pope Park and Colt Park were the last major additions to the City of Hartford Parks System in 1898 and 1905, respectively. The two parks were intended to serve the traditionally working-class Hartford neighborhoods of Frog Hollow, Parkville, and Front Street.

In 2019, Public Field #9 was renamed in honor of Hartford native and Negro league baseball player Johnny "Schoolboy" Taylor.

== Dillon Stadium ==
The lands for Dillon Stadium were a part of the original Colt gift. The stadium was Federal Emergency Relief Administration relief project and was dedicated in 1935, with the related Field House erected in 1939. Stadium seating capacity is 9,600, and includes a block west of the stadium for dedicated surface parking. It has been host to various concerts and sports teams throughout its history. After not having been used for some years, the stadium was refurbished and partly rebuilt in 2018-19. It is the current home of the Hartford Athletic.

== See also ==
- Bushnell Park
- Elizabeth Park
- Pope Park
