= Coltsville Historic District =

Historic district in Connecticut, United States

- U.S. National Register of Historic Places
- U.S. National Historic Landmark District
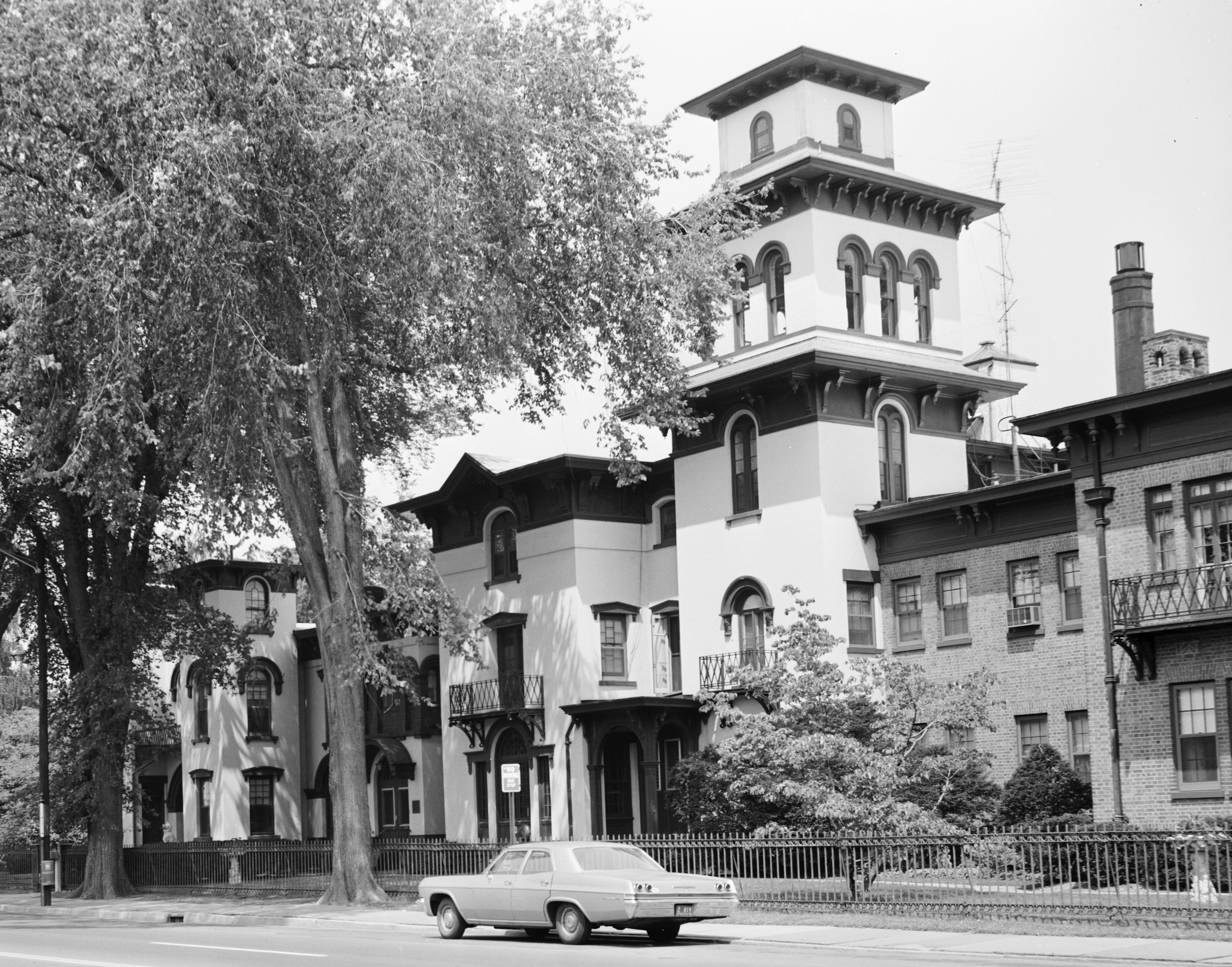
- Armsmear

- Location within Connecticut Location within the United States
- Location: Hartford, Connecticut
- Coordinates: 41°45′13.89″N 72°40′29.03″W
- Built: 1855
- Architectural style: Italianate
- Website: Coltsville National Historical Park
- NRHP reference No.: 66000802

Significant dates
- Added to NRHP: November 13, 1966
- Designated NHLD: July 22, 2008

Coltsville Historic District is a National Historic Landmark District in Hartford, Connecticut. The district encompasses the factory, worker housing, and owner residences associated with Samuel Colt (1814-1862), one of the nation's early innovators in precision manufacturing and the production of firearms. It was the site of important contributions to manufacturing technology made by Colt and the industrial enterprise he created. Coltsville is a cohesive and readily identifiable 260-acre (110 ha) area, part of which was originally listed as the Colt Industrial District on the National Register of Historic Places in 1976. It was designated a National Historic Landmark in 2008.

After a two decade-long campaign to designate the area as a National Historic Park, President Barack Obama signed a bill authorizing the Coltsville National Historic Park. The federal authorization laid the groundwork for a "new type of National Park," characterized by a small staff, modest property ownership by the National Park Service and dependence on community partnerships.

== Description ==
The Coltsville District is a large area south of downtown Hartford, bounded on the north by Wyllys and Charter Oak Avenues, on the east by Van Dyke Avenue and the Connecticut River, on the south by Warwarme Avenue, and on the west by Wethersfield Avenue. The district encompasses the entire community planned around the Colt Armory, including Armsmear, tenement housing and community facilities such as the Church of the Good Shepherd and Hartford's Colt Park.

== History ==
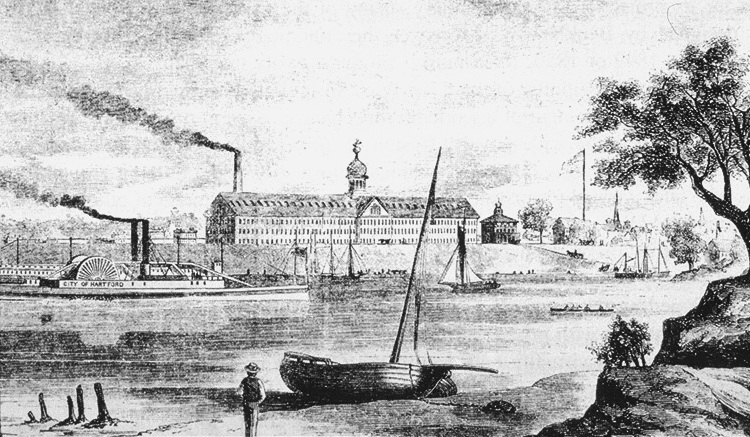
Colt's Armory, viewed from the east; from an 1857 engraving

The greatest influence on the development of Sheldon/Charter Oak and South Green just south of downtown Hartford was Samuel Colt and his wife Elizabeth Colt. Although Colt is often considered the father of the Connecticut River Valley industrial revolution, there were in fact a handful of small outfits already in operation by the time Colt purchased a large tract of land in the area in the 1840s, where he opened his first factory in 1848. Inspired by what he had seen during a trip to London in 1851, Colt embarked upon one of the boldest real estate development campaigns in Hartford's history. His intention to build an industrial community to house his workers adjacent to the Colt Armory. By 1856, it was a city within a city, where workers of many nationalities and religions worked, lived and recreated alongside one another. Colt's complex also included the largest armory in the world, wharf and ferry facilities on the Connecticut River.

While not the largest, the most prominent or the most tightly controlled of America's 19th century company towns, Coltsville was among the country's first, and easily the most advanced of its time. He established a ten-hour day for employees, installed washing stations in the factory, mandated a one-hour lunch break, and built the Charter Oak Hall, where employees could enjoy games, newspapers, and discussion rooms. Colt ran his plant with a military-like discipline, he would fire workers for tardiness, sub-par work or even suggesting improvements to his designs.

Crowning the hilltop in the northwest corner of the complex was Armsmear, an enormous Italian villa Colt built for himself and his wife in 1857 that was likely contemporary Hartford's most luxurious structure by a significant margin.

After a major fire destroyed the original armory in 1864, Colt's widow had the original armory rebuilt including the original structure's most dramatic feature: the blue onion dome with gold stars, topped by a gold orb and a rampant colt, the original symbol of Colt Manufacturing Company. Visible to commuters on I-91, the Colt Armory stands a monument to Hartford's first "celebrity industrialist," and the once mighty empire he created.

Samuel Colt is known as the inventor of the revolver, but he was also an innovator in the development of factory methods and processes, enabling the mass production of his high-precision products. His business practices were also innovative, involving not just a shrewd use of patents to protect his products, but also new developments in marketing and business organization to create a highly successful business which long outlived him. This success was propagated in part by his wife Elizabeth, who continued to run his businesses for forty years after his death in 1862.

Colt hired Elisha K. Root as his chief mechanic in setting up the plant's machinery. Root had been successful in an earlier venture automating the production of axes and made, bought, or improved jigs, fixtures and profile machinery for Colt. Over the years he developed specialized machinery for stock turning or cutting the rifling in gun barrels. Historian Barbara Tucker credits Root as "the first to build special purpose machinery and apply it to the manufacture of a commercial product". Colt historian Herbert G. Houze, wrote, "had it not been for Root's inventive genius, Colt's dream of mass production would never have been realized".

Thus, Colt's factory was the first to make use of the concept known as the assembly line. The idea was not new but was never successful in industry at the time because of the lack of interchangeable parts. Root's machinery changed that for Colt, since the machines completed as much as 80% of the work and less than 20% of the parts required hand fitting and filing. Colt's revolvers were made by machine, but he insisted on final hand finishing and polishing of his revolvers to impart a handmade feel. Colt turned to artisan gun makers from Bavaria and developed a commercial use for Waterman Ormsby's grammagraph to produce "roll-die" engraving on steel, particularly on the cylinders. He hired Bavarian engraver Gustave Young for fine hand engraving on his more "custom" pieces. In an attempt to attract skilled European-immigrant workers to his plant, Colt built homes modeled after a village in Potsdam. In an effort to stem the flooding from the river he planted German osiers, a type of willow tree in a 2 miles (3.2 km) long dike. He subsequently built a factory to manufacture wicker furniture made from these trees.

=== Legacy ===
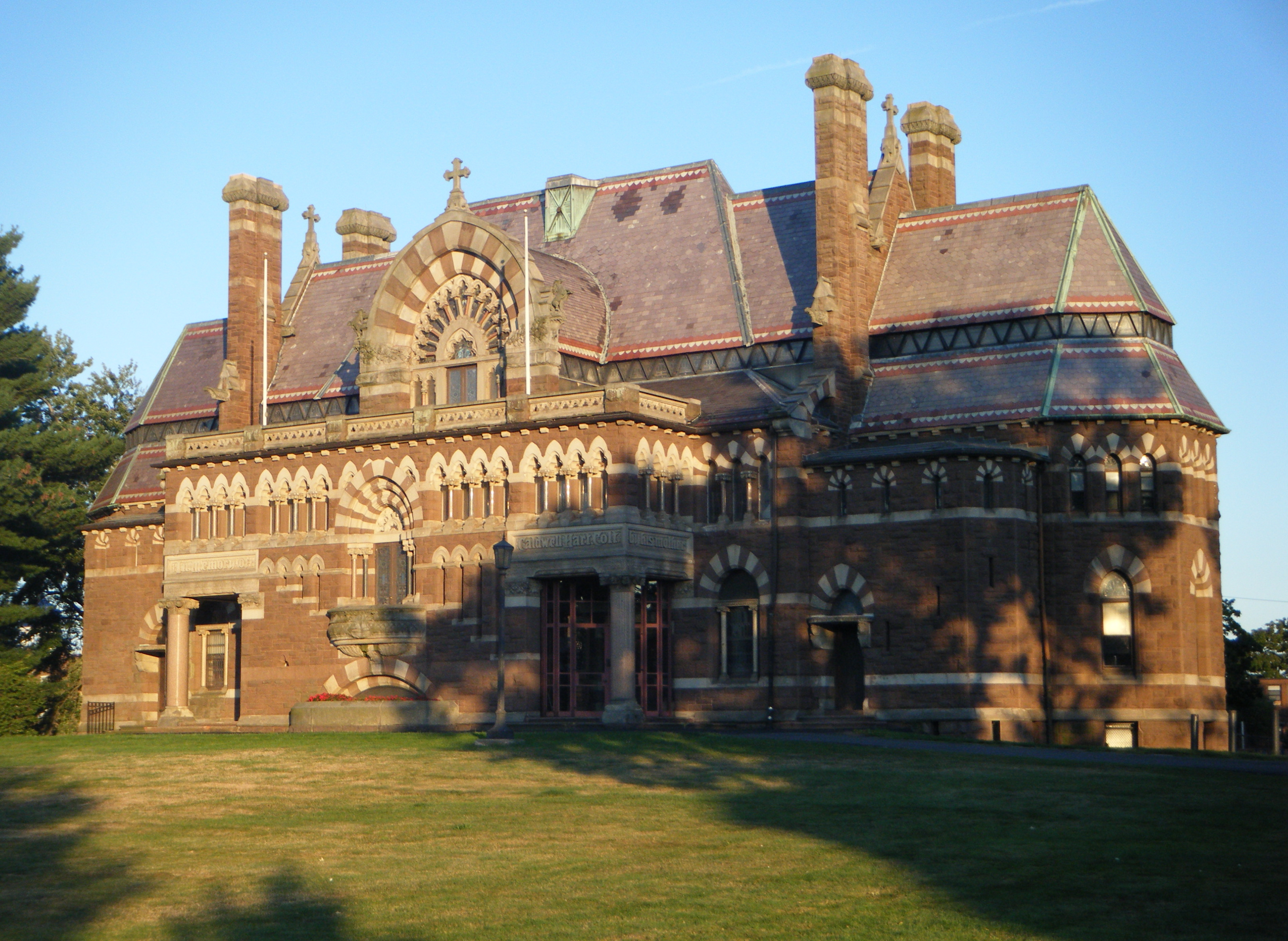
Church of the Good Shepherd Parish house, a contributing property to the district

Following her son's death, Elizabeth Colt commissioned the Church of the Good Shepherd in 1896 as a monument to his life. Built in High Victorian Gothic style, architectural features include a variety of gun parts, such as bullet molds, gunsights and cylinders. This unusual characteristic makes it likely the only church in the world with a gun motif.

When Elizabeth Colt died in 1904, she willed the majority of her estate, Armsmear, to the City of Hartford for use as a public park. Today, the 105-acre (42 ha) Colt Park services the community with a number of athletic fields, playgrounds, a swimming pool, playground, and Trinity Health Stadium.

In December 2014, legislation was passed authorizing the creation of the Coltsville National Historical Park incorporating much of the landmarked area. The park has not yet been established and the National Park Service is awaiting land transfer.

== See also ==
- Colt Armory
- List of National Historic Landmarks in Connecticut
- National Register of Historic Places listings in Hartford, Connecticut
