= Colt Armory =

- Colt Industrial District
- U.S. National Register of Historic Places
- U.S. Historic district
- U.S. National Historic Landmark District – Contributing property
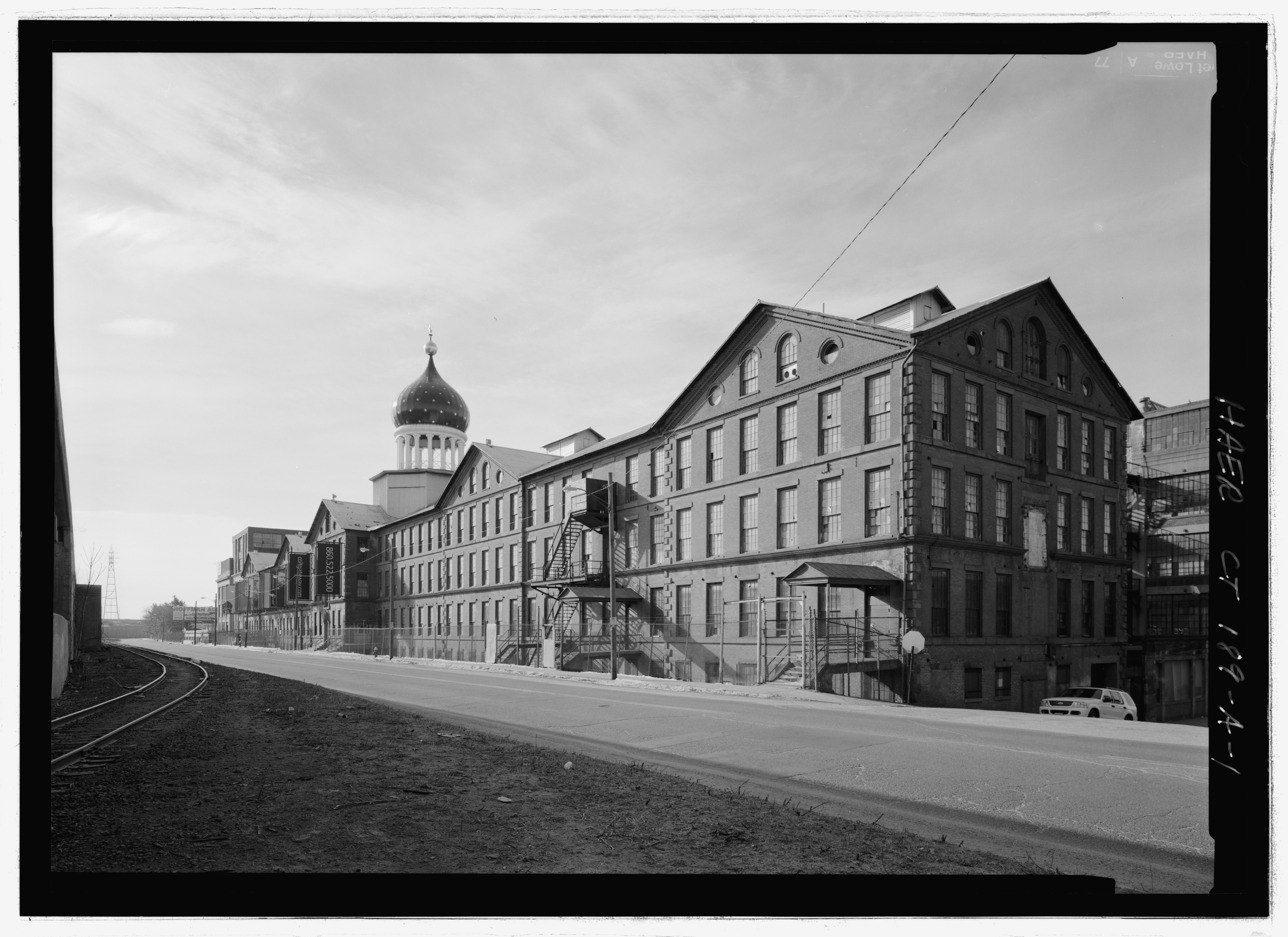
- The East Armory Building

- Location within Connecticut Location within the United States
- Location: Roughly bounded by Wawarme, Wethersfield, Hendricxsen, Van Dyke Avenues, and Stonington, Masseek, and Sequassen Streets, Hartford, Connecticut
- Coordinates: 41°45′23.43″N 72°39′50.76″W
- Area: 130 acres (53 ha)
- Built: 1855
- Part of: Coltsville Historic District (ID66000802)
- NRHP reference No.: 76001987

Significant dates
- Added to NRHP: June 8, 1976
- Designated NHLDCP: July 22, 2008

The Colt Armory is a historic factory complex for the manufacture of firearms, created by Samuel Colt. It is located in Hartford, Connecticut along the Connecticut River, and as of 2008 is part of the Coltsville Historic District, named a National Historic Landmark District. It is slated to become part of Coltsville National Historical Park, now undergoing planning by the National Park Service.

== History ==
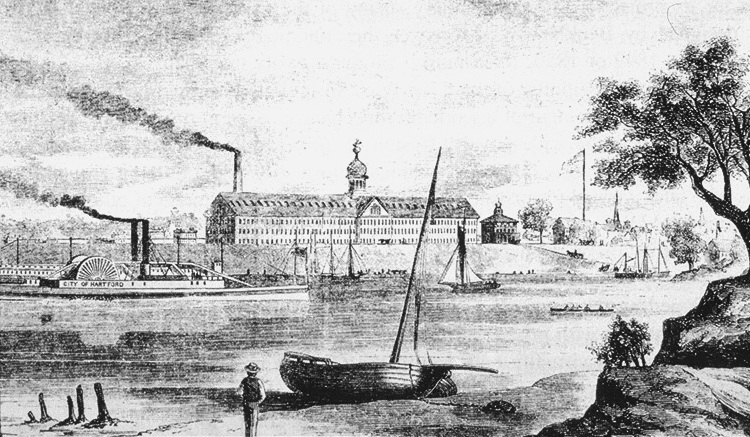
Colt Armory, original East Armory in 1857

The armory was built on a 260-acre (110 ha) site beginning in 1855. Low-lying, often flooded meadows were set off from the river by a 2-mile (3.2 km) dike and drained. The dike and earliest armory buildings were completed in 1855, and Colt's mansion Armsmear was constructed the following year on a hill overlooking the armory.

Shortly afterwards Colt added 20 six/eight-family houses (10 of which survive) on Huyshope and Van Block Avenues for skilled workers. Colt's 1855 East Armory was almost totally destroyed by a disastrous fire in 1864; only two small outbuildings remain of this original construction (the Forge and the Foundry). The West Armory (built 1861) was demolished before World War II.

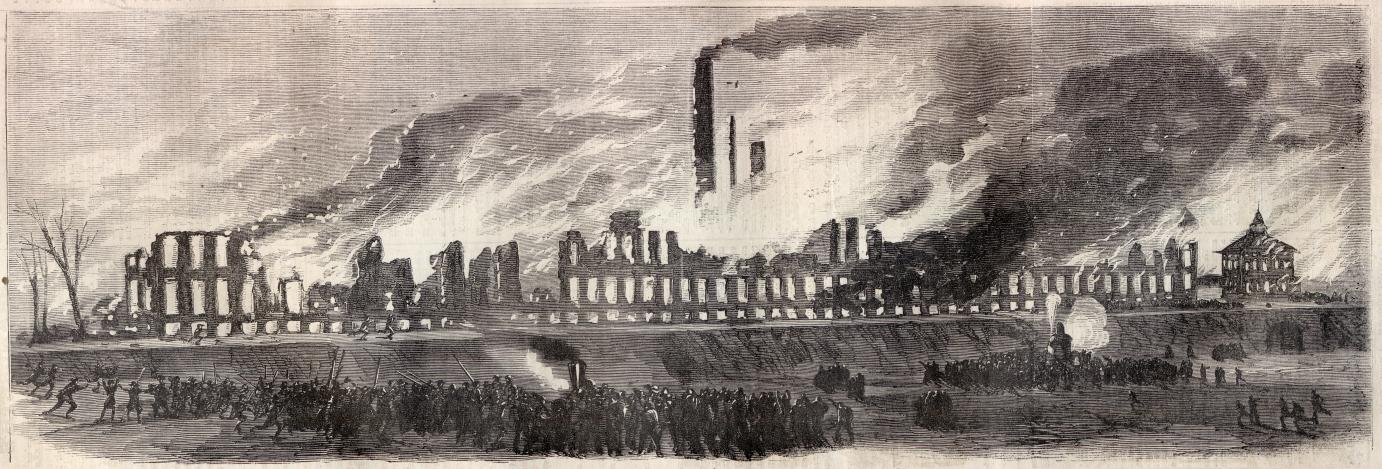
Destruction of the original East Armory by fire, 1864

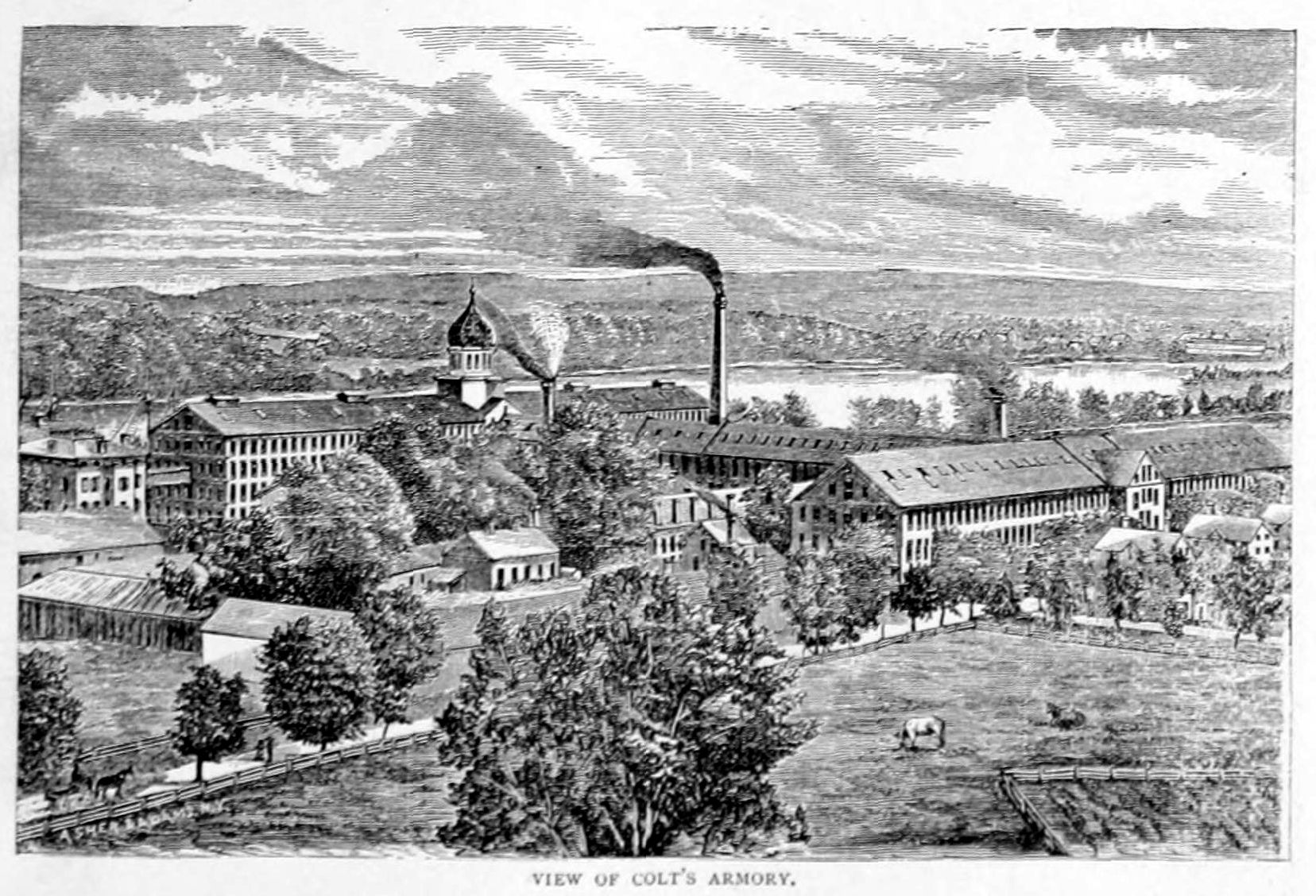
Colt's Armory, 1896.

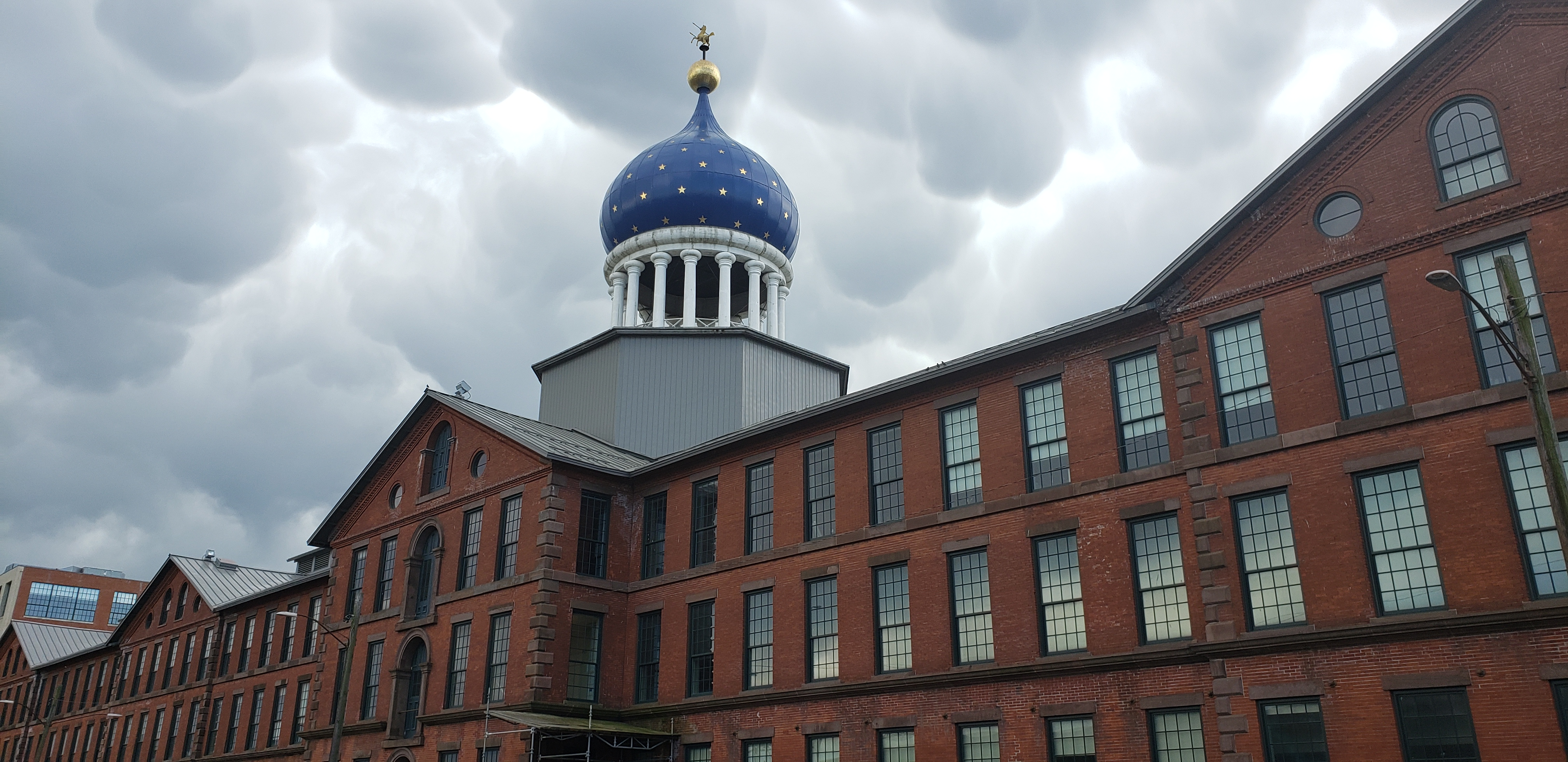
Colt Armory in 2021

After the 1864 fire, the East Armory was rebuilt on its predecessor's foundation, to designs by General William B. Franklin, the company's general manager and a former U.S. Army engineer, and completed in 1867. It is a 5-story brick structure with brownstone accents, 508 by 61 feet (155 by 19 m) in dimensions, with its main entrance in the center of a five-bay pavilion projecting 10 feet (3 m) from the main facade. The building is capped with a distinctive onion-shaped, sheet metal dome, painted deep blue with gold stars, and resembling that of the 1855 armory. A gilded ball sits atop the dome, above which is a gilded fiberglass replica of the original "Rampant Colt". (Its gilded wood original is now on display at the Museum of Connecticut History at Connecticut State Library.) The blue dome of the Colt Armory is a well known landmark for travelers passing through Hartford, as it sits directly adjacent to Interstate 91.

Four Porter-Allen steam engines drove the armory's machine tools through a maze of shafts and belts. Mark Twain, who lived in the nearby Mark Twain House, visited Colt's armory in 1868 and described it thus: "It comprises a great range of tall brick buildings, and on every floor is a dense wilderness of strange iron machines… a tangled forest of rods, bars, pulleys, wheels, and all the imaginable and unimaginable forms of mechanism… It must have required more brains to invent all those things than would serve to stock 50 Senates like ours."

Today the factory complex includes: the Forge Shop and the Foundry (from the original 1855 factory); the East Armory with its distinctive blue onion dome, rebuilt in 1867; the South and North Armories (1921), the Machine Shop, Warehouse, Power Plant, and Garage, built in 1916 to accommodate World War I production; and the World War II Office Building (1942). The state of Connecticut has been trying to place the complex under the administration of the National Park Service as a National Historical Park, similar to designation granted the Lowell National Historical Park, another important site in the history of American industrialism.

In 1994, Colt's Manufacturing Company vacated the Hartford complex amid financial difficulties, consolidating operations at a West Hartford, CT location opened in the 1960s. A former tenant in the East Armory, U.S. Fire Arms Manufacturing Company, originally manufactured replicas of historic Colt pistols, before diversifying and discontinuing the replicas in 2011.

== Colt's Armory Printing Press ==
In addition to Colt firearms, the factory produced a number of items under contract for other companies. The most famous of these was a letterpress printing press designed by Merrit Gally, known as the Universal. From 1873 to 1902, the Armory manufactured a series of these presses that developed a reputation as the finest hand-fed platen press ever made (a reputation which survives to the present). These presses eventually became known generically as "Colt's Armory" presses, although they were distributed under names including Colt's Armory, Universal, Victoria, Hartford, National and Laureate. The fascinating history of the design, production, sales and business battles behind these storied presses was summarized in a 1983 article in the typographic journal Type & Press.

== See also ==
- National Register of Historic Places listings in Hartford, Connecticut
