= Armsmear =

Historic house in Connecticut, United States

- Samuel Colt Home
- U.S. National Historic Landmark District – Contributing property
- U.S. Historic district – Contributing property
- Armsmear

- Location within Connecticut Location within the United States
- Location: 80 Wethersfield Avenue, Hartford, Connecticut
- Coordinates: 41°45′13.89″N 72°40′29.03″W
- Built: 1855
- Architectural style: Italianate
- Part of: Coltsville Historic District (ID66000802); South Green Historic District (ID02001453)

Significant dates
- Added to NRHP: November 13, 1966
- Designated NHLDCP: November 13, 1966
- Designated CP: November 17, 1977

Armsmear ("meadow of arms"), also known as the Samuel Colt Home, is a historic house located at 80 Wethersfield Avenue in Hartford, Connecticut. It was the family home of firearm manufacturer Samuel Colt. Armsmear was listed as a National Historic Landmark in 1976; this designation was expanded in 2008 to form the Coltsville Historic District, a National Historic Landmark District.

== History ==
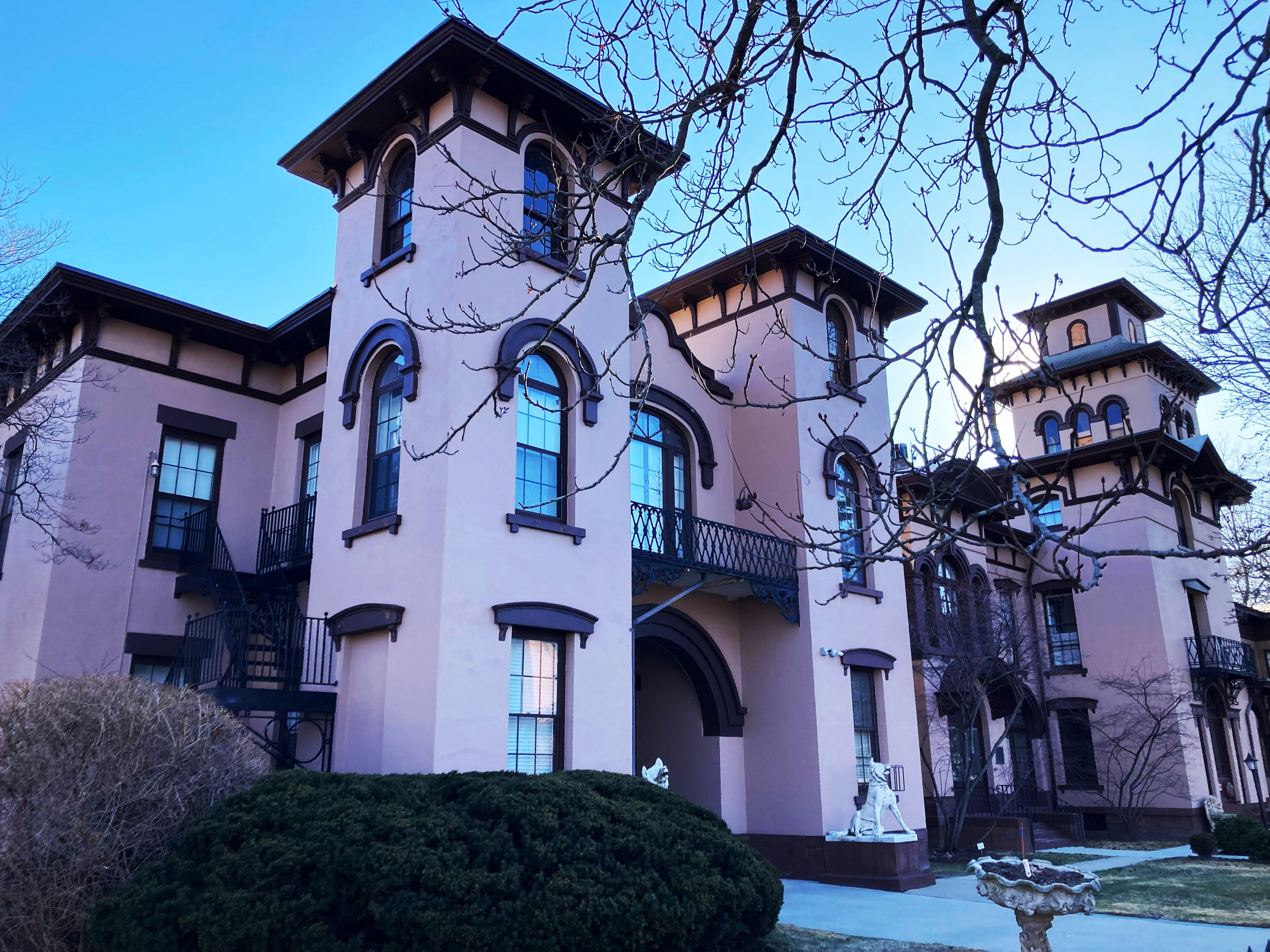
Armsmear in January 2025

Armsmear was planned for Colt's 1856 marriage to Elizabeth Hart Jarvis and constructed in 1856 to designs by an unknown architect, possibly local architect Octavius Jordan or factory engineer H. A. G. Pomeroy, on grounds overlooking the recently completed Colt Armory. It was described by a contemporary thus: "an Italian villa in stone, massive, noble, refined, yet not carrying out any decided principle of architecture, it is like its originator, bold and unusual in its combinations." It features a low-pitched roof, heavy bracketed cornice, round-arched doors and windows, iron balconies, Italianate tower and details, and Turkish domes and pinnacles.

The Colts occupied Armsmear in 1857 and promptly began to develop its gardens. Landscape architects Cleveland and Copeland provided the plans. Unusual, glass-domed conservatories, inspired by London's Crystal Palace, were added in 1861–1862. Ultimately the estate contained some 2,600 feet (790 m) of greenhouses, as well as ponds, fountains, and a deer park.

The house and manicured grounds were the primary residence of Samuel Colt and his family. The Colts entertained lavishly at the estate, holding large parties that were the highlight of the Hartford society season. Samuel Colt lived in Armsmear for approximately 5 years from 1857 until his death in 1862. He was buried on the grounds of Armsmear near the graves of Sam and Elizabeth's young children, amidst a copse of weeping willows known as the 'Grove of Graves.' Following her husband's death, Elizabeth Hart Colt and her son Caldwell Hart Colt lived together in the large home for several decades. In 1894, Elizabeth had Samuel Colt and four of their children buried at Armsmear reinterred to Cedar Hill Cemetery.

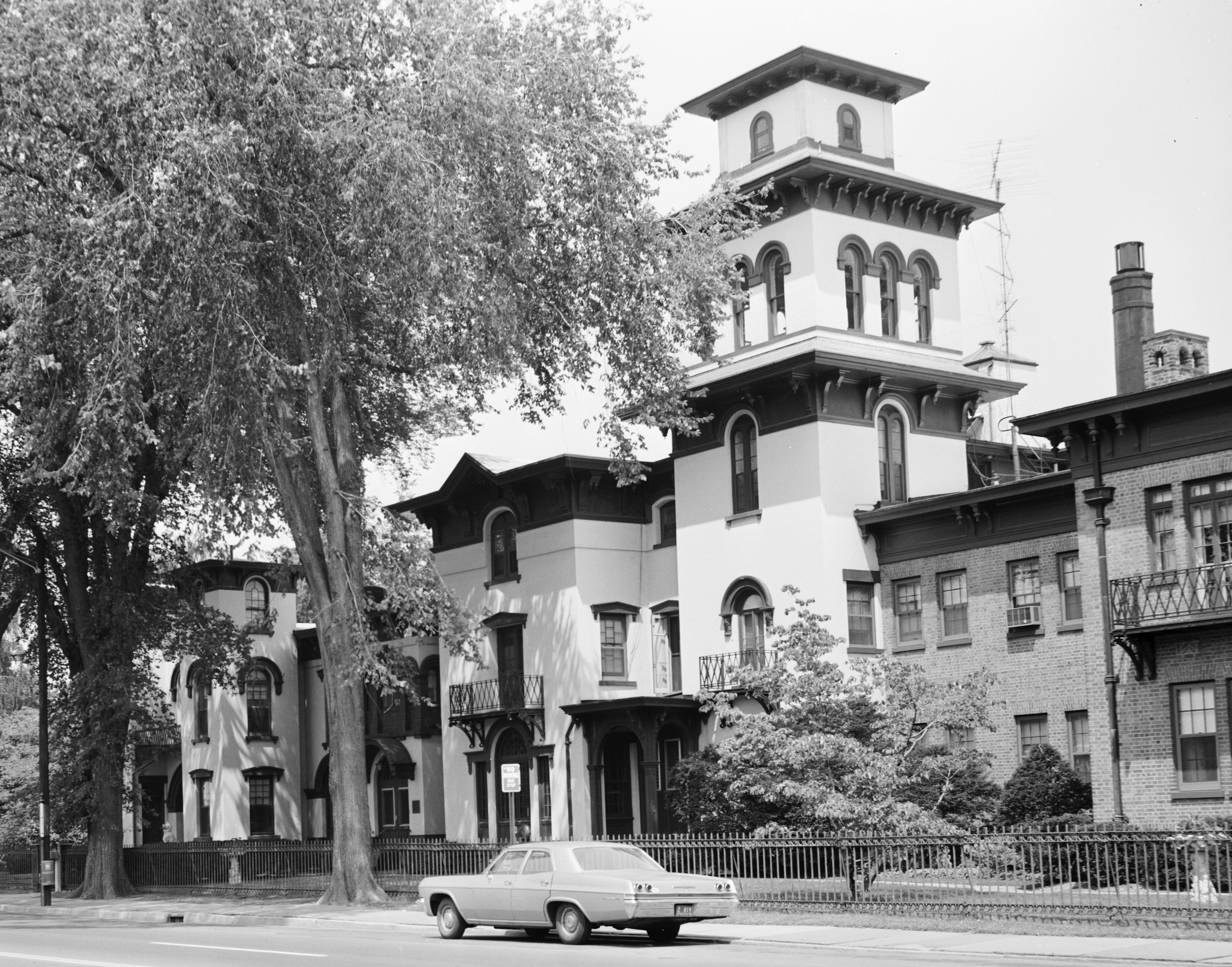
Armsmear c.1967

After Elizabeth Colt died in 1905, the house was converted to a home for Episcopal women (in 1911) under the terms of her will. The residential community to this day is administrated by the Colt Trust. She also gave 140 acres (57 ha) of Armsmear's grounds to create Hartford's Colt Park. The city has subsequently replaced the greenhouse, garden, and ponds with ball fields and a skating rink.

== Sources ==
- Historic American Buildings Survey (HABS) No. CT-357, "Samuel Colt House"
- Johnston, Phillip M. (Winter 1984). "Dialogues between Designer and Client: Furnishings Proposed by Leon Marcotte to Samuel Colt in the 1850s". Winterthur Portfolio. 19 (4): 257–275. JSTOR 1180949.
- Barnard, Henry, ed. (1866). Armsmear: The Home, The Arm, and the Armory of Samuel Colt. New York: Alvord.
- Hosley, William (1996). Colt: The Making of an American Legend. Amherst: University of Massachusetts Press. ISBN 1558490426.
