= Building at 136–138 Collins Street =

Historic house in Connecticut, United States

- U.S. National Register of Historic Places
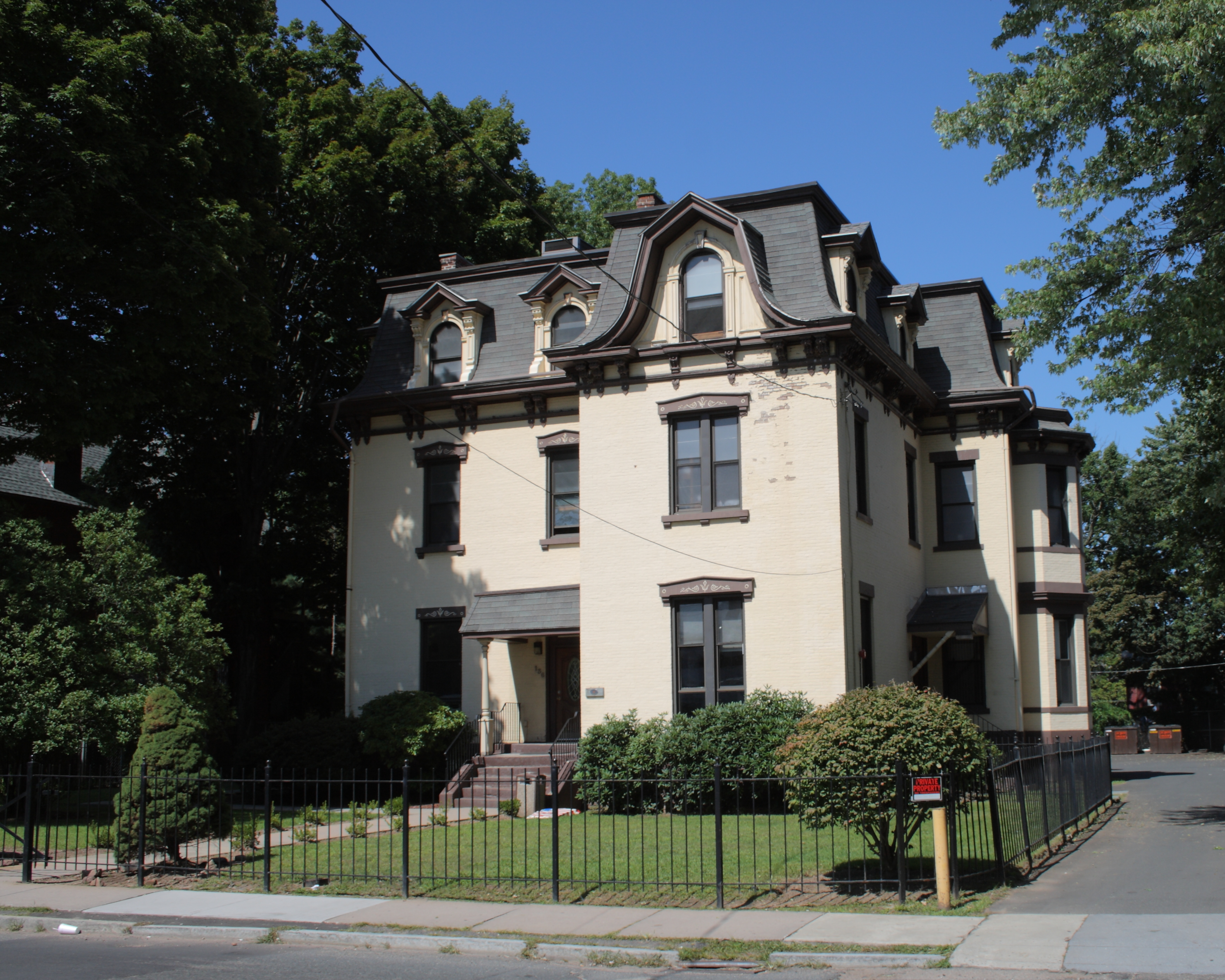

- Location within Connecticut Location within the United States
- Location: 136–138 Collins Street, Hartford, Connecticut
- Coordinates: 41°46′22″N 72°41′19″W
- Area: less than one acre
- Built: 1870
- Architectural style: Second Empire
- MPS: Asylum Hill MRA
- NRHP reference No.: 79002681
- Added to NRHP: November 29, 1979

136–138 Collins Street is an architecturally distinguished Second Empire house in Hartford. Built about 1870, it is a rare and well-preserved example of this style in the city. It was listed on the National Register of Historic Places on April 29, 1982.

== Description and history ==
136–138 Collins Street is located in Hartford's Asylum Hill neighborhood, on the north side of Collins Street east of Sumner Street. It is a 2 1/2-story brick structure, with a slate mansard roof. It is set on an elevated basement, giving it a taller than typical appearance. It is three bays wide, with its entrance in the center bay, and a two-story projecting pavilion to its right. The roof line is pierced by dormers in the mansard section that have elaborately carved surrounds and round-arch windows, that in the projecting section larger than the others. The latter dormer has a bellcast shape with a peaked hood. The roof the eaves have paired brackets. Windows are set in rectangular openings, with peaked lintels and bracketed sills.

The house was built about 1870. It probably had a more ornate front porch; the present one is a 20th-century replacement. The house was once owned by Isaac Frisbie, the superintendent of Hartford's poorhouse, which was located behind the house.

== See also ==
- Building at 142 Collins Street
- National Register of Historic Places listings in Hartford, Connecticut
