= Building at 142 Collins Street =

Historic house in Connecticut, United States

- U.S. National Register of Historic Places
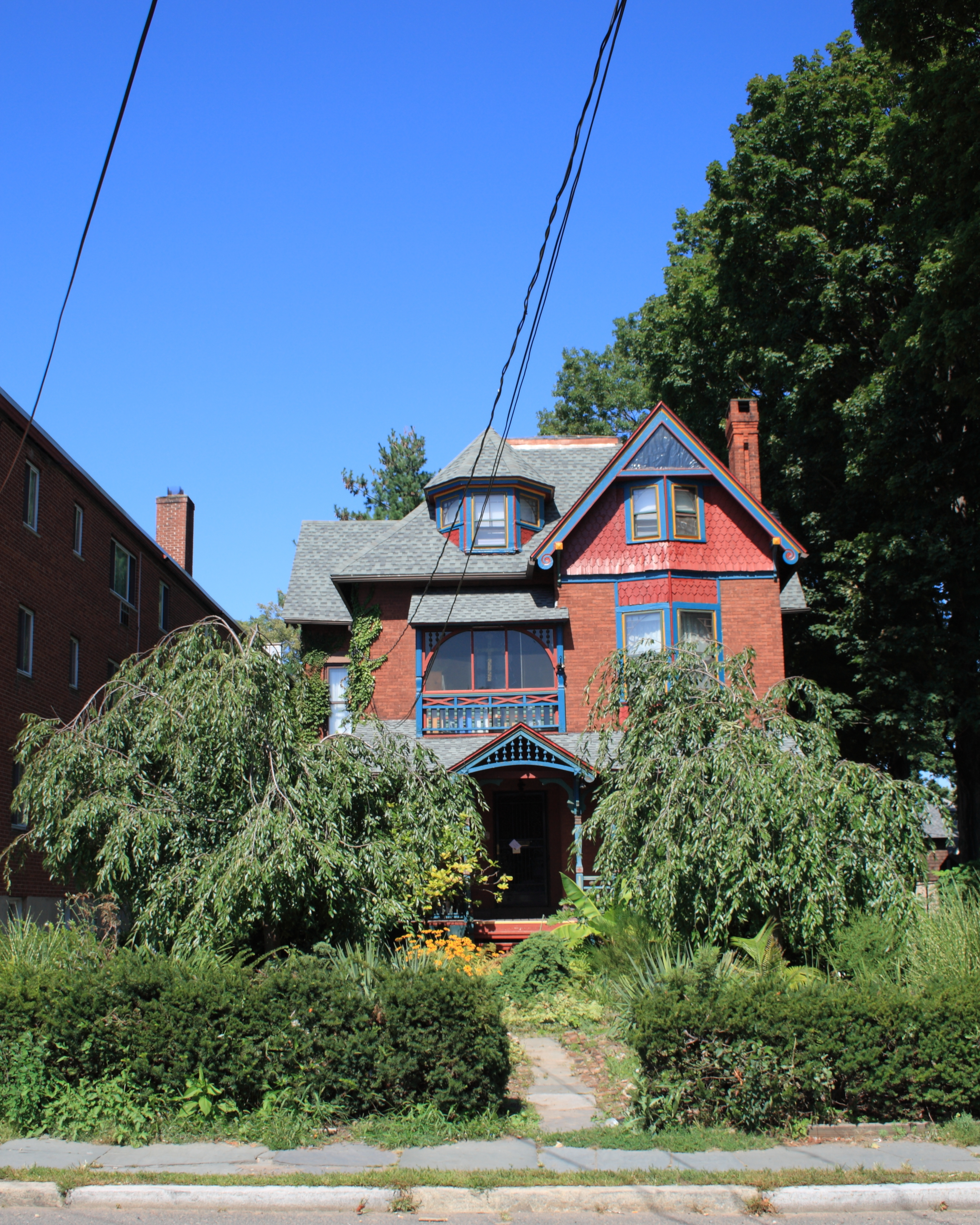

- Location within Connecticut Location within the United States
- Location: 142 Collins Street, Hartford, Connecticut
- Coordinates: 41°46′18″N 72°41′20″W
- Area: less than one acre
- Built: 1890
- Architectural style: Queen Anne
- MPS: Asylum Hill MRA
- NRHP reference No.: 79002680
- Added to NRHP: November 29, 1979

142 Collins Street is an architecturally distinguished Queen Anne Victorian house in Hartford, Connecticut. Built about 1890, it is typical of houses that were once much more common the city's Asylum Hill neighborhood. It was listed on the National Register of Historic Places on November 29, 1979.

== Description and history ==
142 Collins Street is located in Hartford's Asylum Hill area, on the north side of Collins Street east of its junction with Summer Street, opposite the main complex of The Hartford Insurance Group. It is a 2 1/2-story brick structure, with a truncated hip roof and numerous projecting gables and dormers. The front facade has porches on the first and second levels, the upper one occupying only the central bay; both have decorative spindled woodwork friezes and turned supports. A projecting gable section to the right is finished with scalloped shingles, and has a two-window angled bay.

The house was built in 1890, and is, with the neighboring house (built about 1870 in the Second Empire style, a study in architectural trends that took place during the development of Asylum Hill in the second half of the 19th century. This house is a particularly fine example of a Queen Anne Victorian executed in brick.

== See also ==
- National Register of Historic Places listings in Hartford, Connecticut
