= East Street station =

Bus station in Connecticut, United States

East Street
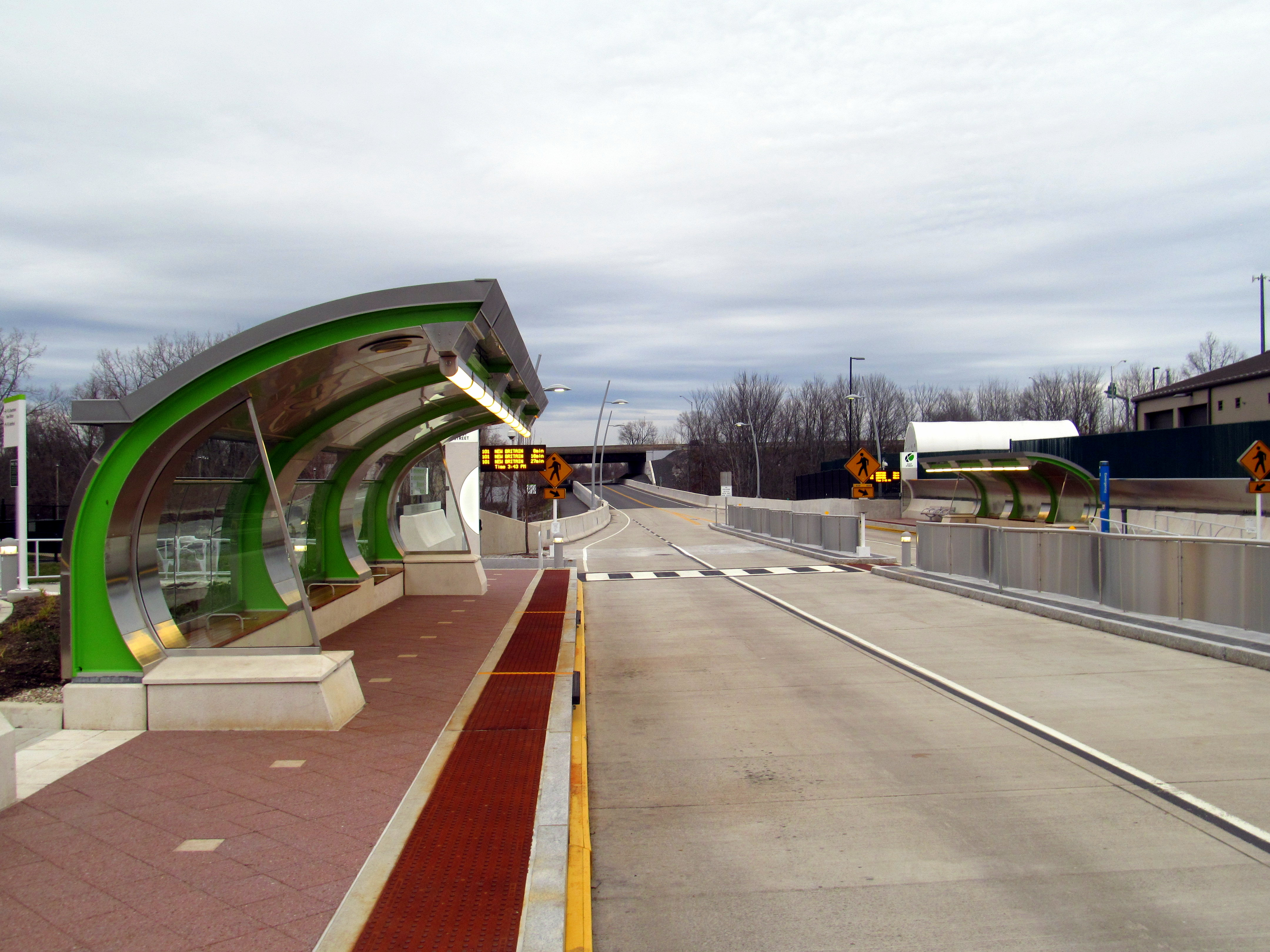
- Platforms at East Street station in December 2015

General information
- Location: East Street, New Britain, Connecticut
- Coordinates: 41.6875°N 72.7592°W
- Owner: ConnDOT
- Operator: Connecticut Transit
- Bus routes: 101, 102
- Bus stands: 2 side platforms
- Connections: 140, 144 (adjacent to busway)

Construction
- Cycle facilities: Yes
- Accessible: Yes

History
- Opened: March 28, 2015

Services
Preceding station	CT Transit	Following station
East Main Street toward Downtown New Britain	CT Fastrak	Cedar Street toward Hartford
Location

East Street is a bus rapid transit station on the CTfastrak line, located off East Street (CT-175) in New Britain, Connecticut. It opened with the line on March 28, 2015. The station consists of two side platforms serving the busway, with two center passing lanes to allow express buses to pass buses stopped at the station. Along with Cedar Street, it serves Central Connecticut State University.

The New York and New England Railroad (and predecessor Hartford, Providence and Fishkill Railroad) served a station named Pratts at Allen Street. It opened around 1860 and was closed around 1890, replaced by nearby Claytons station.
