= Kane Street station =

Kane Street
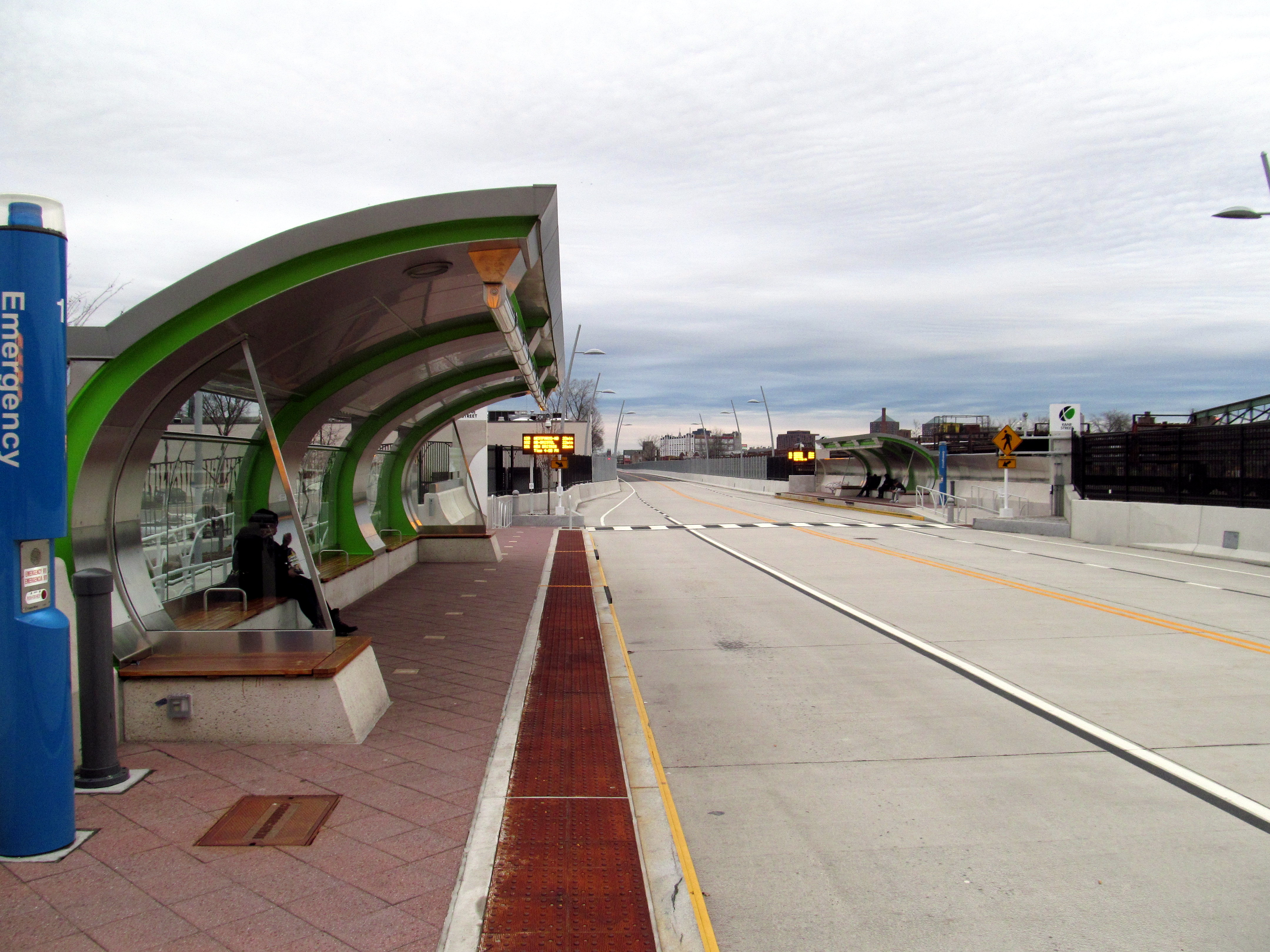
- Platforms at Kane Street in December 2015

General information
- Location: New Park Avenue and Kane Street; Hartford, Connecticut
- Coordinates: 41.7509°N 72.7086°W
- Owner: ConnDOT
- Operator: Connecticut Transit
- Bus routes: 101, 102, 121, 128
- Bus stands: 2 side platforms
- Connections: 31 (on New Park Avenue)

Construction
- Accessible: Yes

History
- Opened: March 28, 2015

Services
Preceding station	CT Transit	Following station
Flatbush Avenue toward Downtown New Britain	CT Fastrak	Parkville toward Hartford
Location

Kane Street is a bus rapid transit station on the CTfastrak line, located near the intersection of Kane Street and New Park Avenue in Hartford, Connecticut. It opened with the line on March 28, 2015. The station consists of two side platforms serving the busway, with two lanes passing in the center to allow express buses to pass buses stopped at the station.
