= Parkville station (Connecticut) =

Bus station in Connecticut, US

Parkville
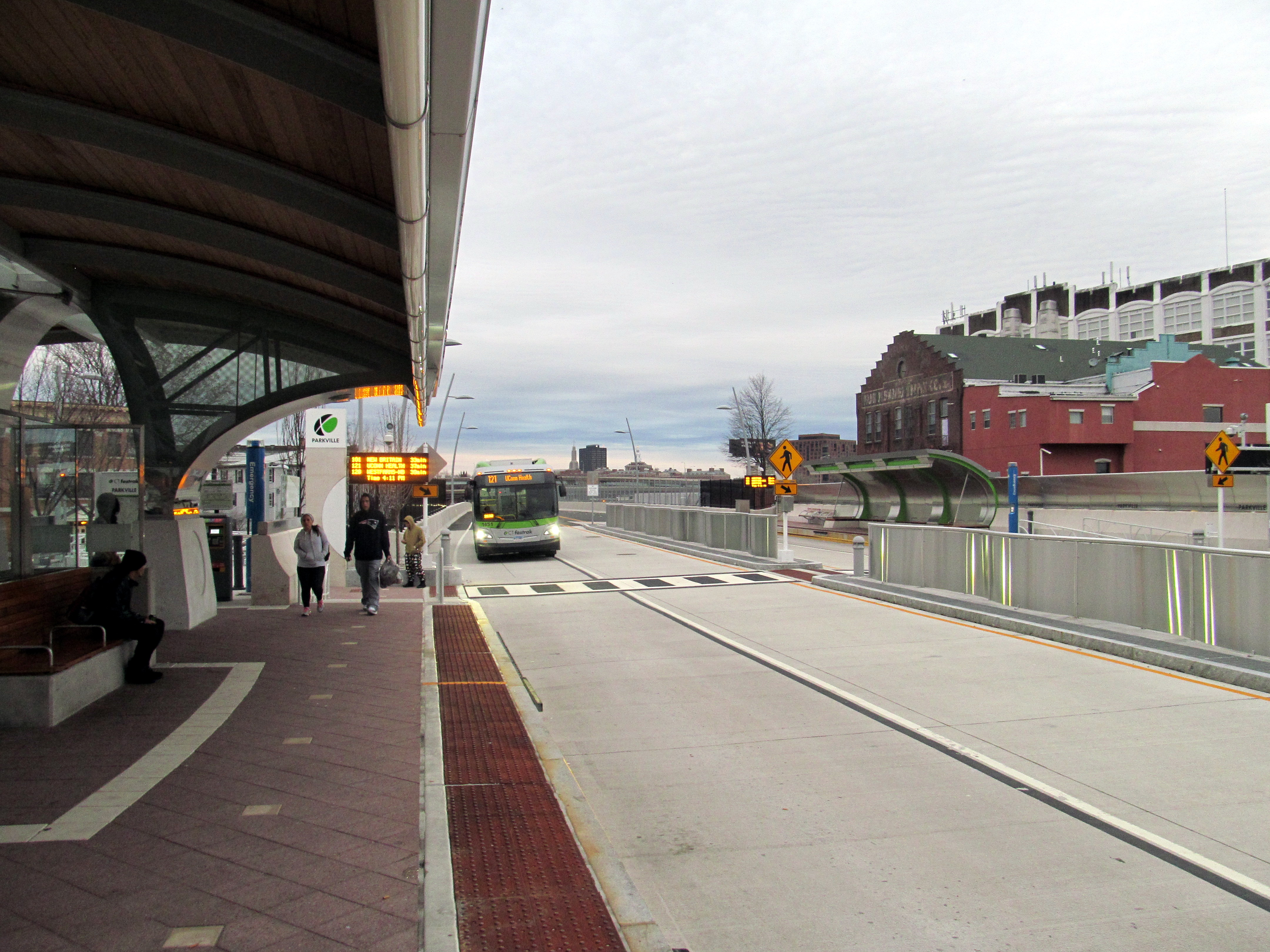
- Southbound bus at Parkville station in December 2015

General information
- Location: Park Street and Francis Avenue; Hartford, Connecticut
- Coordinates: 41°45′26″N 72°42′15″W
- Owner: ConnDOT
- Operator: Connecticut Transit
- Bus routes: 101, 102, 121, 128
- Bus stands: 2 side platforms
- Connections: 31, 33 (on Park Street)

Construction
- Accessible: Yes

History
- Opened: March 28, 2015

Services
Preceding station	CT Transit	Following station
Kane Street toward Downtown New Britain	CT Fastrak	Sigourney Street toward Hartford
Location

Parkville (known as Park Street during early planning) is a bus rapid transit station on the CTfastrak line, located near the intersection of Park Street and Francis Avenue in Hartford, Connecticut. It opened with the line on March 28, 2015. The station consists of two side platforms serving the busway, with two center passing lanes to allow express buses to pass buses stopped at the station.

The New York and New England Railroad (and predecessor Hartford, Providence and Fishkill Railroad) served a station approximately at the modern location. It opened around 1871, with a wooden depot built the next year. It may have been served until the end of passenger service between Hartford and New Britain in 1959. Trains using the parallel Springfield Line, originally built by the Hartford and New Haven Railroad, did not stop at Parkville.
