= Sigourney Street station =

Bus station in Connecticut, United States

Sigourney Street
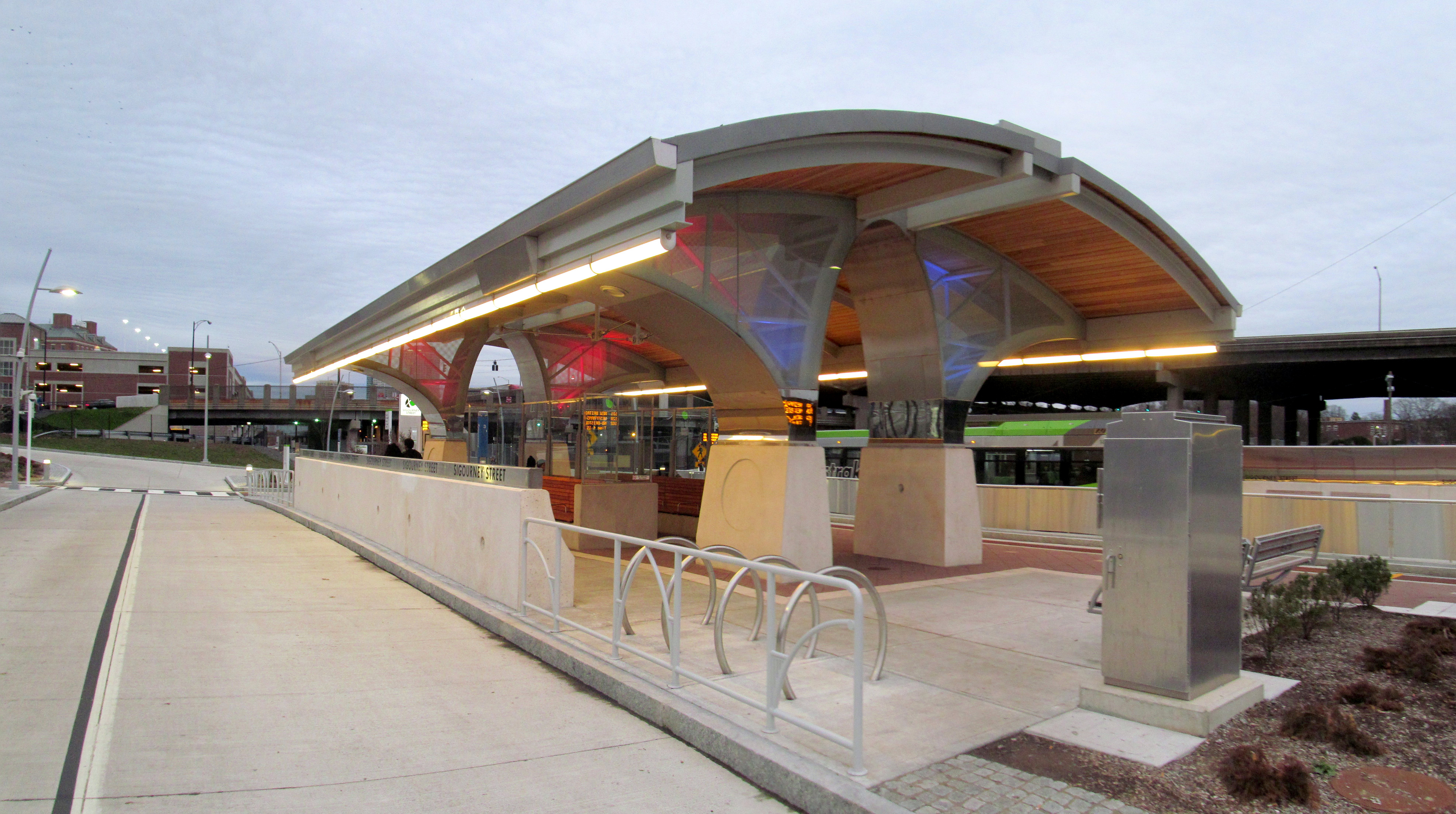
- Sigourney Street station in December 2015

General information
- Location: Sigourney and Hawthorn Streets; Hartford, Connecticut
- Coordinates: 41°45′52″N 72°41′42″W
- Owner: ConnDOT
- Operator: Connecticut Transit
- Bus routes: 101, 102, 128, 161, 923, 928
- Bus stands: 1 side platform, 2 island platforms
- Connections: 913 (on Hawthorn St)

Construction
- Cycle facilities: Yes
- Accessible: Yes

History
- Opened: March 28, 2015

Services
Preceding station	CT Transit	Following station
Parkville toward Downtown New Britain	CT Fastrak	Hartford Terminus
Location

Sigourney Street is a bus rapid transit station on the CTfastrak line, located near the intersection of Sigourney Street and Hawthorn Street in Hartford, Connecticut, near Aetna corporate headquarters. It opened with the line on March 28, 2015. The station consists of one side platform and two island platforms to serve both through buses and those which enter and leave the busway at the station.

The I-84 Hartford Project will cause a realignment of the north end of the Ctfastrak busway. Some buses will terminate at the current station, while others will serve a new "Sigourney Street South" station en route to Union Station.
