= Flatbush Avenue station (Connecticut) =

Bus rapid transit station in West Hartford, Connecticut

Flatbush Avenue
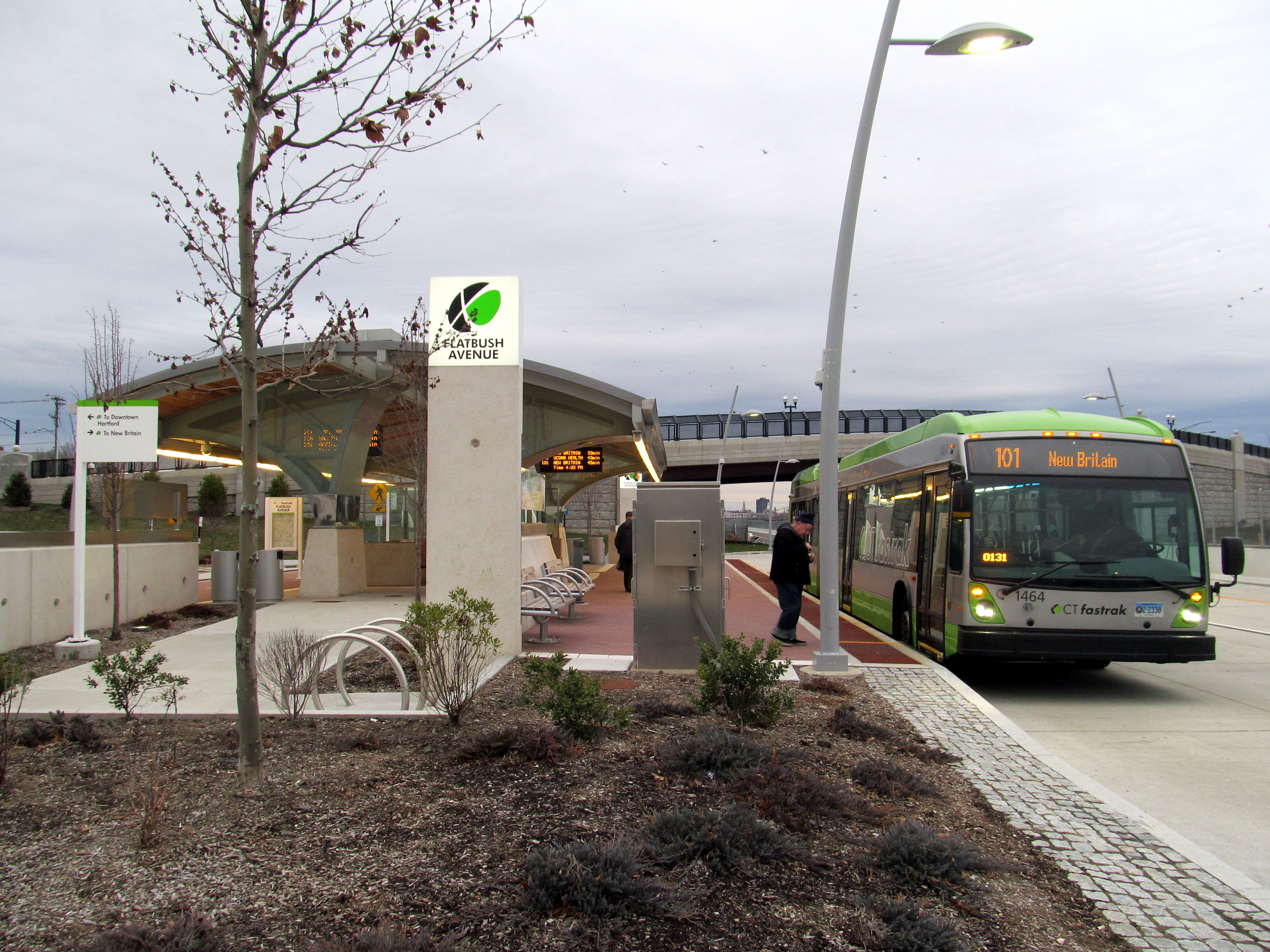
- Southbound bus at Flatbush Avenue station in December 2015

General information
- Location: New Park and Flatbush Avenues; West Hartford, Connecticut
- Coordinates: 41.7419°N 72.7164°W
- Owner: ConnDOT (bus station); Amtrak (rail line)
- Operator: Connecticut Transit
- Line: New Haven-Springfield Line
- Tracks: 2
- Bus routes: 101, 102, 121, 128
- Bus stands: 2 side platforms
- Connections: 31, 37 (on New Park Avenue); 153 (on Flatbush Avenue)

Construction
- Cycle facilities: Yes
- Accessible: Yes

History
- Opened: March 28, 2015 (CTfastrak)

Services
Preceding station	CT Transit	Following station
Elmwood toward Downtown New Britain	CT Fastrak	Kane Street toward Hartford
Planned service
Preceding station	CT Rail	Following station
Newington toward New Haven Union Station	Hartford Line (future infill station)	Hartford toward Springfield
Location

Flatbush Avenue is a bus rapid transit station on the CTfastrak line, located near the intersection of Flatbush Avenue and New Park Avenue in West Hartford, Connecticut. It opened with the line on March 28, 2015. The station consists of one island platform to the side of the busway, with passing lanes to allow express buses to pass buses stopped at the station. A CTrail Hartford Line commuter rail platform was planned to open in 2022 under the name West Hartford.

== Railroad history ==
The New York and New England Railroad (and predecessor Hartford, Providence and Fishkill Railroad) operated a station named Charter Oak Park at Oakwood Street slightly to the south, serving the Charter Oak Park racing track and the Luna Park recreation area. It opened with the track in 1874, was rebuilt in 1900, and likely closed with the racetrack in 1940. The New Haven Railroad had an adjacent Oakwood station on its parallel Springfield Line; it opened in 1874 and was closed in the late 1890s after the New Haven's purchase of the NY&NE rendered it redundant.

== Future plans ==
The Hartford Line commuter rail service between New Haven, Connecticut and Springfield, Massachusetts via Hartford commenced on June 16, 2018. It initially connects to CTfastrak at Union Station. Hartford Line stations adjacent to the CTfastrak stops at West Hartford (Flatbush Avenue) and Newington Junction are planned to open later.

The 2012 environmental assessment for the Hartford Line included preliminary plans for four infill stations including West Hartford and Newington Junction; although they were not yet funded, this would allow future planning and construction to be expedited. On January 12, 2015, the state announced that $5.75 million in funding would be made available for environmental mitigation and design at ten Hartford Line and New Haven Line stations, including design funding for Hartford Line platforms at West Hartford and Newington Junction. In February 2017, the state announced an additional $50 million in funds, including money to complete design of West Hartford station. Design was to be completed by 2020. The state aimed to construct all infill stations on the line by 2022. As of January 2025, the West Hartford station is in design and estimated to cost $70.5 million to build.
