= Cedar Street station =

Cedar Street
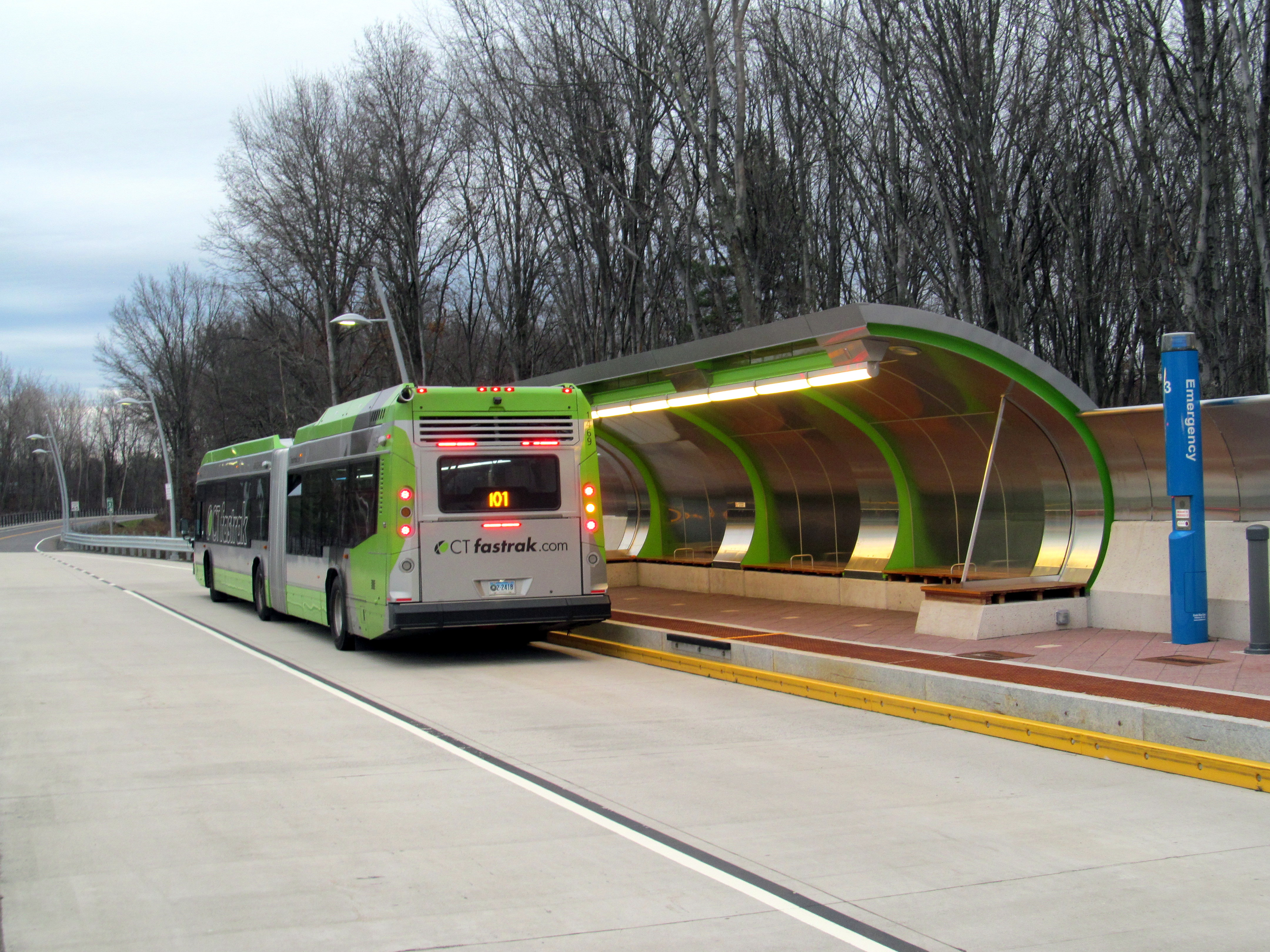
- Northbound bus at Cedar Street station in December 2015

General information
- Location: Myra Cohen Way and Fenn Road; Newington, Connecticut
- Coordinates: 41.6964°N 72.7544°W
- Owner: ConnDOT
- Operator: Connecticut Transit
- Bus routes: 101, 102
- Bus stands: 2 side platforms
- Connections: 69F, 121, 140, 144 (on Myrna Cohen Way)

Construction
- Parking: Yes
- Cycle facilities: Yes
- Accessible: Yes

History
- Opened: March 28, 2015

Services
Preceding station	CT Transit	Following station
East Street toward Downtown New Britain	CT Fastrak	Newington Junction toward Hartford
Location

Cedar Street is a bus rapid transit station on the CTfastrak line, located near the intersection of Cedar Street (CT-175) and Fenn Road in Newington, Connecticut. It opened with the line on March 28, 2015. The station consists of two side platforms serving the busway, with two center passing lanes to allow express buses to pass buses stopped at the station. Along with East Street, it serves Central Connecticut State University.

The New York and New England Railroad (and predecessor Hartford, Providence and Fishkill Railroad) served a station named Claytons at Cedar Street. It opened around 1872, supplementing and ultimately replacing Pratts station, and was closed sometime after 1915.

An access road for the station, Myra Cohen Way, is named for longtime Newington councilwoman Myra Cohen.
