= Newington Junction station =

Newington Junction
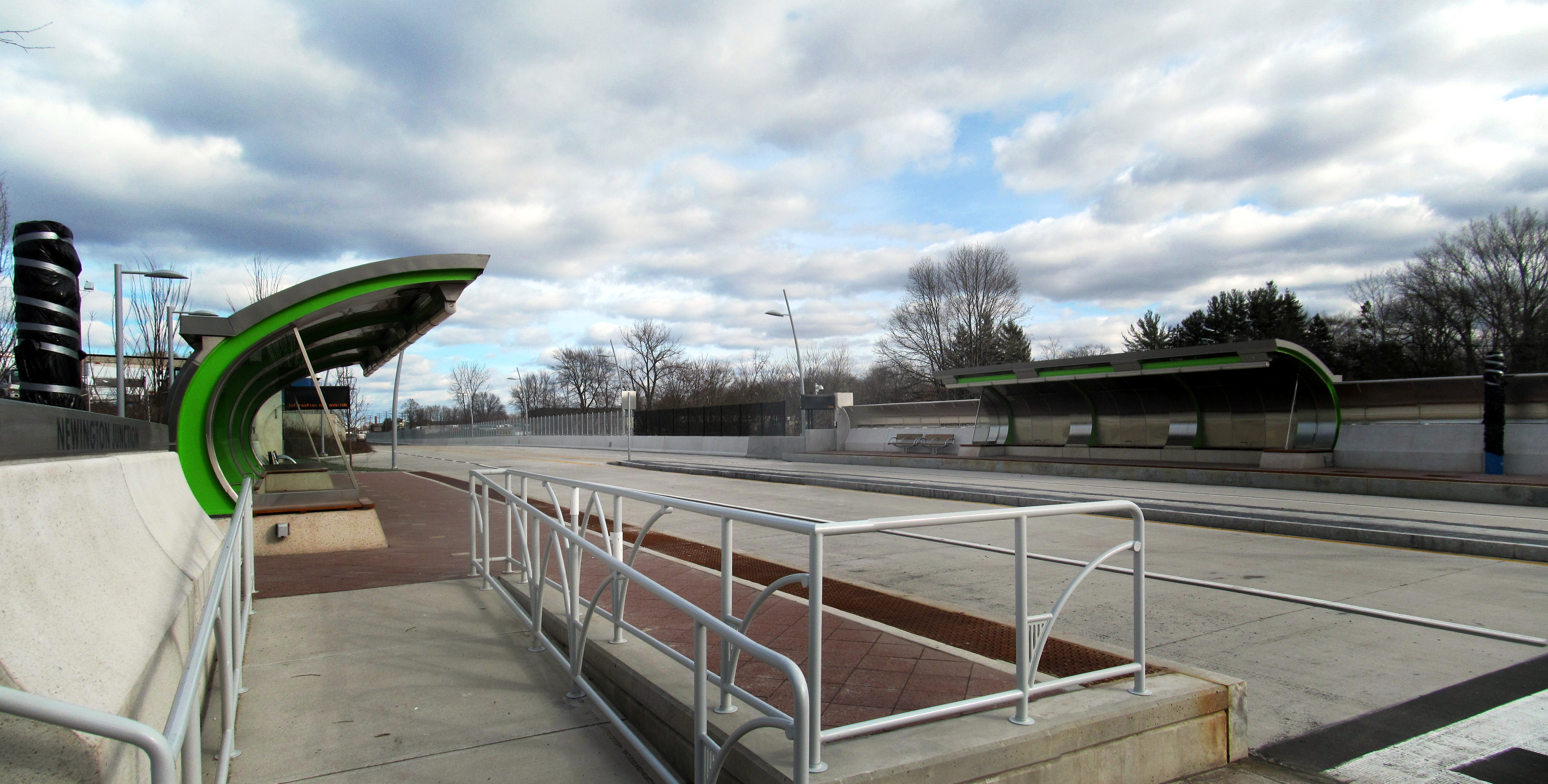
- Platforms under construction in December 2014

General information
- Location: Willard Avenue and West Hill Road; Newington, Connecticut
- Coordinates: 41.7167°N 72.7362°W
- Owner: ConnDOT (bus station); Amtrak (rail line)
- Operator: Connecticut Transit
- Line: New Haven-Springfield Line
- Tracks: 2
- Bus routes: 101, 102, 121, 140F
- Bus stands: 2 side platforms
- Connections: 69 (on Willard Avenue)

Construction
- Parking: 28 spaces
- Cycle facilities: Yes
- Accessible: Yes

History
- Opened: March 28, 2015 (CTfastrak)
- Opening: Future (CTrail, planned)

Services
Preceding station	CT Transit	Following station
Cedar Street toward Downtown New Britain	CT Fastrak	Elmwood toward Hartford
Planned service
Preceding station	CT Rail	Following station
Berlin toward New Haven Union Station	Hartford Line	Hartford toward Springfield
Berlin toward New Haven Union Station	Hartford Line	Flatbush Avenue (proposed) toward Springfield
- Newington Junction Railroad Depot
- U.S. National Register of Historic Places
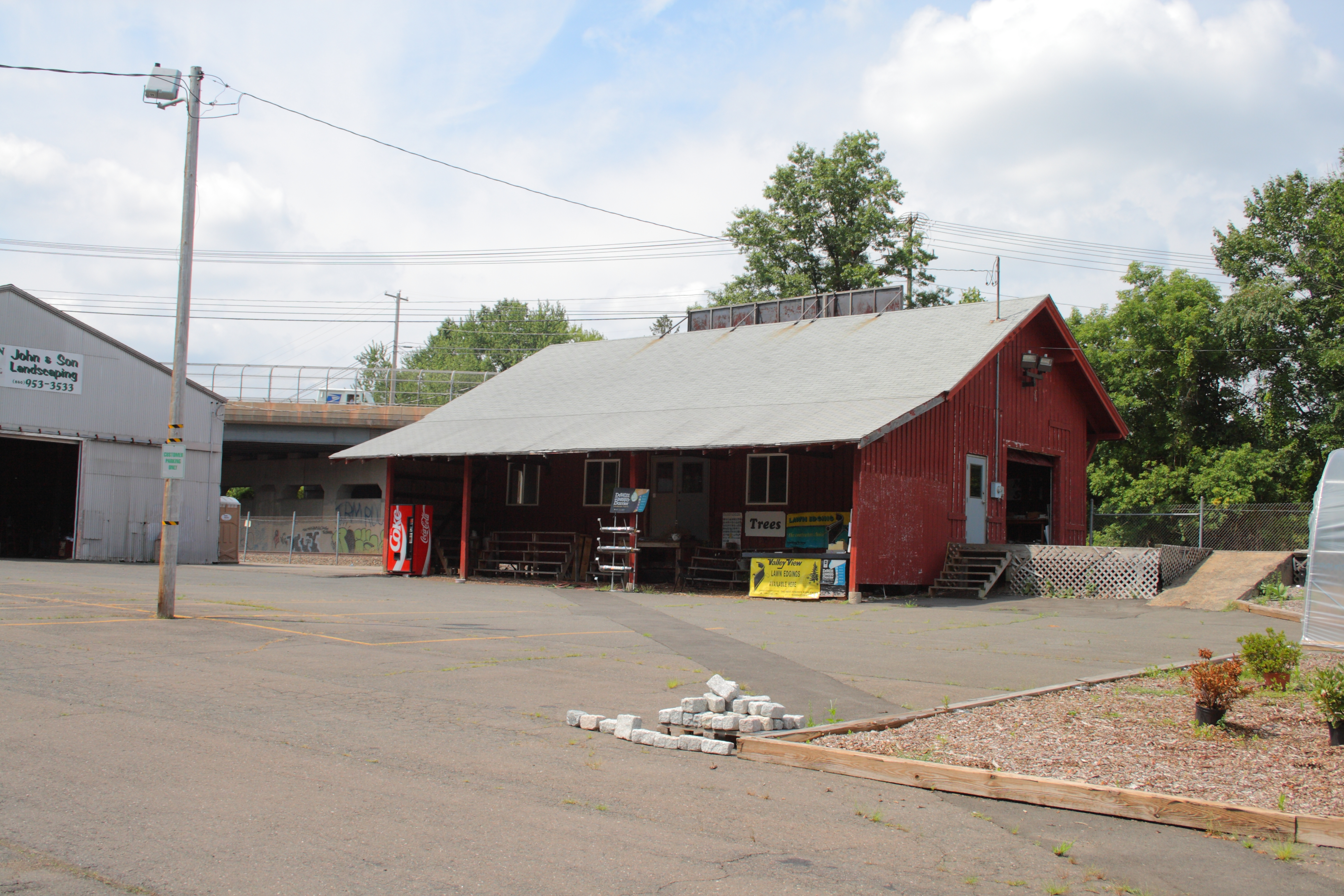
- 1890-built New Haven Railroad freight house
- Interactive map of Newington Junction Railroad Depot
- Location: 160 Willard and 200 Francis Avenues, Newington, Connecticut
- Coordinates: 41°42′55″N 72°44′13″W
- Area: 3 acres (1.2 ha)
- Built: 1890 (NYNH&H freight house); 1891 (NY&NE station)
- Architectural style: Stick/Eastlake
- MPS: Newington Junction MRA
- NRHP reference No.: 86003478
- Added to NRHP: December 22, 1986
Location

Newington Junction is a bus rapid transit station on the CTfastrak line opened in 2015 located off Willard Avenue (Route 173) in the Newington Junction neighborhood of Newington, Connecticut.

A new commuter rail station named Newington, to be located adjacent to the bus station, is also planned as later phase of the CTrail Hartford Line.

The bus station and surrounding neighborhood are named for the NRHP listed Newington Junction Railroad Depot building and freight house, built on the site in the 1890s to replace an 1850s station. Passenger rail service lasted until approximately 1959. The CTfastrak busway follows the previously rail banked right-of-way for the NY&NE Newington Secondary branch that joined the New Haven–Springfield mainline at the eponymous rail junction.

== History ==
=== Railroad service ===
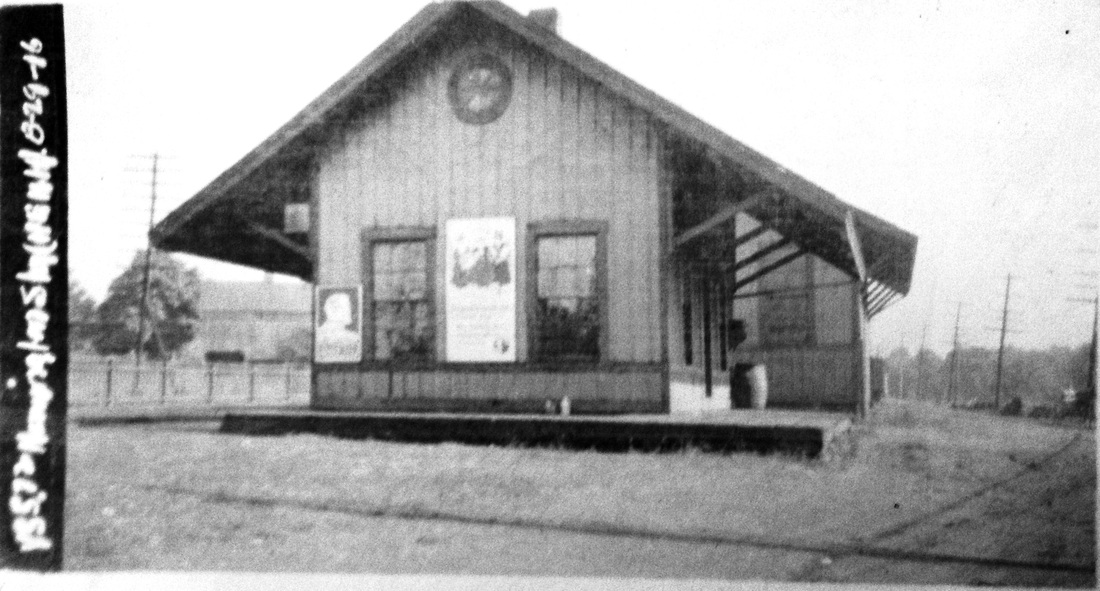
1916 valuation image of the 1890-built NYNH&H station

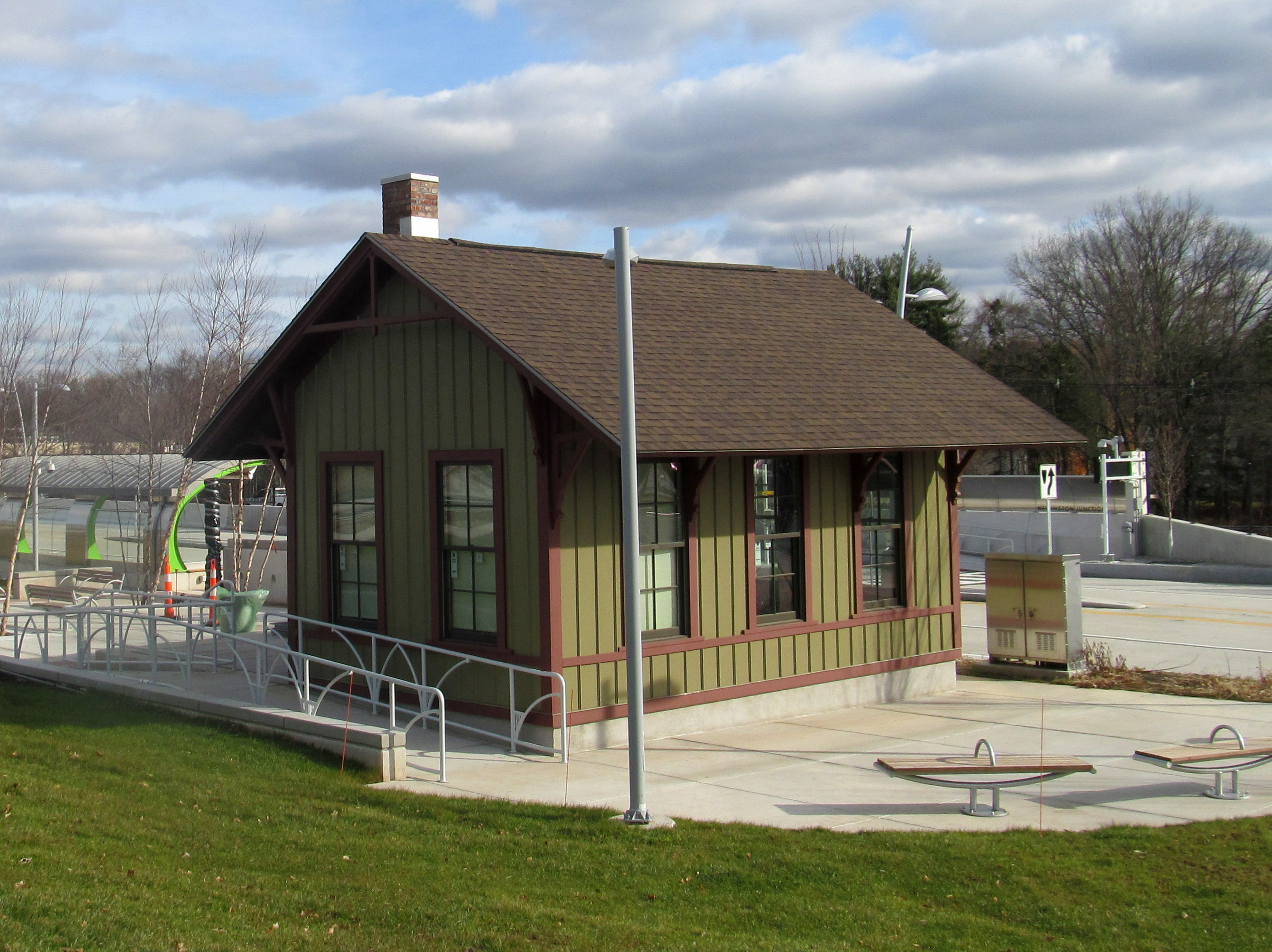
The 1891-built NY&NE station building in 2014, shortly after it was moved and restored during the busway project

The Hartford and New Haven Railroad opened through Newington in 1839, but the railroad did not immediately establish a station there. The Hartford, Providence and Fishkill Railroad opened in 1850; it shared the H&NH right of way north of Newington, but diverged to the south and ran to New Britain. The H&NH then moved its New Britain station, built two years before, to serve as Newington station for both railroads.

For four decades the two railroads shared the station; by 1872, the Boston, Hartford and Erie Railroad (the 1863 successor to the HP&F) paid the H&NH $100 per year to share it. Later in 1872 the H&NH was merged into the New York, New Haven and Hartford Railroad, and the next year the BH&E became part of the New York and New England Railroad. The depot was served for years by a single agent, John C. Sternberg, who sold tickets, handled freight and Adams Express packages, and threw switches to direct trains at the junction. From 1865 it was the site of church services, the beginnings of what in 1875 became nearby Grace Episcopal Church. The development of Newington Junction as a result of the railroad was instrumental in the separation of the town of Newington from its mother town of Wethersfield.

Around 1890, the two railroads decided to build separate stations to serve growing numbers of riders. The NYNH&H built a depot and freight house on the east side of the right of way in 1890; the NY&NE built a nearly identical depot on the west side in 1891. but could not obtain land for a planned freight house. The NY&NE was merged into the NYNH&H in 1898; its depot thenceforth served passengers traveling south towards New Haven and west towards New Britain, while the NYNH&H-built structure served passengers headed north toward Hartford.

Passenger service to New Britain ended in 1959, and Newington closed completely at this time - trains to and from New Haven no longer stopped.

The 1890 NYNH&H station was demolished sometime after the end of service. The remaining buildings were added to the National Register of Historic Places on December 22, 1986, as one of five sections of the Newington Junction Multiple Resources Area. The listing of "Newington Junction Railroad Depot" includes the 1891 NY&NE station, 1890 NYNH&H freight house, and a short section of the Amtrak-owned right of way between them.

As part of the CTfastrak project, the 1891 station building was restored, repainted, and moved slightly to the center of new landscaping in 2014.

=== Bus rapid transit ===
Newington Junction is a bus rapid transit stop on the CTfastrak line, which follows the original HP&F route from Hartford to New Britain. The station consists of two side platforms serving built level with the bus entrances, with two center lanes to allow express buses to bypass the station. It opened with the line on March 28, 2015.

Two Connecticut Transit Hartford routes which do not use the CTfastrak busway, 69 and 140, also stop at the station.

=== Hartford Line ===
In 2004, the Recommended Action of the New Haven Hartford Springfield Commuter Rail Implementation Study included the construction of a new Newington station as part of the New Haven-Hartford-Springfield Commuter Rail Line. A preliminary design in that report included two side platforms serving the line's two tracks, with a 200-space parking lot on the east side. However, Newington and other infill stations were not included in early funding for the line; when the busway station was built nearby, neither commuter rail platforms nor the parking lot were constructed.

The 2012 environmental assessment included preliminary plans for infill stations at North Haven, Newington Junction, West Hartford, and Enfield; although they were not yet funded, this would allow future planning and construction to be expedited. The 2012 plans included a design very similar to the 2004 report. On January 12, 2015, the state announced that $5.75 million in funding would be made available for environmental mitigation and design at ten Hartford Line and New Haven Line stations, including design funding for Hartford Line platforms at Newington Junction. In February 2017, the state announced an additional $50 million in funds, including money to complete design of Newington station. Designs were expected to be completed by 2020. The state aimed to construct all infill stations on the line by 2022, though the city had made no decisions on the new station by that year.

In 2018, the state proposed to build the station further south, at 565 Cedar Street, which is closer to Central Connecticut State University and downtown Newington, due to concerns from neighbors about noise and traffic.

== See also ==
- National Register of Historic Places listings in Hartford County, Connecticut
