= East Main Street station =

Bus rapid transit station in New Britain, Connecticut

East Main Street
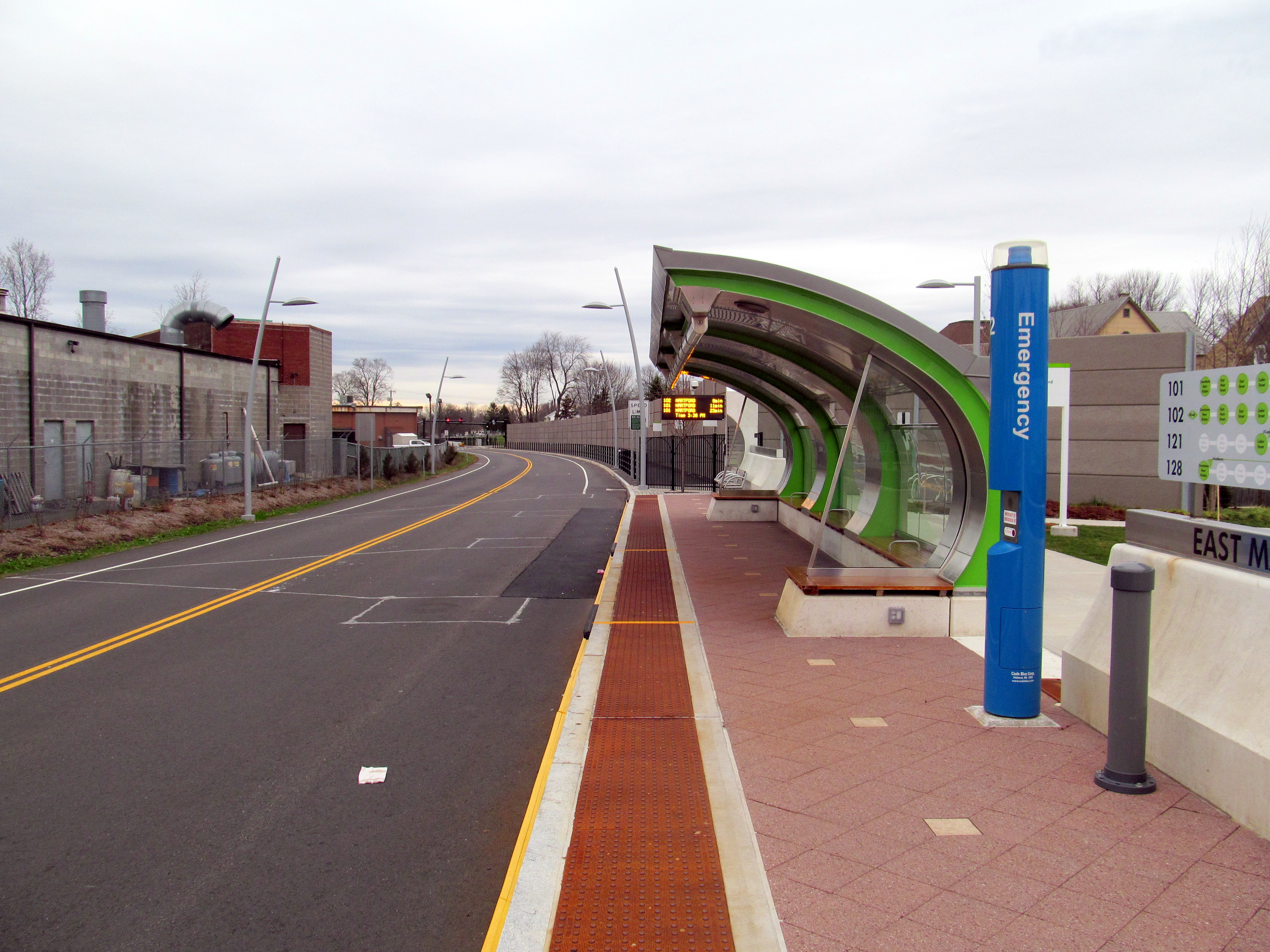
- Northbound platform at East Main Street station in December 2015

General information
- Location: East Main Street and Harvard Street; New Britain, Connecticut
- Coordinates: 41.6720°N 72.7658°W
- Owner: ConnDOT
- Operator: Connecticut Transit
- Bus routes: 101, 102
- Bus stands: 2 side platforms
- Connections: 509 (on East Main Street)

Construction
- Cycle facilities: Yes
- Accessible: Yes

History
- Opened: March 28, 2015

Services
Preceding station	CT Transit	Following station
Downtown New Britain Terminus	CT Fastrak	East Street toward Hartford
Location

East Main Street is a bus rapid transit station on the CTfastrak line, located near the intersection of East Main Street (CT-174) and Wilson Street east of downtown New Britain, Connecticut. It opened with the line on March 28, 2015. The station consists of two side platforms, staggered on opposite corners of the intersection of East Main Street and the busway.
