= Walnut Hill Park =

- U.S. National Register of Historic Places
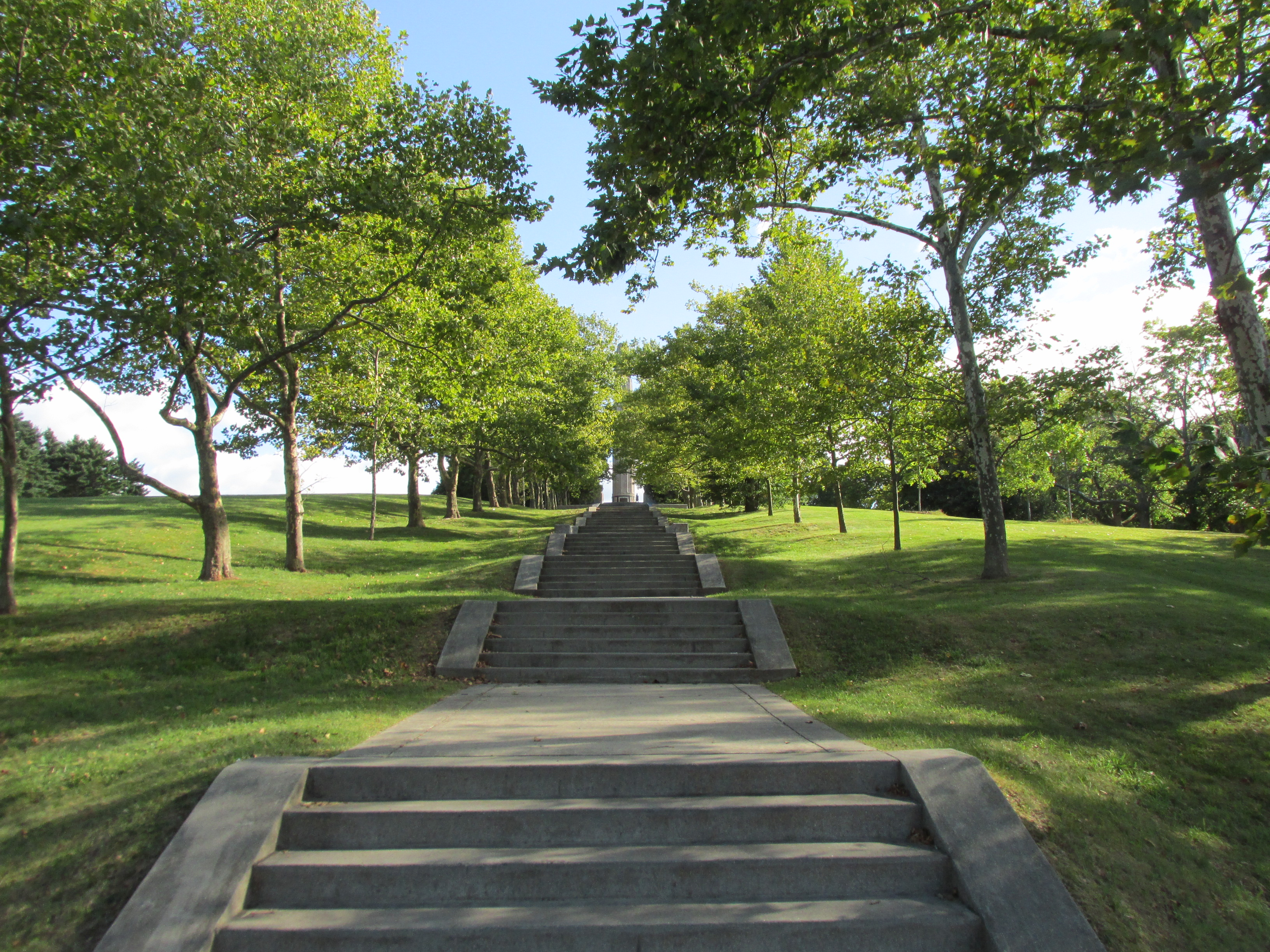

- Location within Connecticut Location within the United States
- Location: West Main Street, New Britain, Connecticut
- Coordinates: 41°39′43″N 72°47′31″W
- Area: 98 acres (40 ha)
- Built: 1870
- Architect: Olmsted, Fredrick Law; Magonigle, H. Van Buren
- Architectural style: Classical Revival, Modern Movement
- NRHP reference No.: 82001000
- Added to NRHP: November 30, 1982

Walnut Hill Park is a large public park west of downtown New Britain, Connecticut. Developed beginning in the 1860s, it is an early work of landscape architect Frederick Law Olmsted, with winding lanes, a band shell, and the city's monument to its World War I soldiers. The park was listed on the National Register of Historic Places in 1982.

== History ==
The area that became Walnut Hill Park was a barren hillside when it was purchased by a group of leading citizens in 1857. In 1858, a reservoir was built on the site to provide additional water for fire protection services. It never adequately fulfilled this role, and was formally decommissioned in 1912 and subsequently filled in. The city hired Frederick Law Olmsted, a native of Hartford who was then in the early years of his partnership with Calvert Vaux, to design the landscaping around the reservoir. The land was formally conveyed to the city in 1867, which in 1870 acquired additional parcels to increase the park size to about 90 acres (36 ha). Cornelius B. Erwin, one of the original proprietors, gave the city an endowment for maintenance of the park. Principal construction of the park roadway took place in 1870-72, and was halted by the financial Panic of 1873. In 1919, the city designated the park as the site of its World War I memorial, an Art Deco structure designed by H. Van Buren Magonigle and installed in 1928. The location was one that Olmsted had designated for the placement of a tower, just to the north of the reservoir.

== Geography ==
The eastern portion of the park is characterized by hilly terrain, with a relatively flat area that was formerly occupied by the reservoir. The reservoir site was eventually reduced to a small wading pool and was later completely filled in and replaced by an oval space with more formal landscaping. The western portion of the park is more level and features a variety of athletic fields, as well as the Darius Miller Band Shell.

== See also ==
- National Register of Historic Places listings in Hartford County, Connecticut
