= New Britain, Connecticut =

City in Connecticut, United States

- City
- City of New Britain
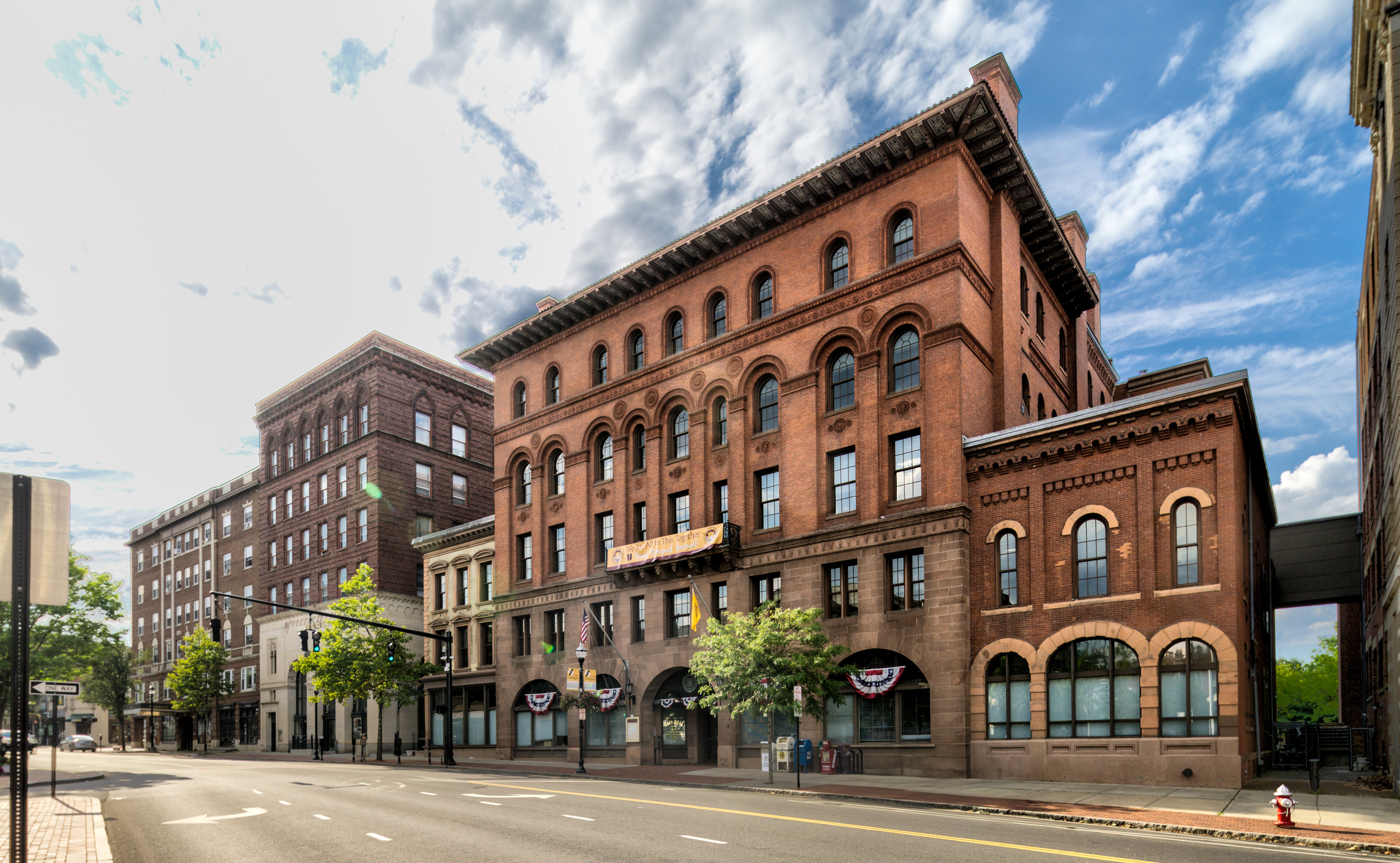
- West Main Street, Downtown New Britain

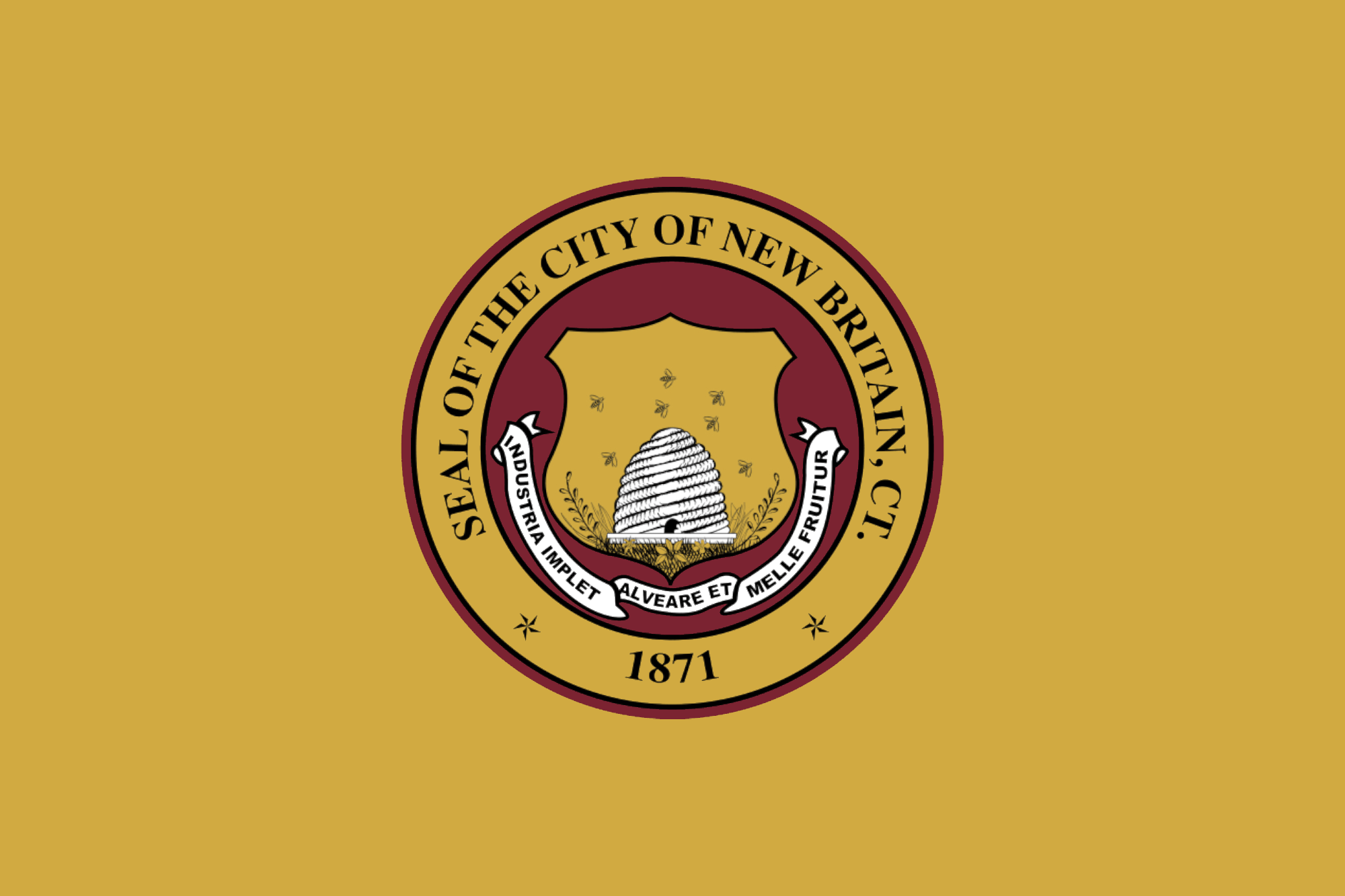
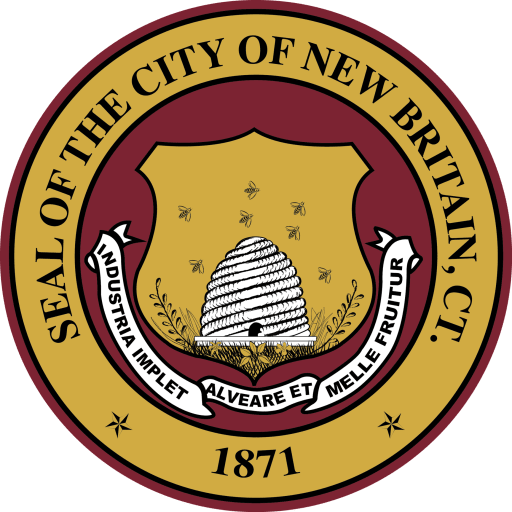
- Flag Seal
- Nicknames: New Britski, Hard-Hittin' New Britain, Hardware City
- Motto: Industria implet alveare et melle fruitur (English: "Industry fills the hive and enjoys the honey.")
- Coordinates: 41°40′30″N 72°47′14″W
- Country: United States
- U.S. state: Connecticut
- County: Hartford
- Region: Capitol Region
- Incorporated (town): 1850
- Incorporated (city): 1871
- Consolidated: 1905

Government
  - Type: Mayor-council
  - Mayor: Bobby Sanchez (D)
  - Common Council: Francisco Santiago; John McNamara; Alberto Borrero; Robert Smedley; Jessica Vargas; Nathan Simpson; Dottie DiLernia; Wilma Barbosa; Yadira Maldonado; Jerrell Hargraves; Candyce Scott; Jason Gibson; Luz Ortiz-Luna; Roy Centeno; Matthew Malinowski

Area
  - Total: 13.43 sq mi (34.78 km^{2})
  - Land: 13.36 sq mi (34.59 km^{2})
  - Water: 0.073 sq mi (0.19 km^{2})
- Elevation: 207 ft (63 m)

Population (2020)
  - Total: 74,135
  - Density: 5,551/sq mi (2,143.2/km^{2})
- Time zone: UTC−5 (EST)
  - Summer (DST): UTC−4 (EDT)
- ZIP Codes: 06050, 06051, 06052, 06053
- Area codes: 860/959
- FIPS code: 09-50370
- GNIS feature ID: 02378284
- Website: newbritainct.gov

New Britain is a city in Hartford County, Connecticut, United States. About 9 miles (14 km) southwest of Hartford, the city is part of the Capitol Planning Region. According to the 2020 Census, the population of the city is 74,135.

Among the southernmost of the communities encompassed within the Hartford-Springfield Knowledge Corridor metropolitan region, New Britain is home to Central Connecticut State University and Charter Oak State College. The city was noted for its industry during the 19th and early 20th centuries, and sites listed on the National Register of Historic Places include Walnut Hill Park, developed by the landscape architect Frederick Law Olmsted and Downtown New Britain.

The city's official nickname is the "Hardware City" because of its history as a manufacturing center and as the headquarters of Stanley Black & Decker. Because of its large Polish population, the city is often playfully referred to as "New Britski".

== History ==
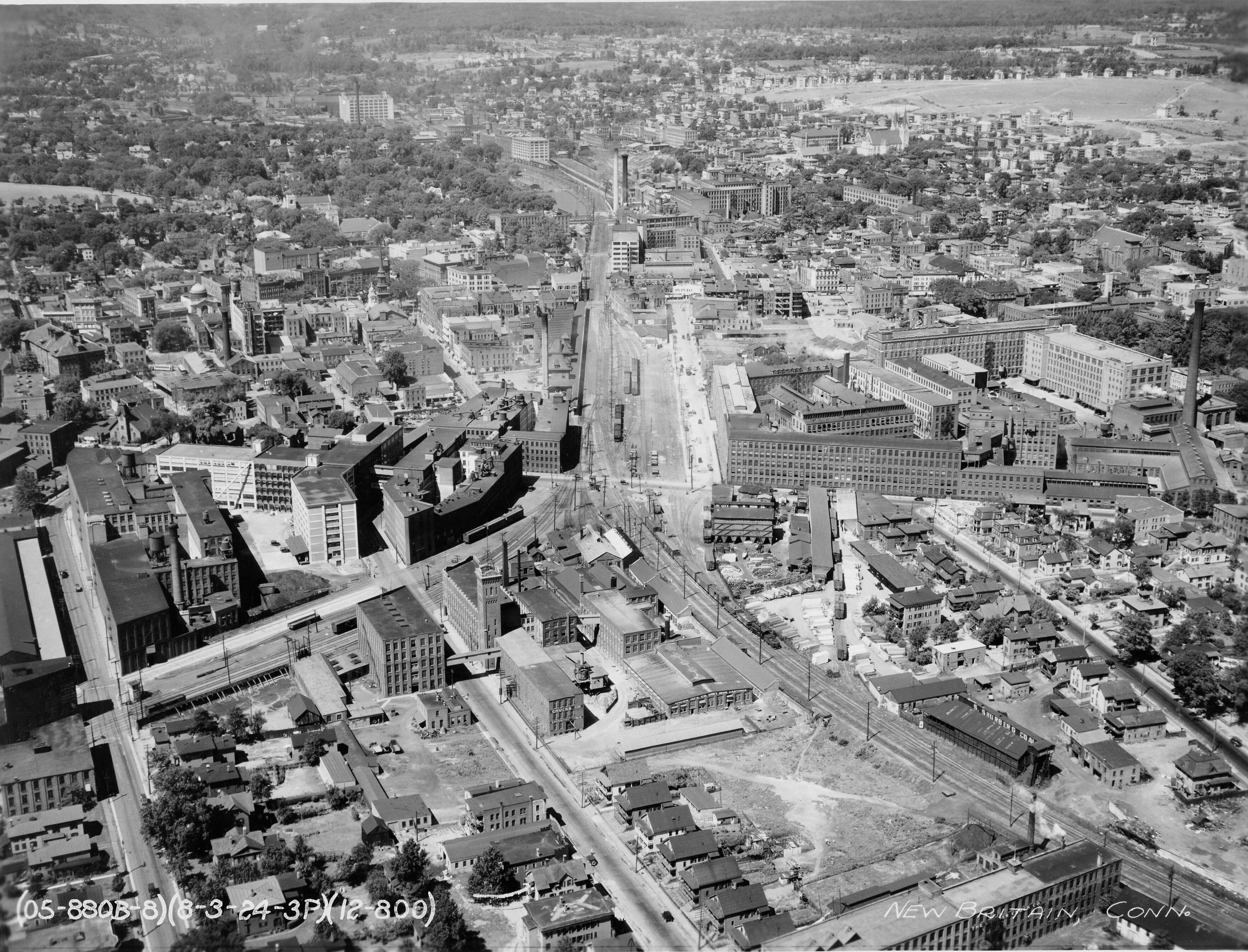
View of New Britain, 1930. Essentially nothing is left of the industrial buildings today.

=== 17th-18th century ===
New Britain was settled in 1687. It was incorporated as a new parish as the New Britain Society in 1754.

=== 19th century ===
Chartered in 1850 as a township and in 1871 as a city, New Britain had separated from the nearby towns of Farmington and Berlin, Connecticut. A consolidation charter was adopted in 1905. New Britain Normal School trained teachers. It relocated in 1922 to its current location on Stanley Street. It became Teachers College of Connecticut in 1933. It was renamed again in 1959 as Central Connecticut State College and in 1983 became Central Connecticut State University.

Major manufacturers, such as The Stanley Works, the P&F Corbin Company (founded 1848, later Corbin Locks), Landers, Frary & Clark (LF&C) founded 1842, Union Manufacturing Company, founded in 1866 and North & Judd, were headquartered in the city. During the early part of the 20th century, New Britain was known as the "Hardware Capital of the World", as well as "Hardware City".

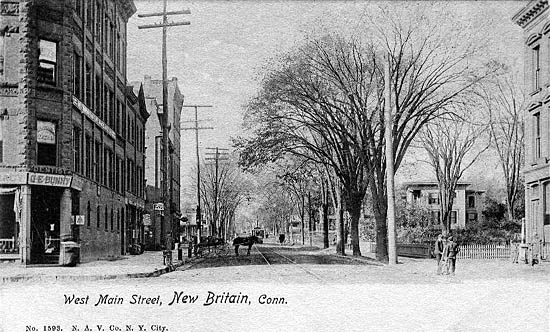
Postcard: West Main Street, pre-1907

In 1843 Frederick Trent Stanley established Stanley's Bolt Manufactory in New Britain to make door bolts and other wrought-iron hardware. In 1857 his cousin Henry Stanley founded The Stanley Rule and Level Company in the city. Planes invented by Leonard Bailey and manufactured by the Stanley Rule and Level Company, known as "Stanley/Bailey" planes, were prized by woodworkers of the late 19th and early 20th centuries and remain popular among wood craftsmen today. The two companies merged in 1920, and the Stanley Rule and Level Company became the Hand Tools Division of Stanley Works.

The wire coat hanger was invented in 1869 by O. A. North of New Britain. In 1895, the basketball technique of dribbling was developed at the New Britain YMCA.

=== 20th century ===
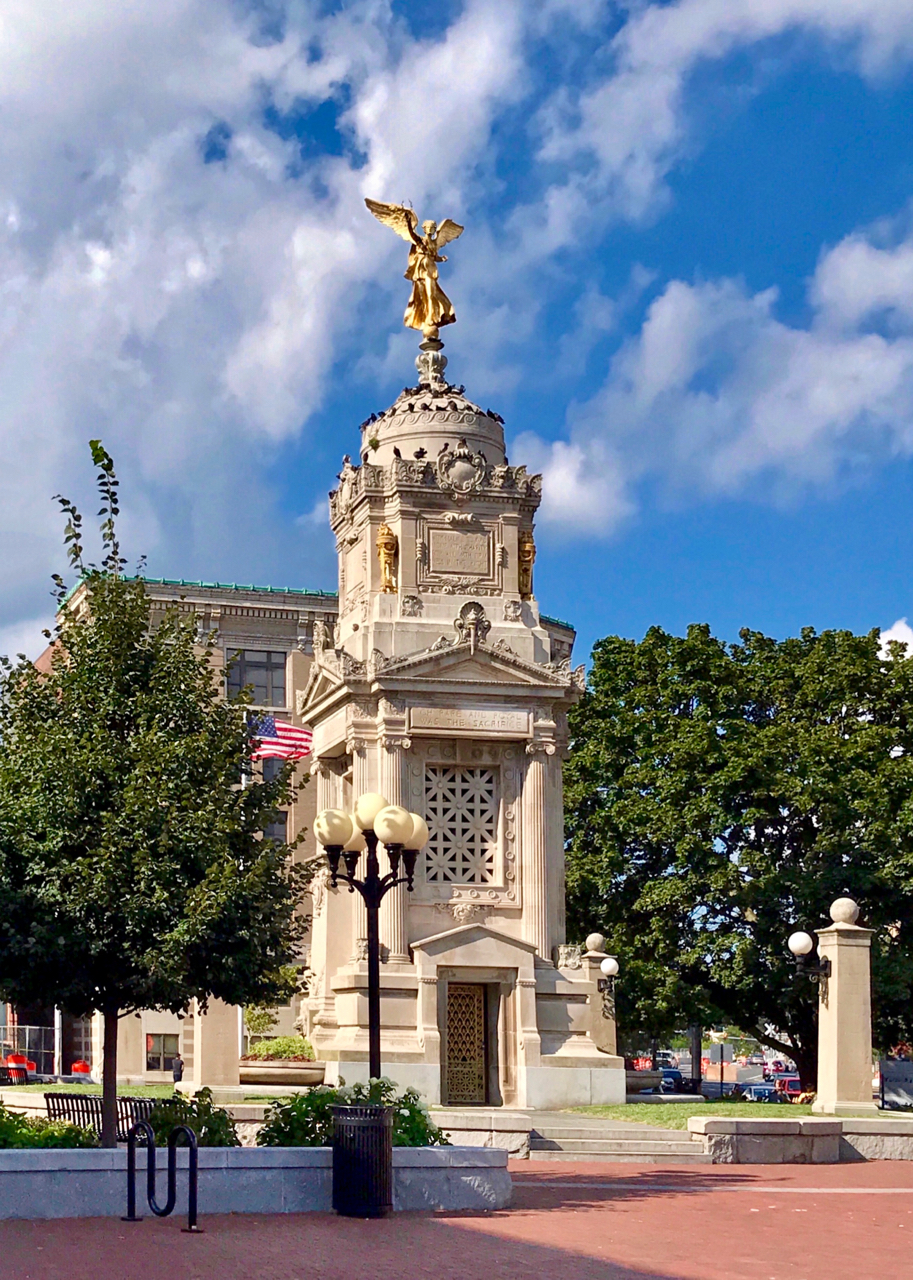
The Civil War Monument in 2018

In 1900, a monument to veterans of the American Civil War was dedicated.

In 1938, New Britain High School competed in the high school football national championship game in Baton Rouge, Louisiana. The year 1954 saw the development of racquetball, also at the YMCA.

The heads of the fire and police departments and seven other municipal employees were arrested as part of a corruption scandal in the 1970s.

Union Manufacturing produced stainless steel thermos flasks, amongst other things, registering the trademark for Uno-Vac in 1967; it closed its factory doors in 1986.

In 2024, Governor Ned Lamont proclaimed New Britain the "Hot Dog Capital of Connecticut," owing to the city's numerous prominent hot dog-related businesses.

== City motto ==
New Britain's motto, Industria implet alveare et melle fruitur—translated from Latin—means "Industry fills the hive and enjoys the honey." This phrase was coined by Elihu Burritt, a 19th-century New Britain resident, diplomat, philanthropist and social activist.

In 2007 it was reported that the Latin word for "honey" in the motto had been a typo for decades; it should be melle, but it had long been misspelled as mele. Former mayor William McNamara, who unsuccessfully tried to fix it during his term, suggested "to either fix the spelling immediately" or "switch to the English version of the motto." As controversy arose from the matter, the word was superseded with the correct spelling, melle.

== Geography and topography ==
According to the United States Census Bureau, the city has a total area of 13.4 square miles (34.7 km^{2}), of which 13.3 square miles (34.6 km^{2}) is land and 0.1 square mile (0.2 km^{2}) (0.52%) is water.

New Britain's terrain is mostly made up of gentle, rolling hills and young Connecticut forest. The many parks are populated with trees, and in small, undeveloped areas, there are also brushy woods. New Britain's streets also have many trees lining the sides of the roads. Many front yards in the northern half of the city have at least one tree. One or two streams flow through New Britain, undisturbed by the development.

== Demographics ==
=== Racial and ethnic composition ===
New Britain city, Connecticut – racial and ethnic composition Note: the US Census treats Hispanic/Latino as an ethnic category. This table excludes Latinos from the racial categories and assigns them to a separate category. Hispanics/Latinos may be of any race.
Race / Ethnicity (NH = Non-Hispanic)	2020	2010	2000	1990	1980
White alone (NH)	37.1% (27,535)	47.7% (34,919)	58.8% (42,083)	74.7% (56,405)	84.9% (62,686)
Black alone (NH)	12.5% (9,294)	10.9% (7,982)	9.7% (6,965)	7% (5,257)	5.5% (4,034)
American Indian alone (NH)	0.1% (74)	0.1% (99)	0.1% (106)	0.2% (118)	0.1% (105)
Asian alone (NH)	2.5% (1,884)	2.3% (1,672)	2.3% (1,636)	1.7% (1,294)	0.3% (198)
Pacific Islander alone (NH)	0% (27)	0% (16)	0% (17)		
Other race alone (NH)	0.6% (478)	0.2% (166)	0.2% (122)	0.2% (133)	0.2% (152)
Multiracial (NH)	3% (2,223)	1.9% (1,418)	2.1% (1,471)	—	—
Hispanic/Latino (any race)	44% (32,620)	36.8% (26,934)	26.8% (19,138)	16.3% (12,284)	9% (6,665)

=== Ancestry ===
Largest ancestries (2010)	Percent
Puerto-Rican	29.9%
Polish	17.1%
Italian	9.6%
Irish	8%
German	4.1%
English	3.9%
French-Canadian	3.8%
Haitian	3.1%

Historical population
Census	Pop.	Note	%±
1880	11,800		—
1890	16,519		40.0%
1900	25,998		57.4%
1910	43,916		68.9%
1920	59,316		35.1%
1930	68,128		14.9%
1940	68,685		0.8%
1950	73,726		7.3%
1960	82,201		11.5%
1970	83,441		1.5%
1980	73,840		−11.5%
1990	75,491		2.2%
2000	71,538		−5.2%
2010	73,206		2.3%
2020	74,135		1.3%
U.S. Decennial Census

=== 2020 census ===
As of the 2020 census, New Britain had a population of 74,135. The median age was 34.6 years. 22.3% of residents were under the age of 18 and 13.9% of residents were 65 years of age or older. For every 100 females there were 93.7 males, and for every 100 females age 18 and over there were 90.9 males age 18 and over.

99.9% of residents lived in urban areas, while 0.1% lived in rural areas.

There were 29,054 households in New Britain, of which 30.0% had children under the age of 18 living in them. Of all households, 29.3% were married-couple households, 24.1% were households with a male householder and no spouse or partner present, and 36.6% were households with a female householder and no spouse or partner present. About 32.7% of all households were made up of individuals and 12.0% had someone living alone who was 65 years of age or older.

There were 31,510 housing units, of which 7.8% were vacant. The homeowner vacancy rate was 1.8% and the rental vacancy rate was 6.0%.

Racial composition as of the 2020 census
Race	Number	Percent
White	34,116	46.0%
Black or African American	11,004	14.8%
American Indian and Alaska Native	399	0.5%
Asian	1,954	2.6%
Native Hawaiian and Other Pacific Islander	47	0.1%
Some other race	15,545	21.0%
Two or more races	11,070	14.9%
Hispanic or Latino (of any race)	32,620	44.0%

=== 2010 census ===
There were 28,261 households, out of which 33.8% had children under the age of 18 living with them, 29.4% were married couples living together, 25.6% had a female householder with no husband present, and 40.7% were non-families. 33.0% of all households were made up of individuals, and 13.6% had someone living alone who was 65 years of age or older. The average household size was 2.50 and the average family size was 3.23.

In the city, the population was spread out, with 23.6% under the age of 18, 10.6% from 18 to 24, 29.8% from 25 to 44, 21.8% from 45 to 64, and 14.2% who were 65 years of age or older. The median age was 34 years. For every 100 females, there were 88 males.

=== Income and poverty ===
In 2021, the median income for a household in the city was $51,586, and for a family, was $67,482. The per capita income for the city was $26,152. 19.9% of the population was below the poverty line. The poverty rate was 15.4% for White Non-Hispanic residents, and 25.7% for Hispanic or Latino residents.

=== Polish community ===
New Britain has the largest Polish population of any city in Connecticut, and by 1930 a quarter of the city was ethnically Polish. Also referred to as "Little Poland", the city's Broad Street neighborhood has been home to a considerable number of Polish businesses and families since 1890. On September 23, 2008, through the urging of the Polonia Business Association, the New Britain City Council unanimously passed a resolution officially designating New Britain's Broad Street area as "Little Poland". In recent years, the Polish community has been credited with revitalizing the area both culturally and economically. Media is served by three Polish language newspapers and a television station, and many businesses and civil agencies are bilingual. The post office branch in Little Poland is the only one in the nation with the word "post" written in Polish to welcome visitors. Each year, a Little Poland festival is held on a Sunday in the spring.

Notable visitors to the Polish district have included Presidents Richard Nixon and Ronald Reagan on July 8, 1987. In 1969, as then-Cardinal Karol Wojtyła, the future Pope John Paul II gave a mass at Sacred Heart Church. A statue was erected in his honor in 2007. Dubbed the city's "Polish heart" by The Boston Globe, Little Poland caught the attention of Polish Ambassador to the US Ryszard Schnepf, who toured the area with US Senators Chris Murphy and Richard Blumenthal, US Congresswoman Elizabeth Esty, as well as several members of the Polish Sejm. An honorary Polish consulate was established in March 2017. The first of its kind in Connecticut, it was established by Polish diplomat to the United States Piotr Wilczek.

In September 2019, Polish President Andrzej Duda became the first head of state to visit New Britain when he addressed thousands in Walnut Hill Park prior to traveling to New York City for the United Nations General Assembly. Duda was joined by a variety of Connecticut politicians, including Governor Ned Lamont, U.S. Representative Jahana Hayes and Senators Chris Murphy and Richard Blumenthal.

== Government and politics ==
Voter registration and party enrollment as of October 31, 2023
Party	Active voters	Inactive voters	Total voters	Percentage
Unaffiliated	12,849	4,668	17,517	44.59%
Democratic	13,349	3,249	16,598	42.25%
Republican	3,986	651	4,637	11.80%
Other Parties	407	122	529	1.35%
Total	30,591	8,690	39,281	100%

New Britain city vote by party in presidential elections
Year	Democratic	Republican	Third parties
2024	60.8% 13,483	37.4% 8.282	2.71% 560
2020	66.06% 16,031	32.09% 7,724	1.31% 315
2016	69.28% 15,468	27.12% 6,055	3.61% 805
2012	76.32% 16,052	22.74% 4,783	0.94% 197
2008	74.54% 16,742	24.23% 5,442	1.23% 276
2004	67.01% 14,122	31.13% 6,560	1.86% 392
2000	69.48% 13,913	25.26% 5,059	5.26% 1,054
1996	66.44% 14,322	22.78% 4,911	10.77% 2,322
1992	53.80% 14,159	26.75% 7,040	19.45% 5,118
1988	61.63% 15,843	37.22% 9,569	1.15% 295
1984	51.24% 14,608	48.14% 13,723	0.62% 177
1980	53.21% 15,649	34.99% 10,292	11.80% 3,470
1976	60.32% 18,737	38.96% 12,101	0.72% 223
1972	52.31% 18,143	46.52% 16,134	1.17% 405
1968	65.71% 21,890	28.97% 9,651	5.32% 1,772
1964	80.47% 29,976	19.53% 7,273	0.00% 0
1960	68.84% 27,293	31.16% 12,352	0.00% 0
1956	46.86% 18,125	53.14% 20,551	0.00% 0

== Accent ==
Natives of New Britain have a fairly unmarked Connecticut accent, though there is some local perception of a distinct accent, popularly attributed to the Polish-American community, such as the use of a glottal stop in place of /t/ before syllabic /l/: in other words, in words like cattle and bottle. The short "a" vowel /æ/ as in TRAP may be raised to [ɛə] for some speakers in Connecticut, including New Britain, though this feature appears to be declining among younger residents.

== Economy ==
New Britain is home to the global headquarters of the Fortune 500 manufacturing conglomerate Stanley Black & Decker. Other companies headquartered in New Britain include Gaffney, Bennett and Associates, Tomasso Group, Creed Monarch, Guida's Dairy, and Polamer Precision.

=== Top employers ===
According to the City's 2024 Annual Comprehensive Financial Report, the top employers in the city are:

#	Employer	# of employees
1	Central Connecticut State University	2,879
2	Hospital of Central Connecticut	2,522
3	City of New Britain	1,910
4	Hospital for Special Care	1,300
5	Stanley Black & Decker	600
6	Starling Physicians	326
7	Community Mental Health Affiliates (CMHA)	325
8	Creed Monarch	275
9	Rich Products	268
10	Guida's Dairy	257

== Sites of interest ==
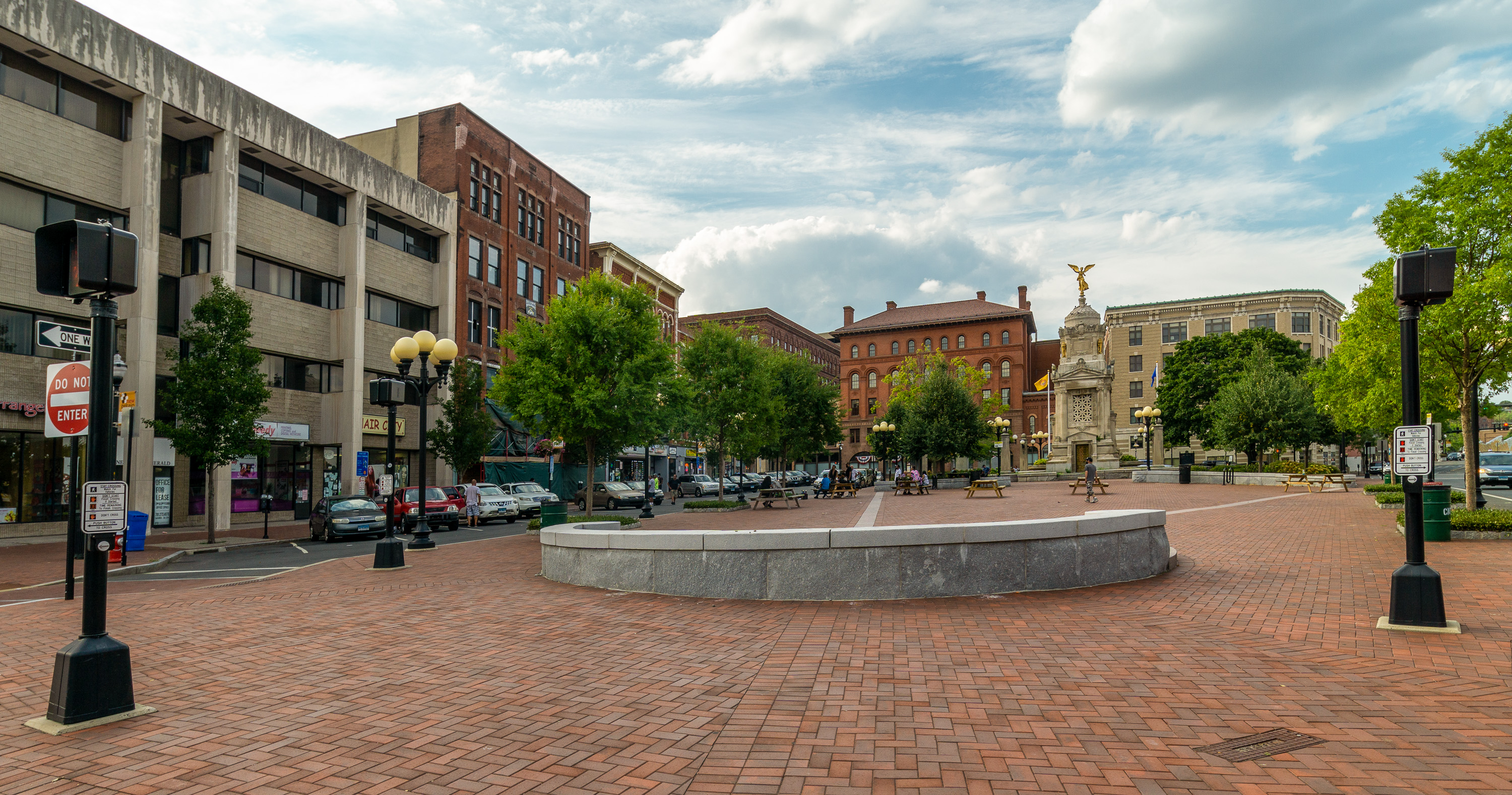
Downtown New Britain

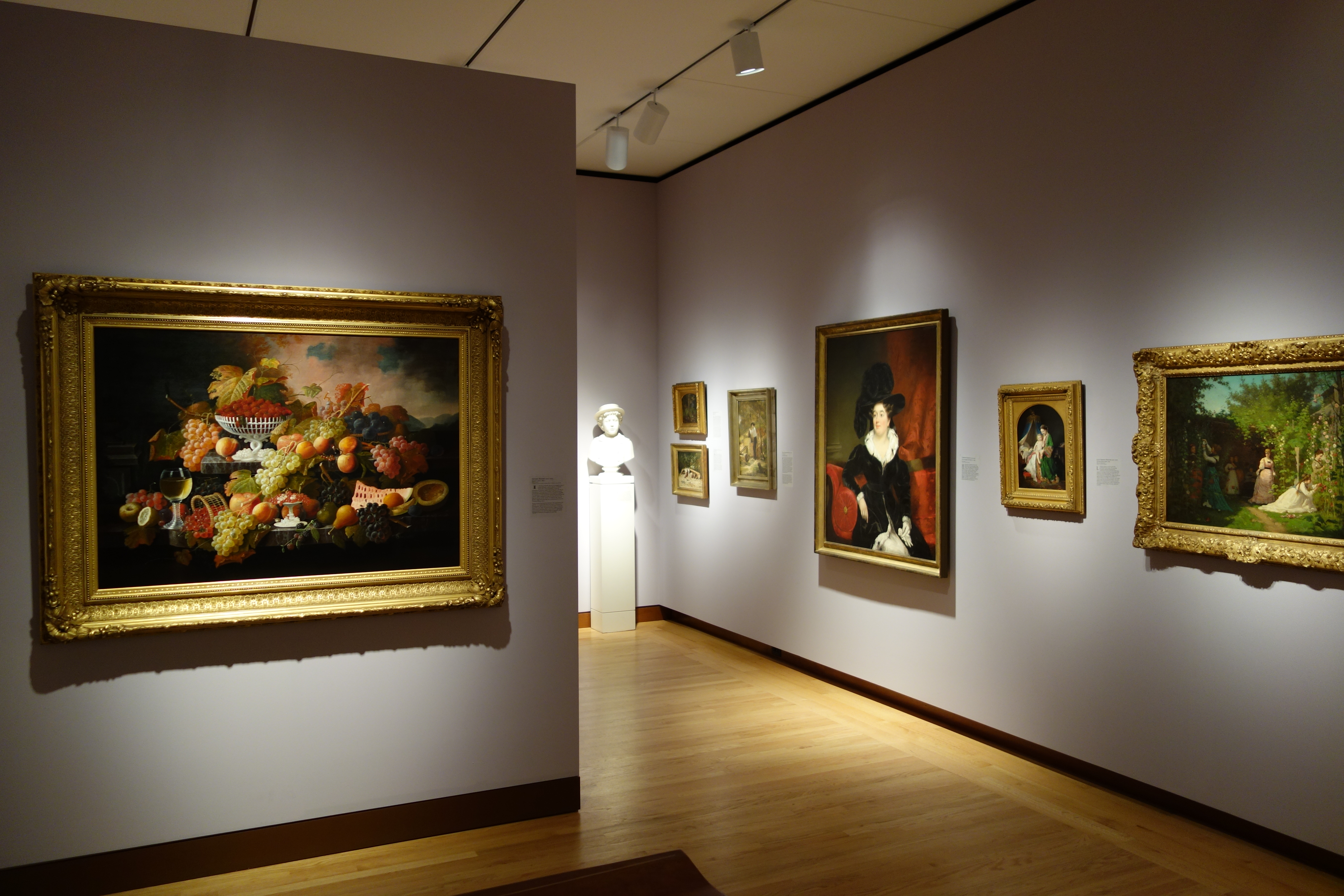
New Britain Museum of American Art

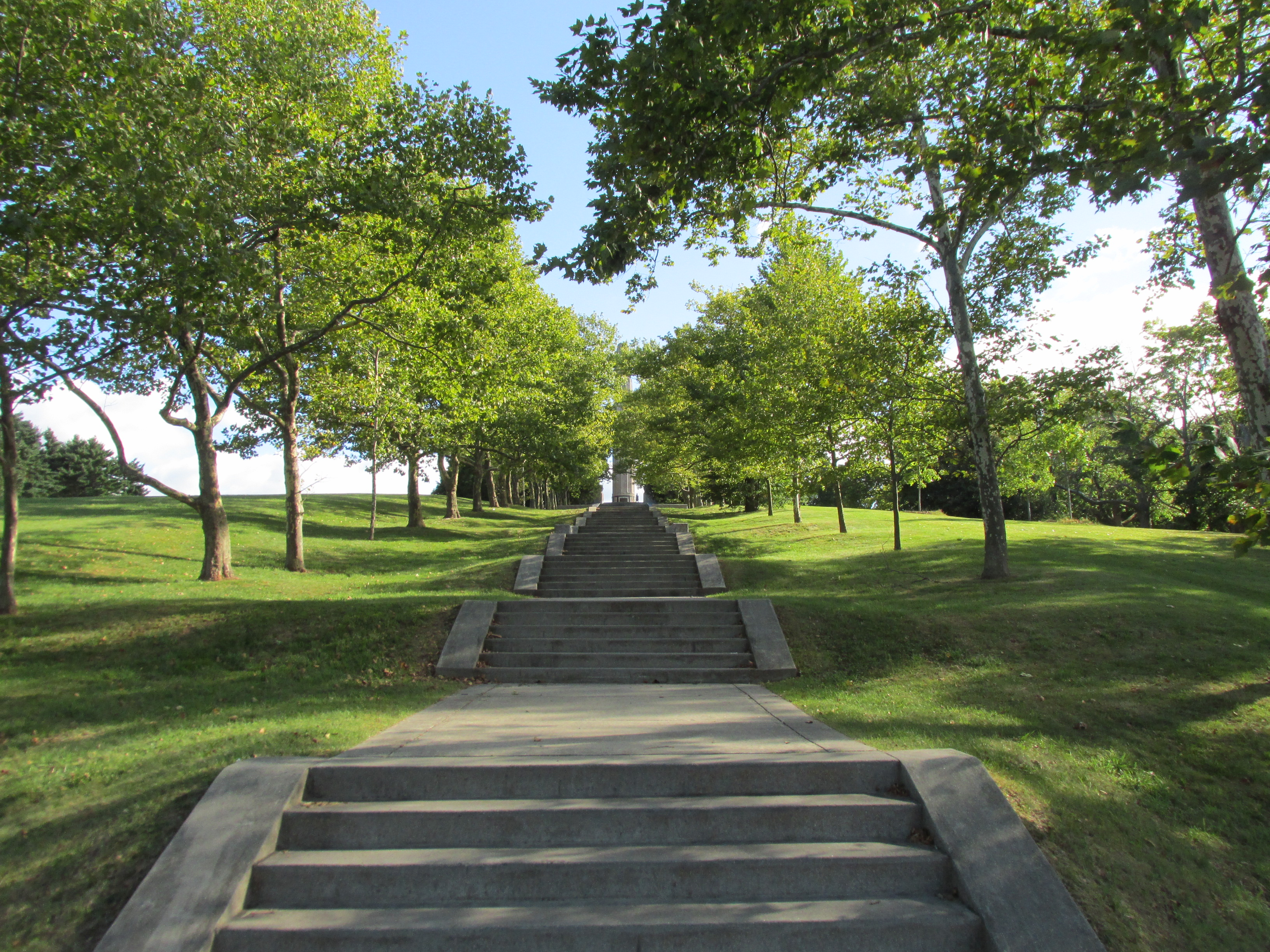
Walnut Hill Park

- New Britain Museum of American Art, the oldest art museum in the United States devoted to American art
- New Britain Industrial Museum
- Walnut Hill Park, designed by Frederick Law Olmsted, who also designed Central Park in New York City
- Walnut Hill Rose Garden with over 800 roses
- Connecticut Theatre Company, located in the historic Repertory Theatre of New Britain
- Hole in the Wall Theater
- New Britain Youth Museum, contains children's artifacts and exhibits on regional culture
- The Polish district or "Little Poland": Located in the vicinity of Broad Street.

== Sports ==
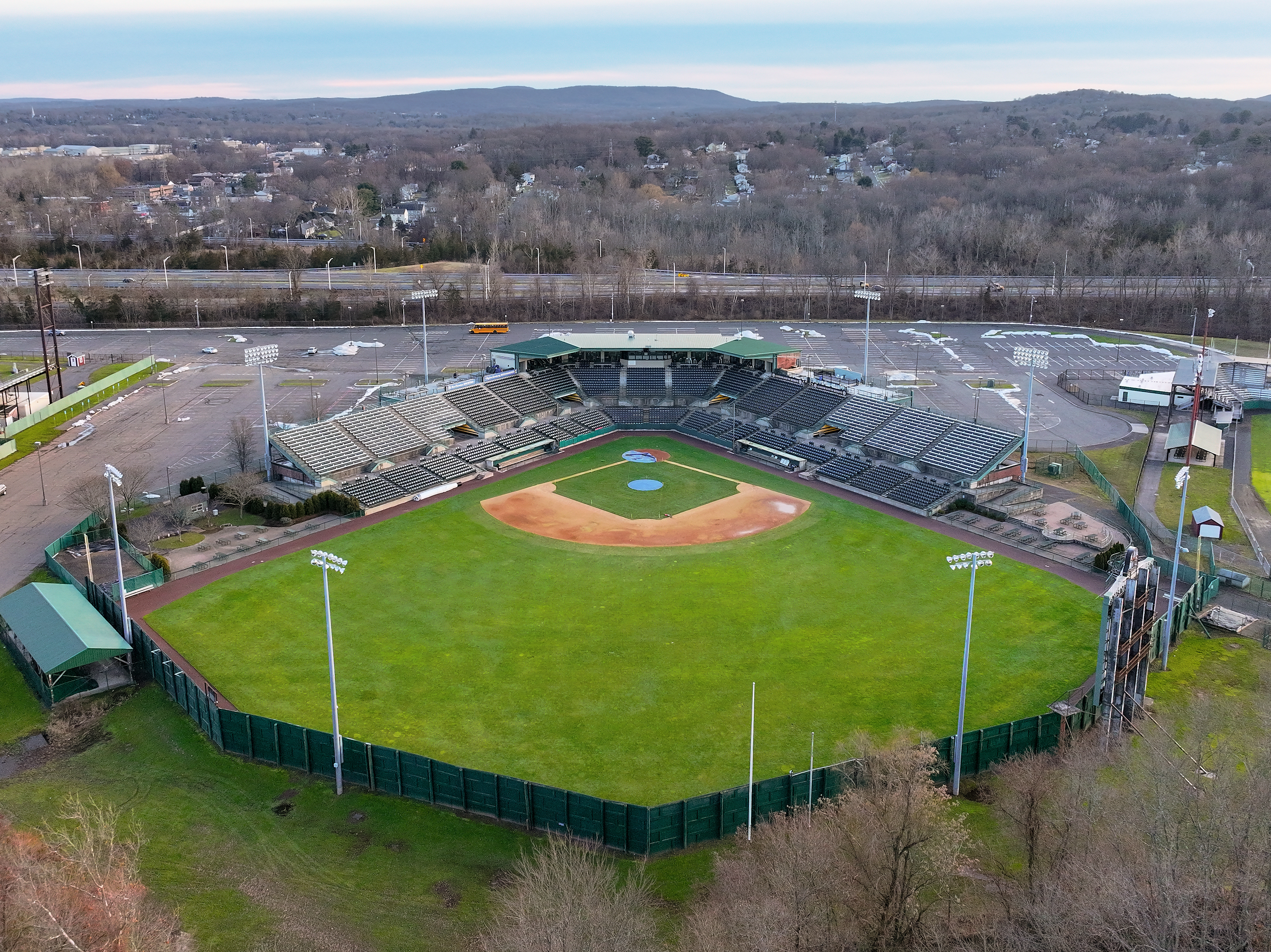
New Britain Stadium

- New Britain Bees, a collegiate summer baseball team that plays in New Britain Stadium
- Hartford City FC, professional soccer team playing at CCSU soccer field
- New Britain Fagan Cal Ripken Baseball League, a youth baseball program that serves children from the City of New Britain between the ages of 4 and 12
- New Britain Little League (NBLL, previously known as Walicki – A.W. Stanley Little League), a youth baseball and softball organization that serves the children of New Britain between the ages of 4 and 16
- Connecticut United Football Club, a professional soccer team affiliated with the American Soccer League

== Education ==
=== Colleges and universities ===
The city is home to Central Connecticut State University and Charter Oak State College, a public liberal arts college.

==== Primary and secondary schools ====
The Consolidated School District of New Britain operates public schools. The local high school is New Britain High School. New Britain was also home to the Mountain Laurel Sudbury School but has since closed in 2019.

The Roman Catholic Archdiocese of Hartford is responsible for the operation of Catholic schools. A Catholic elementary school, Sacred Heart School, is in New Britain. St. Thomas Aquinas High School closed in 1999.

The Holy Cross Catholic School was established in 1954. The Holy Cross, St. Francis of Assisi and St. Joseph Catholic schools merged into Saint John Paul II School in 2006; the Holy Cross parish sponsored the consolidated school. The archdiocese closed the SJP School in 2015. At the time of its closing, SJP school had debts of over $300,000.

== Transportation ==
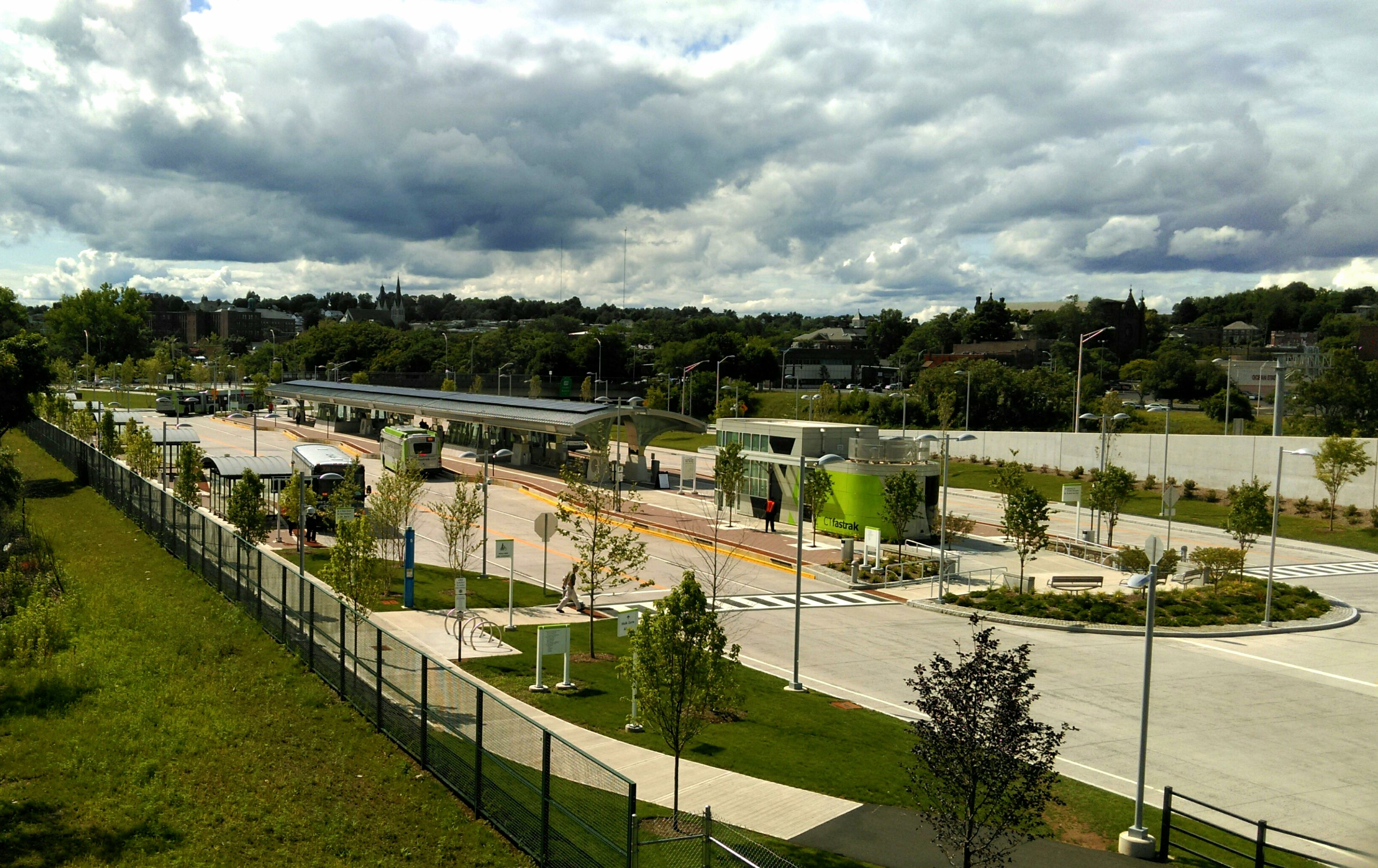
Downtown New Britain station is the terminus of CT Fastrak.

Route 9 is the city's main expressway connecting traffic between Hartford (via I-84 and I-91) and Middletown and Old Saybrook. I-84 itself clips the northwestern corner of the city. Public transportation is provided by Connecticut Transit.

Downtown New Britain serves as the southern terminus of CTfastrak, a bus rapid transit line. Operated by Connecticut Transit, the project officially broke ground in May 2012, and became operational in March 2015. The route's northern terminus is Union Station in Hartford. There are also CTfastrak stations on East Main Street and East Street, the latter near Central Connecticut State University. New Britain is served by Connecticut Transit New Britain.

New Britain has a nearby Amtrak station in adjacent Berlin. The Vermonter (once daily) and Amtrak Hartford Line (multiple daily arrivals/departures) provide service to destinations throughout the northeastern United States. There is also a Berlin stop on the CT Rail Hartford Line, which provides northbound service to Hartford and Springfield, and southbound service towards New Haven.

Bradley International Airport (BDL) in Windsor Locks and Tweed New Haven Airport (HVN) in East Haven are the closest commercial airports to New Britain.

== Notable people ==
- Paul S. Amenta (1922–2014), state senator
- Anita Antoinette (born 1989), reggae singer and songwriter
- Charles Avedisian (1917–1983), NB athletic director (1952–1966), member of 1944 New York Football Giants team ranked as #1 defensive unit in NFL history
- Robert S. Barton (1925–2009), computer designer and system architect, inventor of stack architecture
- Christopher A. Bray, member of the Vermont House of Representatives and Vermont Senate
- Elihu Burritt (1810–1879), diplomat, philanthropist, social activist, appointed by Abraham Lincoln as U.S. consul in Birmingham, England
- Harold V. Camp (1935–2022), lawyer, politician, and businessman
- Walter Camp (1859–1925), Yale football player and coach, the "father of American football"
- Margaret Miller Cooper (1872–1965), artist
- Phillip Corbin (1824–1910), founder of P&F Corbin Co., a major manufacturer of locks and keys
- Steve Dalkowski (1939–2020), former pitcher in the minor leagues famous for his high speed fastball
- Daym Drops (born 1977), YouTube food reviewer
- Anna Eshoo (born 1942), U.S. representative of California's 18th congressional district
- Lena Santos Ferguson (1928–2004), second African-American member of the Daughters of the American Revolution
- Vincent Fort (1956–2024), member of the Georgia State Senate for the 39th district
- Willie Hall (born 1949), linebacker for the Super Bowl XI champion Oakland Raiders; Pulaski High School, University of Southern California
- Charles K. Hamilton (1881–1914), aviator
- Harry Jacunski (1915–2003), professional football player with Green Bay Packers, member of Fordham University Seven Blocks of Granite, Yale football coach for 33 years
- Nancy Johnson (born 1935), U.S. representative for 5th and 6th CT districts (1983–2007)
- Byron Jones (born 1992), NFL player, former free safety for the Dallas Cowboys and unofficial world record holder of the standing long jump
- Tebucky Jones (born 1974), professional football player
- James Kilbourne (1770–1850), founder of Worthington, Ohio
- David LaFlamme (1941–2023), virtuoso violinist in both classical and rock music
- Tony Leone (born 1969), rock and jazz drummer
- Sol LeWitt (1928–2007), conceptual artist
- Bruce H. Mahan (1930–1982), professor of chemistry at UC-Berkeley, thesis advisor of Nobel Laureate Y.T. Lee
- Paul Manafort (born 1949), lobbyist, advisor to political campaigns of Ronald Reagan, George H. W. Bush, Robert Dole, George W. Bush, John McCain and Donald Trump
- Thomas J. Meskill (1928–2007), New Britain mayor (1962–1964), governor (1971–1975), appointed by Richard Nixon to the US Court of Appeals for 2nd Circuit (1975–2007)
- Chris Murphy (born 1973), U.S. congressman for 5th CT district (2007–2013) and U.S. senator for Connecticut (2013–present)
- Lamar Odom (born 1979), St. Thomas Aquinas basketball great, NBA player with the Los Angeles Clippers, Miami Heat, Los Angeles Lakers and Dallas Mavericks
- Jon Olsen (born 1969), swimmer, winner of four Olympic gold medals
- Charles Patterson (born 1935), author and historian
- Carl Pavano (born 1976), professional baseball player
- Joe Porcaro (1930–2020), drummer in Los Angeles and father of the Porcaro brothers who founded the band Toto
- Charles J. Prestia (1909–1953), Secretary of the State of Connecticut 1945–1947
- Frank W. Putnam (1917–2006), biochemist, born in New Britain
- Charles Quigley (1906–1964), actor
- Adolfas Ramanauskas (1918–1957), one of the prominent leaders of the Lithuanian partisans
- Abraham A. Ribicoff (1910–1998), congressman (1949–1953), governor (1955–1961), Secretary of Health, Education and Welfare (1961–1962), U.S. senator from Connecticut (1963–1981)
- Velvet Sky (born 1981), ring name of professional wrestler Jamie Szantyr with Total Nonstop Action Wrestling
- George Springer (born 1989), professional baseball player currently with the Toronto Blue Jays
- Frederick Trent Stanley (1802–1883), first mayor of NB (1870), founder of Stanley Bolt Manufacturing (1843), which became The Stanley Works (1857) and (2010) Stanley Black & Decker
- Erin Stewart (born 1987), mayor of New Britain (2013–2025)
- Tom Thibodeau (born 1958), former head coach of the New York Knicks of the NBA

== Sister cities ==
New Britain's sister cities are:

- Atsugi, Japan
- Giannitsa, Greece
- Pułtusk, Poland
- Rastatt, Germany
- Solarino, Italy
