= CT Fastrak =

Bus rapid transit operations in Connecticut, US

CTfastrak

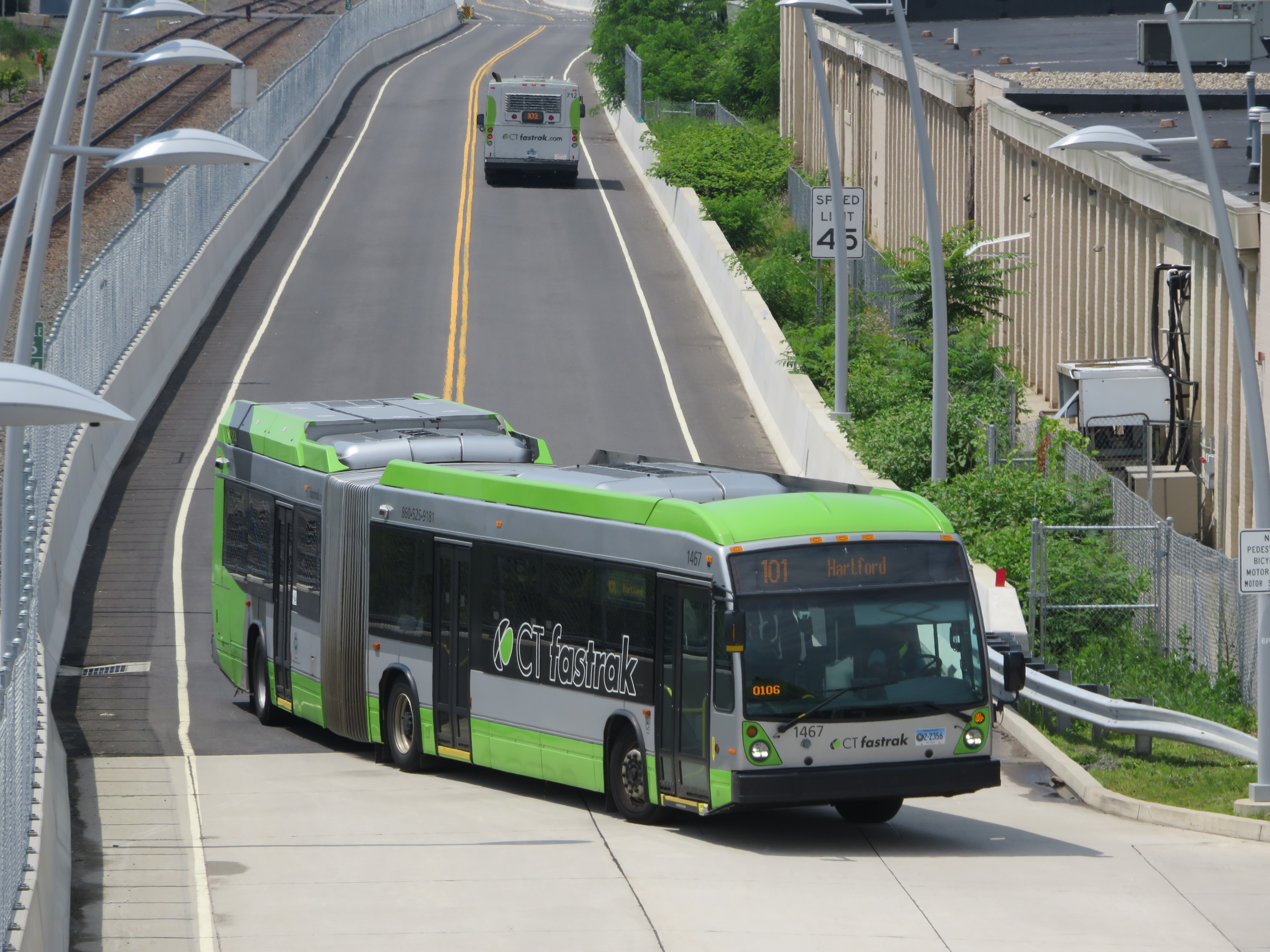
- CTfastrak buses at Flatbush Avenue station
- Locale: Central Connecticut
- Service type: Bus rapid transit
- Routes: 8 local routes 4 express routes
- Stations: 10
- Daily ridership: 14,277 (August 2023)
- Fuel type: Hybrid diesel-electric (Battery Electric in 2027)
- Operator: Connecticut Transit
- Program Director: Michael Sanders
- Website: cttransit.com/services/ctfastrak

CT Fastrak (stylized as CTfastrak and constructed as the New Britain-Hartford Busway) is a regional bus rapid transit system currently operating between downtown Hartford and Downtown New Britain station in New Britain in central Connecticut. Operated by Connecticut Transit, it is the first bus rapid transit system in Connecticut and the second in New England after the MBTA Silver Line. CTfastrak opened on March 28, 2015 after fifteen years of planning and three years of construction.

CTfastrak services run on a 9.4-mile (15.1 km) dedicated busway which runs on an abandoned railroad right-of-way from Downtown New Britain to Newington Junction and alongside the active New Haven–Springfield Line from Newington Junction to downtown Hartford. Eight local and four express routes operate along the busway and over on-street loops in downtown Hartford.

CTfastrak is rated Silver according to the BRT Standard, along with the Van Ness Bus Rapid Transit and HealthLine.

== Infrastructure ==
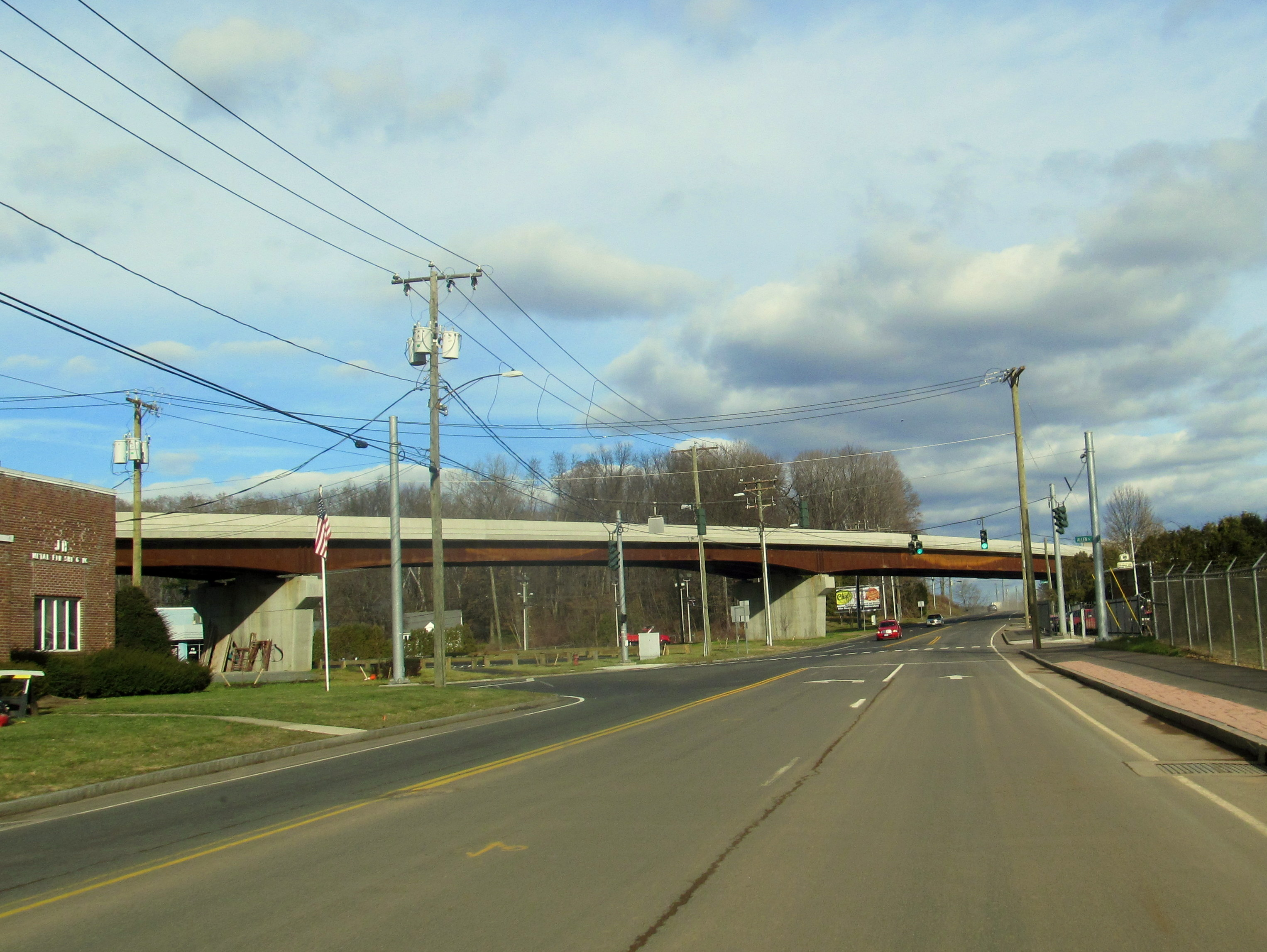
A lengthy bridge carries the busway over East Street (pictured) and Allen Street in New Britain

The CTfastrak busway is built on current and former railroad rights-of-way owned by the state and Amtrak, which allowed for the busway to be constructed with minimal taking of private land. From its north end in downtown Hartford to Newington Junction station, the busway occupies the north side of Amtrak's New Haven–Springfield Line right of way. That section of the line was once 4 tracks (shared by two separate railroads) and is now two tracks, with the busway occupying the third and fourth track slots. From Newington Junction to its south end at Downtown New Britain station, the busway follows the former Newington Secondary rail line.

Along much of its length, CTfastrak is constructed as a grade-separated limited-access highway. There are three at-grade crossings of local roads in New Britain, one in the Elmwood section of West Hartford, and one in Hartford (the latter two shared with the New Haven–Springfield Line). Buses can additionally enter and leave the busway via access roads at Downtown New Britain, East Street, Cedar Street, Newington Junction, and Sigourney Street stations and at the north end of the busway at Asylum Street in Hartford. A lengthy bridge was constructed over East Street (CT-175) and Allen Street in New Britain to eliminate former grade crossings.

From New Britain to Newington Junction, a fenced multi-use trail was constructed alongside the busway. Such a trail was not possible on the northern section, where all available room was needed for an access road for Amtrak maintenance vehicles.

The busway has ten stations of varying size. Downtown New Britain is a sprawling complex with numerous bus bays and large shelters to support transfers between CTfastrak services and local CT Transit services. Flatbush Avenue and Sigourney Street have large island platforms and off-busway loops. The remaining seven stations have basic side platforms and small shelters, with ramps to street level. All stations except East Main Street have center passing lanes to allow express buses to pass stopped local buses.

== Services ==
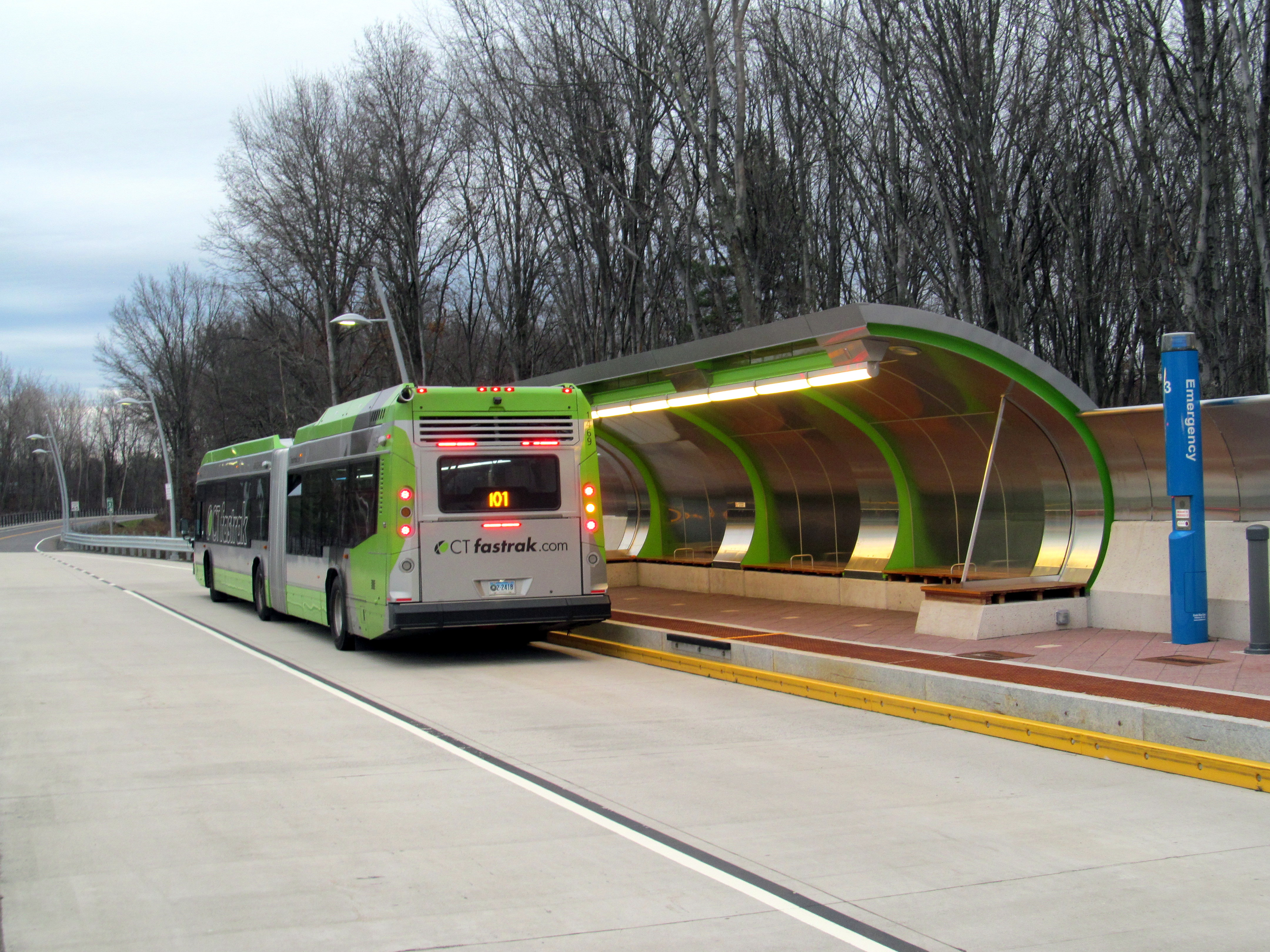
CTfastrak bus on route 101 at Cedar Street

As of December 2016, twelve CT Transit routes use the CTfastrak busway with a variety of stopping patterns.

Nine routes provide local stopping service on various sections of the busway:

- 101 Hartford/New Britain
- 102 Hartford/New Britain/Bristol
- 121 MCC/Hartford/UConn Health
- 125 Berlin Tpke
- 128 Hartford/Westfarms–New Britain via Stanley Street
- 140 CCSU Shuttle
- 144 Wethersfield/Westfarms
- 153 Elmwood/Copaco
- 161 St. Francis Hospital/Hartford Hospital

The 101 Hartford/New Britain route provides high-frequency all-stops base service between New Britain and downtown Hartford, with headways of 7.5 minutes at peak, 12 minutes off-peak, and 20 minutes during the evening.

The 102 makes the same stops as the 101 but extends past New Britain to Bristol, Connecticut; it operates at a lower frequency than the 101. The 121 uses the busway from Cedar Street to Sigourney Street, while the 128 uses the busway from Elmwood to Union Station.

Two routes run express on the busway from Downtown New Britain to Sigourney Street, making no intermediate stops:

- 923 Bristol Express
- 928 Southington–Cheshire–Waterbury Express

Four other routes – 144, 153, and 161, as well as the 140(F) – act as feeder services. They make stops at CTfastrak station platforms but do not run on the busway, with the exception of the 140 and 144, which use the busway between Cedar Street and East Street. Other times throughout the day it enters the busway at Newington Junction station as the 140F and continues to East Street.

== History ==
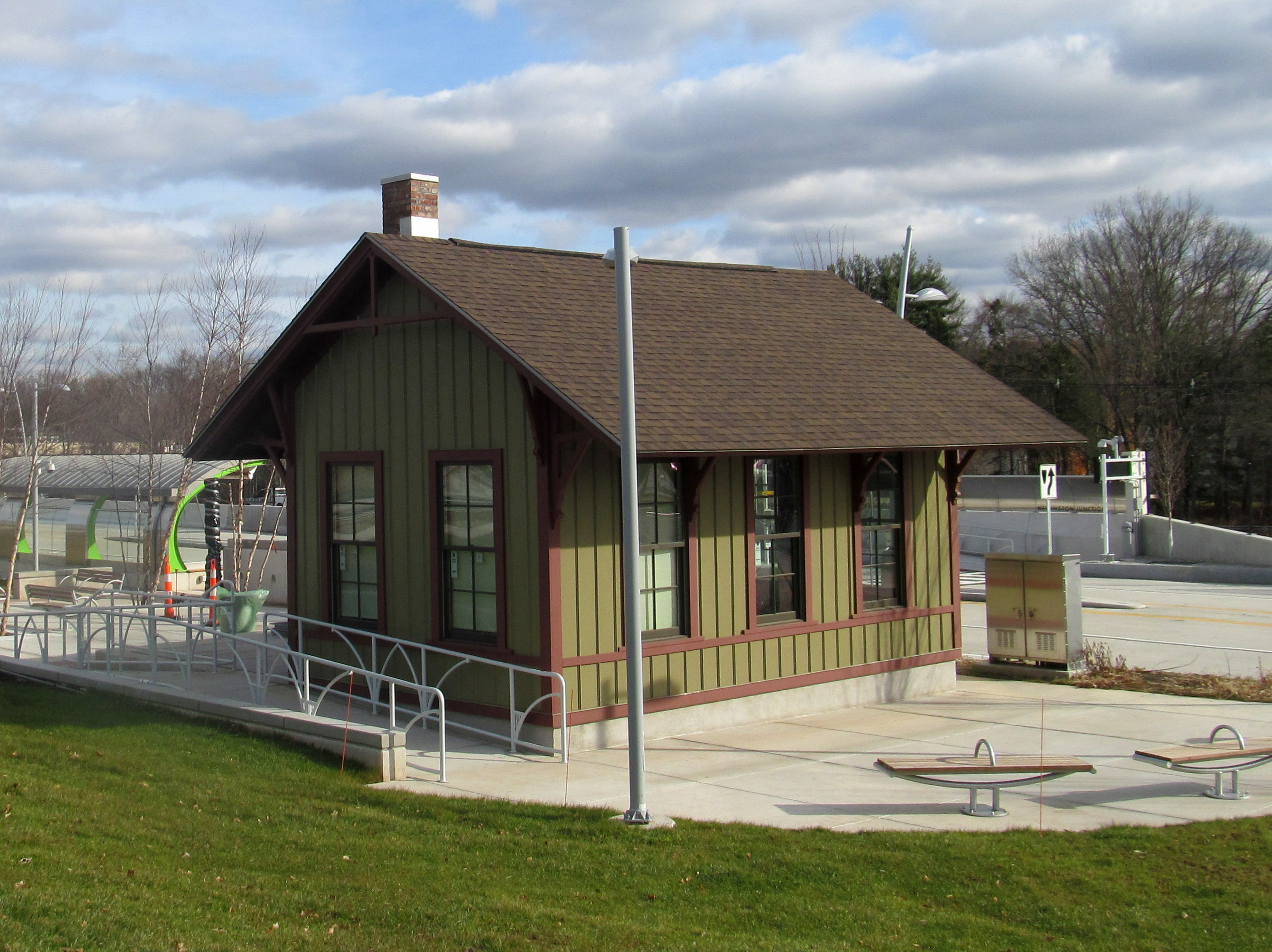
The former New York & New England Railroad station at Newington Junction was moved and restored during the construction of a CTfastrak station at the site

In 2001, a dedicated busway transit project was judged to be the most cost-effective way of relieving congestion on Interstate 84 between Hartford, West Hartford, Newington and New Britain. The 9.4-mile (15.1 km) line was projected to cost $570 million, of which $400 million was funded by federal grants.

The project officially broke ground on May 22, 2012 and opened to the public on March 28, 2015.

Proof of payment is used for fare collection along the route. On June 23, 2015, CTDOT began issuing $75 tickets for riders found to have not paid their fare.

Preliminary work estimated a $10 million annual cost of running the various CTfastrak routes and new feeder services. In September 2015, CTtransit released that the yearly cost would be substantially higher at $17.5 million.

In October 2019, the state applied for a federal grant to test autonomous buses on the CTfastrak busway beginning in 2020. As of August 25, 2024, CTfastrak added Route 125 as a connection between Downtown Hartford, Newington, and the Berlin Turnpike.

=== Hartford Line ===
The Hartford Line commuter rail service between New Haven, Connecticut and Springfield, Massachusetts via Hartford commenced on June 16, 2018. It initially connects to CTfastrak at Union Station. Hartford Line stations adjacent to the CTfastrak stops at West Hartford (Flatbush Avenue) and Newington Junction are planned to open later.

The 2012 environmental assessment for the Hartford Line included preliminary plans for four infill stations including West Hartford and Newington Junction; although they were not yet funded, this would allow future planning and construction to be expedited. On January 12, 2015, the state announced that $5.75 million in funding would be made available for environmental mitigation and design at ten Hartford Line and New Haven Line stations, including design funding for Hartford Line platforms at West Hartford and Newington Junction.

=== CTfastrak East ===
Planning began in early 2016 for extending CTfastrak service to communities east of Hartford. The expansion would incorporate many of the BRT features of the existing system, including branded buses, large shelters, real-time information, and frequent all-day service. However, it would run on existing HOV lanes on I-84 and I-384 rather than a dedicated busway.
