= Downtown New Britain station =

Downtown New Britain
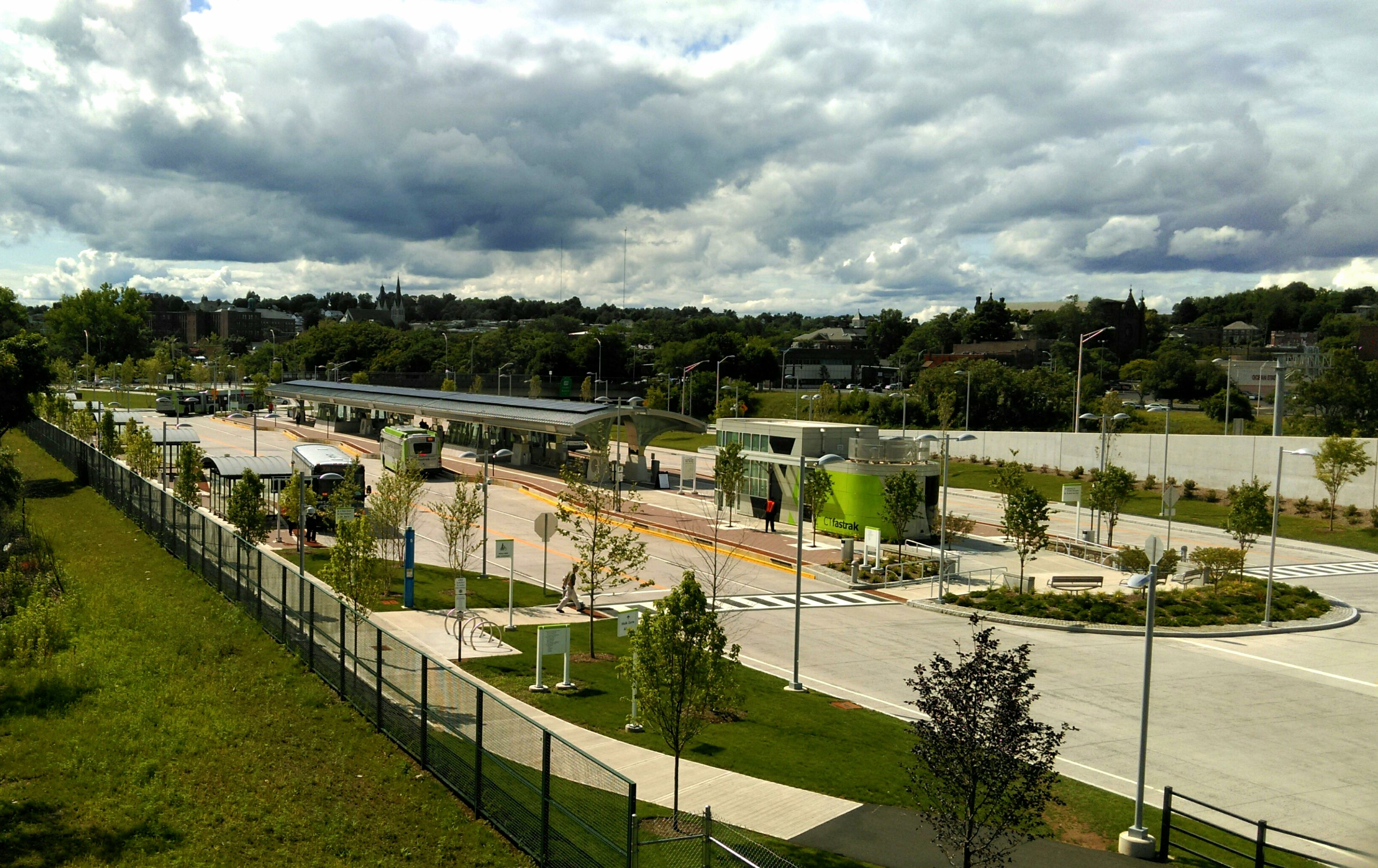
- Downtown New Britain station in June 2015

General information
- Location: East Main Street and Harvard Street; New Britain, Connecticut
- Coordinates: 41.6685°N 72.7800°W
- Owner: ConnDOT
- Operator: Connecticut Transit
- Bus routes: 101, 102, 128, 505, 506, 507, 509, 511, 513, 923, 928
- Bus stands: 19 bays
- Connections: 41, 501, 502, 503, 510, 512, HNB (on Columbus Boulevard)

Construction
- Cycle facilities: Yes
- Accessible: Yes

History
- Opened: March 28, 2015

Services
Preceding station	CT Transit	Following station
Terminus	CT Fastrak	East Main Street toward Hartford
Location

Downtown New Britain is a bus rapid transit station and the terminus of the CTfastrak line, located just south of Route 72 off Columbus Boulevard and Main Street in New Britain, Connecticut. It opened with the line on March 28, 2015. The station consists of one side platform and one island platform, comprising a collective total of 19 bus bays for CTfastrak local and express services, plus local CT Transit buses which do not use the busway. The station is located at the site of New Britain's former railroad station, which saw service from 1850 to 1960.

== Railroad history ==
The Hartford and New Haven Railroad (H&NH) opened through the far east part of New Britain in 1839. The railroad quickly established a New Britain station on what is now New Britain Avenue (CT-174) just over the Wethersfield border, possibly in a privately owned building or house. It was replaced with a dedicated station at the same location in 1848.

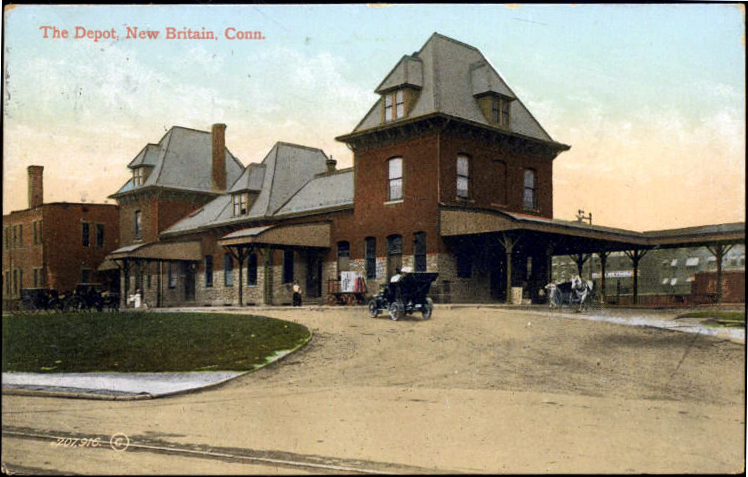
1910 postcard of the 1887-built New Britain station

The Hartford, Providence and Fishkill Railroad (HP&F) opened in 1850; it shared the H&NH right of way north of Newington Junction, but diverged to the south and ran to downtown New Britain and beyond. The HP&F established their own station just east of Main Street; the H&NH then moved their New Britain station north to Newington and finally Newington Junction. The H&NH established their own branch from Middletown to New Britain via Berlin in 1865, sharing the HP&F station.

The station may have been expanded in 1876, but by the 1880s it was in poor condition and publicly maligned. The state legislature ordered a new union station in 1884, which was completed in 1887. A retail arcade stretching west from the station, unique on the New Haven Railroad, was completed within the next three years. It proved profitable but the railroad declined to pursue similar dedicated retail spaces at other stations, stating they were "not in that kind of business".

Passenger service declined in the 20th century; service on the branch to Middletown ended in 1932. Waterbury–Boston intercity service via New Britain, including the Nutmeg, operated until 1955. The city purchased the station in November 1956; it was demolished at the end of the month and replaced with a parking lot weeks after. Tickets were thereafter sold from an office in the arcade. Waterbury-Hartford local service ended on January 22, 1960, replaced with buses to Newington Junction. The ticket office closed on September 16, 1960, leaving only local buses serving New Britain.

== Future ==
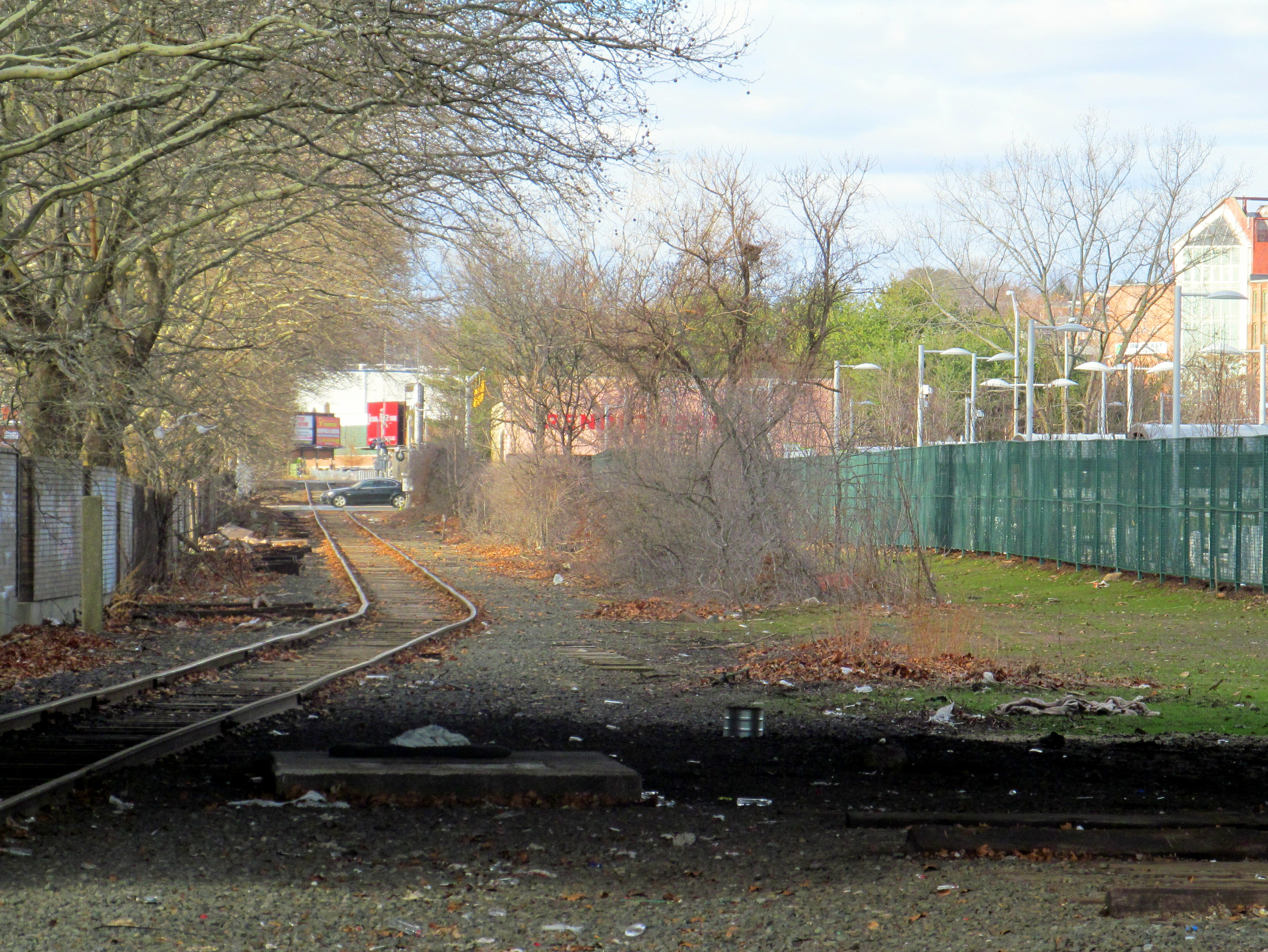
Site for a rail platform recommended in the 2013 study

The 2013 Central Connecticut Rail Study, which analyzed the possibility for commuter rail from Waterbury to Hartford via New Britain and Berlin, recommended placing a rail platform on the straight section of track just south of the bus platforms. This would allow a cross-platform transfer between trains and buses.
