= Davis & Brooks =

Practice information
- Founders: F. Irvin Davis; William F. Brooks
- Founded: 1897
- Dissolved: 1919
- Location: Hartford, Connecticut

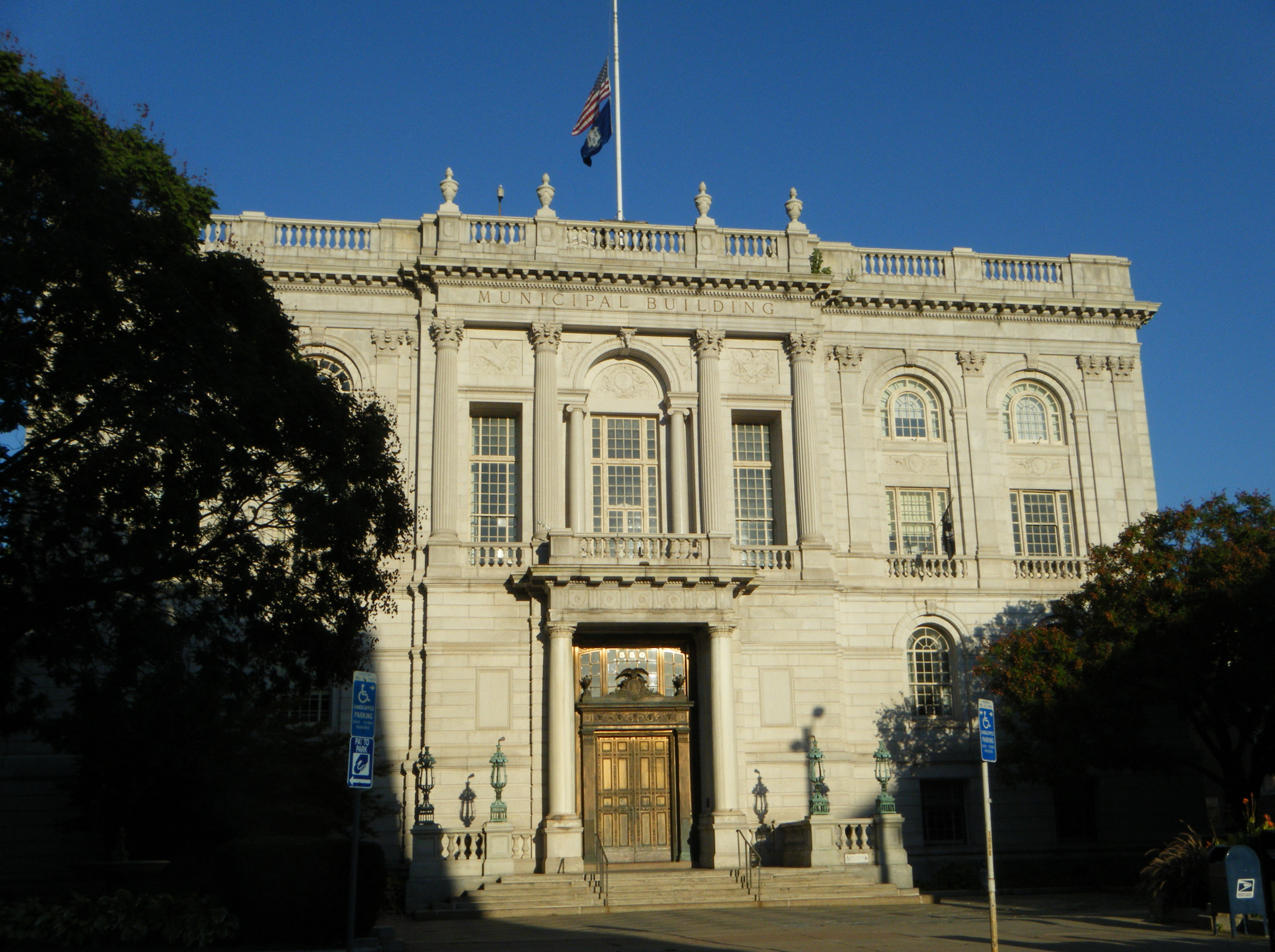
Hartford Municipal Building, Hartford, Connecticut, 1912–15.

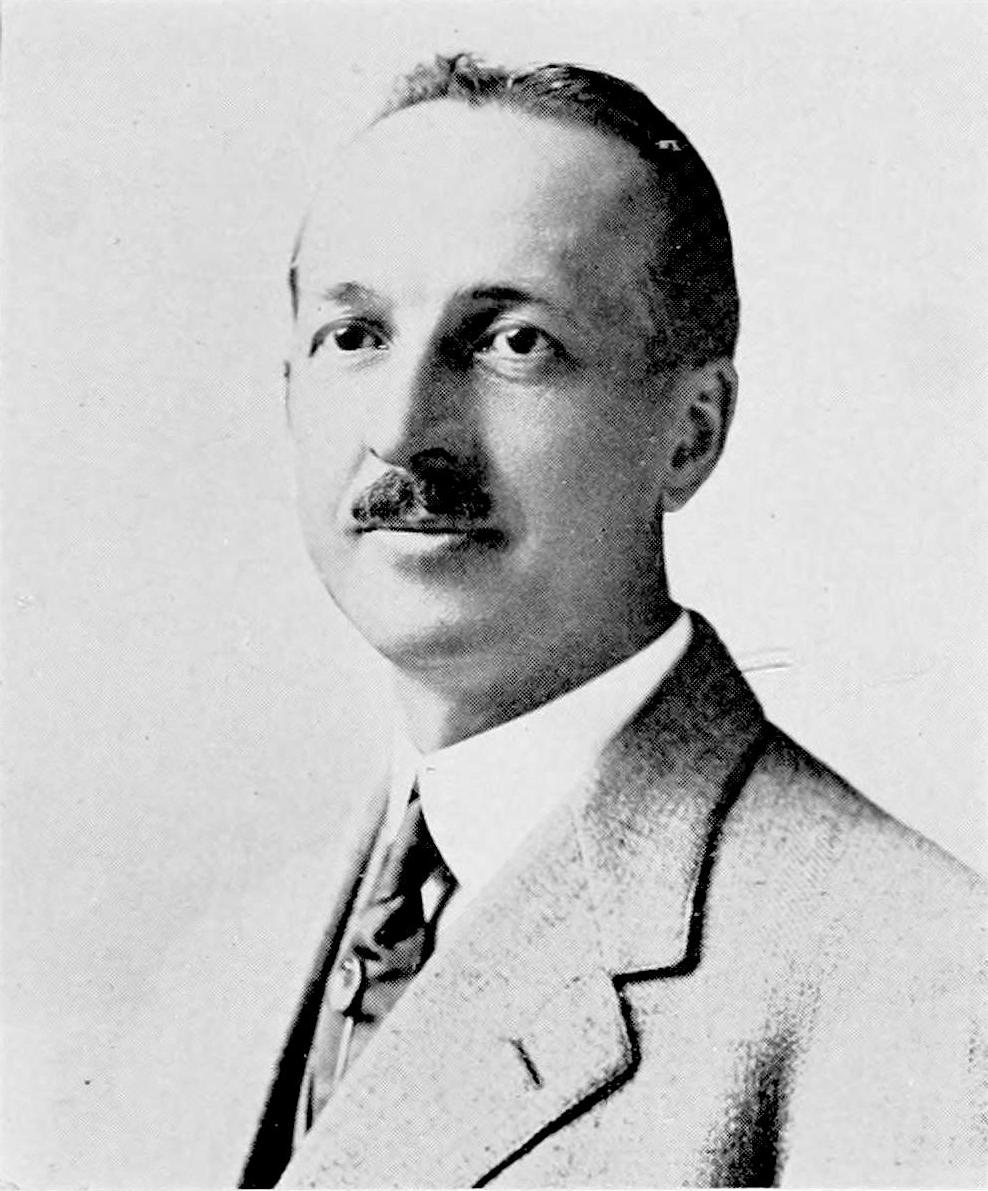
F. Irvin Davis, circa 1912.

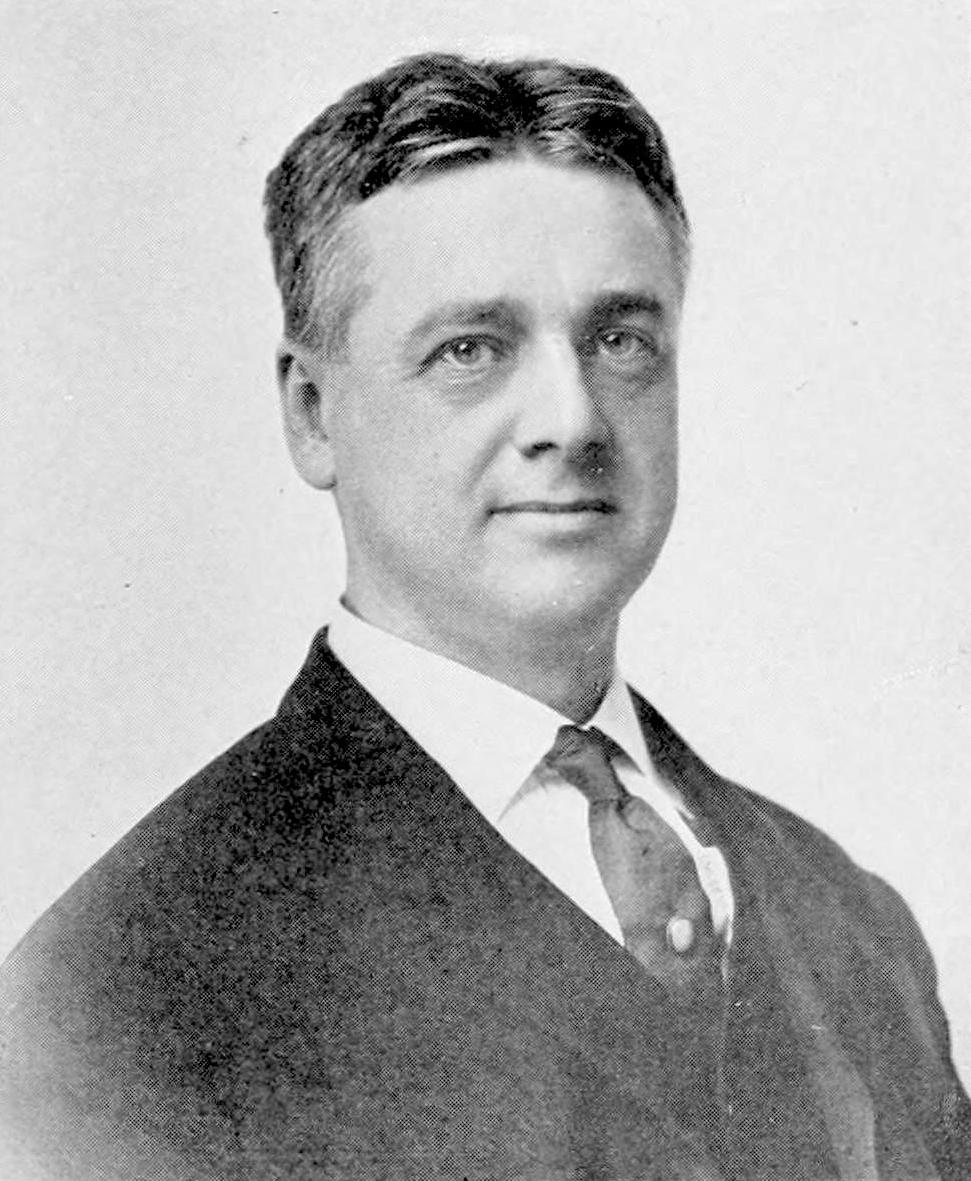
William F. Brooks, circa 1912.

Davis & Brooks was an American architectural firm based in Hartford, Connecticut, active from 1897 to 1919. It was established by F. Irvin Davis (1869-1944) and William F. Brooks (1872-1950). Among their projects is the Hartford Municipal Building, completed in 1915.

== Firm history ==
F. Irvin Davis and William F. Brooks formed their partnership on May 19, 1897, in New Britain, Connecticut. In 1901, Davis & Brooks moved to Hartford where they formed a partnership with Francis W. Crosby, an association that lasted only one year. Davis & Brooks continued to practice in Hartford from 1902 until the partnership was dissolved in 1919, after which Davis retired from architecture and Brooks continued the practice as sole proprietor.

== Biographies of founders ==
=== F. Irvin Davis ===
Frank Irvin Davis was born April 28, 1869, in Wiscasset, Maine, to Roswell and Mary Louise Davis. He attended the Massachusetts Institute of Technology in Boston, coming to New Britain after his 1892 graduation to work as an architect for P. & F. Corbin, manufacturers. By 1894, he was practicing architecture on his own account. By 1896, he was associated with architect F. D. Moon as Davis & Moon. This partnership was dissolved in 1897, at which time Davis associated with Brooks. When the firm of Davis & Brooks was dissolved in 1919, Davis entered the insurance business and later established a travel agency.

In 1896, Davis married Eunice Stebbins Parker, with whom he had three children. Davis died on August 21, 1944.

=== William F. Brooks ===
William Frederick Brooks was born on February 26, 1872, in New York, New York. He attended Columbia University, graduating in 1893. After studying for two years in Europe he returned to the United States, working for the architect Ernest Flagg until coming to New Britain in 1897 to work with Davis. After their partnership was dissolved in 1919, Brooks practiced independently until a few years before his death. For part of this period, Franklin D. W. Glazier was associated with the firm.

After Davis & Brooks moved their main office to Hartford, Brooks continued to live in New Britain. He died there on March 4, 1950.

== Legacy ==
At least three of Davis & Brooks’ buildings have been listed individually on the United States National Register of Historic Places for their architectural excellence, while several others contribute to designated historic districts.

== Architectural works ==
- Monroe Street School, New Britain, Connecticut (1897–98, demolished)
- New Britain Public Library, New Britain, Connecticut (1900–01).
- Peck Memorial Library (former), Kensington, Connecticut (1901)
- Camp School, (Note: Now used as housing.) Central Connecticut State University (former campus), New Britain, Connecticut (1902–03 and 1918–19)
- Colonial Trust Company Building, Waterbury, Connecticut (1902, demolished)
- Collis P. Huntington Memorial Library (former), (Note: Presently (2021) the Hampton University Museum.) Hampton University, Hampton, Virginia (1903)
- Orient Insurance Company Building, Hartford, Connecticut (1904–05)
- Gates Building, New Britain, Connecticut (1906).
- Storrs Hall, University of Connecticut, Storrs, Connecticut (1906)
- Noble Hall, Eastern Connecticut State University, Willimantic, Connecticut (1908–10)
- Hartford Municipal Building, (Note: Designed in association with Palmer & Hornbostel of New York and Pittsburgh.) Hartford, Connecticut (1912–15, NRHP-listed 1981)
- Fourth Congregational Church, (Note: In this project, the portico and tower of the congregation's 1850 building was disassembled and rebuilt as part of the new building.) Hartford, Connecticut (1913–14, NRHP-listed 1982)
- Koons Hall, University of Connecticut, Storrs, Connecticut (1913)
- Noah Webster Memorial Library (former), West Hartford, Connecticut (1915–17, NRHP-listed 1981)
- Burr Hall, Eastern Connecticut State University, Willimantic, Connecticut (1919–21)
- Judd Building, Hartford, Connecticut (1923, demolished)
- Dime Savings Bank Building, Hartford, Connecticut (1925, demolished)
- University Club, Hartford, Connecticut (1926)
- Children's Library, New Britain Public Library, New Britain, Connecticut (1931)

Private residences designed by Davis & Brooks can be found in the Prospect Avenue Historic District of Hartford, the West End Historic District of New Britain and the J. B. Williams Co. Historic District of Glastonbury.

== Gallery of architectural works ==
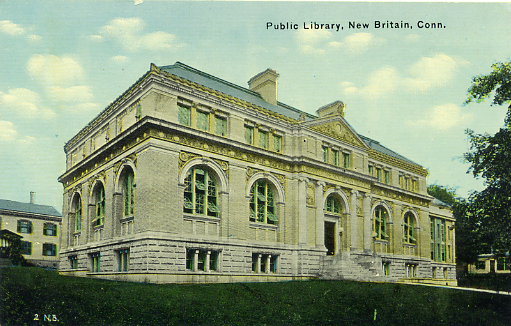
New Britain Public Library, New Britain, Connecticut, 1900-01.

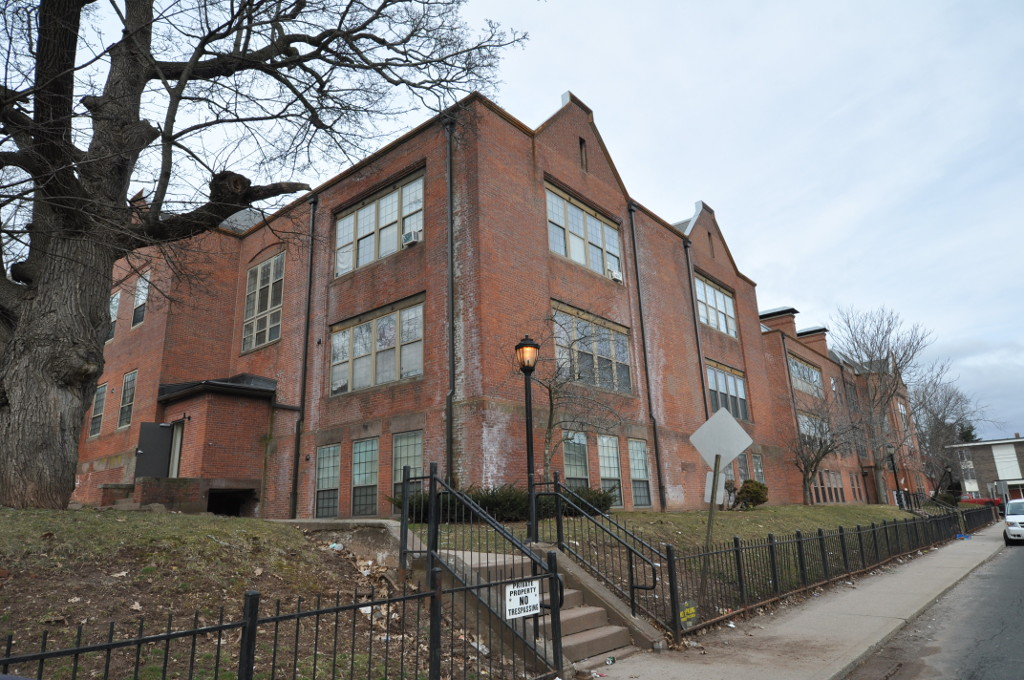
Camp School, Central Connecticut State University (former campus), New Britain, Connecticut, 1902-03 and 1918-19.

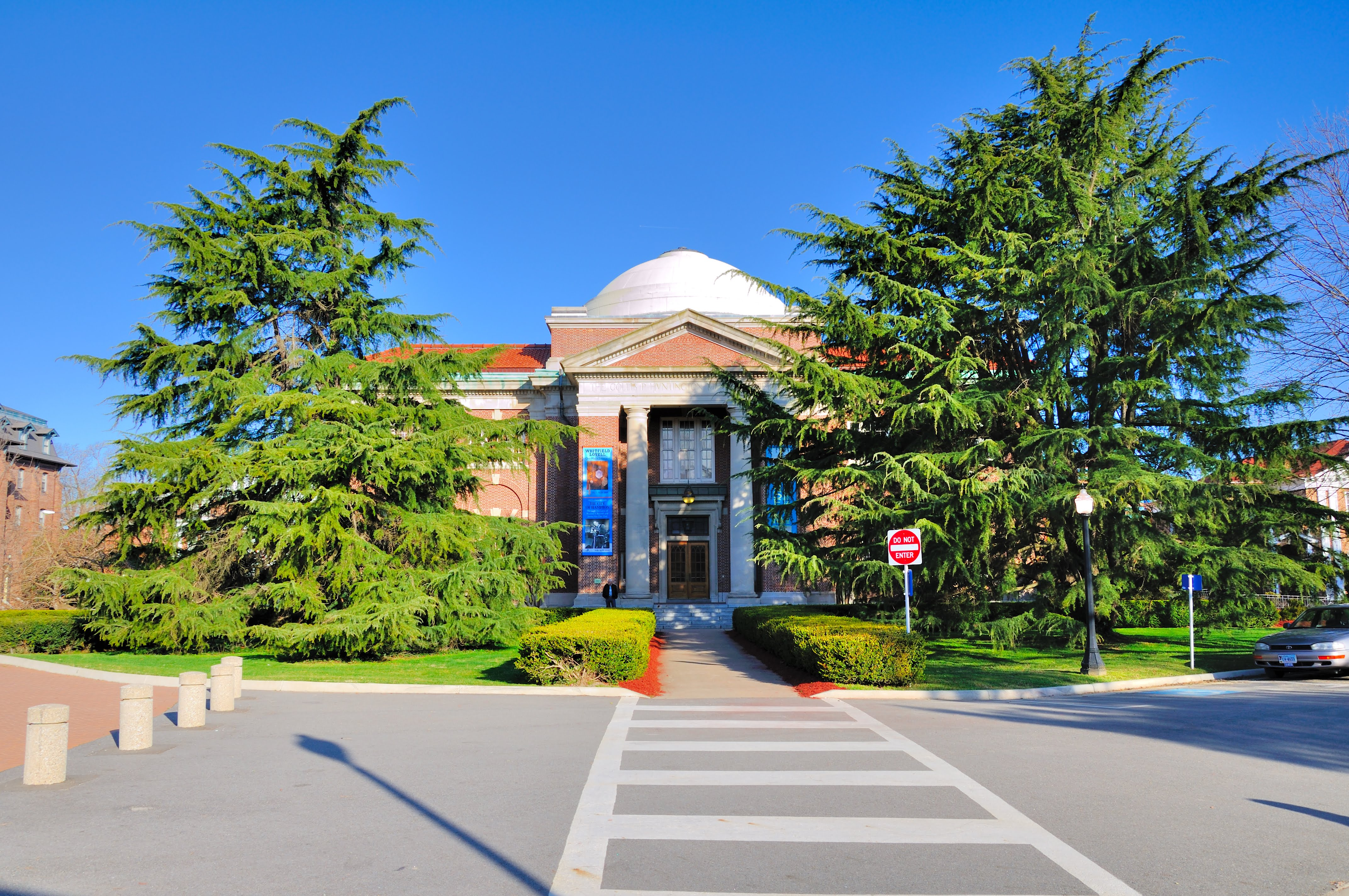
Collis P. Huntington Memorial Library (former), Hampton University, Hampton, Virginia, 1903.

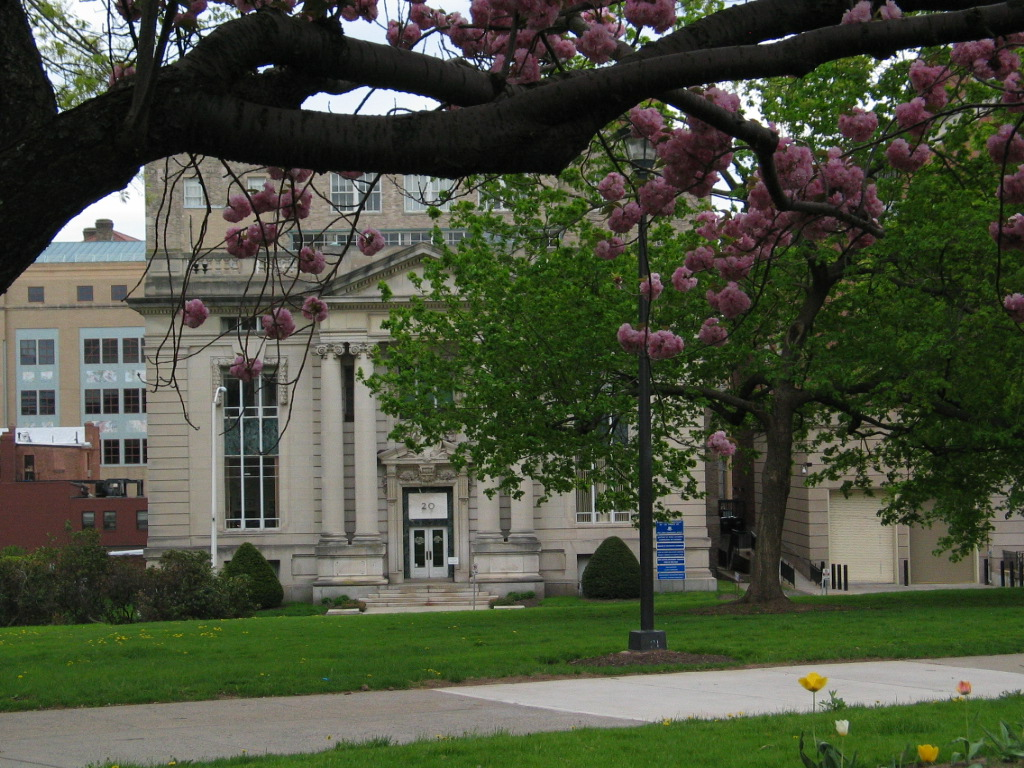
Orient Insurance Company Building, Hartford, Connecticut, 1904-05.

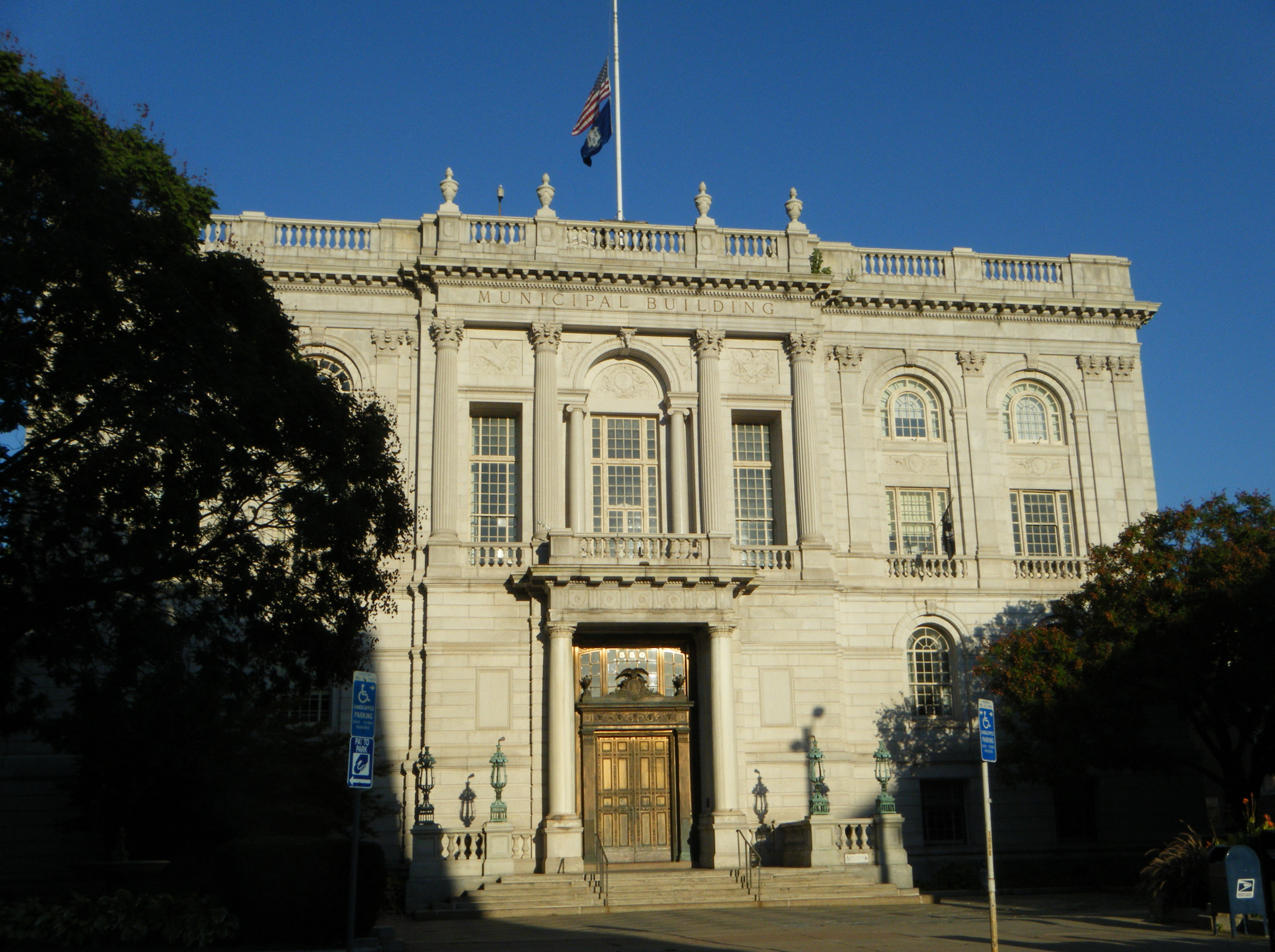
Hartford Municipal Building, Hartford, Connecticut, 1912-15.

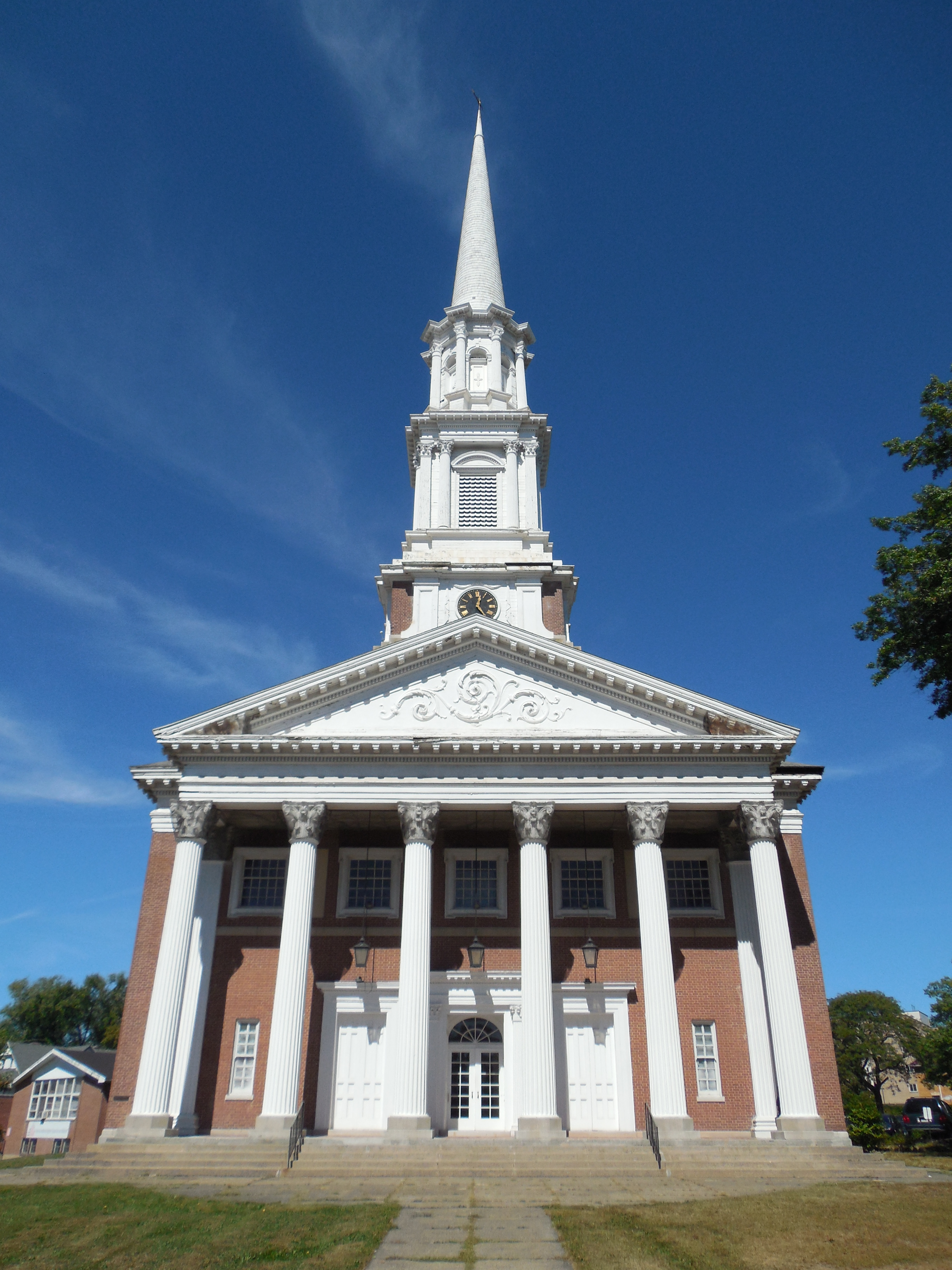
Fourth Congregational Church, Hartford, Connecticut, 1913-14.

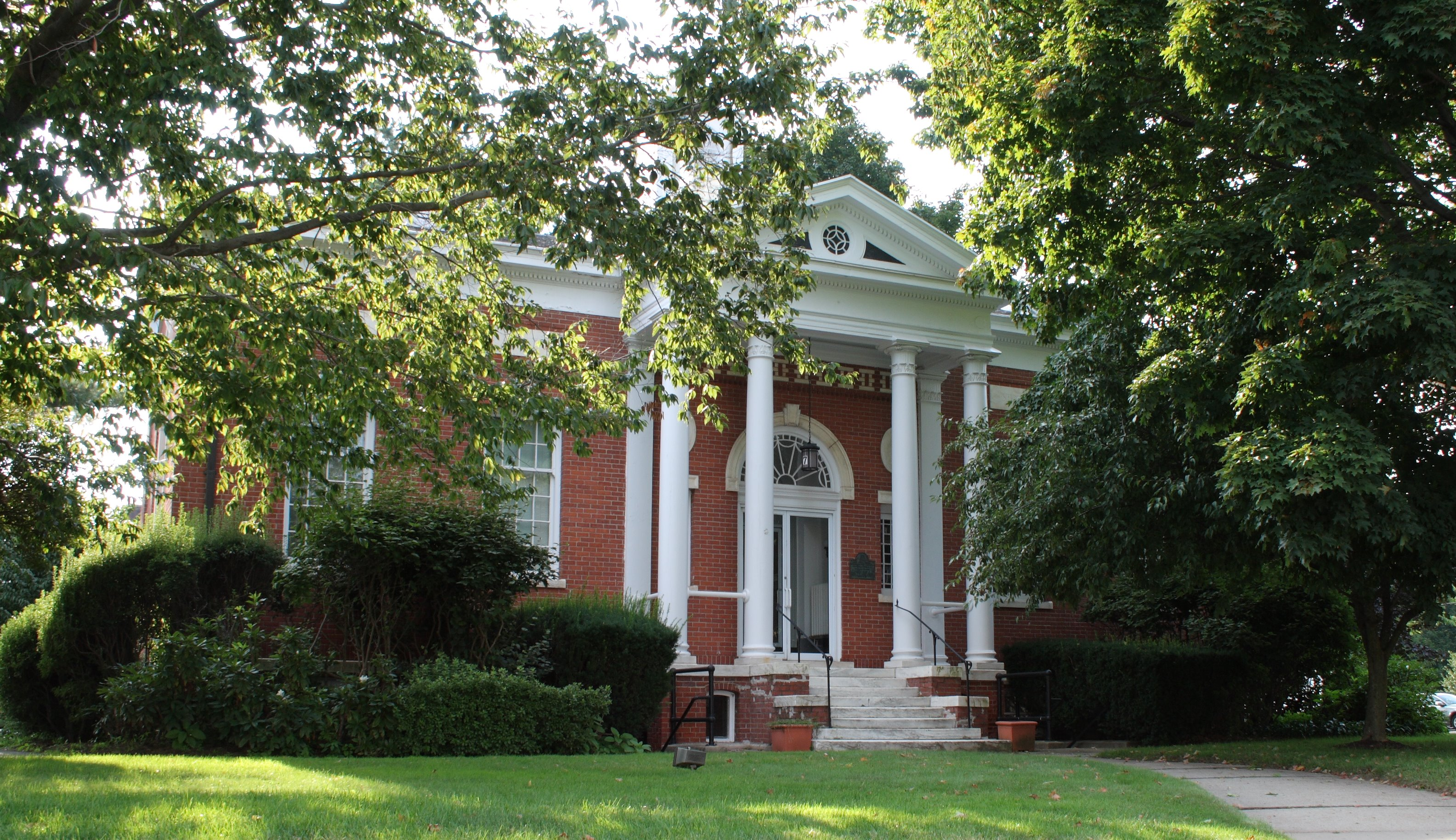
Noah Webster Memorial Library (former), West Hartford, Connecticut, 1915-17.
