= Municipal Building (Hartford, Connecticut) =

- Hartford Municipal Building
- U.S. National Register of Historic Places
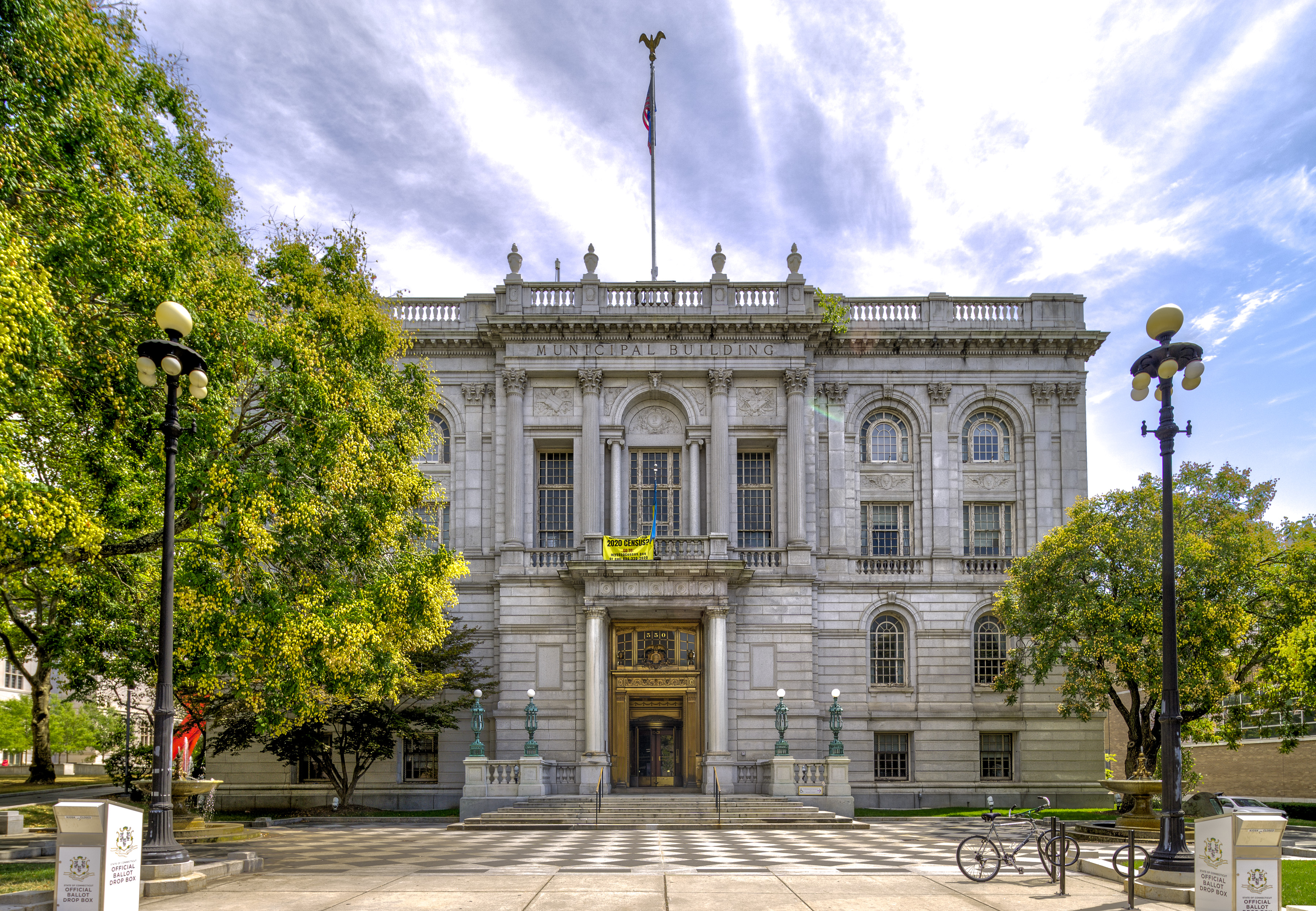

- Location within Connecticut
- Location: 550 Main Street; Hartford, Connecticut, United States
- Coordinates: 41°45′45.4″N 72°40′24.3″W
- Built: 1915
- Architect: Davis & Brooks; Palmer & Hornbostel
- Architectural style: Beaux-Arts
- NRHP reference No.: 81000536
- Added to NRHP: April 27, 1981

The Hartford Municipal Building, also known as Hartford City Hall, is a historic Beaux-Arts structure located at 550 Main Street in Hartford, Connecticut. Completed in 1915, it is a prominent local example of Beaux-Arts architecture, and is the third building to serve as city hall. It was added to the National Register of Historic Places in 1981.

== Description and history ==
Hartford's first city hall was a Greek Revival building, erected in 1827 and located at the corner of Market and Kingsley Streets. In 1897, the city offices were moved to the 1796 Old State House, which the state had made available after construction of the present Connecticut State Capitol. It was soon judged to be too small, and the present building was completed in 1915 after a design competition. Davis & Brooks, the winning architects, were local architects who had recently designed an addition to the high school. They shared the honor with Palmer & Hornbostel of New York and Pittsburgh, who were associated in the design, though the project was executed by Davis & Brooks alone. Land for the building was donated by J. Pierpont Morgan, who sought a suitable use for the parcel adjacent to a wing he had recently donated to the Wadsworth Atheneum.

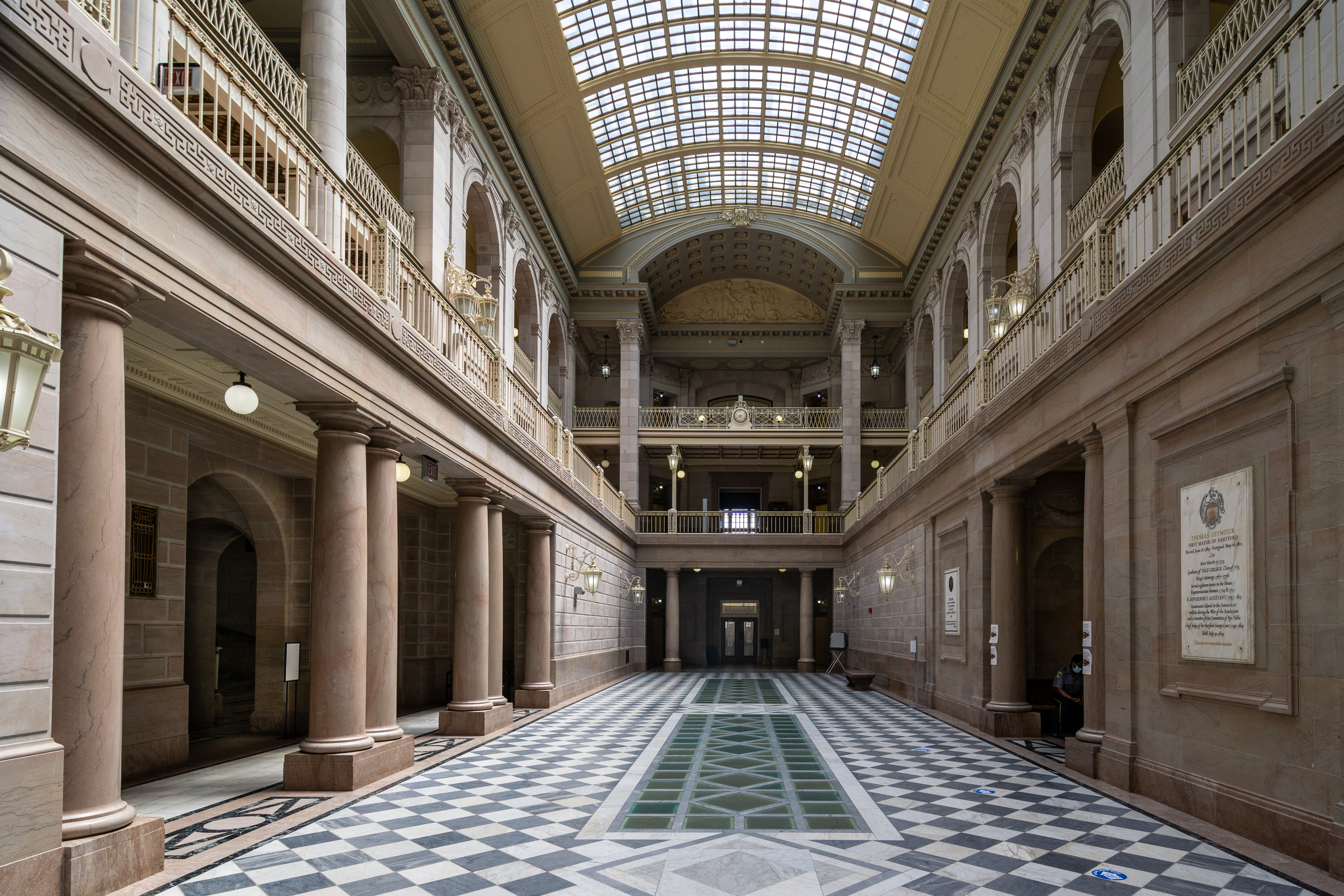
Interior

The Municipal Building is located south of Hartford's downtown central business district, and is bounded on the west, south and east by Main, Arch, and Prospect Streets. It is separated from the Wadsworth Atheneum by the Burr Memorial Mall, a former roadway converted into pedestrian plaza. The structure is built of brick faced with Bethel white granite, a copper and tile roof, and doors made of bronze. It has a three-story central atrium which is 25 feet (7.6 m) wide and 150 feet (46 m) long, decorated with panels depicting the history of the city of Hartford. The basement level has extensive Guastavino tile vaulting.

== See also ==
- National Register of Historic Places listings in Hartford, Connecticut
