= Connecticut Governor's Residence =

Historic house in Connecticut, United States

- Connecticut Governor's Mansion
- U.S. Historic district – Contributing property
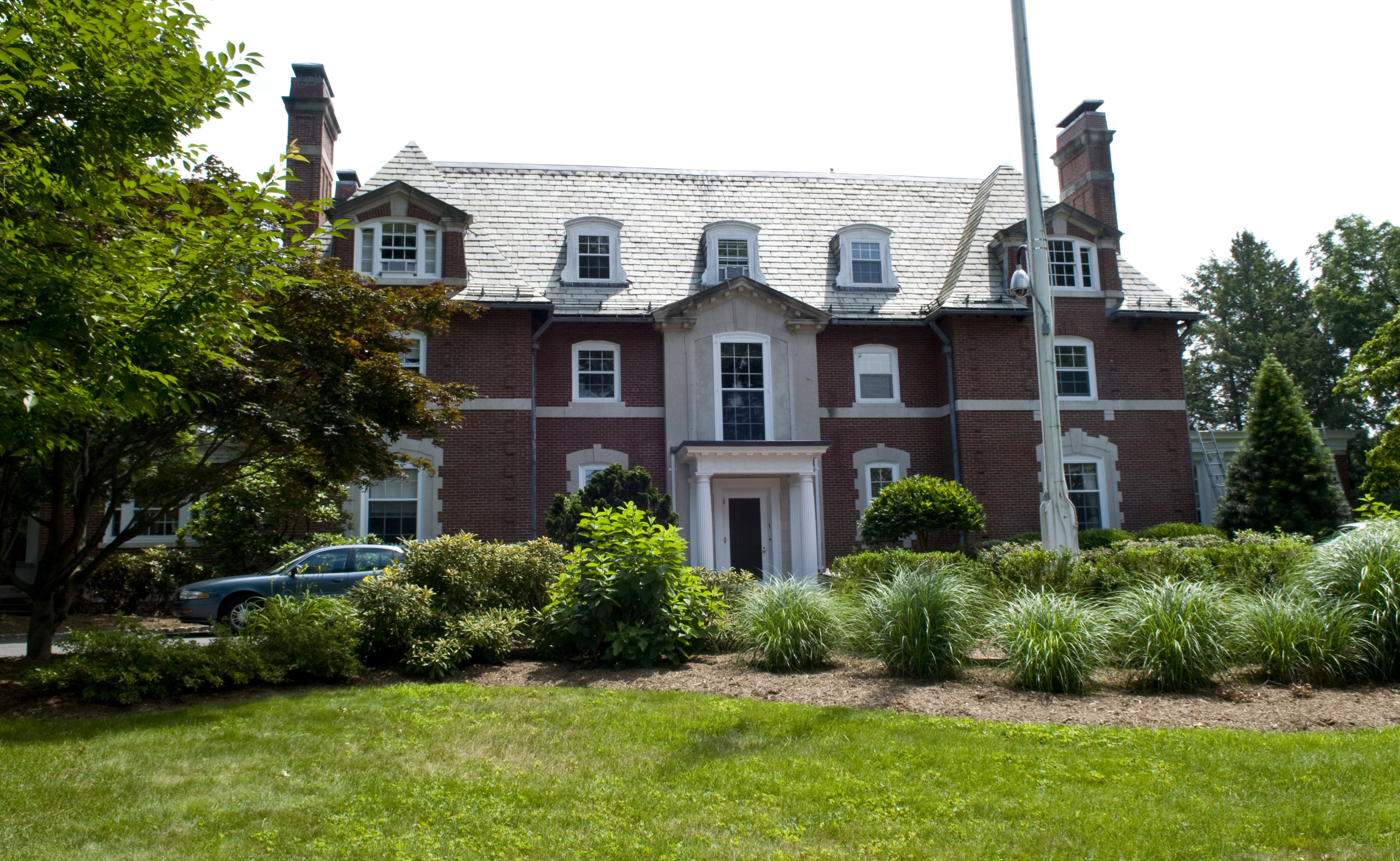

- Location within Connecticut Location within the United States
- Interactive map showing the location for Connecticut Governors’ Mansion
- Location: 990 Prospect Avenue, Hartford, Connecticut
- Coordinates: 41.778497°N 72.713318°W
- Built: 1908-1909
- Architect: Andrews, Jaques & Rantoul; Smith & Bassette
- Architectural style: Georgian Revival
- Part of: Prospect Avenue Historic District (ID85001918)
- Added to NRHP: August 29, 1985

The Connecticut Governor's Residence serves as the official home of the governor of Connecticut. It is located at 990 Prospect Avenue in Hartford.

== Description ==
The Connecticut Governor's Residence has served as the official residence since 1945. The house was originally built in 1909 for George C. F. Williams, a Hartford physician and industrialist. It was designed in the Georgian Revival style by the Boston-based architectural firm of Andrews, Jaques & Rantoul and built at a cost of $337,000. In 1916, Hartford architects Smith & Bassette designed the north and south wing additions. The three-story home originally stood on 14 acres (5.7 ha) that included a grass tennis court, a greenhouse and a number of outbuildings. It remained in the Williams family until 1940. The property was acquired by the State of Connecticut in 1943.

Today, the 19-room residence sits on 4 acres (1.6 ha) and has 15,000 square feet (1,400 m^{2}) of living space with nine fireplaces, nine bathrooms, a pool and a pergola.

The Governor's Mansion is a contributing building in the Prospect Avenue Historic District, which is listed on the National Register of Historic Places.

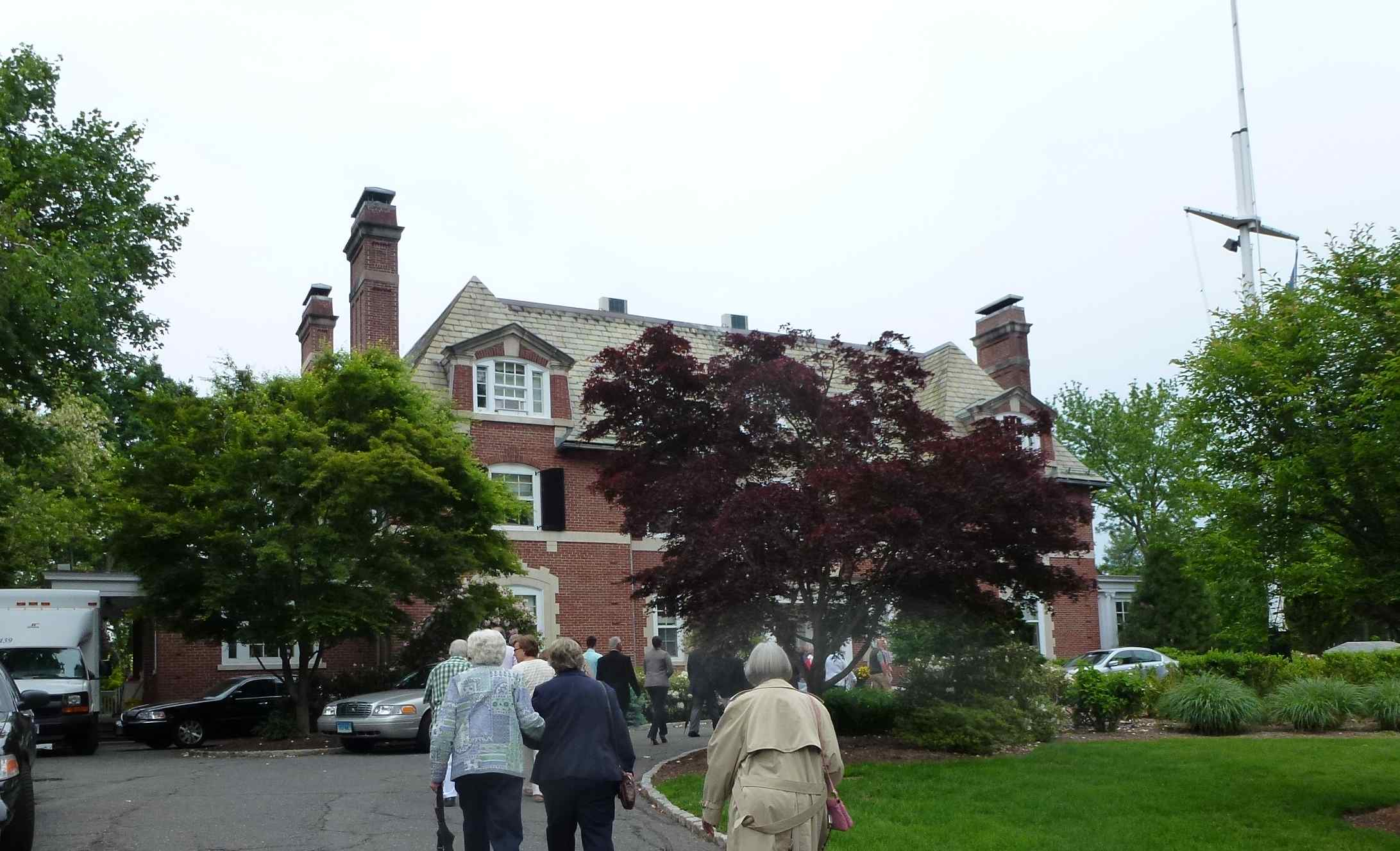
Governor's Mansion, exterior

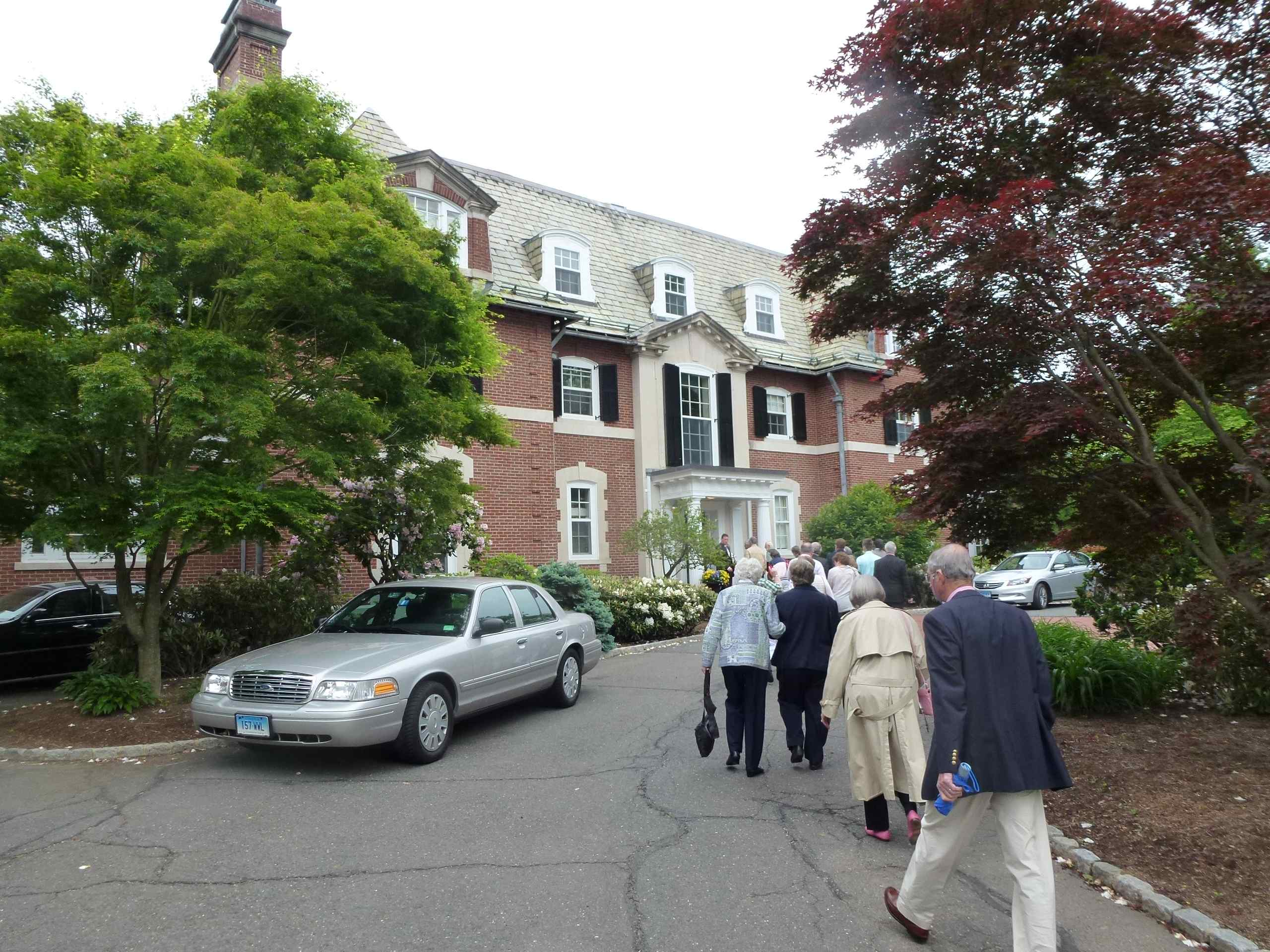
Governor's Mansion, exterior

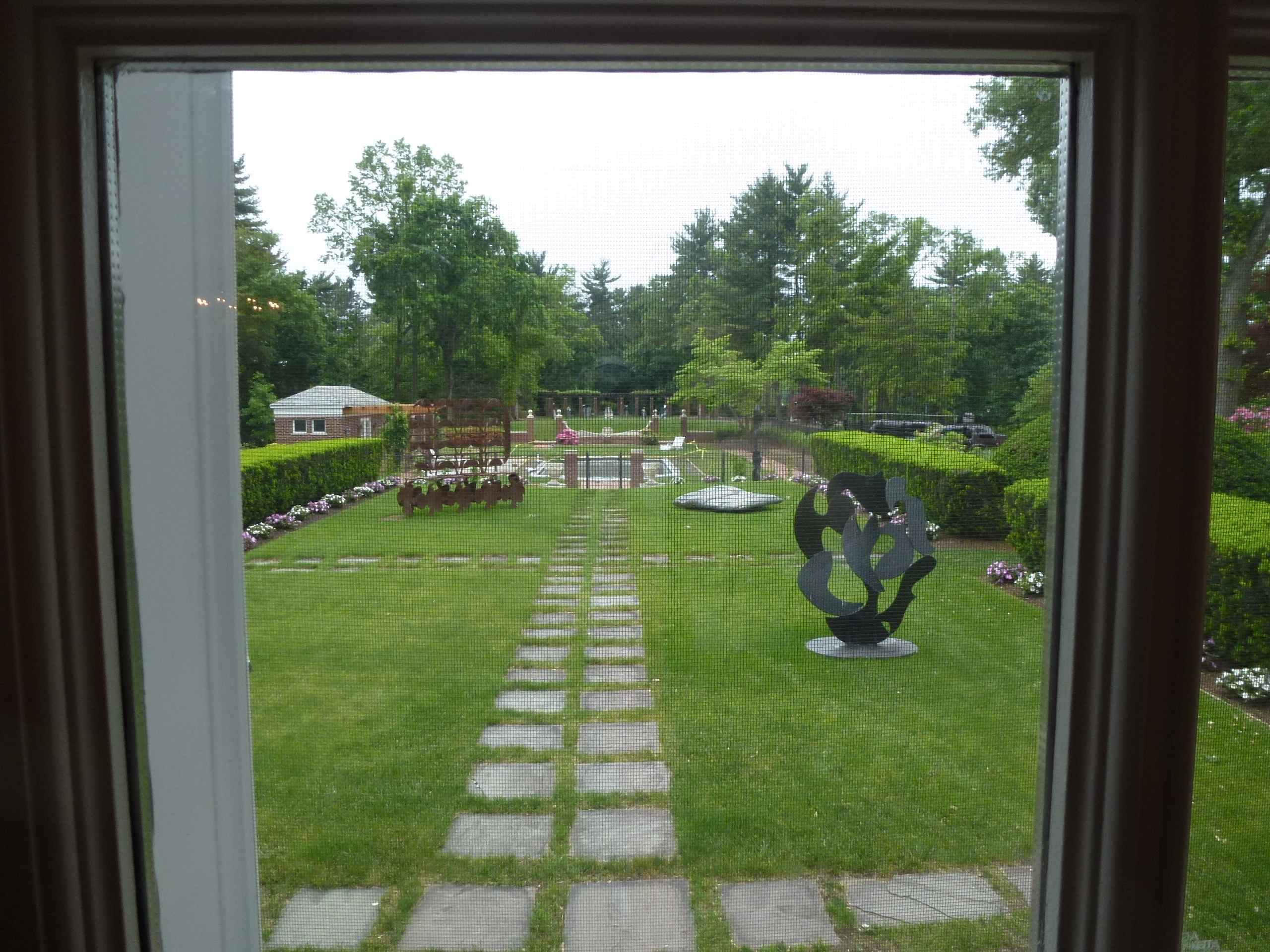
Governor's Mansion grounds adjacent to Asylum ave.

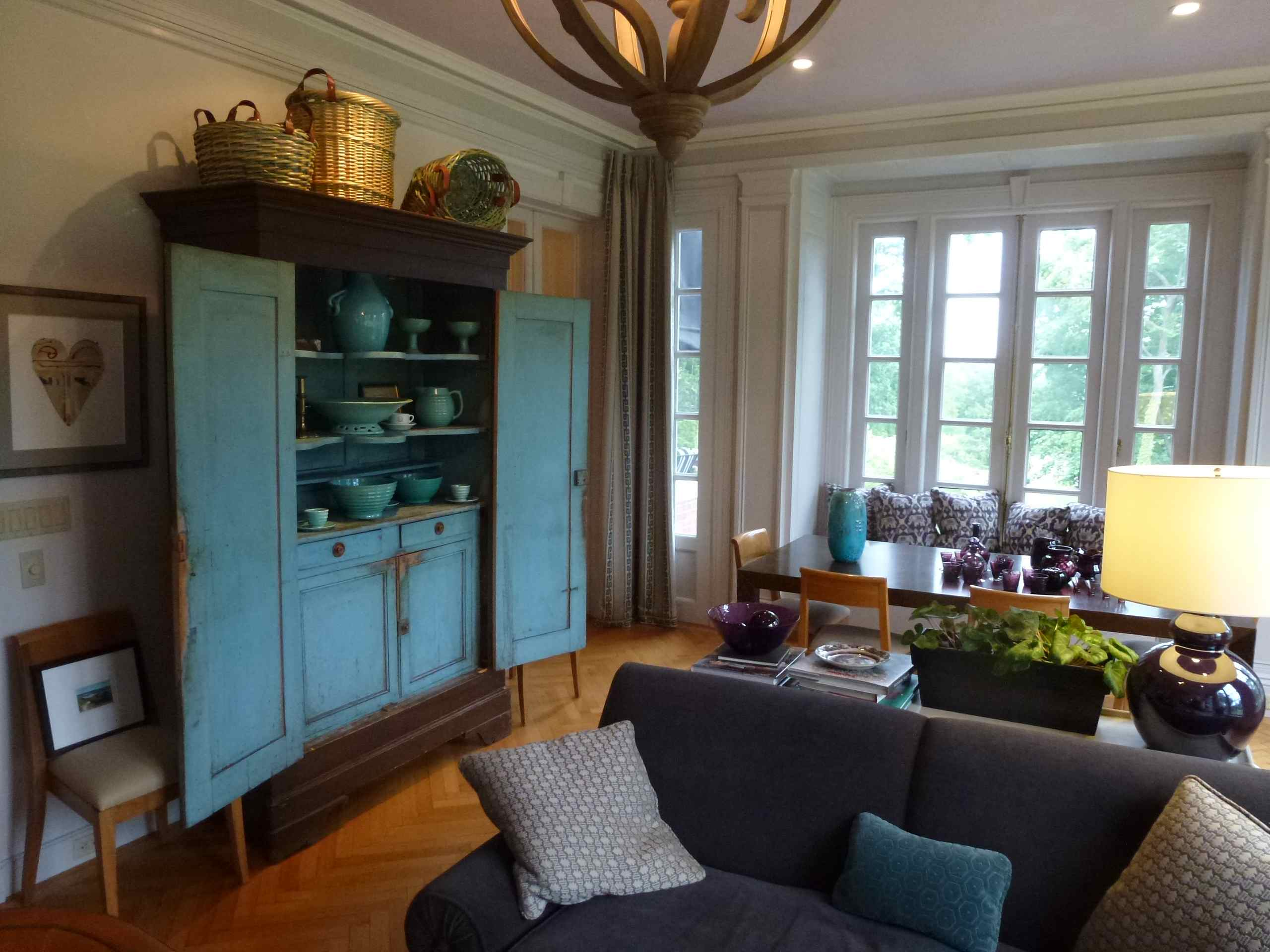
Governor's Mansion interior sitting room

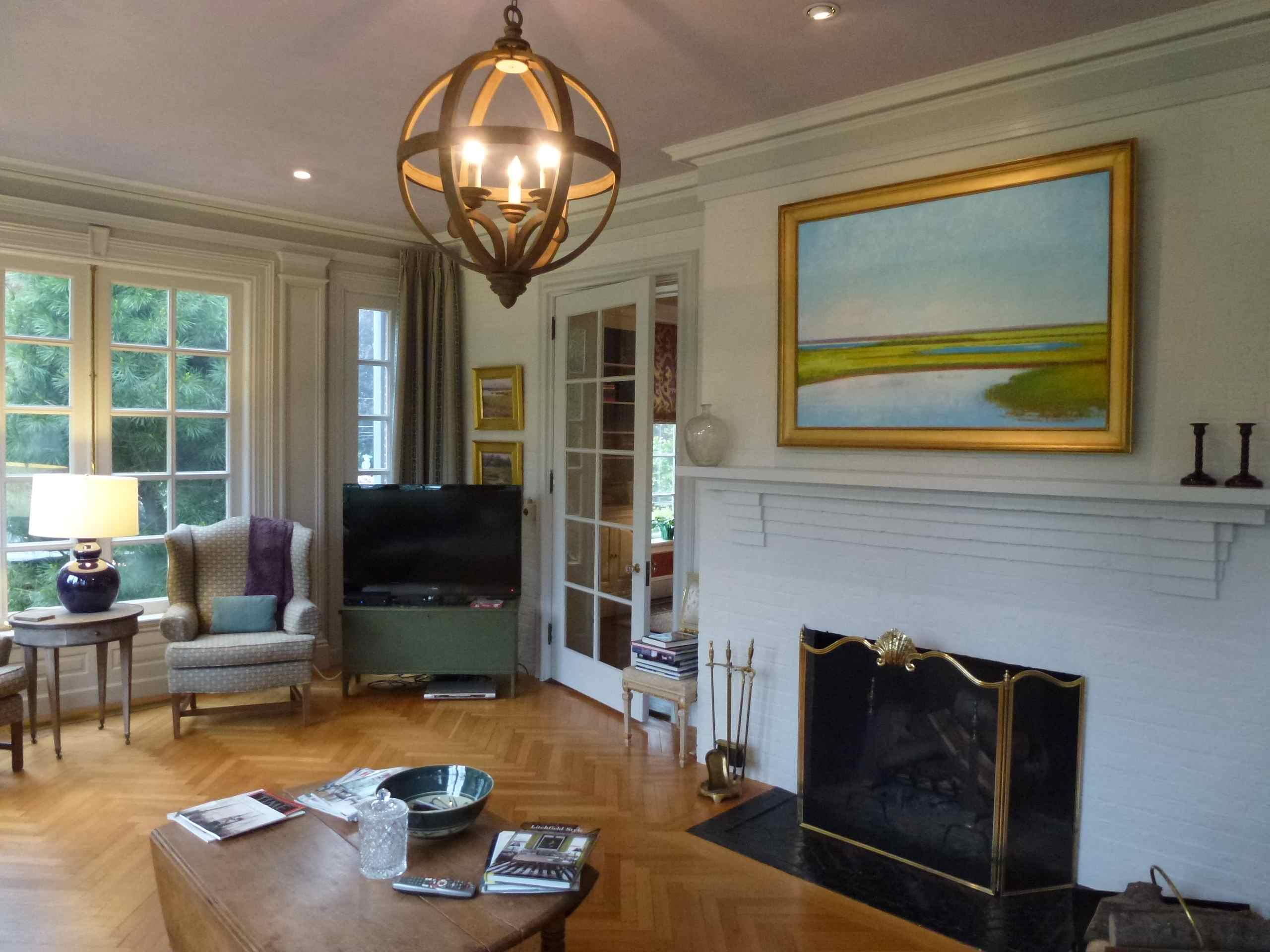
Governor's Mansion interior sitting room
