= John D. Towle =

American architect

- Born: 1804; Newtonville, Massachusetts
- Died: 1887 (aged 82–83); Kansas City, Missouri
- Occupation: Architect
- Buildings: Shawmut Congregational Church, Newton High School, College Street Congregational Church, William G. Fargo House

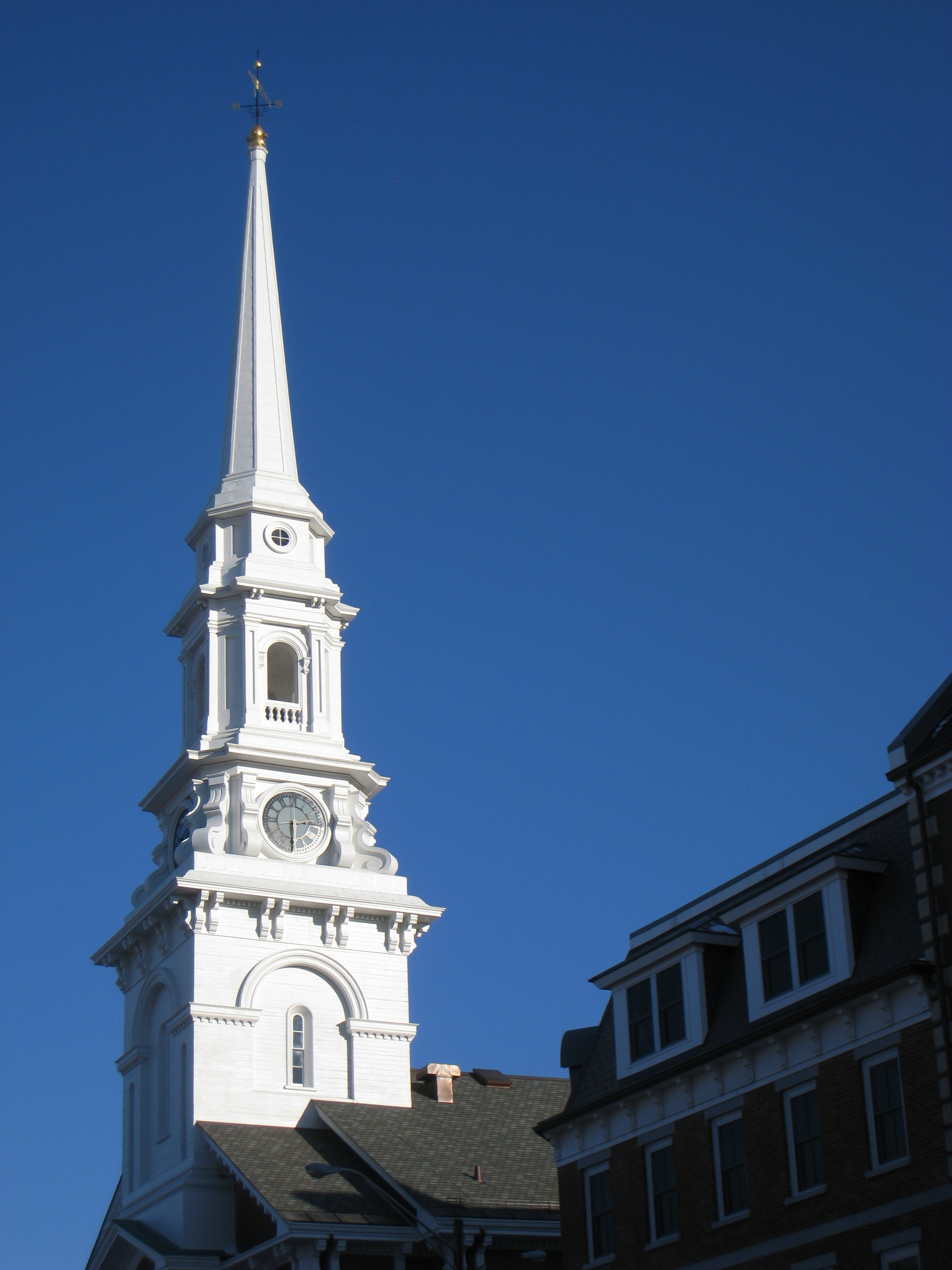
Spire, North Church, Portsmouth, 1852.

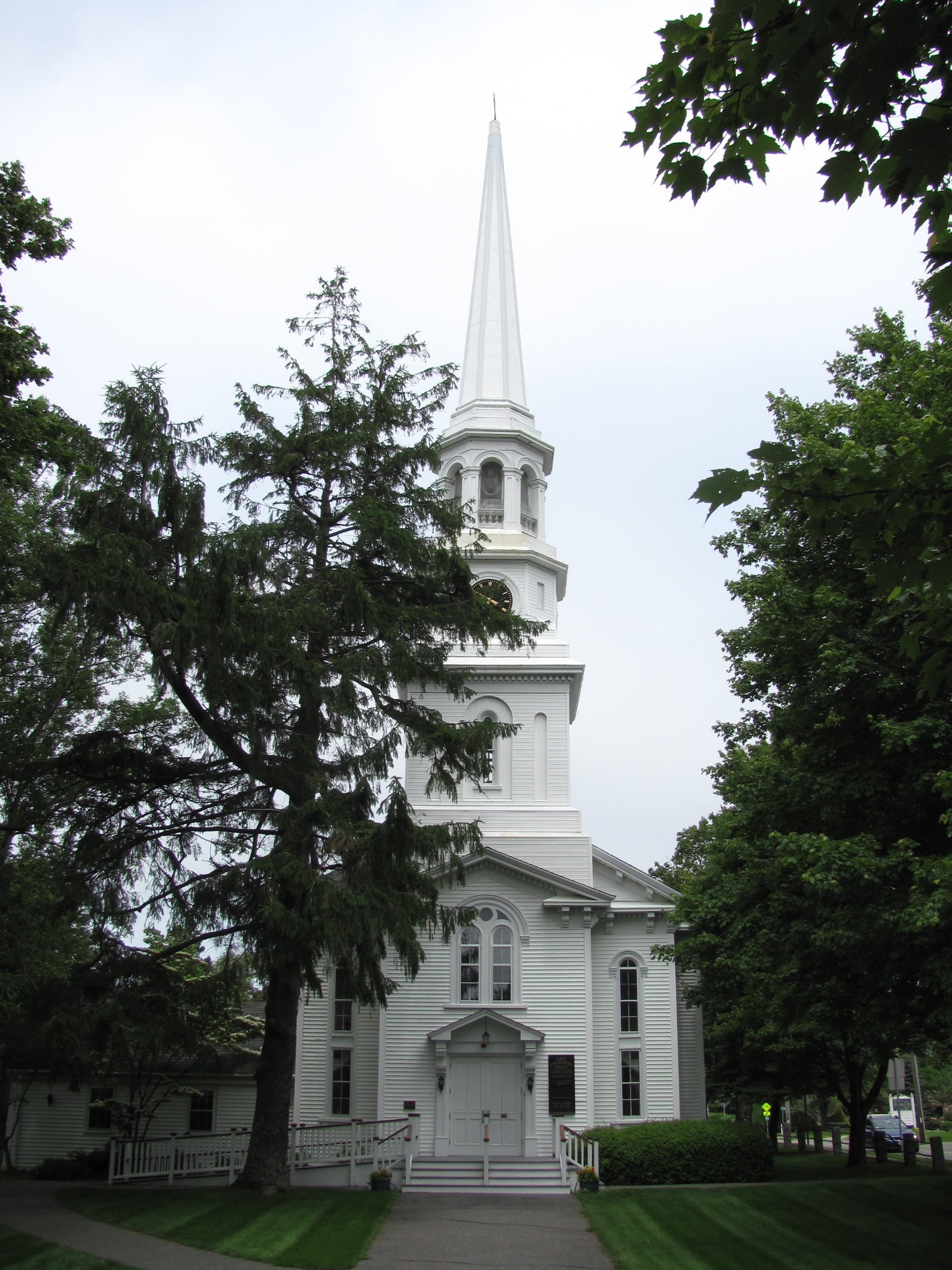
First Congregational Church, Harwich, 1854.

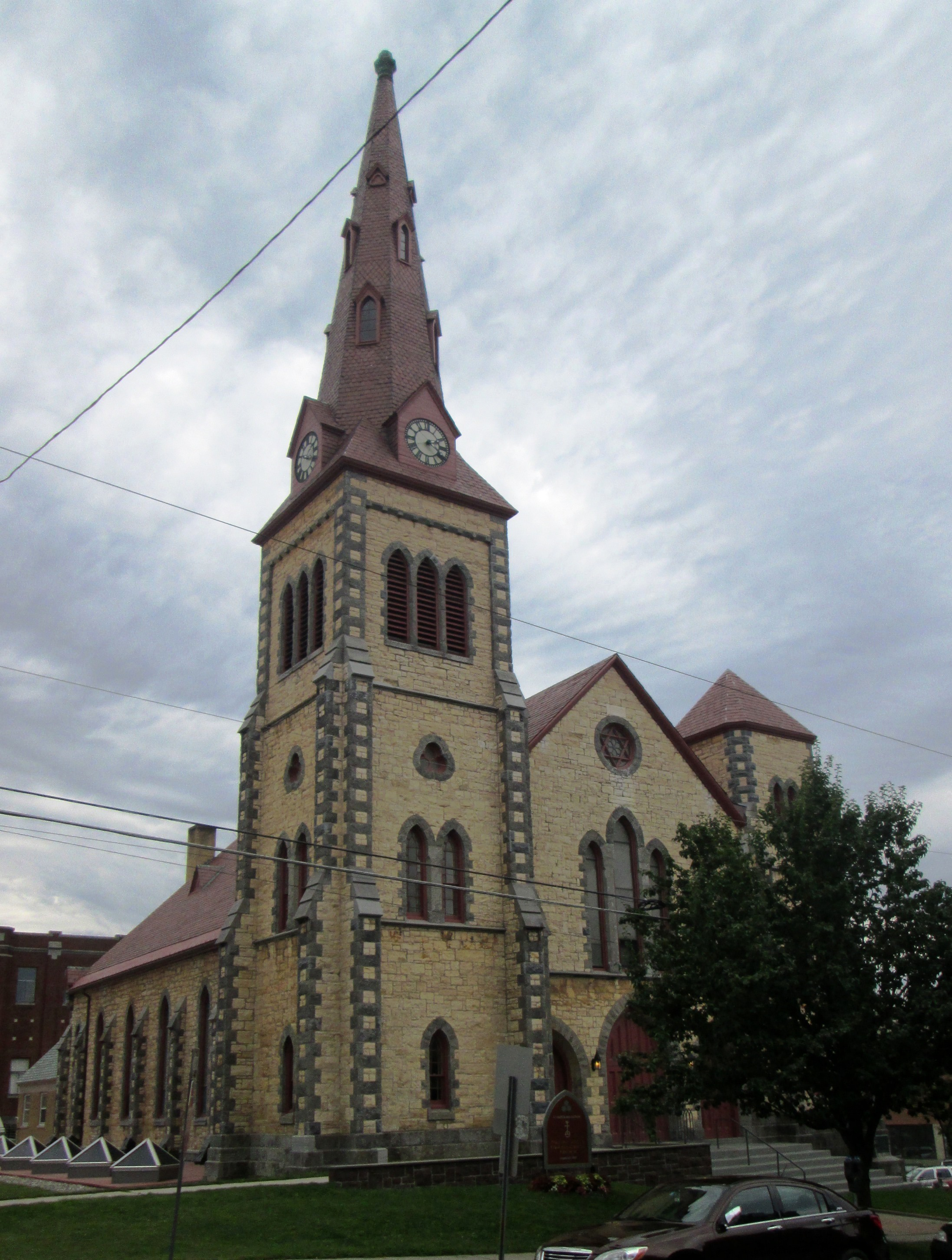
College Street Congregational Church, Burlington, 1863.

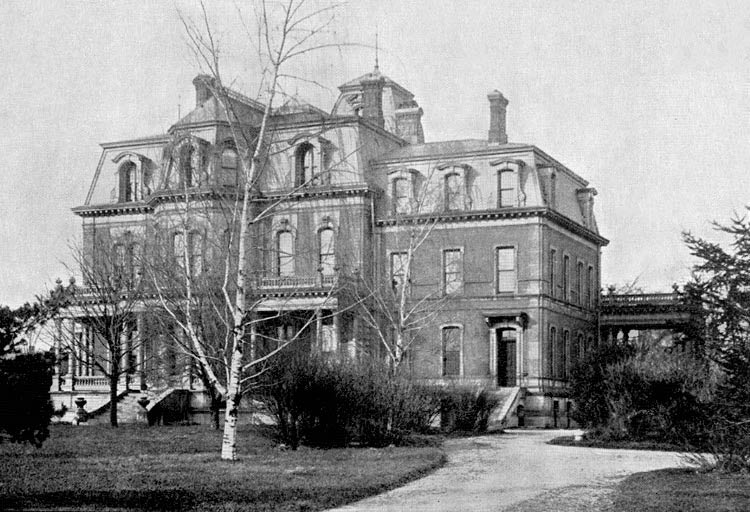
William G. Fargo House, Buffalo, 1868.

John D. Towle (1804–1887) was an American architect.

== Life ==
Towle's early life and training are unknown, but he was a native of Newtonville, Massachusetts. He was in Albany, New York by 1837, when he advertised the opening of an architectural office in partnership with John Klein. By the following year he was in practice alone and provided designs for eight public schools in the City of Albany. His son, James Augustus Towle, was born in Albany in 1839. He was married to Cordelia Shields of Brownville, New York. In 1839–40 he was in partnership with builder James A. Morse; the firm undertook alterations to the New York State Capitol and did work for the Lutheran Ebenezer church, both in the City of Albany. In September 1841 he was a delegate at the state convention of mechanics, representing Albany. In 1843 he opened an architectural office in Boston, Massachusetts.

For most of his life he made his home in Newton. In 1849 he partnered with Albert F. Bellows, an artist who had trained as an architect. The firm of Towle & Bellows dissolved in 1850, when Bellows turned back to painting. He remained in practice without a partner until 1852 when Francis Foster, a surveyor, joined Towle. The firm of Towle & Foster was Towle's most productive partnership. In 1855 the two split, and Towle returned to solo practice. In about 1867 Towle had taken his son, J. Edward Towle, into the firm of J. D. Towle & Son. After 1871 he once again practiced alone. In the late 1870s he relocated to Kansas City, Missouri, where he died in 1887. Towle was a member of the Missouri (now Kansas City) chapter of the American Institute of Architects.

He became noted during the 1850s for his designs of Italianate-style churches, which he built all across New England.

== Legacy ==
Architects Alfred Stone and Samuel J. F. Thayer trained in Towle's office.

== Works ==
=== Towle & Klein, 1837 ===
- No works by this firm, which advertised in Albany, New York for one year, have been identified.

=== J. D. Towle, 1838 ===
- 1838 - Eight public schools in the City of Albany, New York.
  - All except one have been demolished. School 7, altered, remains at 56 Sheridan Avenue.

=== Towle & Morse, 1839–40 ===
- 1839–40 - Alterations to the New York State Capitol, Albany, New York.
  - Demolished in 1883
- 1839 - Unidentified work for the Lutheran Ebenezer Church, Albany, New York.
- 1840 - Engine #11, Albany, New York.

=== J. D. Towle, 1843–1852 ===
- 1851 - Winnisimmet (First) Congregational Church, 163 Chestnut St, Chelsea, Massachusetts
  - Demolished.

=== Towle & Foster, 1852–1855 ===
- 1852 - Central Congregational Church, 183 French St, Bangor, Maine
  - Demolished in 1902.
- 1852 - North Church, 2 Congress St, Portsmouth, New Hampshire
- 1852 - Shawmut Congregational Church, 397 Shawmut Ave, Boston, Massachusetts
  - Demolished. Towle designed houses for the church on each side of the building, and 401 Shawmut still stands.
- 1853 - Bangor Unitarian Church, 126 Union St, Bangor, Maine
- 1853 - Winthrop Street Fire Station, 34 Winthrop St, Charlestown, Massachusetts
  - Altered beyond recognition.
- 1854 - First Congregational Church (Remodeling), 697 Main St, Harwich, Massachusetts
- 1854 - Hammond Street Congregational Church, 28 High St, Bangor, Maine
- 1854 - South Congregational Church, 1101 Main St, Campello, Massachusetts
  - Demolished.
- 1855 - Thompson Congregational Church, 347 Thompson Rd, Thompson, Connecticut

=== J. D. Towle, 1855–1867 ===
- 1856 - Caledonia County Courthouse, 1126 Main St, St. Johnsbury, Vermont
- 1859 - Myron P. Bush House, 762 Delaware Ave, Buffalo, New York
  - Demolished in 1903.
- 1859 - Newton High School, Walnut St & Elm Rd, Newtonville, Massachusetts
  - Remodeled in 1875 by George F. Meacham, demolished in 1896.
- 1863 - College Street Congregational Church, 265 College St, Burlington, Vermont

=== J. D. Towle & Son, 1867–1871 ===
- 1868 - William G. Fargo House, Fargo Ave & Jersey St, Buffalo, New York
  - Demolished in 1900.
- Unknown - George Howard House, 800 Delaware Ave, Buffalo, New York
  - Demolished in 1916.
