= Samuel J. F. Thayer =

American architect

- Born: August 15, 1842; Boston, Massachusetts, U.S.
- Died: February 28, 1893 (aged 50); Boston, Massachusetts, U.S.
- Occupation: Architect
- Practice: Ropes & Thayer; Martin & Thayer; S. J. F. Thayer
- Buildings: Nevins Memorial Library; Providence City Hall; Wilson Hall, Dartmouth College

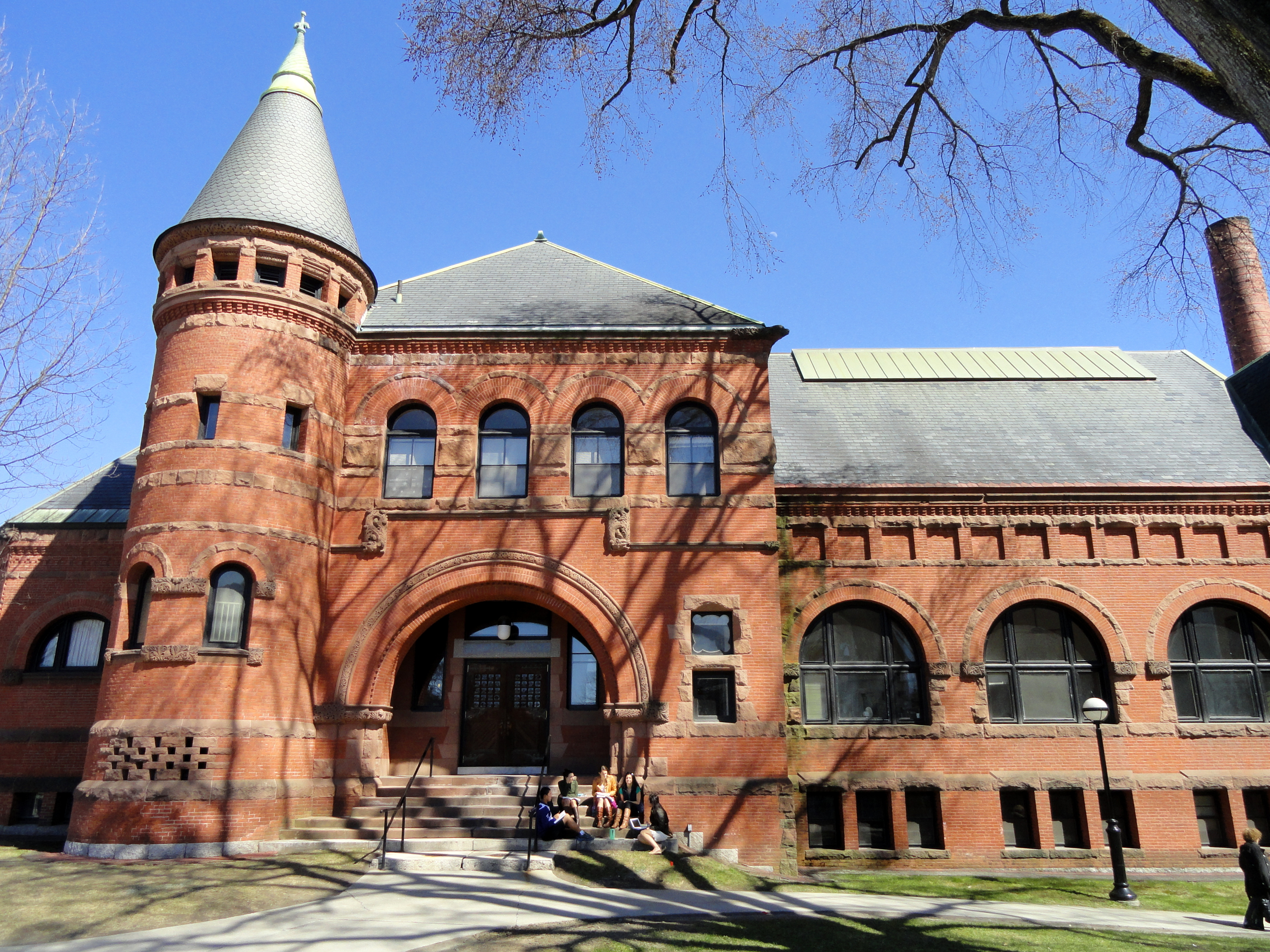
Wilson Hall at Dartmouth College

Samuel J.F. Thayer (August 15, 1842 – February 28, 1893) was an American architect, notable for designing buildings such as the Providence City Hall and the Cathedral of St. George, as well as the town halls of Brookline, Stoughton, and Methuen, Massachusetts. He was part of the architecture firms, Martin & Thayer and Ropes & Thayer.

Thayer served in the American Civil War as a member of the 5th Regiment Massachusetts Volunteers. He committed suicide in 1893 by shooting himself, due to suffering from poor health and money problems.

== Biography ==
Thayer studied under John D. Towle. He lived for a time in South Boston, Massachusetts, and enlisted in the 5th Regiment Massachusetts Volunteers during the American Civil War, serving from October 1862 to July 1863.

After the war, Thayer collaborated briefly with Boston architect Abel C. Martin, forming the firm Martin & Thayer. This firm designed the Centenary Methodist Church in Stanstead, Quebec, a Gothic Revival structure, in 1866–1869. In 1867 they designed a large summer hotel on Lake Memphremagog, Quebec near the American border.

By 1869 the partnership with Martin had ended, and both opened separate offices. In 1875, African American William Augustus Hazel worked as a draftsman for Thayer, Hazel went on to later be a prominent architect in his own right. Thayer then designed the Town Hall of Brookline, Massachusetts, Providence City Hall in 1878, and the Dartmouth College library in 1885.

== Suicide ==
Thayer shot himself in a fit of despondency, dying on February 28, 1893. He had been "in ill health for some time," and reportedly had money troubles. He left behind a suicide note, along with a wife and son.

== Notable works ==
Year	Project	Address	City	State	Notes	Image	Reference
1864	Broadway Orthodox Congregational Church	404 Broadway	Somerville	Massachusetts	Burned in 1866. The church was rebuilt in 1871, which building now forms part of the Broadway Winter Hill Congregational Church.		
1864	Emmanuel Episcopal Church	147 Summer St	Somerville	Massachusetts	Demolished.		
1865	House for Samuel J. F. Thayer	170 Dorchester St	South Boston, Boston	Massachusetts	Designed by Thayer has his own residence. A contributing property to the Dorchester Heights Historic District, listed on the National Register of Historic Places in 2001.		
1869	Centenary Methodist Church	430 W Broadway	South Boston, Boston	Massachusetts	Demolished.		
1870	Arlington House	125 Causeway St	Boston	Massachusetts			
1870	Brookline Town Hall	333 Washington St	Brookline	Massachusetts	Demolished.		
1870	Charlestown High School (former)	30 Monument Sq	Charlestown, Boston	Massachusetts	Demolished.		
1870	Damon School	Readville St	Hyde Park, Boston	Massachusetts	Demolished.		
1870	Morse School	Summer and Craigie Sts	Somerville	Massachusetts	Demolished.		
1870	New Church of Yarmouth	266 Main St	Yarmouth Port	Massachusetts			
1870	Trinity Methodist Church	Main and Chandler Sts	Worcester	Massachusetts	Demolished.		
1871	Fairmount School (former)	85 Williams Ave	Hyde Park, Boston	Massachusetts	Demolished.		
1871	Henry Grew School (former)	40 Gordon Ave	Hyde Park, Boston	Massachusetts	Demolished.		
1871	Somerville High School (former)	81 Highland Ave	Somerville	Massachusetts	Demolished.		
1871	Windsor Avenue Congregational Church (former)	2030 Main St	Hartford	Connecticut	Presently the Faith Congregational Church. Listed on the National Register of Historic Places in 1993.		
1872	Chapel for the First Congregational Church of Canandaigua	58 N Main St	Canandaigua	New York	Built as an annex to the original 1812 church. A contributing property to the North Main Street Historic District, listed on the National Register of Historic Places in 1973.		
1872	Harvard School (former)	20 Devens St	Charlestown, Boston	Massachusetts			
1872	Second Hawes Congregational Church, Unitarian (former)	523 E Broadway	South Boston, Boston	Massachusetts	Presently the St. George Albanian Orthodox Cathedral. The church anchors the Cathedral of St. George Historic District, listed on the National Register of Historic Places in 1998.		
1872	Springfield High School (former)	State St	Springfield	Massachusetts	Later the State Street Grammar School. Demolished.		
1872	State Street Methodist Church	319 State St	Springfield	Massachusetts	Demolished.		
1872	Winchester Home for Aged Women	10 Eden St	Charlestown, Boston	Massachusetts	Demolished.		
1873	Mercantile building for George T. Bigelow	77 Bedford St	Boston	Massachusetts	Built by Bigelow in his role as trustee of the Miller estate. Destroyed by fire in 1879, and rebuilt in 1880 by Anna Smith (Miller) Bigelow, again to a design by Thayer.		
1873	Nashua High School (former)	30 Spring St	Nashua	New Hampshire	Later the Spring Street School. Demolished.		
1874	Engine House No. 25	High St and Fort Hill Sq	Boston	Massachusetts	Demolished.		
1875	Providence City Hall	25 Dorrance St	Providence	Rhode Island	Listed on the National Register of Historic Places in 1975.		
1876	House for J. Warren Merrill	6 Smiths Point Rd	Manchester	Massachusetts	Demolished.		
1877	Atlantic House	37 Oceanside Dr	Hull	Massachusetts	Burned in 1927.		
1880	House for Mary F. Mallon	Mount Bowdoin Green	Dorchester, Boston	Massachusetts	Demolished.		
1880	Jordan, Marsh & Company Department Store	450 Washington St	Boston	Massachusetts	Demolished.		
1880	Stoughton Town Hall	10 Pearl St	Stoughton	Massachusetts			
1881	House for Edward H. Gilman	Elm St	Exeter	New Hampshire	Moved from Court Street in 1924 to serve as faculty housing for the Phillips Exeter Academy. Now known as Cushwa House.		
1881	House for Daniel H. Lane	291 Beacon St	Boston	Massachusetts	A contributing property to the Back Bay Historic District, listed on the National Register of Historic Places in 1973.		
1881	House for John G. Phinney	81 Summer St	Stoughton	Massachusetts			
1881	House for Nathaniel L. Ripley	618 Centre St	Newton	Massachusetts			
1881	Jordan Building	77 Bedford St	Boston	Massachusetts	Destroyed in the "Thanksgiving Day Fire" in 1889.		
1881	Lyceum Hall	206 Main St	Yarmouth Port	Massachusetts	Altered.		
1881	Nevins Building	78 Chauncy St	Boston	Massachusetts	Gutted in the "Thanksgiving Day Fire" in 1889. In 1890 the granite facades were reused for a new Nevins Building on site, also designed by Thayer.		
1882	Farragut Hotel	Ocean Blvd	Rye	New Hampshire	Demolished in 1975.		
1882	House for Isaac P. T. Edmands	28 Atlantic Ave	Swampscott	Massachusetts	Demolished.		
1883	Nevins Memorial Hall and Library	305 Broadway	Methuen	Massachusetts	Listed on the National Register of Historic Places in 1984.		
1884	Wilson Hall, Dartmouth College		Hanover	New Hampshire	Built as the college library, and more recently part of the Hood Museum of Art.		
1885	The Tudor	34 1/2 Beacon St	Boston	Massachusetts			
1885	Remodeling of the Quincy House	Brattle St and Brattle Sq	Boston	Massachusetts	In addition to an interior remodeling, Thayer added several floors and a turret to the existing structure, as well as a new wing along Brattle Square. Demolished in 1935.		
1885	Wauban Building	184 Boylston St	Boston	Massachusetts	Demolished.		
1886	Chadwick Building	7 Tremont St	Boston	Massachusetts	Demolished.		
1886	Potter Building	202-212 Boylston St	Boston	Massachusetts	Demolished.		
1886	The Thorndike	240 Boylston St	Boston	Massachusetts	Demolished.		
1887	Boston Tavern	14-16 Province Ct	Boston	Massachusetts	Demolished.		
1887	House for John D. Long	107 Washington Ave	Cambridge	Massachusetts			
1891	Remodeling of the Norwood Hotel	37 Bridge St	Northampton	Massachusetts	Mostly demolished, but a fragment was moved to 11 Bridge Street, which is a contributing property to the Pomeroy Terrace Historic District, listed on the National Register of Historic Places in 2018.		
