= Cathedral of St. George Historic District =

Historic district in Massachusetts, United States

- U.S. National Register of Historic Places
- U.S. Historic district
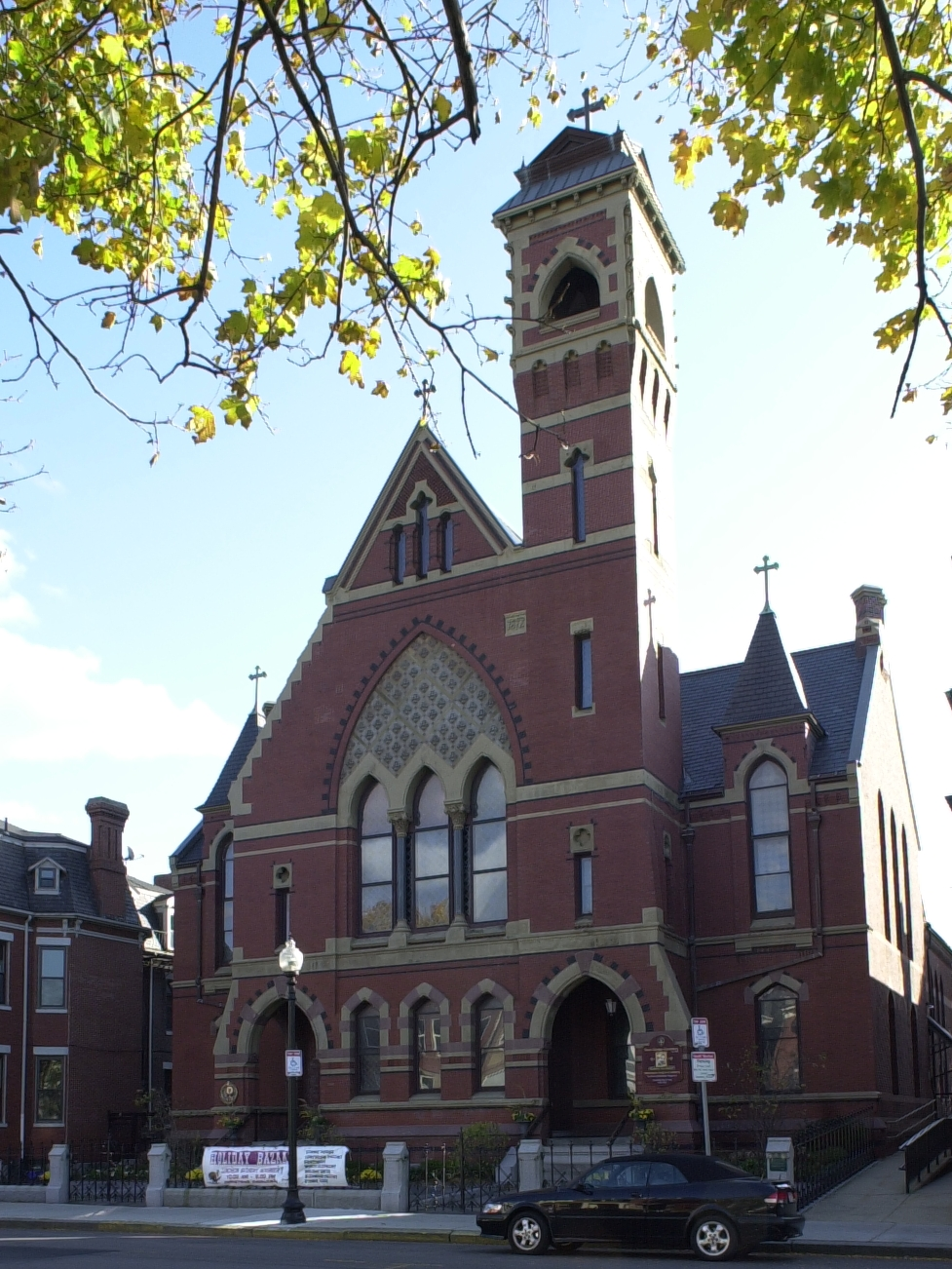

- Location within Massachusetts Location within the United States
- Location: 517-523-525 E. Broadway, Boston, Massachusetts
- Coordinates: 42°20′7.1″N 71°2′36.8″W
- Area: less than one acre
- Built: 1868
- Architect: Samuel J. F. Thayer
- Architectural style: Gothic
- NRHP reference No.: 98001361
- Added to NRHP: November 25, 1998

The Cathedral of St. George Historic District encompasses a historic church complex at 517-523-525 East Broadway in South Boston, Massachusetts. The church building was designed by Boston architect Samuel J. F. Thayer and was built in 1872 to house a Unitarian congregation. The polychrome Gothic Revival structure was acquired in 1949 by the Albanian Orthodox Archdiocese of the Orthodox Church in America. The complex also includes two brick houses, 517 and 525 East Broadway, which were built about the same time as the church, and were owned by the Unitarian congregation.

The complex was listed on the National Register of Historic Places in 1998.

== See also ==
- Saint George: Devotions, traditions and prayers
- National Register of Historic Places listings in southern Boston, Massachusetts
