= Fourth Congregational Church =

Historic church in Connecticut, United States

- U.S. National Register of Historic Places
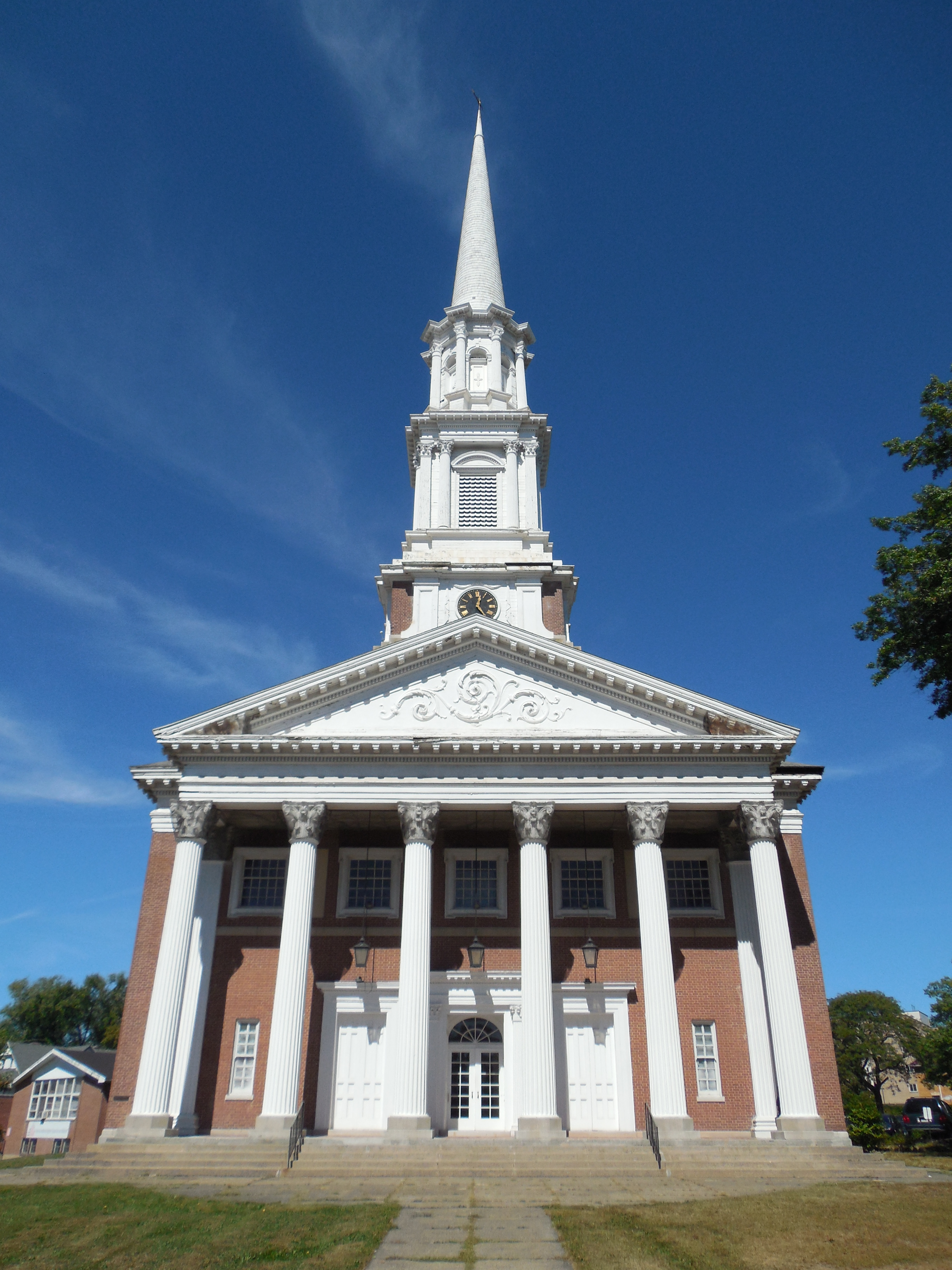
- Fourth Congregational Church

- Location within Connecticut Location within the United States
- Location: Albany Avenue and Vine Street, Hartford, Connecticut
- Coordinates: 41°46′47″N 72°41′23″W
- Area: 1.6 acres (0.65 ha)
- Built: 1913-14
- Architect: Davis & Brooks
- Architectural style: Georgian Revival
- NRHP reference No.: 82004409
- Added to NRHP: April 12, 1982

The Fourth Congregational Church, also known historically as the Horace Bushnell Congregational Church and now as the Liberty Christian Center International, is a historic church at Albany Avenue and Vine Street in Hartford, Connecticut. The church building was built in 1913-14 using parts of an older Greek Revival church, and was listed on the National Register of Historic Places in 1982 for its architecture and role in local historical preservation efforts.

== Building description and history ==
The Fourth Congregational Church building is located in Hartford's north side Clay-Arsenal neighborhood, at the northwest corner of Vine Street and Albany Avenue (United States Route 44). It is a single-story brick building, with a gabled roof trimmed in wood, and a concrete foundation. It is set at an angle and on a rise on its lot, giving it visual prominence over the local streetscape. The main facade consists of a monumental six-column Corinthian portico, with a full entablature and dentillated full pediment. A multi-stage tower with clock and bell stages rises to an octagonal spire.

The building was designed by Davis & Brooks and built in 1913-14 for a congregation known as The Free Church and later as the Fourth Congregational Church, established in 1832. This church building notably reused the doors, steeple, and portico of the congregation's old church, an 1850 building designed by New Haven architect Sidney Mason Stone. The Bushnell congregation was formed in 1954 by the merger of the Fourth Congregational with the congregation of the Windsor Avenue Congregational Church building on Main Street.

== See also ==
- National Register of Historic Places listings in Hartford, Connecticut
