= North Church (Portsmouth, New Hampshire) =

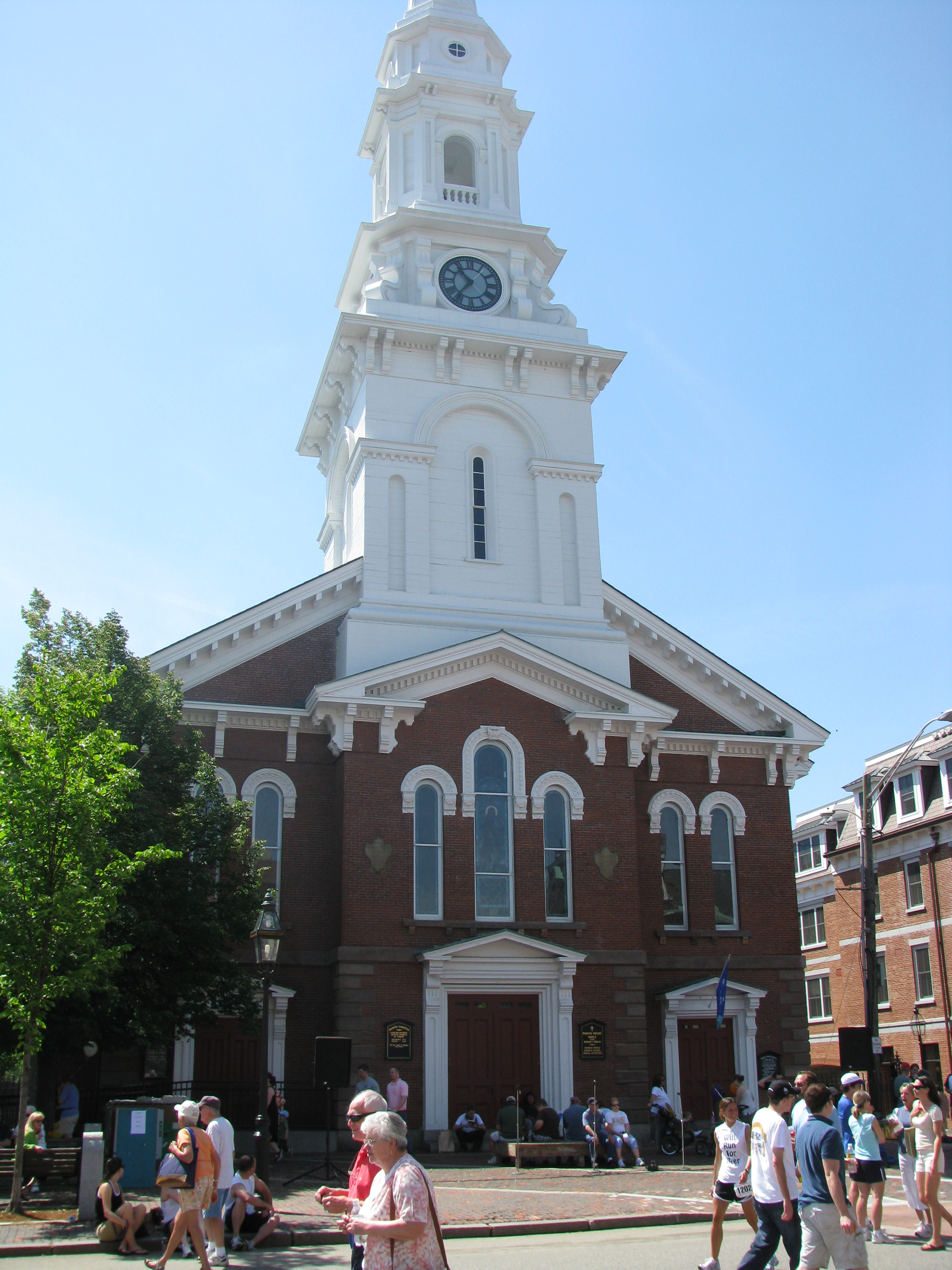
- Front Entrance of North Church

- Location within New Hampshire
- 43°04′36″N 70°45′28″W
- Location: Portsmouth, New Hampshire

History
- Built: 1657
- Rebuilt: 1854

Site notes
- Restored: 1978

The North Church of Portsmouth, New Hampshire, United States, is a historic Congregational church located in Market Square. Sited directly across from the Portsmouth Athenæum, it features an Italianate edifice and a steeple visible from most of the city, the Piscataqua River, and communities on its western bank in Maine. Its spire has been referred to as Portsmouth's "landmark of record". The church is home to Portsmouth's United Church of Christ congregation.

== History ==
The first church built in Portsmouth was constructed in 1657 near a milldam. Another church building was built on a corner of the same 50-acre (0.20 km^{2}) glebe at the corner of Congress Street and Pleasant Street roughly fifty years later. A large clock and bell were added in 1749. The church kept extensive records of baptisms, marriages, and funerals of members. Prominent members included John Cutt, William Whipple, John Langdon, and Daniel Webster. Samuel Langdon was a pastor here from 1747 to 1774, prior to becoming President of Harvard University. George Washington attended a service during his visit to New Hampshire in 1789.

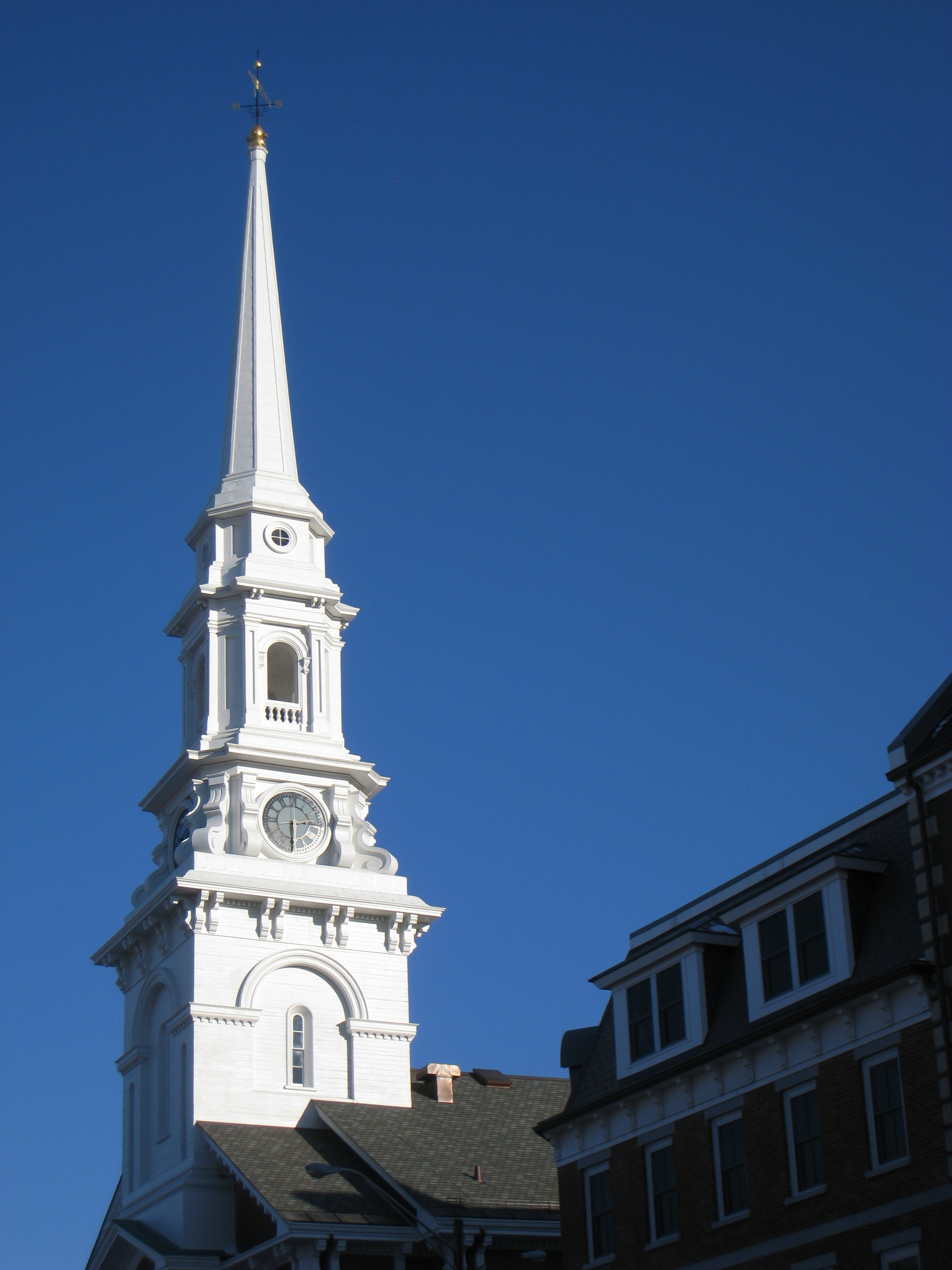
Steeple of North Church

Members of the church were required to purchase pews. Slave owners had to purchase extra pews for their slaves, which were on the top corner of the balcony. A majority of the black people in Portsmouth attended North Church, which appointed an overseer to ensure that they paid proper attention during the sermon. The church often paid indigent members of the community small sums of money to do menial tasks.

The second church was replaced by a new building in 1835, although the same clock, bell, and furnishings were used. The church was a three-story wooden building that featured two tiers of balconies. The pulpit and the main entrance were located at different sides of the building. It had a 150-foot (46 m) steeple.

In 1854 the church building was demolished and a new building by Towle & Foster of Boston was erected at a cost of $30,000. In 1856 a more modern clock was installed. The congregation planned to have the bell recast in England, but it was lost in a shipwreck. A new organ was added in 1890. A bell on the church was used to signal the community's 9 P.M. curfew from the 1700s into the 1900s.

=== Recent developments ===
The church was renovated in 1978, as part of efforts to enhance the beauty of Market Square. In 2005 a vandal struck the church and caused $26,000 worth of damage. The case remained unsolved for four years until blood used to write a message at the scene was matched to a man from Maine. In May 2006 the building's roof and steeple underwent a major renovation and a new spire was installed. Two months later the new spire was damaged by strong winds during a thunderstorm. In addition to hosting the services of the North Church congregation, the building is also rented out for concerts and worship services held by congregations that lack their own building.

== Theology ==
North Church has always been a Congregational church, and encountered persecution after Charles II of England passed the Act of Uniformity in 1662. On December 10, 1683, Governor Edward Cranfield proclaimed that all ministers should use Church of England rites and that he himself would seek the Lord's Supper on January 22, 1684. Reverend Joshua Moody, the Puritan minister who had been sermonizing against the governor, refused on theologic grounds so the governor threw him in the prison in New Castle.

By the early 19th century, North Church was considered to be much more conservative than the other large Congregational church in Portsmouth, which had become Unitarian. In the 1840s, the minister of North Church, Edwin Holt, began vocally espousing abolitionism. This position upset many members of the church, and the uproar led to Holt leaving the church.

North Church is now a member of the United Church of Christ denomination.

== Bibliography ==
- Cunningham, Valérie; Sammons, Mark (2004), Black Portsmouth: three centuries of African-American heritage, Lebanon: University of New Hampshire Press, p. 280, ISBN 978-1-58465-289-2
- Gurney, Caleb Stevens (1902), Portsmouth, historic and picturesque: a volume of information, Portland: Lakeside Press, p. 261
- Wallington, Nellie Urner (1907), Historic churches of America, New York: Duffield, p. 261
