= Windsor Avenue Congregational Church =

Historic church in Connecticut, United States

- Faith Congregational Church, U.C.C. (formerly Windsor Avenue Congregational Church)
- U.S. National Register of Historic Places
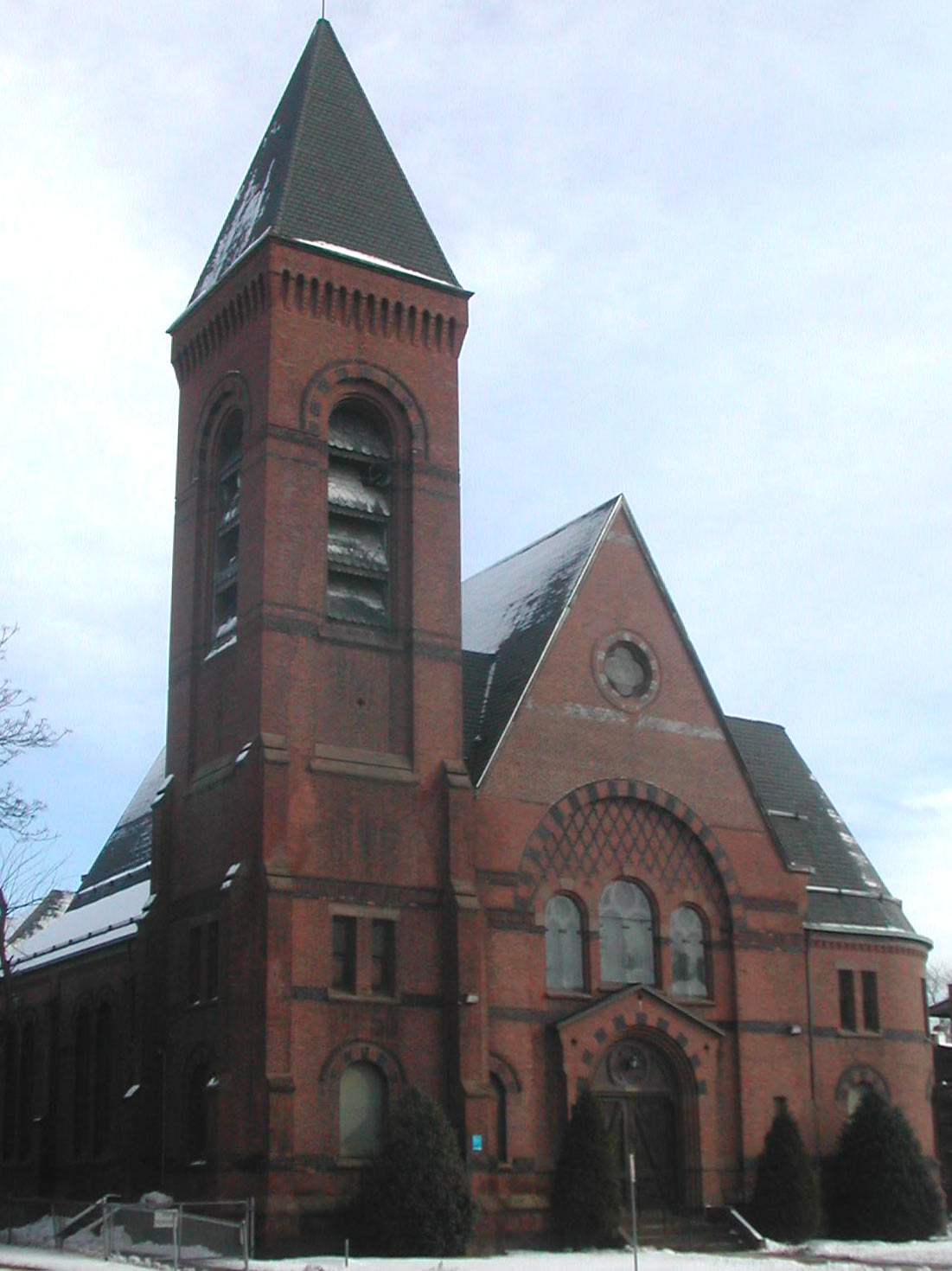
- Faith (formerly Windsor Avenue) Congregational Church

- Location within Connecticut Location within the United States
- Location: 2030 Main Street, Hartford, Connecticut
- Coordinates: 41°46′56″N 72°40′33″W
- Area: 0.6 acres (0.24 ha)
- Built: 1871
- Architect: Samuel J. F. Thayer (1871); Isaac A. Allen Jr. (1904)
- Architectural style: Romanesque
- NRHP reference No.: 93000174
- Added to NRHP: April 03, 1993

Faith Congregational Church (housed in what was formerly Windsor Avenue Congregational Church) is a historic church at 2030 Main Street in Hartford, Connecticut. The brick Romanesque Revival-style church building, completed in 1872, now houses Faith Congregational Church, whose lineage includes the city's oldest African-American congregation, established in 1819. The church is a stop on the Connecticut Freedom Trail and was listed on the United States National Register of Historic Places in 1993.

== Architecture and building history ==
Faith Congregational Church is located in Hartford's Clay-Arsenal neighborhood, on the east side of Main Street midway between Pavilion and Battles Streets. It is a two-story masonry structure, built out of red brick with black brick trim in a roughly cruciform plan. It has a long main gable, with a projecting apse-like bay on one side and a gabled bay on the other. At the left corner between the main roof and bay a buttressed square tower rises to a steeple and spire. The main facade is dominated by the gable end and entrance, which is set under a gabled projection in a slightly recessed two-story round-arch panel. Above the doorway are three round-arch windows.

The building was designed by Boston architect Samuel J. F. Thayer and built in 1871–72. The Windsor Avenue Congregation (named for what North Main Street was originally called) grew out of a Sunday school that was organized in 1864 at Wooster and Pavilion Streets. The Windsor Avenue congregation was formally founded in 1869, and its first minister settled in 1871. That congregation also built the adjacent parish house in 1904 to a design by Isaac A. Allen Jr. In 1904 it merged with another congregation to form the Horace Bushnell Congregational Church, which meets in the former Fourth Congregational Church building at Albany and Vine Streets.

This building was then sold to what would soon be known as Faith Congregational Church. Its congregation was formed in 1953 by a merger between the Talcott Street Congregational Church and Mother Bethel Methodist Church. The Talcott Street congregation, founded in 1819, is the oldest African-American congregation in the city.

== See also ==
- National Register of Historic Places listings in Hartford, Connecticut
