= Noah Webster Memorial Library (1917 building) =

- U.S. National Register of Historic Places
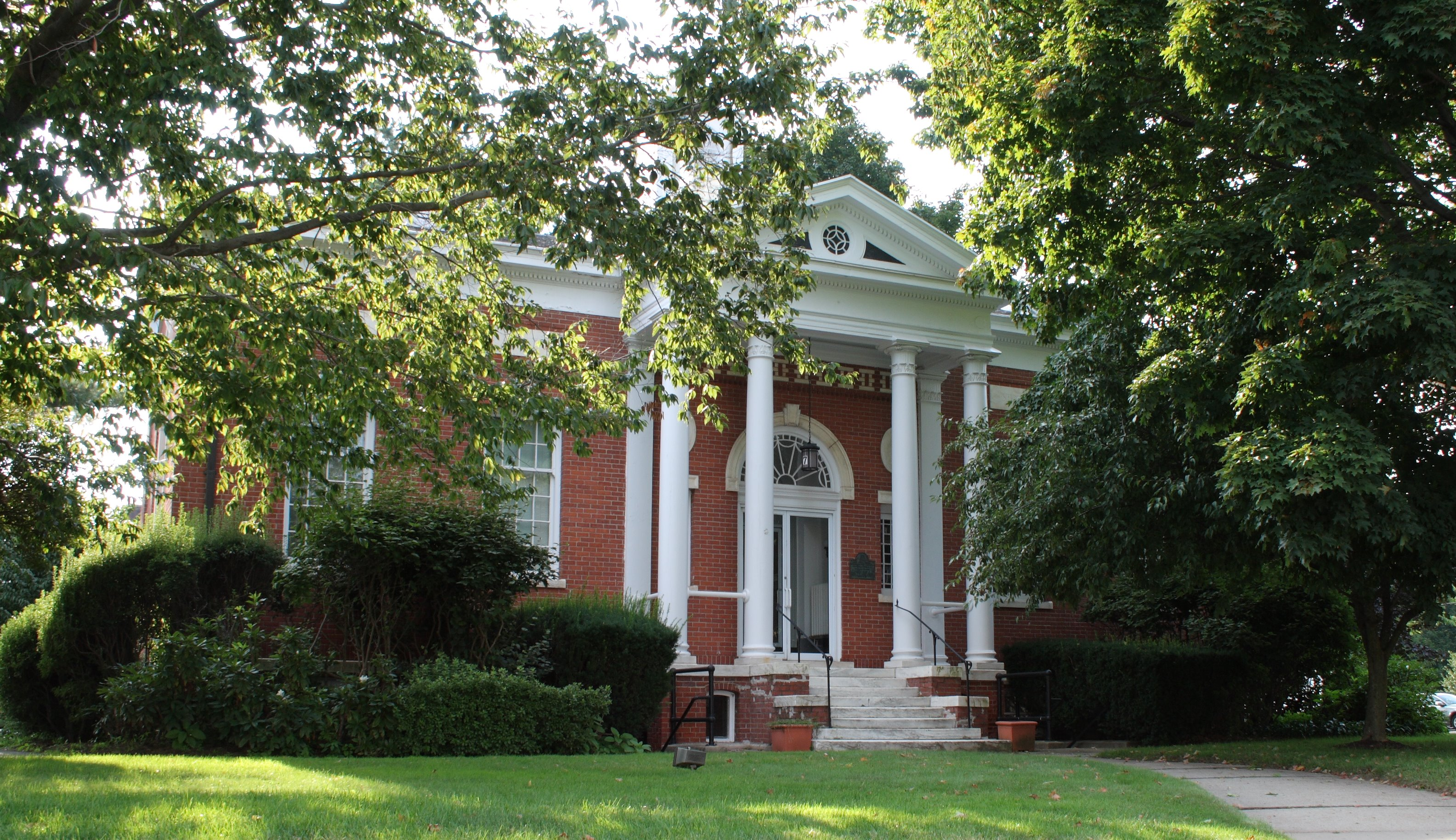

- Location within Connecticut Location within the United States
- Location: 7 North Main Street, West Hartford, Connecticut
- Coordinates: 41°45′41″N 72°43′7″W
- Area: less than one acre
- Built: 1915-1917
- Architect: Davis & Brooks
- Architectural style: Colonial Revival, Georgian Revival
- NRHP reference No.: 81000534
- Added to NRHP: July 30, 1981

The 1917 Noah Webster Memorial Library building is a historic library building at 7 North Main Street in West Hartford, Connecticut. Built to a design by the Hartford firm Davis & Brooks, it is a prominent local example of Colonial Revival architecture. It housed the town library (founded in 1897) between 1917 and 1937, and later served as a YMCA/YWCA hall and a senior center. It was listed on the National Register of Historic Places in 1981. It is now used as a commercial space.

== Description and history ==
The former Noah Webster Memorial Library building stands at the southwest corner of North Main and Brace Streets, a short way north of the cluster of West Hartford's main civic buildings. It is a two-story masonry structure, built out of red brick with marble and wooden trim. Its front facade, facing North Main Street, is dominated by a massive four-column Classical portico, with wooden columns supporting an entablature and fully pedimented gable with oculus window. Flanking the portico are tall multisash windows, with Palladian windows at the building ends. The entrance consists of two modern doors, above which is a half-round transom window. The interior, despite its later uses, retains a number of original features, including woodwork around the windows and fireplaces.

West Hartford's public library had its origins in a lending library established in the mid-19th century by the local Congregational church, which was opened to the general public in 1883. The town formally took over the collection in 1897, and it continued to be housed in the church. This building was constructed in 1915-17 through the efforts of the local chapter of the Daughters of the American Revolution (DAR). It was designed by the Hartford architectural partnership of F. Irwin Davis and William Brooks, and was formally dedicated in 1917. DAR fundraising efforts fell short during construction, and was finished with funds appropriated by the town. By 1937 the building was judged inadequate for the library's needs, and a new building was erected on South Main Street near the town hall. This building was then adapted for use by local YMCA and YWCA organizations, and then as a senior center.

== See also ==
- National Register of Historic Places listings in West Hartford, Connecticut
