= Hammond Street Congregational Church =

Historic church in Maine, United States

- U.S. National Register of Historic Places
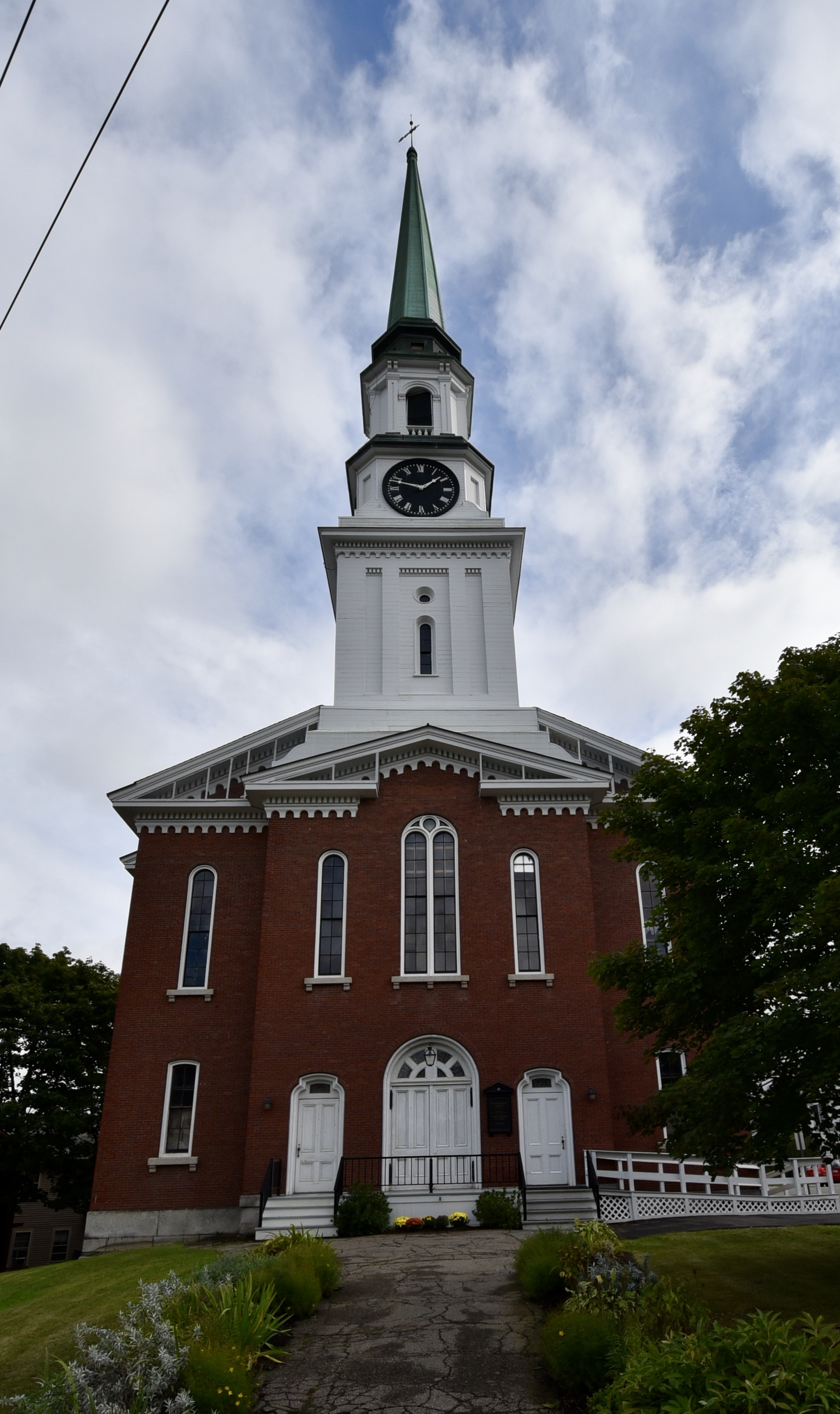

- Location within Maine Location within the United States
- Location: Hammond and High Sts. Bangor, Maine
- Coordinates: 44°48′4″N 68°46′28″W
- Area: 0.3 acres (0.12 ha)
- Built: 1833
- Architect: Towle & Foster
- Architectural style: Italianate
- NRHP reference No.: 82000774
- Added to NRHP: July 08, 1982

The Hammond Street Congregational Church is a historic church on Hammond and High Streets in Bangor, Maine. The church building was built in 1833, and extensively restyled in 1853, resulting in the present handsome Italianate structure. The building was listed on the National Register of Historic Places in 1982. The congregation, established in 1833, is affiliated with the United Church of Christ; its senior pastor is Rev. Gary Bagley.

== Architecture and history ==
The Hammond Street Church is located in central Bangor, on the south side of Hammond Street (United States Route 2 and Maine State Route 100) between High and North High Streets. The building is set facing northwest, its long axis paralleling High Street. It is a two-story brick building, with a projecting pavilion topped by a wooden tower. A three-bay vestibule projects slightly from the pavilion, with narrow doors flanking a larger central one, and a similar configuration of round-arch windows on the second level. The vestibule is capped by a dentillated cornice and a central pediment with long returns. The tower has three stages, the first with narrow round-arch window set in a panelled recess, the second with clock faces and angled paneled corners, and then a narrower octagonal stage with round-arch windows on four sides below the spire.

The congregation was established in 1833, and in the same year contracted the construction of a brick building with Greek Revival features, including a temple portico and two towers. The cost of the structure was prohibitive, and during construction it was decided to lower its height and shorten its body, resulting in a misshapen building with an oversized portico. In 1853, the congregation retained Towle & Foster, a Boston firm known for their church designs, to prepare an Italianate design that corrected the building's deficiencies. The present structure, a result of this work, retains only portions of the previous building.

== See also ==
- National Register of Historic Places listings in Penobscot County, Maine
