= Prospect Avenue Historic District =

Historic district in Connecticut, United States

- U.S. National Register of Historic Places
- U.S. Historic district
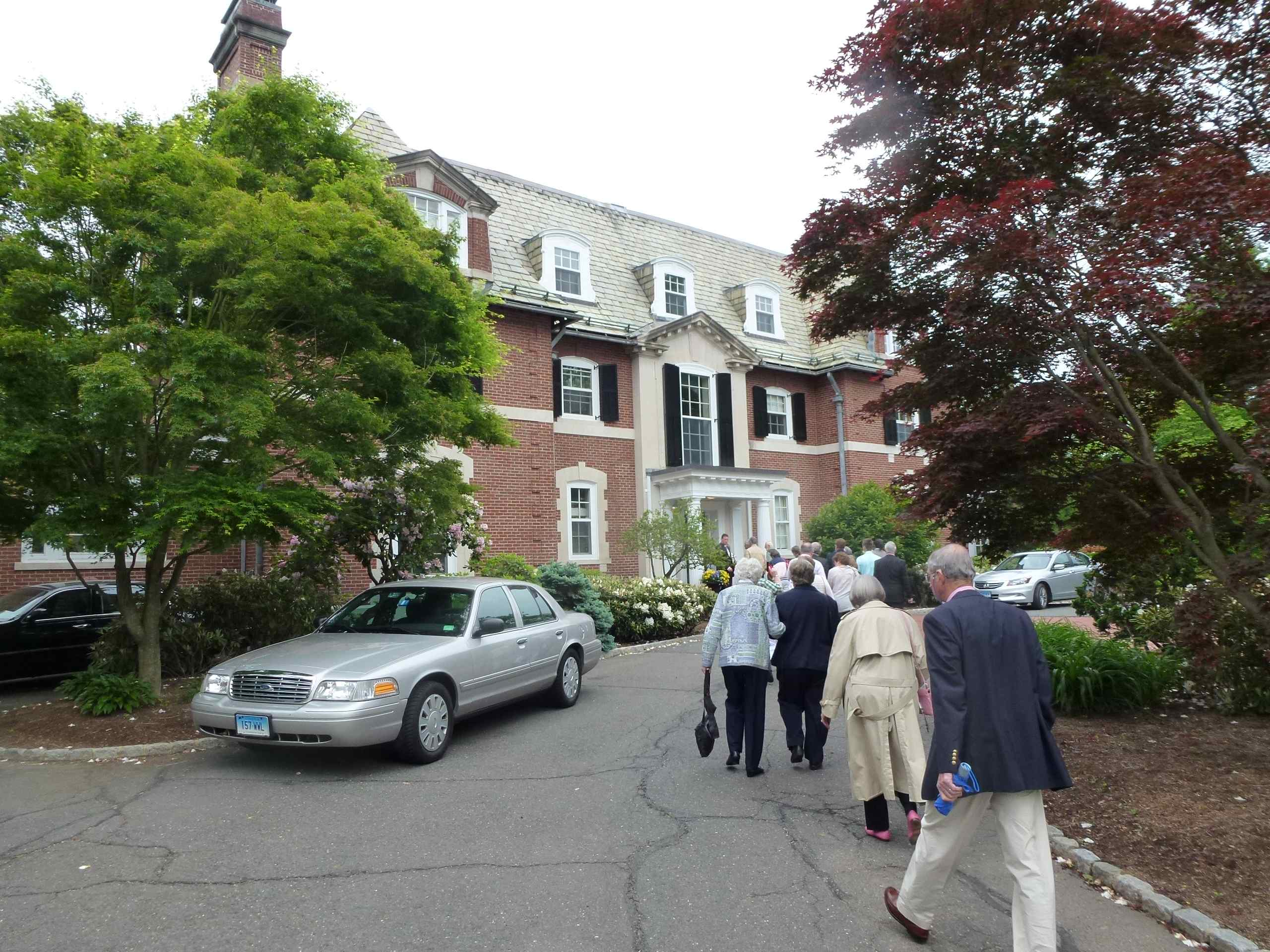
- The Connecticut Governor's Residence

- Location within Connecticut Location within the United States
- Location: Roughly bounded by Albany Avenue, North Branch Park River, Elizabeth & Fern Streets, Prospect & Asylum Avenues & Sycamore Road, Hartford and West Hartford
- Coordinates: 41°46′43″N 72°42′38″W
- Area: 300 acres (120 ha)
- Architect: Multiple
- Architectural style: Late 19th and 20th Century Revivals; French Norman Chateau; Bungalow/Craftsman
- NRHP reference No.: 85001918
- Added to NRHP: August 29, 1985

The Prospect Avenue Historic District encompasses a predominantly residential area in western Hartford and eastern West Hartford, Connecticut. The 300-acre (120 ha) historic district extends along Prospect Avenue from Albany Avenue to Fern Street, including most of the area between those streets and the Park River to the east, and Sycamore Street and Sycamore Lane to the west. The district includes 240 contributing buildings and 48 non-contributing buildings, most of them residences built between 1880 and 1930. The district was listed on the National Register of Historic Places in 1985.

Most of the district was laid out on land that originally belonged to Hartford's prominent Goodwin family, a number of whom built houses on large lots near the Park River, in some cases designed by architects who were also members of the extended family. In the early decades of the 20th century, the area attracted a number of Hartford's elites to also build houses in the same area. There are 87 examples of Georgian Revival architecture and 55 examples of Tudor Revival architecture in the district. A few homes are designed in the French Norman Chateau style, and the Craftsman and Prairie Style are each represented by a single building.

The Connecticut Governor's Residence is included in the district as a contributing building. It is located at 990 Prospect Avenue, and is a Georgian Revival, built in 1908. It was designed by Andrews, Jacques and Rantoul, of Boston, and was altered in 1916 (see photo #7 in accompanying photos).

== See also ==
- National Register of Historic Places listings in West Hartford, Connecticut
- National Register of Historic Places listings in Hartford, Connecticut
