= West End Historic District (New Britain, Connecticut) =

Historic district in Connecticut, United States

- U.S. National Register of Historic Places
- U.S. Historic district
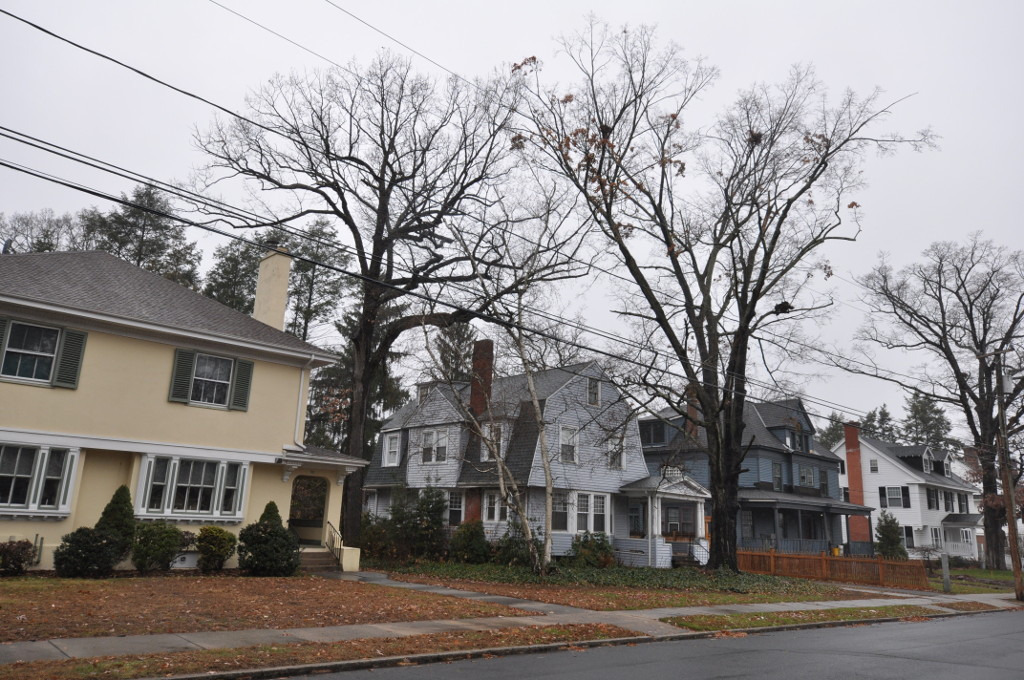
- Vine Street

- Location within Connecticut Location within the United States
- Location: Roughly along Park Place, Vine, Forest, Lincoln, Liberty, Sunnyledge, Hart, Lexington, Murray, and Woodbine Streets, New Britain, Connecticut
- Coordinates: 41°39′40″N 72°47′42″W
- Area: 75 acres (30 ha)
- Built: 1884
- Architect: Davis, Frank I.; et.al.
- Architectural style: Shingle Style, Colonial Revival, Tudor Revival
- NRHP reference No.: 98001542
- Added to NRHP: December 24, 1998

The West End Historic District encompasses a predominantly residential area west of downtown New Britain, Connecticut. Forming a rough C shape around the west part of Walnut Hill Park, the area was developed in the late 19th century as one of its premier upper-class neighborhoods, home to business and civic leaders, with a fine array of late 19th and early 20th century architecture. It was listed on the National Register of Historic Places in 1998.

== Description and history ==
New Britain experienced an economic boom in the years after the American Civil War, driven by innovation and manufacturing of building hardware and similar goods. Walnut Hill Park was laid out in 1870, and the city received landscape design guidance from Frederick Law Olmsted and Calvert Vaux on the layout of the park and the surrounding areas to the northwest, west, and south. Much of this land was owned by Henry Russell, chairman of the park commission, who platted out streets roughly parallel to the park boundaries and sold off lots for residential development between 1884 and 1908. This resulted in the present layout of roads running northeast-to-southwest (Lincoln, Forest, and Vine Streets) and east-west (Hart Street) that form the core of the historic district.

The houses that were built in this area are predominantly in the restrained styles of the early 20th century, including the Colonial Revival, American Foursquare, and Tudor Revival. They are typically set on handsome lots with generous setbacks, on tree-lined streets. The local architectural firm of Davis and Brooks designed a significant number of these houses, including a fine Shingle style house on Vine Street that eventually became the home of architect William Brooks. Many homes were built for executives of the Stanley Works, New Britain's leading hardware manufacturer.

== See also ==
- National Register of Historic Places listings in Hartford County, Connecticut
