= Bishops Corner =

Bishops Corner may refer to:

- Bishops Corner, West Hartford
- Bishops Corner, Delaware
