= Capitol Planning Region, Connecticut =

Capitol Region Council of Governments (CRCOG)
- Planning Region
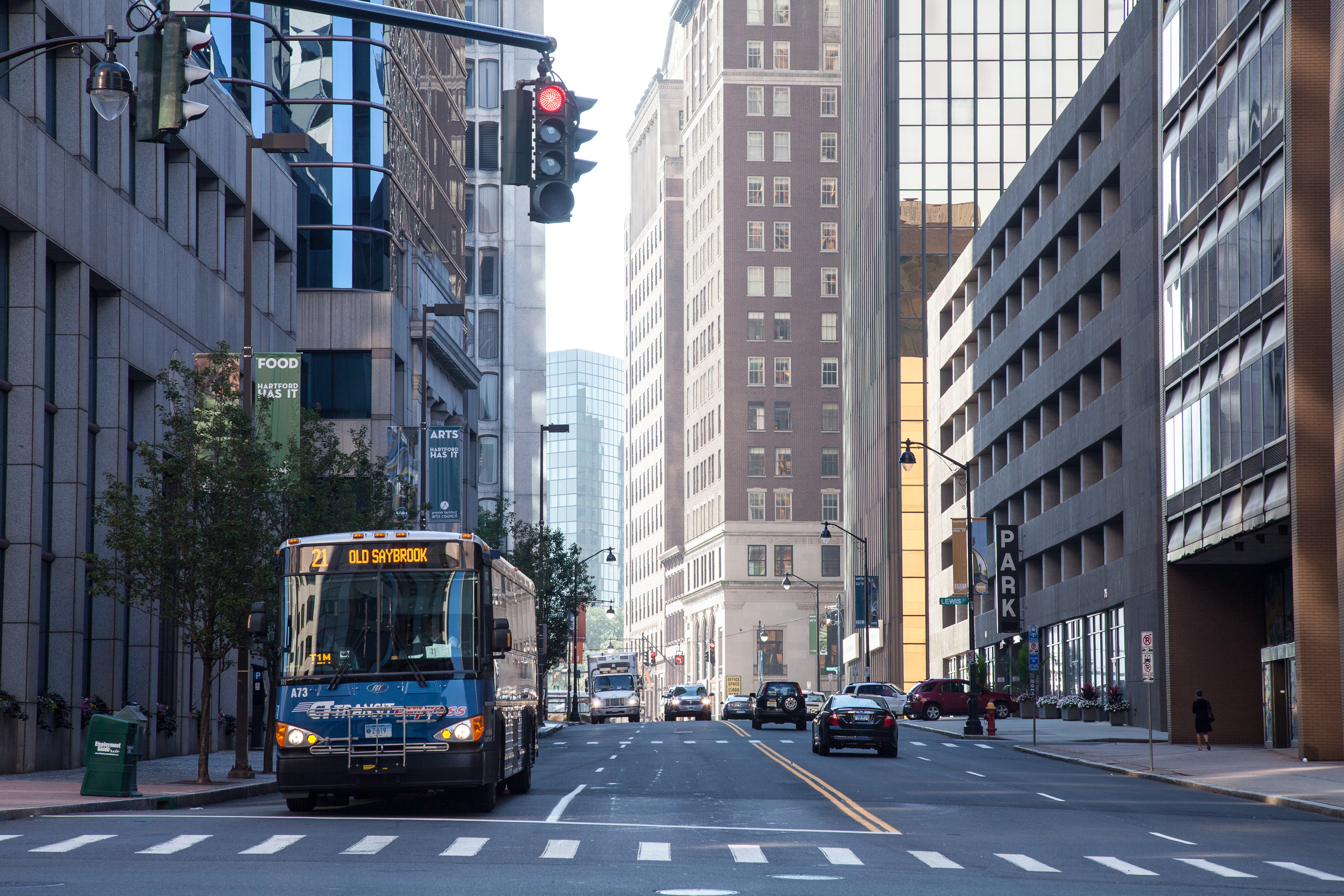
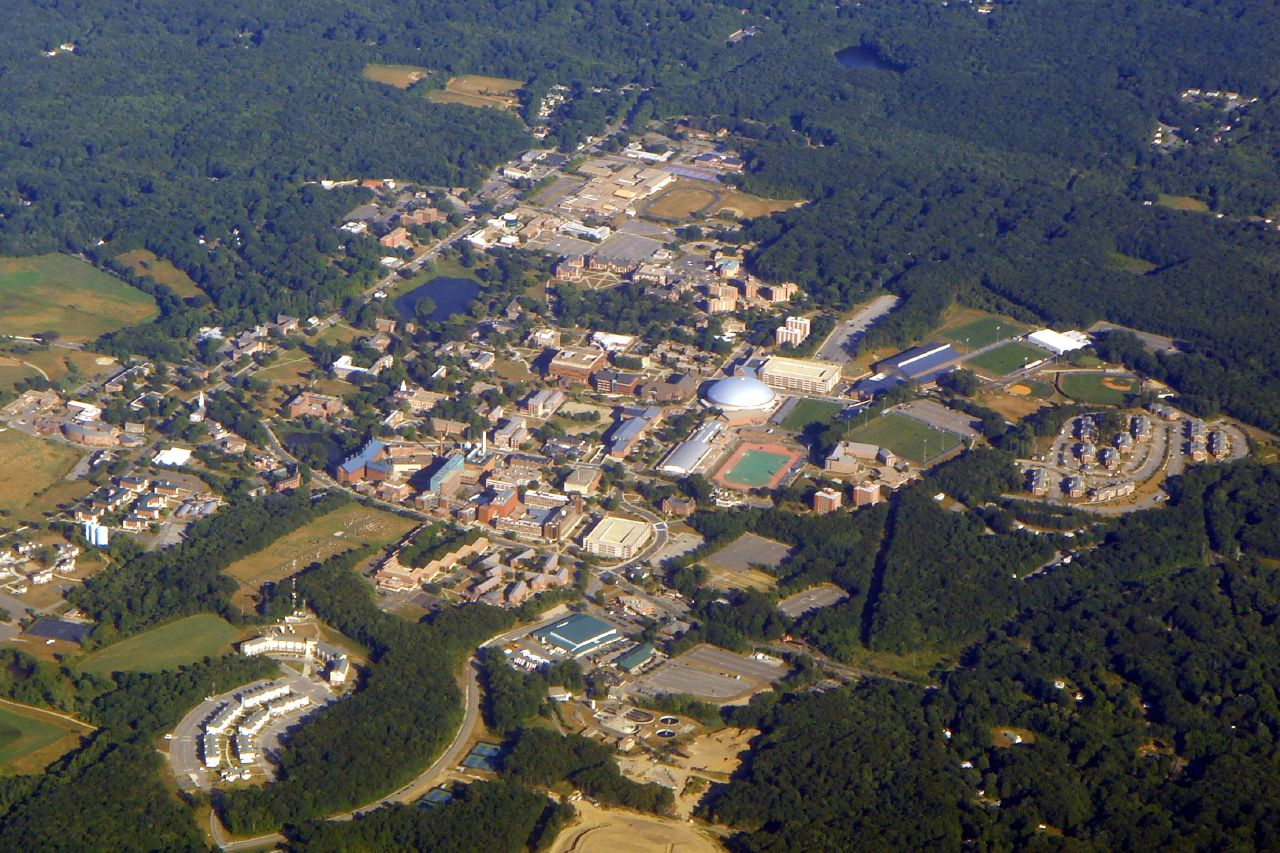
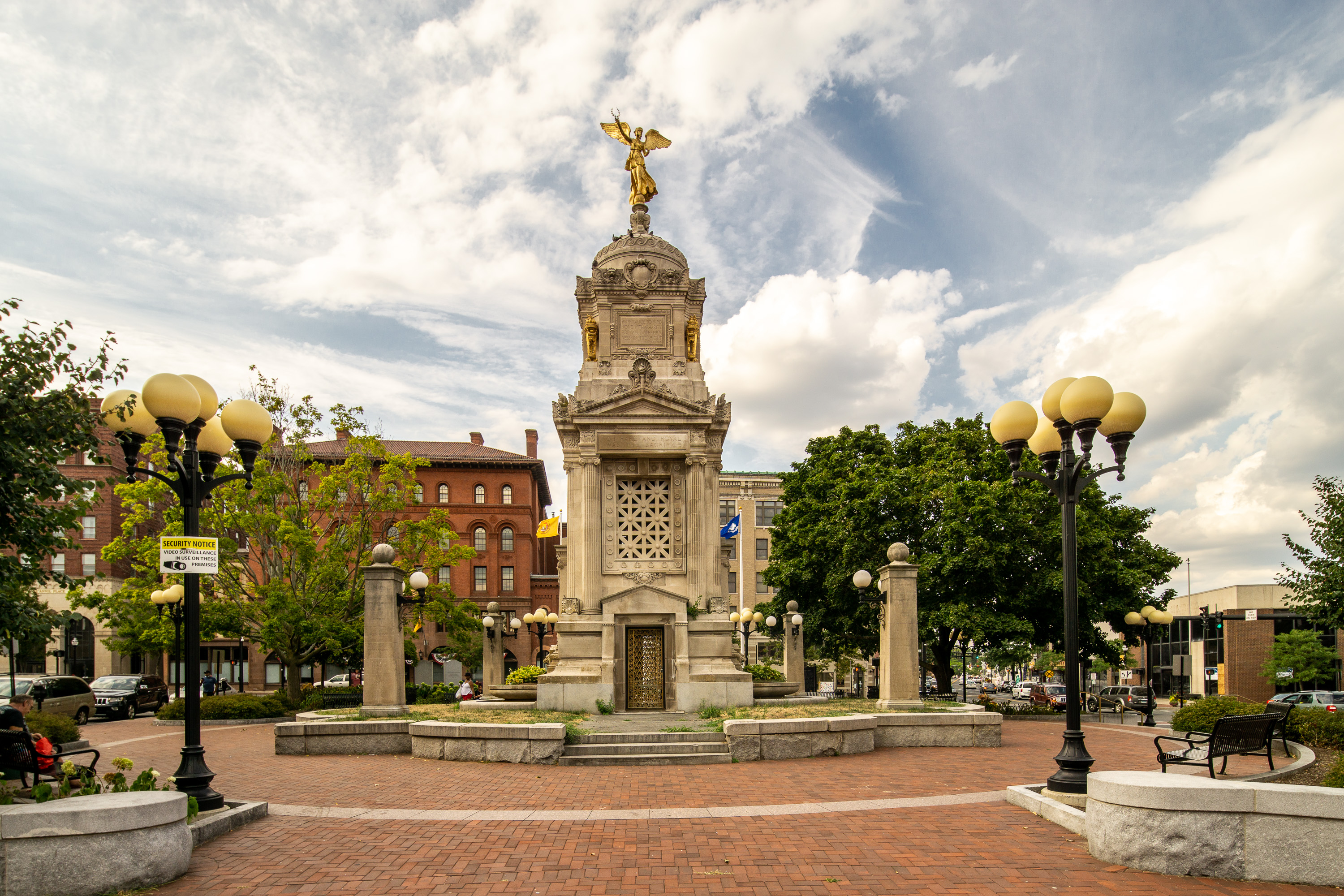
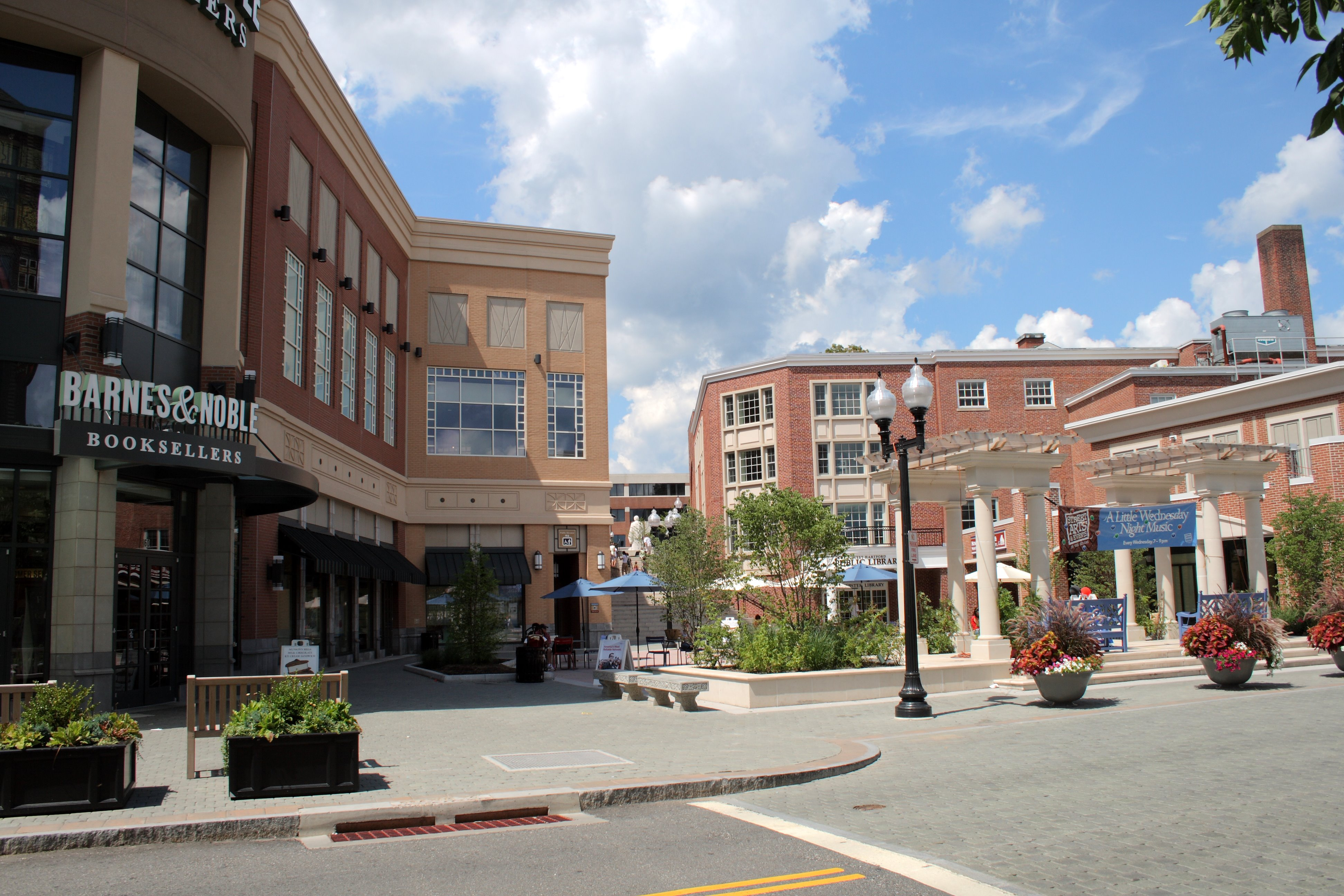
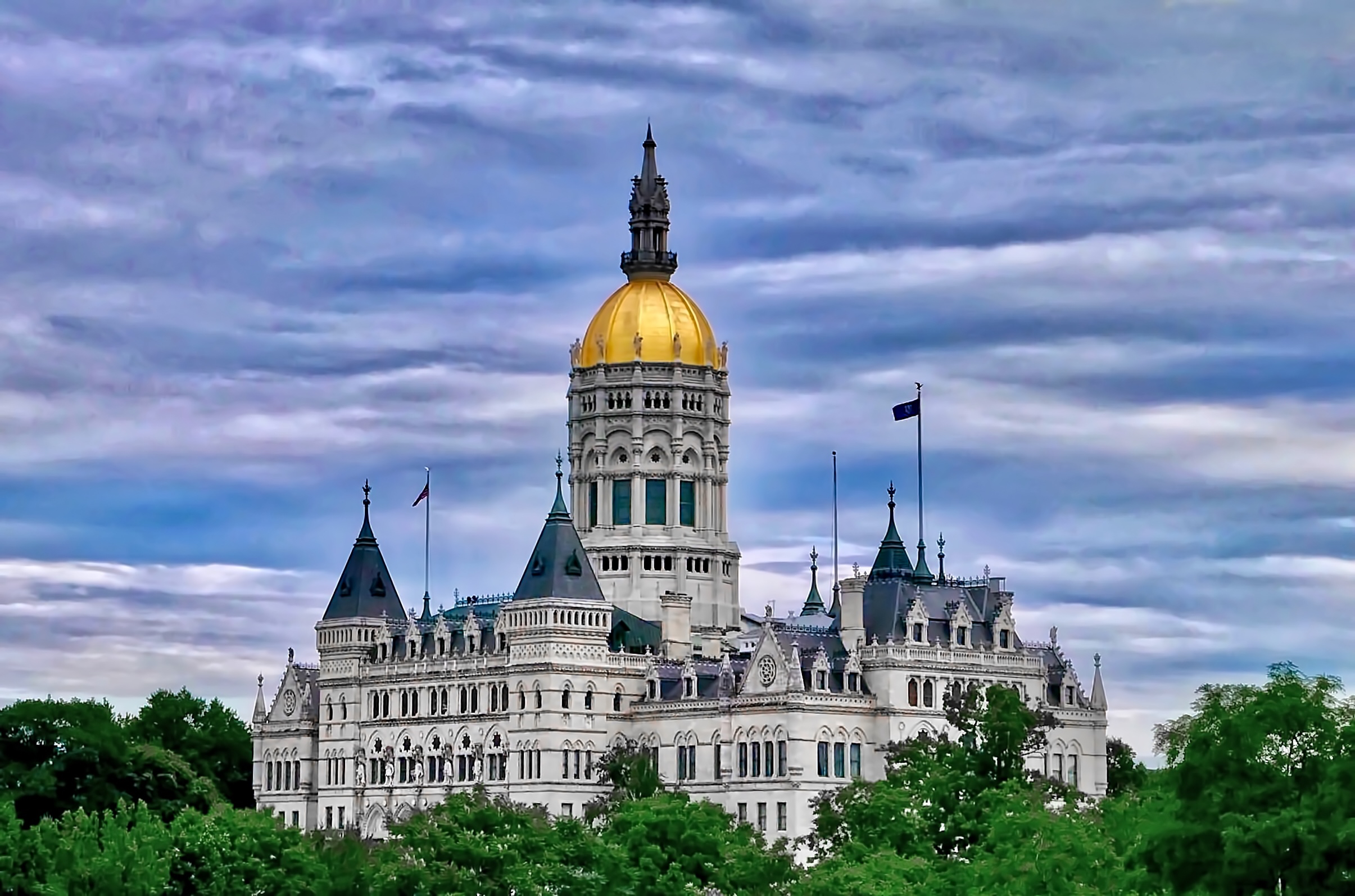
- Downtown Hartford University of Connecticut Downtown New Britain Blue Back Square Connecticut State Capitol

- Logo

- Location within the U.S. state of Connecticut
- Interactive map of Capitol Region Council of Governments (CRCOG)
- Coordinates: 41.81697°N 72.575886°W
- Country: United States
- State: Connecticut
- Founded: 2013
- Named for: the state's capital city, Hartford
- Seat: Hartford
- Largest city: Hartford
- Other cities: New Britain

Government
  - Executive Director: Matthew Hart

Area
  - Total: 1,046.186 sq mi (2,709.61 km^{2})
  - Land: 1,027.354 sq mi (2,660.83 km^{2})
  - Water: 18.832 sq mi (48.77 km^{2}) 1.80%

Population (2020)
  - Total: 976,248
  - Estimate (2025): 994,115 ▲
  - Density: 965.029/sq mi (372.600/km^{2})
- Time zone: UTC−5 (Eastern)
  - Summer (DST): UTC−4 (EDT)
- Area code: 860 and 959
- Congressional districts: 1st, 2nd, 5th
- Website: crcog.org

The Capitol Planning Region is a planning region and county-equivalent in the U.S. state of Connecticut. As of the 2020 census, the population was 976,248, and was estimated to be 991,508 in 2024, making it the most populous planning region in Connecticut. Its county seat and the largest city is Hartford, the state capital.

It is served by the coterminous Capitol Region Council of Governments (CRCOG). In 2022, planning regions were approved to replace Connecticut's counties as county-equivalents for statistical purposes, with full implementation occurring by 2024.

== History ==
The Capitol Planning Region was established in 2013.

== Geography ==
According to the United States Census Bureau, the planning region has a total area of 1,046.186 square miles (2,709.61 km^{2}), of which 1,027.354 square miles (2,660.83 km^{2}) is land and 18.832 square miles (48.77 km^{2}) (1.80%) is water. It is the largest planning region in Connecticut by total area.

== Demographics ==
Historical population
Census	Pop.	Note	%±
1790	9,974		—
1800	11,055		10.8%
1810	12,266		11.0%
1820	53,739		338.1%
1830	56,329		4.8%
1840	61,763		9.6%
1850	85,810		38.9%
1860	99,882		16.4%
1870	123,043		23.2%
1880	139,026		13.0%
1890	160,093		15.2%
1900	205,918		28.6%
1910	260,954		26.7%
1920	340,809		30.6%
1930	419,731		23.2%
1940	450,108		7.2%
1950	545,753		21.2%
1960	708,580		29.8%
1970	858,874		21.2%
1980	857,597		−0.1%
1990	910,338		6.1%
2000	922,590		1.3%
2010	973,972		5.6%
2020	976,248		0.2%
2025 (est.)	994,115	▲	1.8%
U.S. Decennial Census; 2020

As of the 2023 American Community Survey, there are 389,086 estimated households in Capitol Planning Region with an average of 2.41 persons per household. The planning region has a median household income of $91,541. Approximately 9.8% of the planning region's population lives at or below the poverty line. Capitol Planning Region has an estimated 65.9% employment rate, with 41.5% of the population holding a bachelor's degree or higher and 91.2% holding a high school diploma.

=== 2023 estimate ===
As of the 2023 estimate, there were 975,328 people and 389,086 households residing in the planning region. There were 417,696 housing units at an average density of 406.57 per square mile (157.0/km^{2}). The racial makeup of the planning region was 75.0% White (61.1% NH White), 14.9% African American, 0.6% Native American, Asian, 0.1% Pacific Islander, _% from some other races and 2.9% from two or more races. Hispanic or Latino people of any race were 17.9% of the population.

=== 2020 census ===
As of the 2020 census, there were 976,248 people residing in the planning region.

== Municipalities ==
The following municipalities are members of the Capitol Planning Region:

=== Cities ===
- Hartford, the capital city
- New Britain

=== Towns ===
- Andover
- Avon
- Berlin
- Bloomfield
- Bolton
- Canton
- Columbia
- Coventry
- East Granby
- East Hartford
- East Windsor
- Ellington
- Enfield
- Farmington
- Glastonbury
- Granby
- Hebron
- Manchester
- Mansfield
- Marlborough
- Newington
- Plainville
- Rocky Hill
- Simsbury
- Somers
- Southington
- South Windsor
- Stafford
- Suffield
- Tolland
- Vernon
- West Hartford
- Wethersfield
- Willington
- Windsor
- Windsor Locks
