= Elmwood, West Hartford =

Elmwood
- Neighborhood in West Hartford
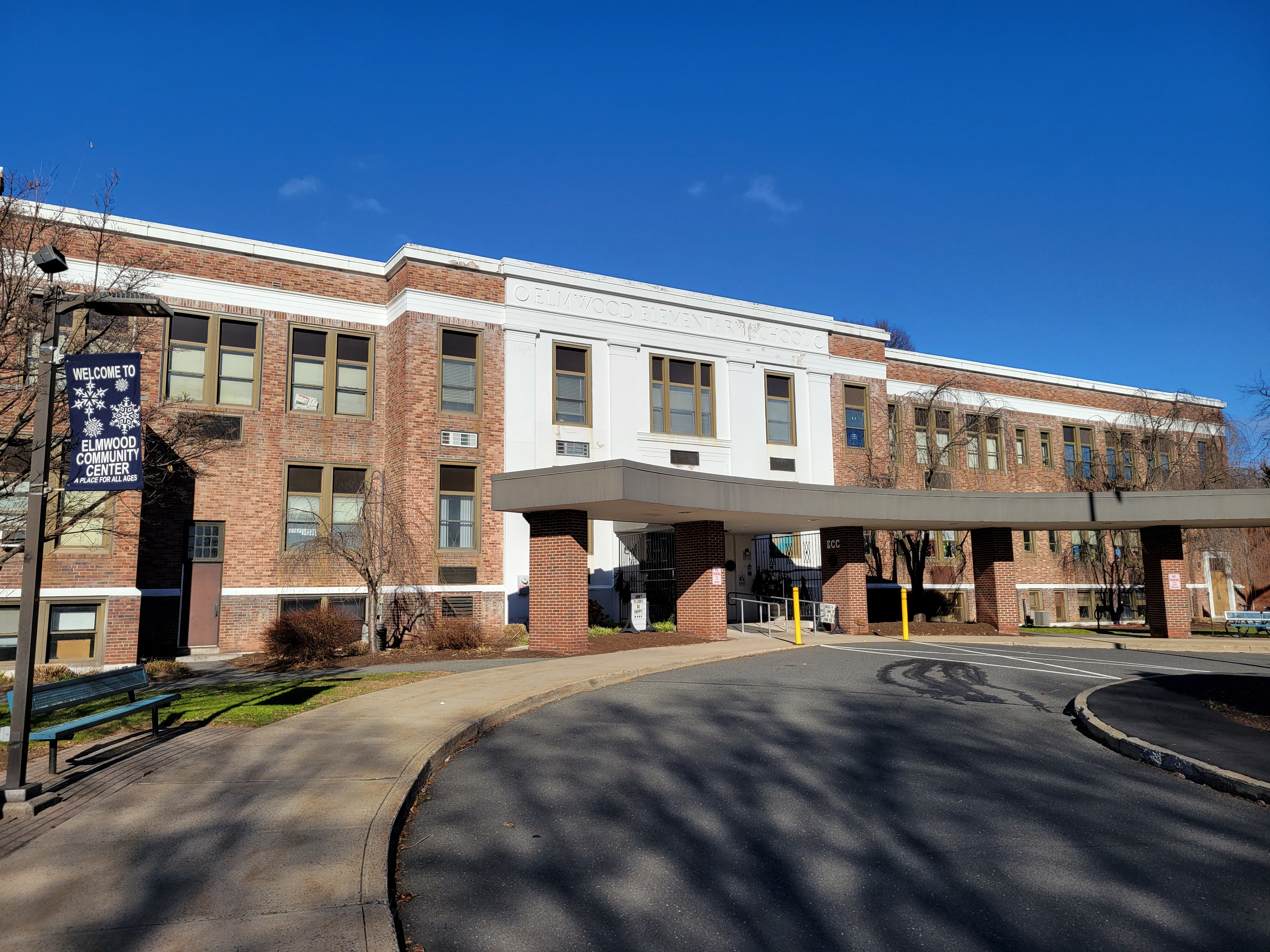
- Elmwood Community Center
- Interactive map of Elmwood
- Coordinates: 41.7331°N 72.7222°W
- Country: United States
- State: Connecticut
- County: Hartford
- Time zone: Eastern
- Area code: 860

Elmwood is a neighborhood in West Hartford, Connecticut that encompasses the area south of Interstate 84 and east of South Main Street, extending to the borders of neighboring Newington and Hartford. It is primarily a middle-class and working-class enclave of 10,800 residents composed mostly of postwar single-family homes and duplexes.

== History ==
As with the rest of West Hartford, Elmwood was mostly rural and sparsely populated, consisting of farmland and agriculture, until suburban residential development unfolded throughout the 20th century. Once home to a substantial Irish and Italian American community, Elmwood today is West Hartford's most racially diverse section of town.

== Education ==
=== Public schools ===
- Charter Oak International Academy
- Wolcott Elementary School

== Infrastructure ==
Elmwood's main thoroughfares include New Britain Avenue, Newington Road and New Park Avenue. The commercial section of New Britain Avenue is known as Elmwood Center, an area composed of local businesses, services, and restaurants. Newington Road and New Park Avenue are formerly areas where the manufacturing sector thrived in previous decades and have experienced steady revitalizations in recent years. Elmwood is the site of the former Talcott Middle School, which has since been renovated into luxury condominiums. It is also home to Beachland Park and the southernmost point of the town's Trout Brook Trail.

Elmwood is a stop on CTfastrak near the intersection of New Britain Avenue and New Park Avenue.
