= West Hartford, Connecticut =

- Town
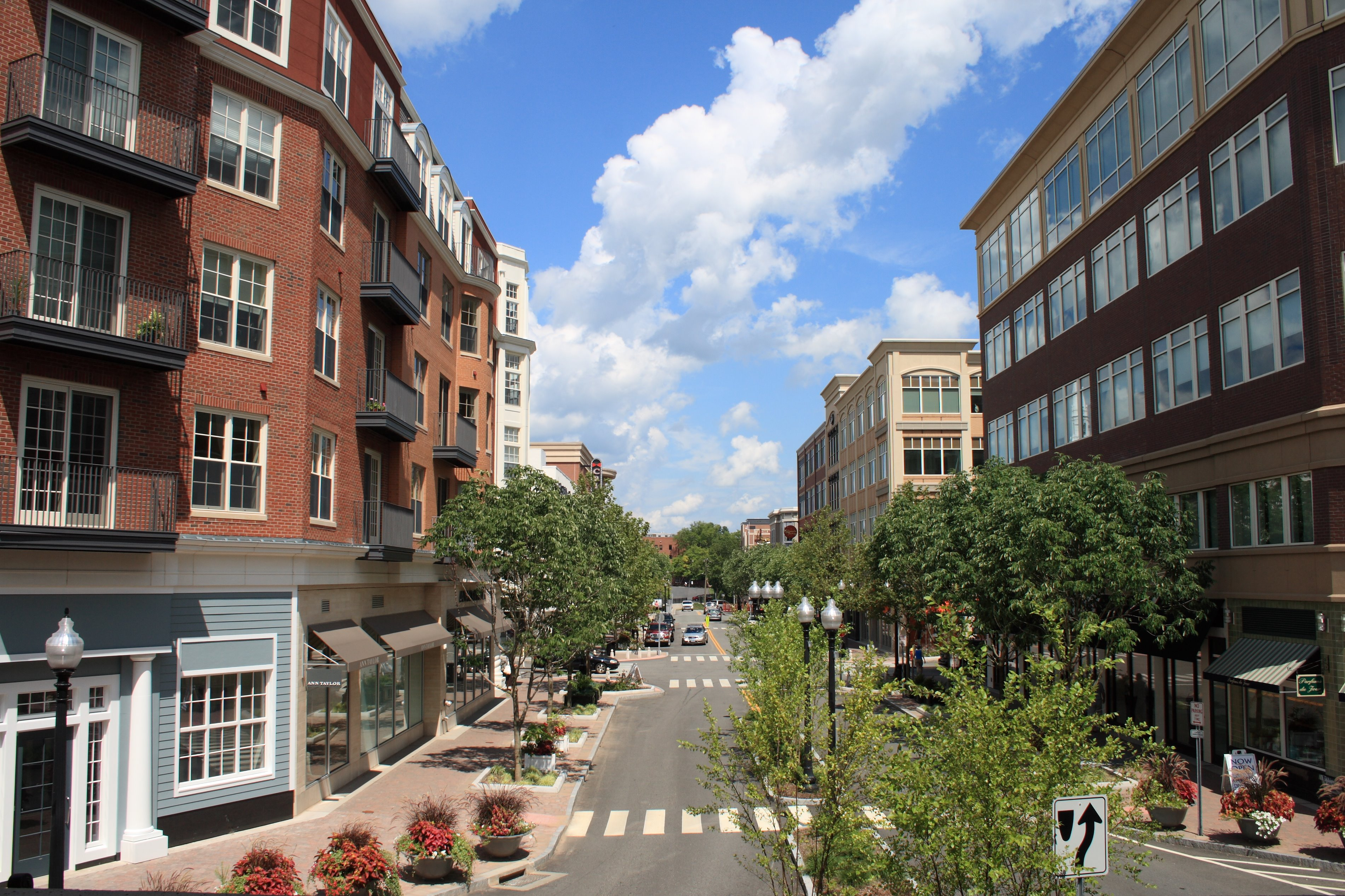
- Blue Back Square

- Seal Logo
- Nickname: WeHa
- Motto: Where City Style Meets Village Charm
- Interactive map of West Hartford, Connecticut
- Location within the state of Connecticut Location within the United States
- Coordinates: 41°46′04″N 72°45′14″W
- Country: United States
- U.S. state: Connecticut
- County: Hartford
- Region: Capitol Region
- Settled: 1679
- Incorporated: May 3, 1854

Government
  - Type: Council-manager
  - Town manager: Rick Ledwith
  - Town council: Shari Cantor (D), Mayor; Debra Polun, Deputy Mayor; John Lyons; Gayle Harris; Lisa Lazarus; Tiffani McGinnis; Barry Walters; Jason Wang; Ben Wenograd

Area
  - Total: 22.3 sq mi (57.7 km^{2})
  - Land: 21.9 sq mi (56.6 km^{2})
  - Water: 0.42 sq mi (1.1 km^{2})
- Elevation: 160 ft (50 m)

Population (2020)
  - Total: 64,083
  - Density: 2,930/sq mi (1,130/km^{2})
- Time zone: UTC−5 (Eastern)
  - Summer (DST): UTC−4 (Eastern)
- ZIP Codes: 06107, 06110, 06117, 06119
- Area codes: 860/959
- FIPS code: 09-82590
- GNIS feature ID: 0213529
- Website: www.westhartfordct.gov

West Hartford is a town in Hartford County, Connecticut, United States, 5 miles (8.0 km) west of downtown Hartford. The town is part of the Capitol Planning Region. The population was 64,083 at the 2020 census.

The town's popular downtown area is colloquially known as "West Hartford Center," or simply "The Center," and is centered on Farmington Avenue and South/North Main Street. West Hartford Center has been the community's main commercial hub since the late 17th century.

Incorporated as a town in 1854, West Hartford was previously a parish of Hartford, founded in 1672. Among the southernmost of the communities in the Hartford-Springfield Knowledge Corridor metropolitan region, West Hartford is home to University of Hartford and the University of Saint Joseph.

West Hartford is home to regular events that draw large crowds from neighboring towns, including the Elizabeth Park Concert Series, and the annual Celebrate West Hartford event, which includes fairground rides, food vendors, musical performances, and stalls by local businesses.

== History ==
According to archaeological evidence, the Wampanoag people used West Hartford as one of their winter camps. Fishing and hunting along the Connecticut River, the area of West Hartford offered the Wampanoag people a refuge from the cold winter wind and the river's severe spring flooding. In 1636 Reverend Thomas Hooker led a group of followers from what is now Cambridge, Massachusetts to the "Great River" and established Hartford, Connecticut and the Connecticut Colony. As the colony grew, additional land was needed. In 1672 the Proprietors of Hartford ordered that a Division be created to the West. A total of "72 Long Lots" were laid out between today's Quaker Lane in the East and Mountain Road in the West. The northern boundary was Bloomfield, and the Southern, present day New Britain Avenue. (The western boundary was extended in 1830 to include part of Farmington). In the 1670s, the area was referred to as the "West Division" of Hartford. This remained the official name until 1806 when Connecticut General Assembly started referring to it as "the Society of West Hartford."

It is believed that the first homesteader to West Hartford was Stephen Hosmer whose father was in Hooker's first group of Hartford settlers and who later owned 300 acres (1,200,000 m^{2}) just north of the present day Center. In 1679, Stephen Hosmer's father sent him to establish a sawmill on the property. Young Hosmer would eventually go back to live in Hartford, but in his 1693 estate inventory, 310 acres (1,300,000 m^{2}) in West Hartford along with a house and a sawmill are listed. For nearly a century the property would be handed down throughout the family. Evidence still remains of the Town's first industry, as Stephen Hosmer's mill pond and dam can still be found today on the westernmost side of North Main Street.

By the time of the American Revolution, the once rugged wilderness had been largely clear and a new agricultural-based community had developed with a population of just over 1,000 residents and 3,000 sheep. At its core was the parish meeting house. The First Congregational Meeting House was built around 1712. Now in its 5th building, the church stands proudly at what is now the southeast corner of Main Street and Farmington Avenue. As the focus of early religious, political, and social life, the meeting house helped to provide this area with a name, a title that it still holds today—"The Center."

Evidence in the Hartford Courant and in the 1790s census show that some of the more prosperous households relied on laborers and slaves for fieldwork and domestic help. The Sarah Whitman Hooker House was one such residence and still stands on New Britain Avenue. Evidence shows that the Hookers owned several slaves. One such slave, Bristow, bought his freedom from Thomas Hart Hooker in April 1775 as Hooker set off to fight in the Revolutionary War. Bristow continued to live with the family after Thomas Hart Hooker was killed in the war. Bristow became an agricultural expert and left his property to the Hookers' two children when he died. He is the only known African American to be buried in West Hartford's Old Center Burial Yard. West Hartford's Bristow Middle School is named in his honor.

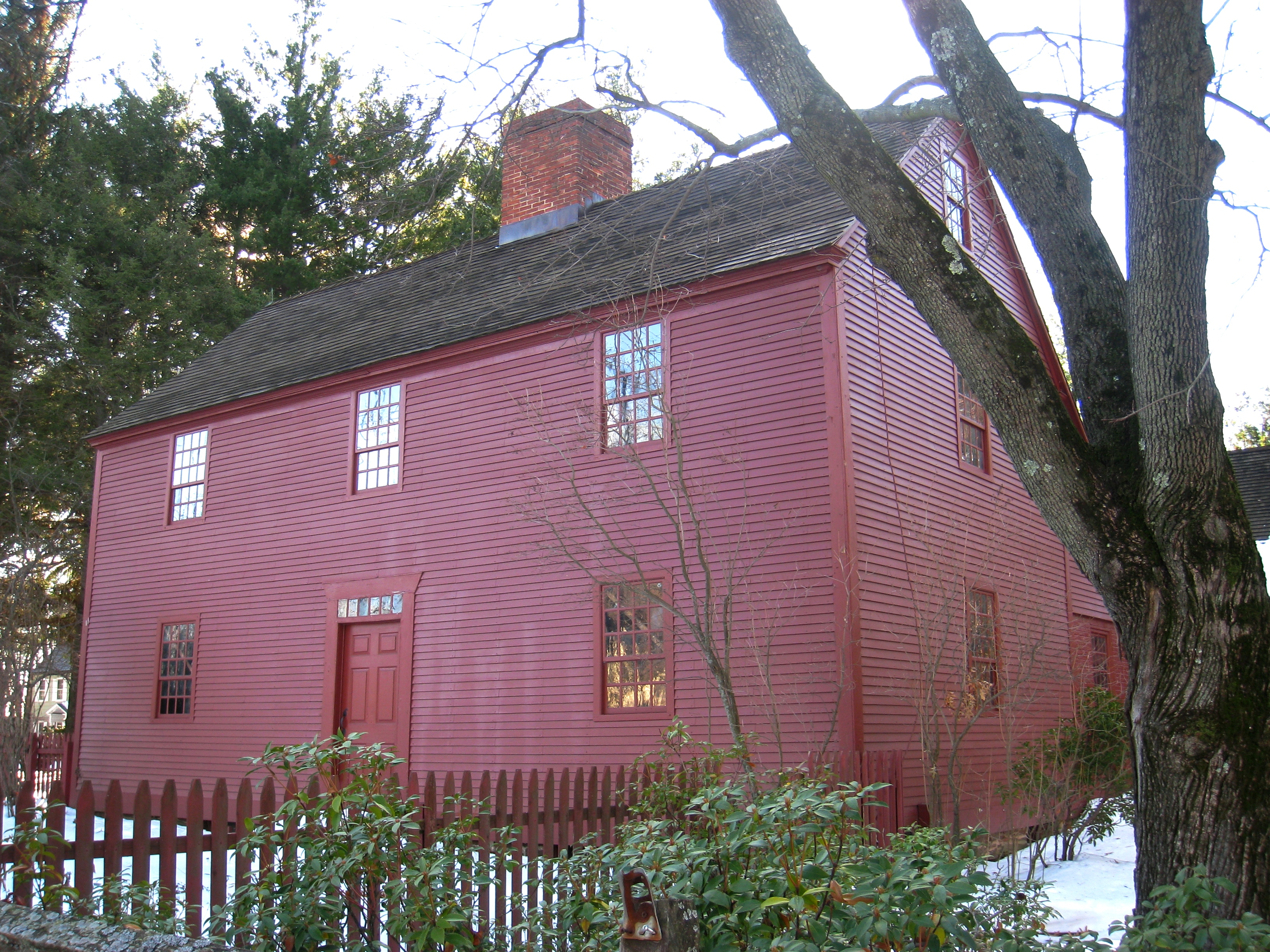
Noah Webster House – front facade

=== Coming of industry ===
One of the first major industries to arise centered on the pottery and brick works. Extending from Hartford to Berlin is a sizable deposit of fine clay. In 1770, Ebenezer Faxon came from Massachusetts and settled in what would become the Elmwood section of West Hartford. There he established a pottery on South Road (what is today New Britain Avenue) which took advantage of the local geological landscape. It was Seth Goodwin, however, who helped to establish a pottery dynasty. Goodwin started his pottery works around 1798. For over a hundred years, the Goodwin name would be associated with West Hartford pottery. Producing utilitarian items such as jugs for the gin manufactured in local distilleries, to terra cotta designs and fine china, the Goodwin Company employed up to 75 people in its heyday. The Goodwin Brothers Pottery Company (as it came to be known) burned for the third time in 1908 and never recovered.

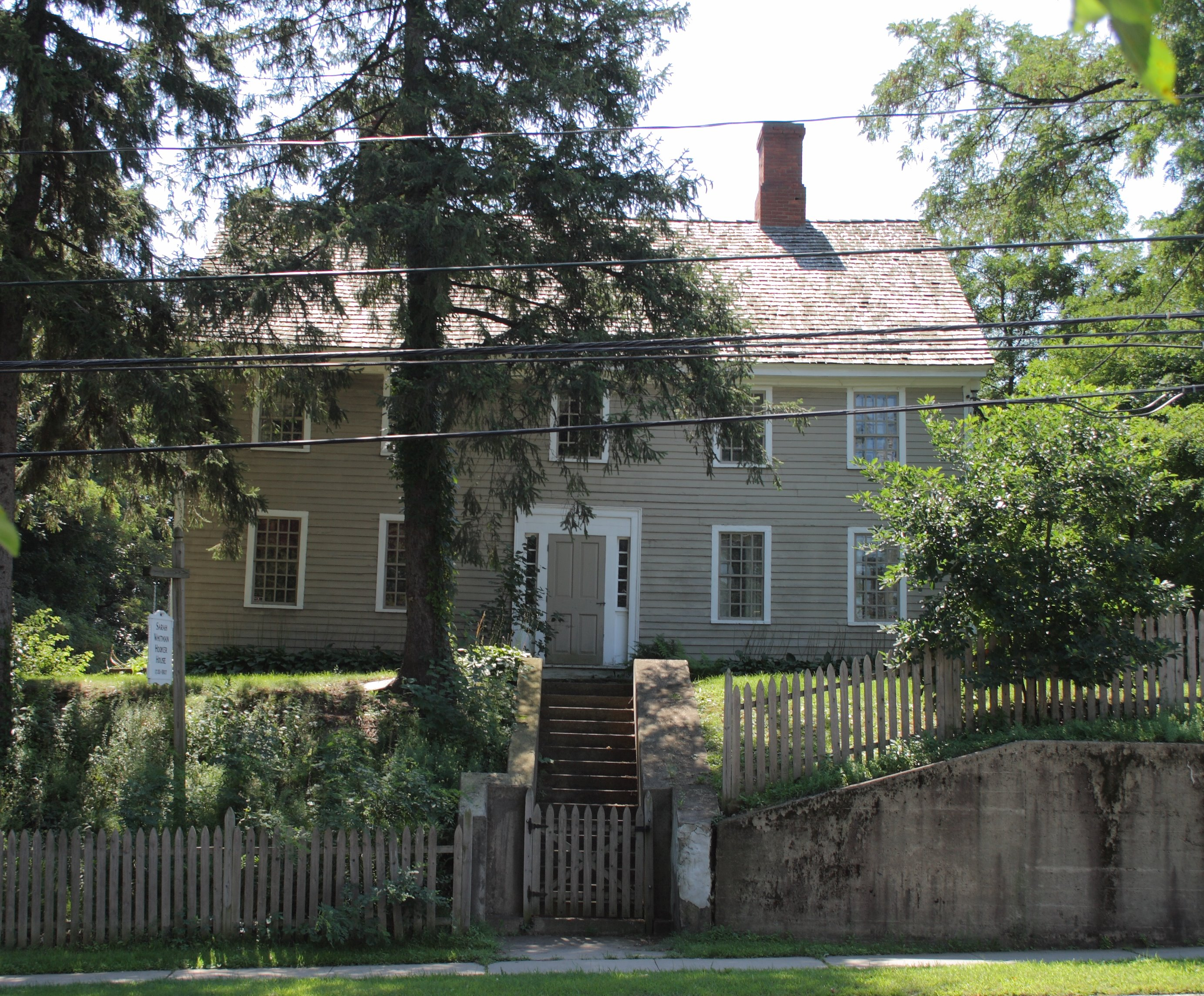
Sarah Whitman Hooker House in West Hartford

In 1879 Edwin Arnold established the Trout Brook Ice & Feed Company. Ice from Trout Brook, a stream that runs through the middle of West Hartford, was harvested in the winter, sawn into blocks, and placed into a series of ice houses through an escalator system. Insulated in sawdust, the blocks of ice were used as refrigeration locally and shipped as far away as New York City. By the late 19th century, the New York, New Haven & Hartford Railroad ran through part of Elmwood in the southeast corner of town. A variety of companies cropped up in this area including Whitlock Coil Pipe Company in 1891, and later Royal Typewriter, Wiremold, Abbot Ball, Colt's Manufacturing and Uncle Bill's Silver Grippers (producer of tweezers). The largest of West Hartford manufacturers was Pratt & Whitney (now Pratt & Whitney Measurement Systems, which later lent its name to Pratt & Whitney, the aerospace corporation headquartered in East Hartford). In 1940 it built a plant on 20 acres (81,000 m^{2}) and at the height of World War II it employed over 7,000 people. It would stand until 1991, when Pratt & Whitney Measurement Systems was acquired and operations were relocated to Plainville.

=== A new town ===
In 1792 a committee of residents was appointed to ask permission from Hartford to secede, and were denied. Five years later they petitioned again and again were denied. In the spring of 1854, the Connecticut General Assembly was meeting in New Haven (co-capitol with Hartford at the time). Most likely taking advantage of the distance from Hartford, a petition dated March 21 was delivered to the General Assembly by delegates from West Hartford. Signed by 153 residents, the petition claimed that residences were "subjected to many inconveniences on account of their present connection with the town and city of Hartford and that their convenience and prosperity would be essentially promoted by being set off as a separate town." On April 26, about 100 residents from West Hartford presented their own case against secession. After review and an opportunity for Hartford to make an argument for keeping West Hartford, the General Assembly voted on May 3 for West Hartford's independence.

The 1854 vote was not however the end of the debate. In 1895 wealthy residents from the "East Side" of West Hartford petitioned Hartford for annexation. Their call was rebuffed by other West Hartford residents. Then in 1923 and 1924 Hartford wanted to annex West Hartford back so that it could achieve a "Greater Hartford Plan." Town residents rallied in opposition and the plan was defeated by a vote of 2,100 to 6137.

=== Emergence as a streetcar suburb ===
It is transportation that has had the biggest impact on West Hartford and its evolution from sleepy crossroads to modern suburb. In the late 18th and early 19th century three turnpikes ran through West Hartford. Around these roads, taverns, blacksmith and wheelwright shops, general stores and many other places of businesses sprang up. Early maps provide a sense of how important these byways were in the development of commerce and industry. Then came the trolleys—starting in 1845, Fred Brace began running a horse-drawn omnibus from his home on the corner of Farmington Avenue and Dale Street into downtown Hartford. Even more significant were the horse-drawn trolley lines and later electric trolleys that in 1889 began to weave their way from the inner city of Hartford to the countryside of West Hartford. Trolley lines opened up a land that had been inaccessible to many, and made it possible for professionals and their families to settle along Prospect Avenue, then north of Farmington Avenue.

By the 1880s, Hartford began to experience an economic boom. As such Hartford's business leaders began building their mansions along Prospect Avenue. Prospect Hill, situated on a one-mile-long (1.6 km) ridge boasting impressive views of the burgeoning city, became the area's most prestigious address. Homes are characteristic of the architectural styles popular in that period are represented, particularly Late 19th and 20th Century Revivals. Many homes in the area on the National Register of Historic Places, including the Connecticut Governor's Residence, built in 1908. Prospect Avenue is adjacent to Elizabeth Park, designed by acclaimed landscape architect Frederick Law Olmsted in 1896 and named for the wife of Charles M. Pond, who bequeathed the land to the City of Hartford. In 1900, the Hartford Golf Club opened its links on the other side of Asylum Avenue just west of Prospect Avenue, adding to the area's ideal suburban sensibility.

In 1895, Wood, Harmon and Company created one of the town's first subdivisions on property known as Stanley Farm, a tract sloping upward from the trolley line that then ran along Farmington Avenue, across from Reservoir No. 1. Called Buena Vista, it was promoted it "Hartford's New and Handsome Suburb." Their literature highlighted "splendid suburban electric car service" and proximity to Reservoir No. 1.

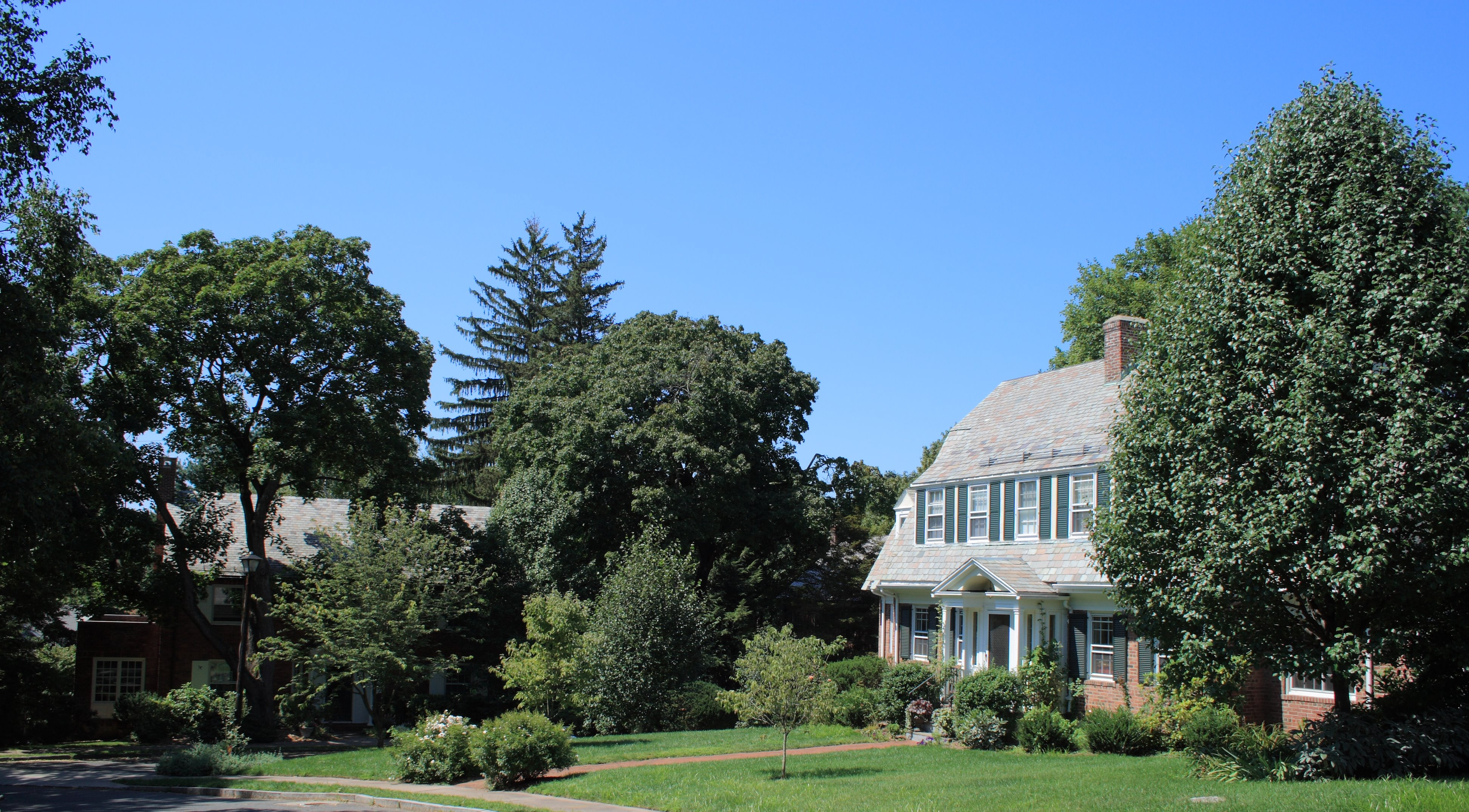
West Hill Historic District in West Hartford 2

Other developments followed including "Elmhurst" in Elmwood (1901), and Sunset Farm (1917). One of the most exclusive of these early developments was West Hill. Located on the former estate of Cornelius Vanderbilt, son of the famous financier and transportation magnet, it was the brainchild of Horace R. Grant. Designed by some of Hartford's best architects in the 1920s, West Hill is significant historically because it is an excellent example of a planned real estate development of the early 1920s that proceeded under specific design restrictions to achieve outstanding success as a well-crafted and prestigious neighborhood. The architecture is characteristic of the Colonial Revival and Tudor Revival styles popular in the period. It was declared a National Historic District in 1996.

=== The automobile ===
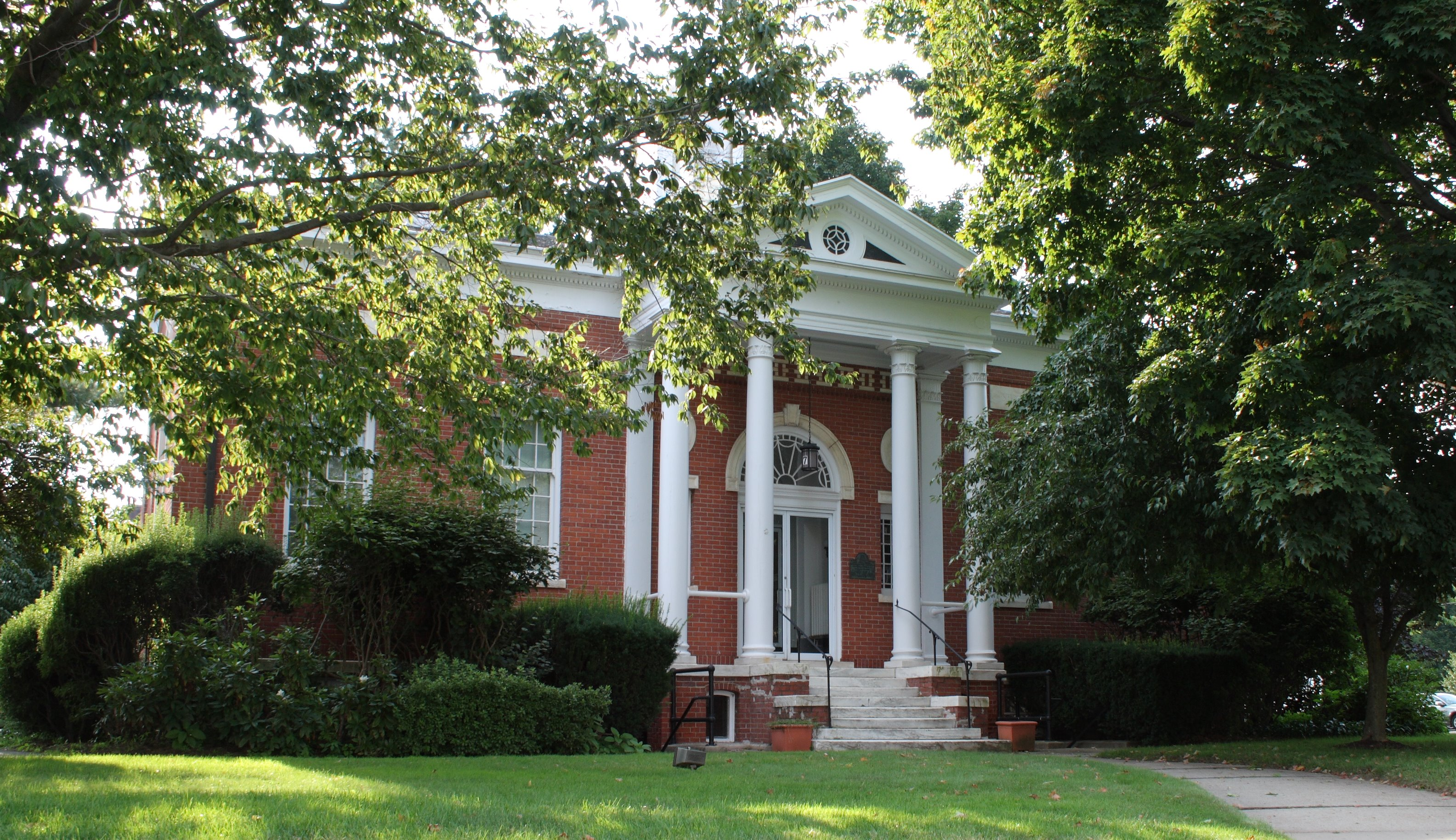
Old Noah Webster Memorial Library building

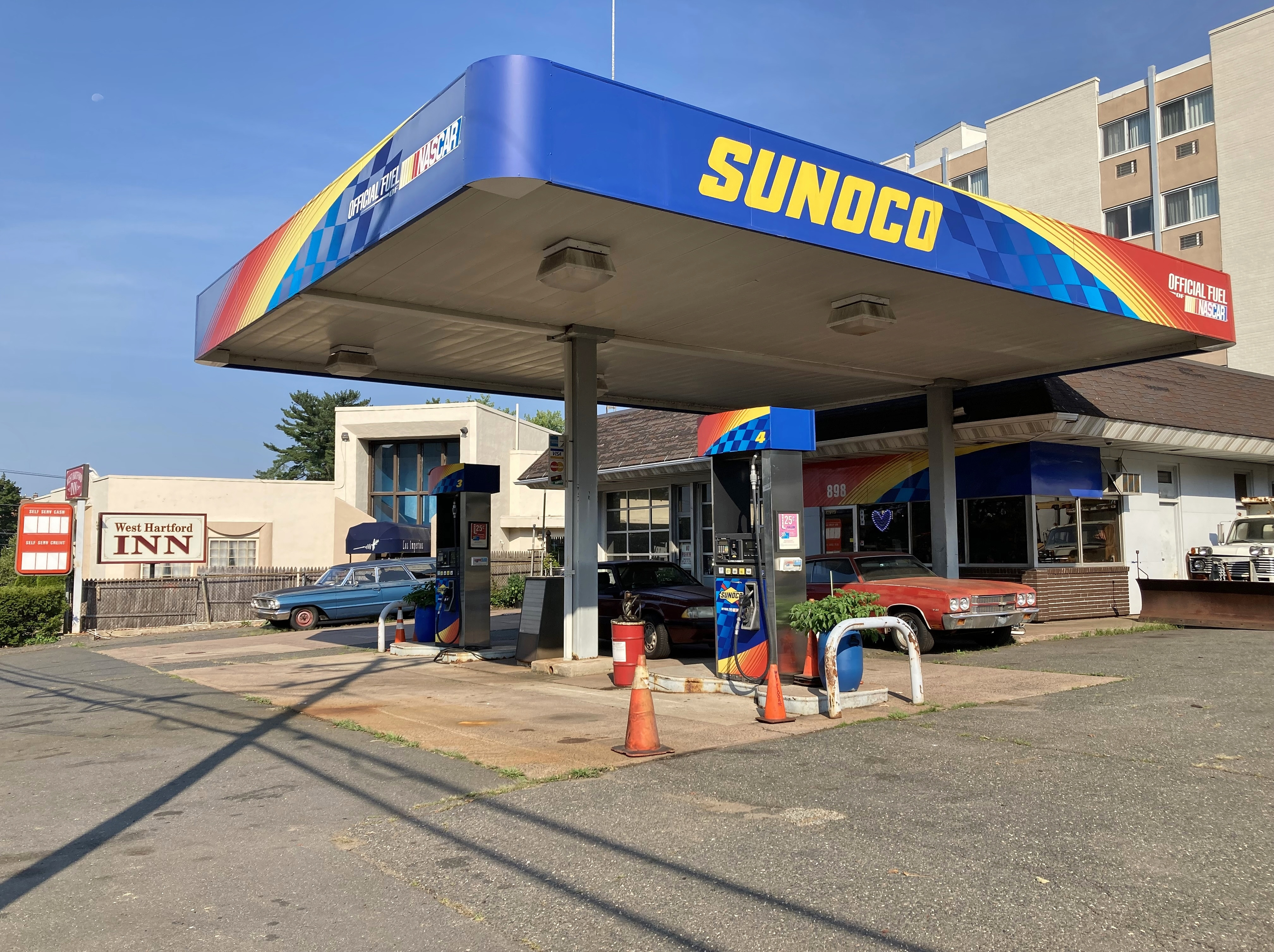
Service station on Farmington Avenue, operated by the same family from the early 1960s through 2021

By the 1920s and 1930s, the impact of the automobile began to felt in West Hartford as the town became more accessible to Hartford's middle and working class citizens. Between 1910 and 1930, the population of West Hartford grew from 4,808 to 24,941 residents. Then, with the end of the Great Depression, World War II, and the exodus from urban centers, West Hartford witnessed a tremendous influx of people as its population swelled from 33,776 in 1940 to 62,382 people by 1960. This high-growth era ushered in major housing developments and retail spaces throughout the community.

In the 1950s, the primary avenues—Albany, Asylum and Farmington—became important arteries for commuters, and their access made West Hartford attractive to middle-class families. During the decade, the town built one new elementary school each year to accommodate the growing population. In the 1960s, construction began on Interstate 84, completed in 1969. The interstate had many ramifications for the community, the most visible being that it bisected the town, isolating the more industrial and ethnically diverse neighborhood of Elmwood from the rest of West Hartford. Furthermore, The interstate allowed for increased accessibility as the population increased with the Baby Boom and development, and recalibrated the traditional retail sites.

Subsequent residential development continued on through the late 1970s, particularly in the town's northern, western and far southwestern fringes, as evidenced by the many large colonial, ranch, and split level-style homes in these areas. In 1971, the Bishops Corner development was inaugurated. Housing tenants such as Lord & Taylor, F.W. Woolworth, and Doubleday Book Shop drew shoppers from across the region; the center with its largely independently owned stores, were negatively impacted by the new retail traffic patterns.

Towards the town's southwest fringe lies Westfarms Mall. Opened in 1974 with original anchors JC Penney, G. Fox & Co., and Sage-Allen, the mall further recalibrated retail in West Hartford. It became well known for its lavish ceilings and waterfall-style fountain. Sitting astride I-84, conveniently connected to the town's main internal arteries, and comprising more than 1,300,000 square feet (120,000 m^{2}) of stores and restaurants, it is the third largest indoor mall in Connecticut.

=== Zoning and segregation ===
In 1924, West Hartford became the first municipality in Connecticut to enact zoning, setting a precedent for other municipalities. The zoning legislation economically segregated residential areas by keeping expensive single-family homes away from multi-family housing, and preventing multi-family housing in single-family neighborhoods. West Hartford justified the zoning as intended to raise property values and keep undesirable groups out of the locality. The impetus for the zoning change was the failure of West Hartford leaders to prevent a Jewish grocery from setting up a grocery store in a West Hartford residential area a few years prior.

Alongside zoning, neighborhoods in West Hartford used racial covenants that prevented non-whites from owning or occupying buildings (until they were ruled unconstitutional by the Supreme Court in 1948). In the 1960s and 1970s, real estate agents engaged in racial steering to keep black people out of West Hartford. These policies have contributed to making West Hartford overwhelmingly white.

In recent years, attempts at building multi-family housing in West Hartford have been met with protests from residents.

=== Heist ===
In 1983, a robbery was committed by a militant Puerto Rican group called "Los Macheteros" where they robbed a Wells Fargo depot situated in West Hartford, netting $7 million. At the time, it was the largest heist in US history.

=== Blue Back Square ===
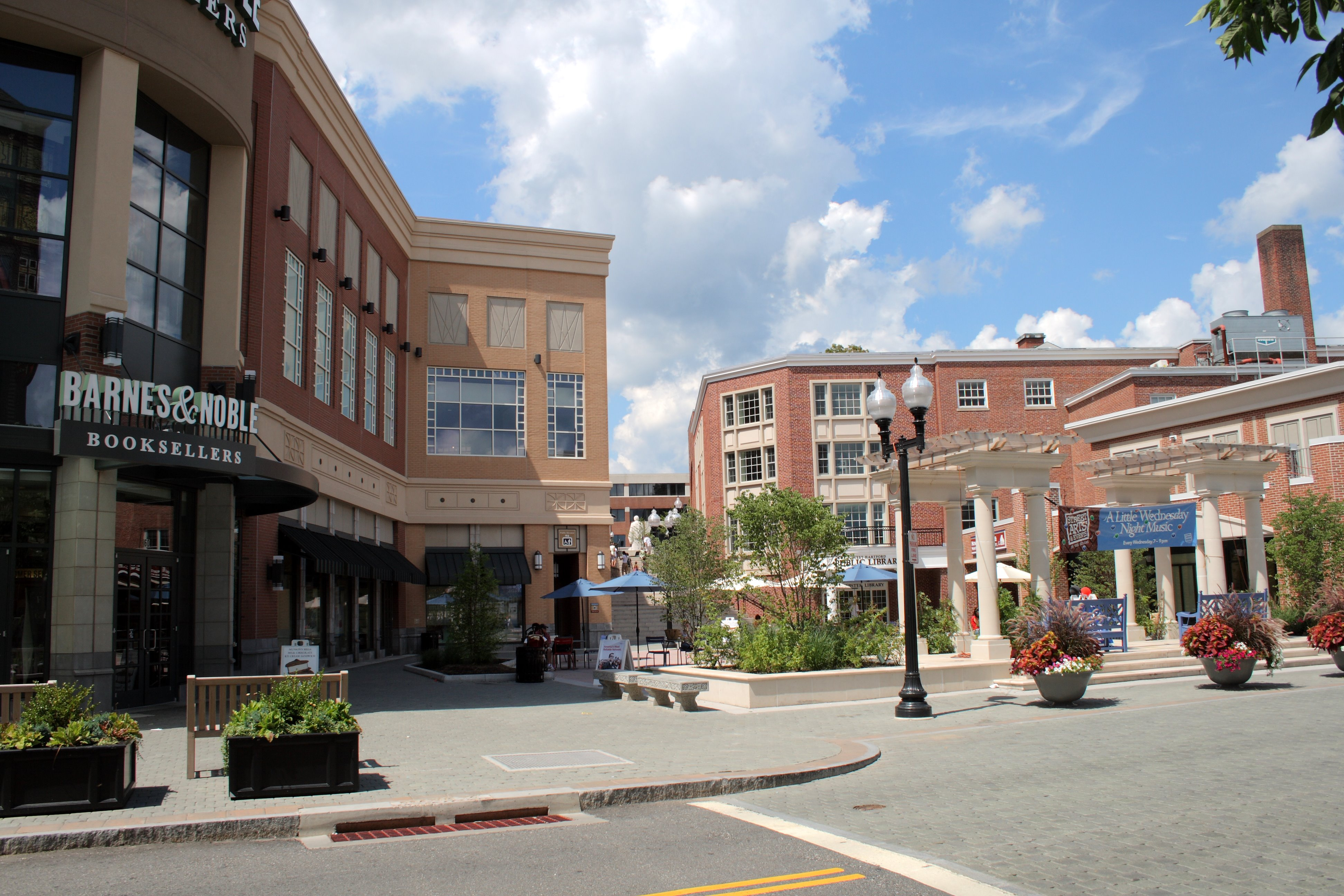
Outside the library at Blue Back Square in West Hartford, Connecticut

Opening in 2007, Blue Back Square is a pioneer mixed-use development in the Center that blends retail and residential living space on a large scale. The five-building complex contains 220,000 square feet (20,000 m^{2}) of ground floor retail space and 120 luxury space. Medical office space encompasses 137,000 square feet (12,700 m^{2}), and other professional offices total another 62,500 square feet (5,810 m^{2}) square feet. A six-screen movie theatre as well as two 500-space parking garages were also built. Named after Noah Webster's popular spelling book, Blue-Back Speller, the development has significantly altered the Center and furthered West Hartford's status as a regional dining and shopping destination.

== Geography ==
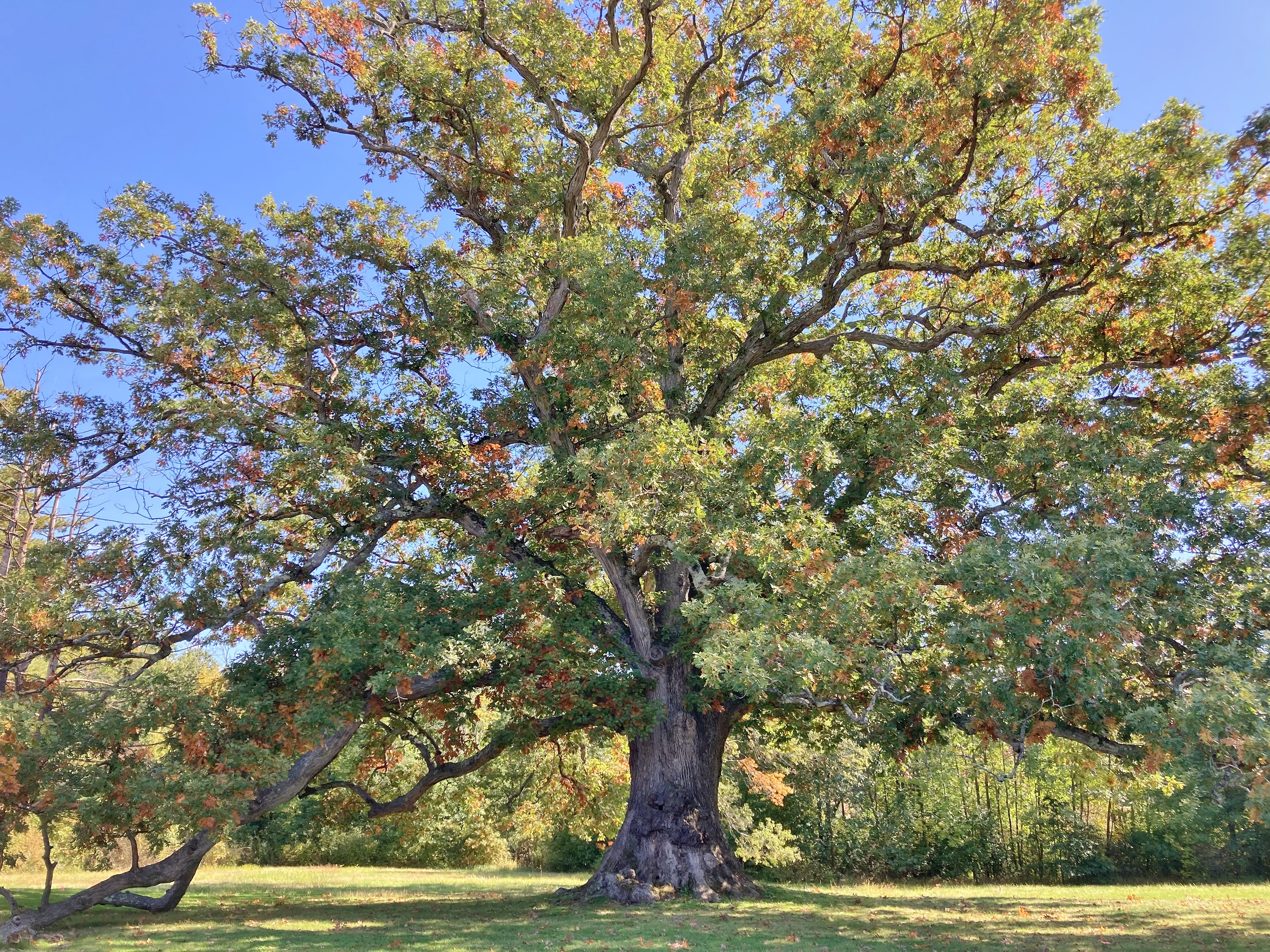
Connecticut co-champion white oak tree, located at the former UConn campus in West Hartford

According to the United States Census Bureau, the town has a total area of 22.3 square miles (57.7 km^{2}), of which 21.9 square miles (56.6 km^{2}) is land and 0.42 square miles (1.1 km^{2}), or 1.91%, is water.

The west side of West Hartford is flanked by the Metacomet Ridge, a mountainous trap rock ridgeline that stretches from Long Island Sound to nearly the Vermont border. Notable features of the Metacomet Ridge in West Hartford include Talcott Mountain and a number of highland water reservoirs belonging to the Metropolitan District, which maintains watershed and recreation resources on the property. The 51-mile-long (82 km) Metacomet Trail traverses the ridge. The town's web site indicates that the highest point in town is 778 feet (237 m) above sea level on Talcott (Avon) Mountain. The altitude at Town Hall is 120 feet (37 m).

West Hartford is adjacent to and west of Hartford, the state capital, and borders Bloomfield, Newington, New Britain, Farmington, and Avon. West Hartford is approximately 100 miles (160 km) southwest of Boston and 120 miles (190 km) northeast of New York City. Interstate 84 runs through West Hartford.

== Demographics ==
Historical population
Census	Pop.	Note	%±
1850	4,411		—
1860	1,296		−70.6%
1870	1,533		18.3%
1880	1,828		19.2%
1890	1,930		5.6%
1900	3,186		65.1%
1910	4,808		50.9%
1920	8,854		84.2%
1930	24,941		181.7%
1940	33,776		35.4%
1950	44,402		31.5%
1960	62,382		40.5%
1970	68,031		9.1%
1980	61,301		−9.9%
1990	60,110		−1.9%
2000	63,589		5.8%
2010	63,268		−0.5%
2020	64,083		1.3%
U.S. Decennial Census; 1850 census is the parish of Hartford.

As of the 2010 Census, there were 63,268 people, 25,258 households, and 16,139 families residing in the town. The population density was 2,888.9 inhabitants per square mile (1,115.4/km^{2}). There were 25,332 housing units at an average density of 1,152.3/square mile (445.0/km^{2}). The racial makeup of the town was 79.6% White, 6.3% African American, 0.2% Native American, 7.4% Asian, 0.03% Pacific Islander, 3.8% from other races, and 2.7% from two or more races. Hispanic or Latino of any race were 9.8% of the population.

Only 49.85% of West Hartford residents reported a religious affiliation. Of these, 31.74% were Roman Catholic, 3.29% Presbyterian, 2.19% Baptist, 2.19% Methodist, 1.59% Jewish, 1.39% Lutheran, 1.31% Episcopalian, 1.19% Pentecostal, 0.4% Mormon, 3.38% of another Christian denomination, and 0.34% were Muslim.

There were 25,258 households, out of which 30.5% had children under the age of 18 living with them, 50.7% were married couples living together, 10.3% had a female householder with no husband present, and 36.1% were non-families. 29.1% of all households were made up of individuals, and 13.1% had someone living alone who was 65 years of age or older. The average household size was 2.42 and the average family size was 3.06.

In the town, the population was spread out, with 23.3% under the age of 18, 9.8% from 18 to 24, 24.2% from 25 to 44, 28.1% from 45 to 64, and 17.1% who were 65 years of age or older. The median age was 41.5 years. For every 100 females, there were 86.5 males. For every 100 females age 18 and over, there were 82.2 males.

In 2018, the median household income was $99,280 and the per capita income for the town was $54,601. About 3.7% of families and 6.1% of the population were below the poverty line, including 5.3% of those under the age of 18 and 9.6% ages 65 or older.

== Economy ==
=== Top employers ===
Top employers in West Hartford according to the town's 2025 Comprehensive Annual Financial Report

#	Employer	# of Employees
1	Town of West Hartford	1,100–2,250
2	University of Hartford	1,100–2,250
3	Hartford Healthcare At Home	500–999
4	Triumph Engine Control Systems	250–499
5	Connecticut Veterinary Center	250–499
6	The Cheesecake Factory	250–499
7	Constructive Workshops Inc	250–499
8	Connecticut Behavioral Health	100–249
9	West Hartford Health & Rehabilitation	100–249
10	Stop & Shop	100–249

== Government ==
West Hartford has had council–manager government since 1919. It was the first town in the state and one of the first in the country to adopt this form of government, where the council acts as the elected policy board and the town manager serves as the chief executive officer responsible for carrying policies out. In 1921, voters switched to elections by the single transferable vote, using it for two elections, before the General Assembly overturned it in 1923. Town Council members are elected at large for two years and represent all of West Hartford, and the town clerk is elected for four years. Appointed by the Town Council in 2022, Rick Ledwith is the Town Manager.

Connecticut municipalities—as with neighboring Massachusetts and Rhode Island—provide nearly all local services (i.e. fire and rescue, education, snow removal, etc.), as county government has been abolished since 1960.

=== State ===
General Assembly Representatives
Representative	Chamber	District	Party
Tammy Exum	House of Representatives	19th	Dem
Kate Farrar	House of Representatives	20th	Dem
(vacant)	House of Representatives	18th	Dem

Connecticut Senate
Representative	Chamber	District	Party
Derek Slap	Senate	5th	Dem

== Infrastructure ==
=== Transportation ===
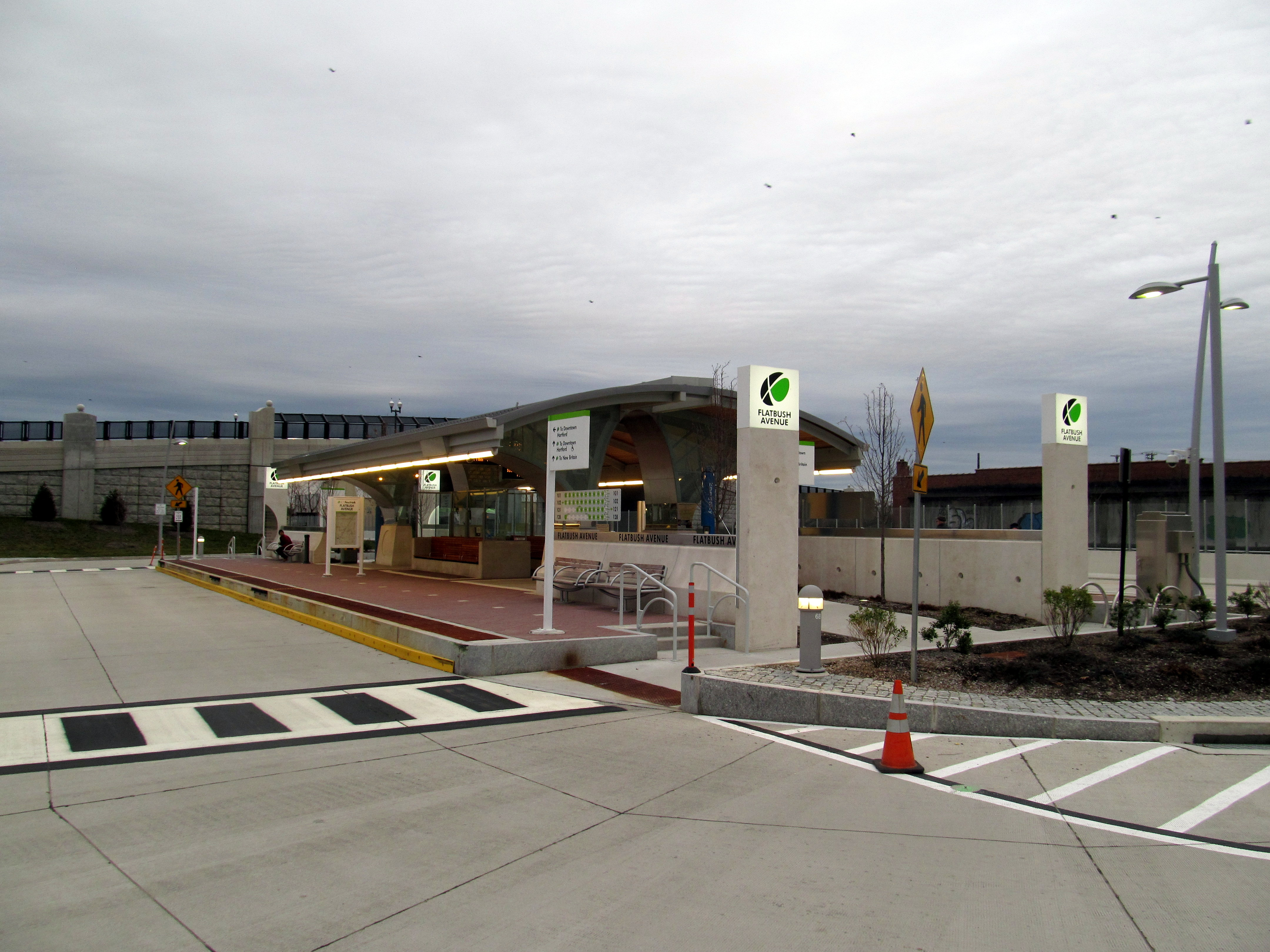
Flatbush Avenue station is currently served by CT Fastrak. There are plans to add a commuter rail stop on the Hartford Line at this station.

==== Railroad ====
West Hartford is a planned stop along the Hartford Line, a commuter rail service from New Haven to Springfield that uses the current Amtrak-owned New Haven–Springfield Line, with a possible shuttle bus connection in Windsor Locks to Bradley International Airport. Service launched on June 16, 2018. The State of Connecticut has secured funding for the construction of a new train station at Flatbush Avenue at the corner of New Park Avenue. In 2019 Governor Lamont's CT2030 transportation investment plan, which included tolling cars and trucks in 14 locations, was soundly rejected by Republicans and Democrats, leaving less funding for rail projects. Currently there is not enough funding to build a rail station in West Hartford.

==== Bus ====
West Hartford is served by several bus routes of Connecticut Transit. Major roads served are Albany Avenue (Route 58), New Britain Avenue (Routes 37, 39, and 128), Park Street (Routes 31 and 33), South/North Main Street (Route 153) Farmington Avenue (Routes 60, 62, 64, and 66), Asylum Avenue (Route 72), Hillside Avenue (Route 63), and Boulevard/South Quaker Lane (Route 69).

==== Bus rapid transit ====
CTfastrak, Connecticut's first bus rapid transit corridor, opened in 2015, providing a separated right-of-way between Hartford and New Britain. West Hartford is served by two stations:

- Elmwood: Corner of New Park Avenue and New Britain Avenue
- Flatbush Avenue: Corner of Flatbush Avenue and New Park Avenue

=== Emergency services ===
==== Fire department ====
The West Hartford fire department operates out of five fire stations, that provide fire protection and emergency medical services at the Advanced life support level.

=== Utilities ===
- Electricity: Eversource Energy
- Water: Metropolitan District Commission
- Natural gas: Connecticut Natural Gas
- Telephone, ADSL/Fiber internet, IPTV television: Frontier Communications
- Cable television/Cable internet: Comcast

== Education ==
=== Public schools ===
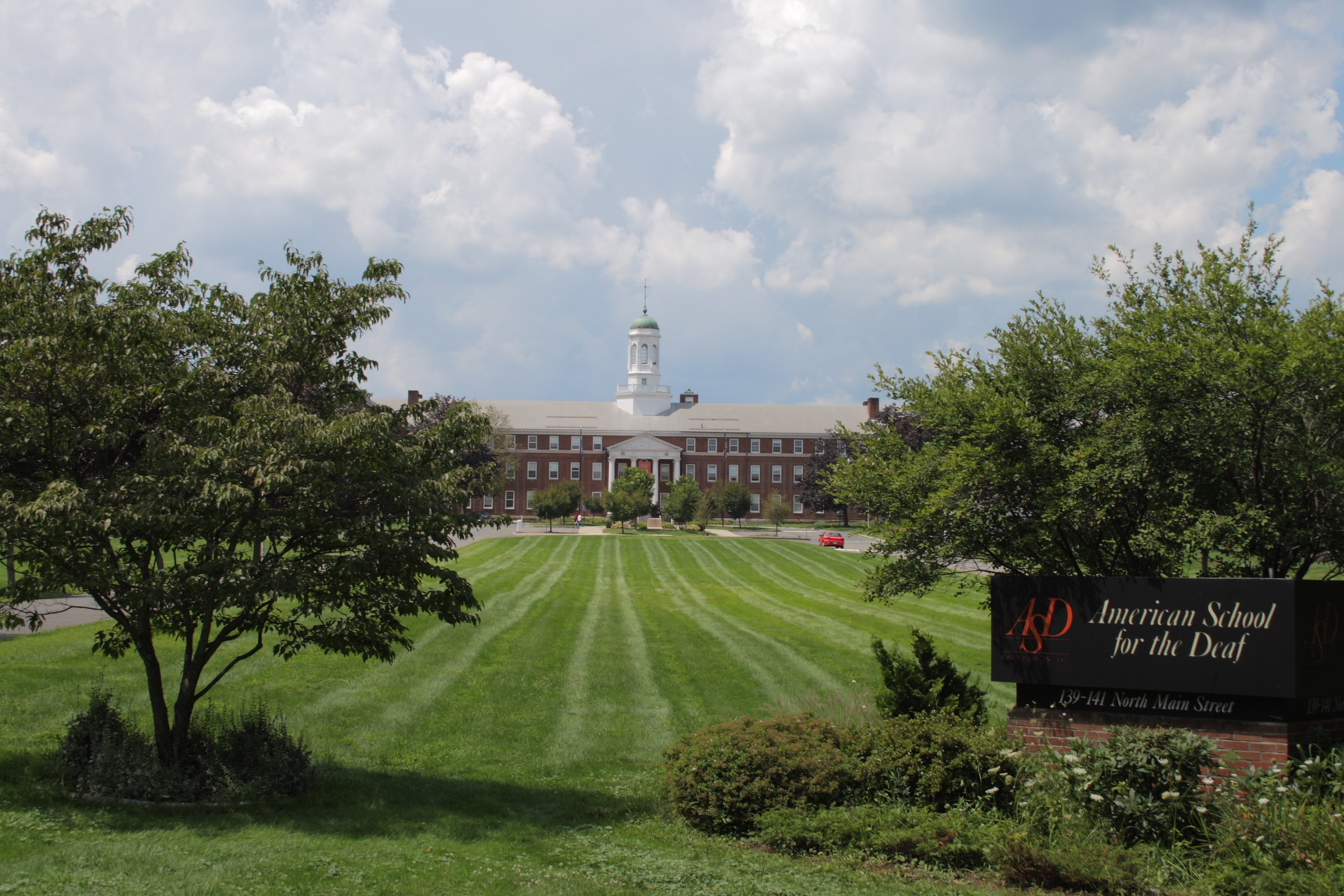
The American School for the Deaf

The town is home to two public high schools, Conard (home of the Conard Red Wolves) and Hall (home of the Hall Titans), as well as 11 elementary schools and three middle schools in the West Hartford Public Schools system. The elementary schools are Aiken, Braeburn, Bugbee, Charter Oak, Duffy, Morley, Norfeldt, Smith, Webster Hill, Whiting Lane and Wolcott. The middle schools are King Philip, Sedgwick, and the newest, Bristow Middle School, on the former site of Kingswood-Oxford Middle School. The elementary schools are evenly distributed to either King Philip or Sedgwick, and those who enroll at Bristow are chosen by lottery. After middle school, students continue on to high school with their same student body. Sedgwick's graduates go to Conard High School, and King Philip's go to Hall. Bristow students return to the school district they were in during elementary school. The two high schools hold many events and recognize the tension between the two high schools.

=== Private schools ===
- Saint Thomas the Apostle School
- Saint Timothy Middle School
- Northwest Catholic High School
- St. Brigid-St. Augustine Partnership School
- American School for the Deaf
- Kingswood Oxford School
- Renbrook School
- New England Jewish Academy
- Solomon Schechter Day School of Greater Hartford
- German School of Connecticut

=== Colleges and universities ===
Institutions of higher learning in the town include:

- University of Hartford
- University of Saint Joseph

The University of Connecticut Greater Hartford Campus was formerly located in West Hartford adjacent to the University of Saint Joseph campus, however it was moved to downtown Hartford in 2017.

== Military ==
The 76th Infantry Division was a unit of the United States Army in World War I, World War II and the Cold War. The 76th Division was reconstituted in October 1946 and reactivated in November of that year as a part of the Organized Reserve, and was headquartered in West Hartford, Connecticut. Units of the division were spread throughout the six New England states. The 405th Army Hospital Unit took over the South Quaker lane facility in 1996.

== Media ==
Print

- The Jewish Ledger, weekly newspaper
- West Hartford Life, monthly newspaper
- West Hartford News, weekly newspaper
- West Hartford Press, weekly newspaper

Radio

- WNWW
- WWUH
- WNPR

TV

- West Hartford Community Television (WHCTV)
- WVIT

== Notable people ==
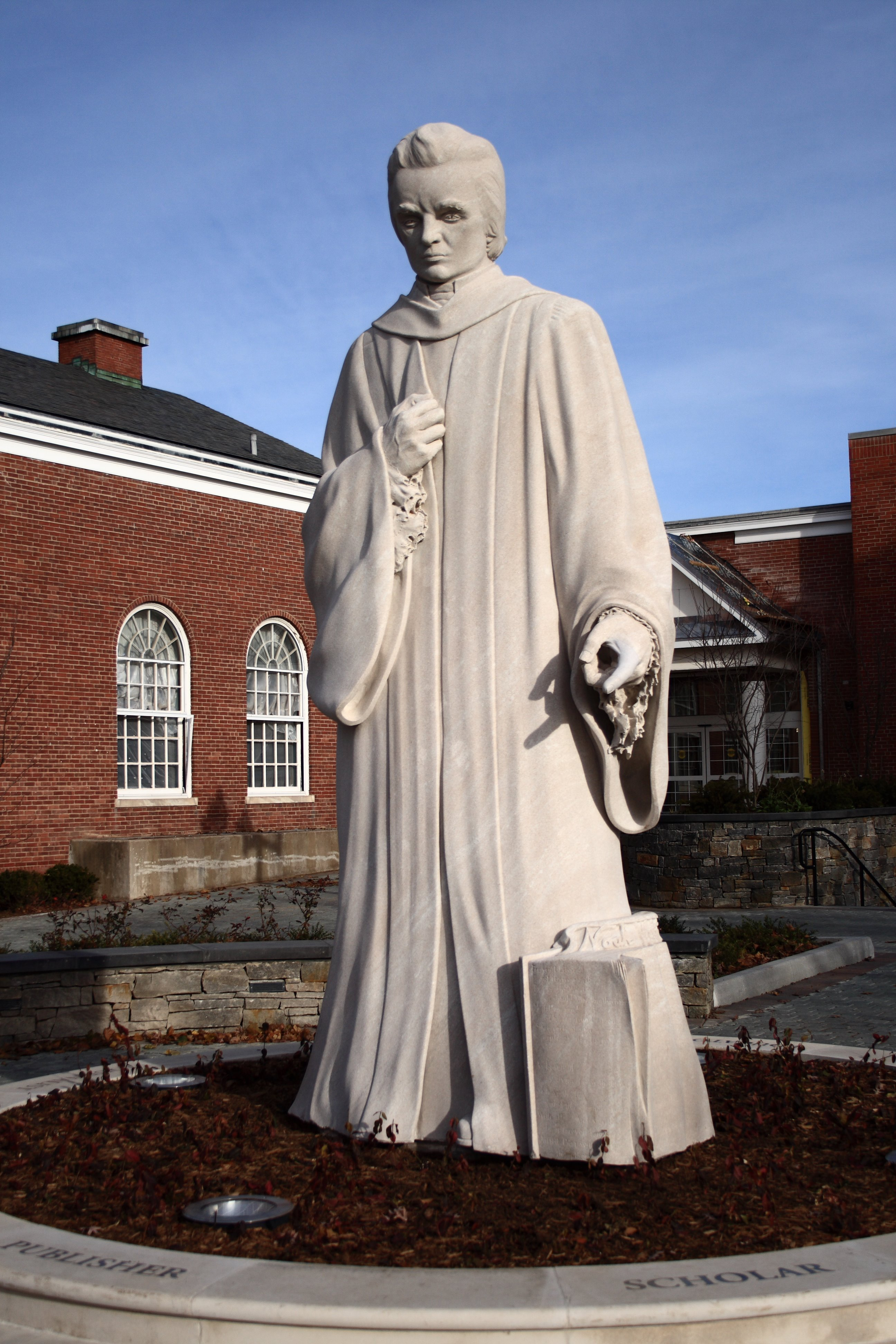
Noah Webster statue in West Hartford Center in front of the public library, created by West Hartford sculptor Korczak Ziółkowski. One mile (1.6 km) to the south is the Noah Webster House, where Webster was born in 1758.

In alphabetical order by last names:

- Chip Arndt, gay rights activist, philanthropist, and co-winner of The Amazing Race 4
- Stephen Barnett (1935–2009), legal scholar who opposed the Newspaper Preservation Act of 1970
- E. Alexander Bergstrom (1919–1973), conservationist
- Manute Bol (1962–2010), NBA player
- Ben Bova, science fact and fiction author
- Tim Brennan, guitar player and songwriter for Dropkick Murphys
- Chris Carrabba, singer–songwriter from Dashboard Confessional
- Joe Courtney, U.S. representative for Connecticut
- John Droney, politician and lawyer
- Dominick Dunne (1925–2009) and John Gregory Dunne, (1932–2003), writers, were born in Hartford and grew up in West Hartford
- John Franklin Enders, Nobel Laureate 1954 for Medicine
- Abraham J. Feldman (1893–1977), rabbi
- John L. Flannery, chairman & CEO, General Electric (GE)
- Kate E. Griswold (1860–1923), editor, publisher
- Martin Hayes, Six Time All Ireland Fiddle Champion
- Lemuel Haynes, clergyman, first African American to be ordained
- Katharine Houghton Hepburn (1878–1951), social activist
- Grayson Hugh (singer-songwriter), songs featured in Oscar-winning films Thelma and Louise and Fried Green Tomatoes
- Liz Janangelo, professional golfer on the LPGA Tour
- Jared Jordan, drafted 45th by Los Angeles Clippers in the 2007 NBA Draft
- Steven A. Kandarian, was the president, chairman, and chief executive officer of MetLife.
- Charlie Kaufman, Academy Award winner and screenwriter of Being John Malkovich and Eternal Sunshine of the Spotless Mind
- Joan R. Kemler, state representative and the first woman to serve as Connecticut State Treasurer (1986–1987)
- Edward Lorenz, mathematician and meteorologist, early pioneer of chaos theory, inventor of the strange attractor notion, made the term "butterfly effect" popular
- Frank Luntz, Republican pollster
- Kenny Mayne, ESPN personality
- Joseph Mascolo, actor and soap opera veteran
- Brett H. McGurk, Special Adviser to the United States Ambassador to Iraq
- Brad Mehldau, jazz pianist, composer and arranger
- Alex Mighten, professional soccer player for Nottingham Forest in Nottingham, UK
- Edward Morley, namesake of Morley Elementary School, scientist best known for the Michelson–Morley experiment
- John O'Hurley, actor on Seinfeld television series and former Family Feud host
- Peter Paige, actor
- Owen Painter, actor best known as Isaac Night / Slurp in the Netflix series Wednesday
- Miles S. Rapoport, state representative and Secretary of the State of Connecticut (1995–1999)
- John P. Reese, money manager and financial columnist
- Ryen Russillo, ESPN personality
- Michael Schur, creator of Parks and Recreation and The Good Place
- William Thompson Sedgwick, professor at the Massachusetts Institute of Technology and a key figure in shaping U.S. public health
- Scott Van Pelt, ESPN personality
- Kyle Wallack, head hockey coach at Albertus Magnus College
- Noah Webster, lexicographer, textbook author, Bible translator, spelling reformer, writer, and editor
- John Woodruff, congressman
- Gregory S. Woodward, president of the University of Hartford
- Korczak Ziolkowski (1908–1982), sculptor of Crazy Horse Memorial in South Dakota

== Points of interest ==
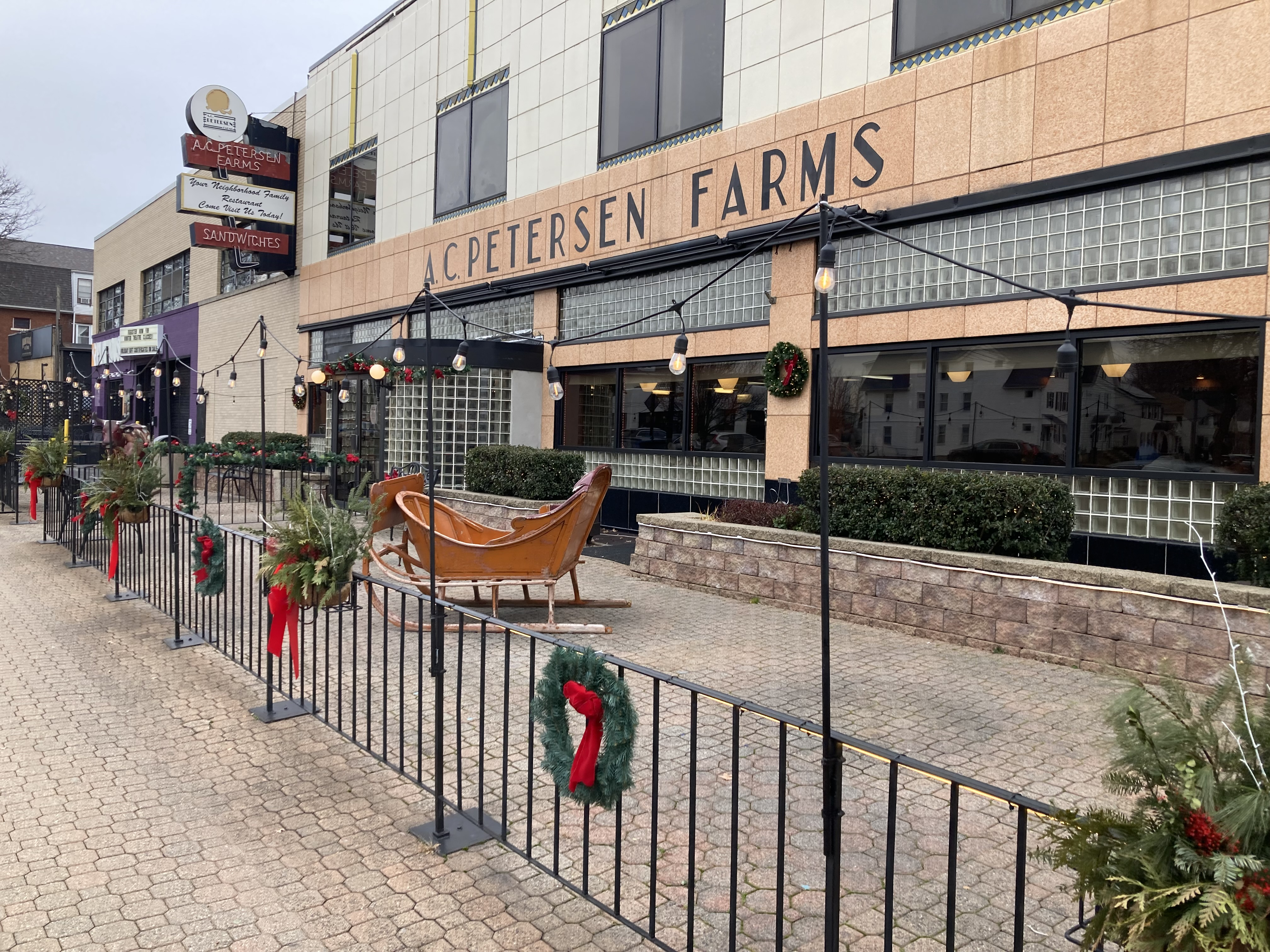
AC Petersen Farms restaurant on Park Road, with Playhouse on Park in the background

- Bishops Corner
- Blue Back Square
- Elizabeth Park
- Elmwood
- Fern Park
- Noah Webster House
- Park Road
- West Hartford Center
- West Hartford Reservoir
- Westfarms Mall
- Westmoor Park

== See also ==
- National Register of Historic Places listings in West Hartford, Connecticut
