= Bishops Corner, West Hartford =

Bishops Corner
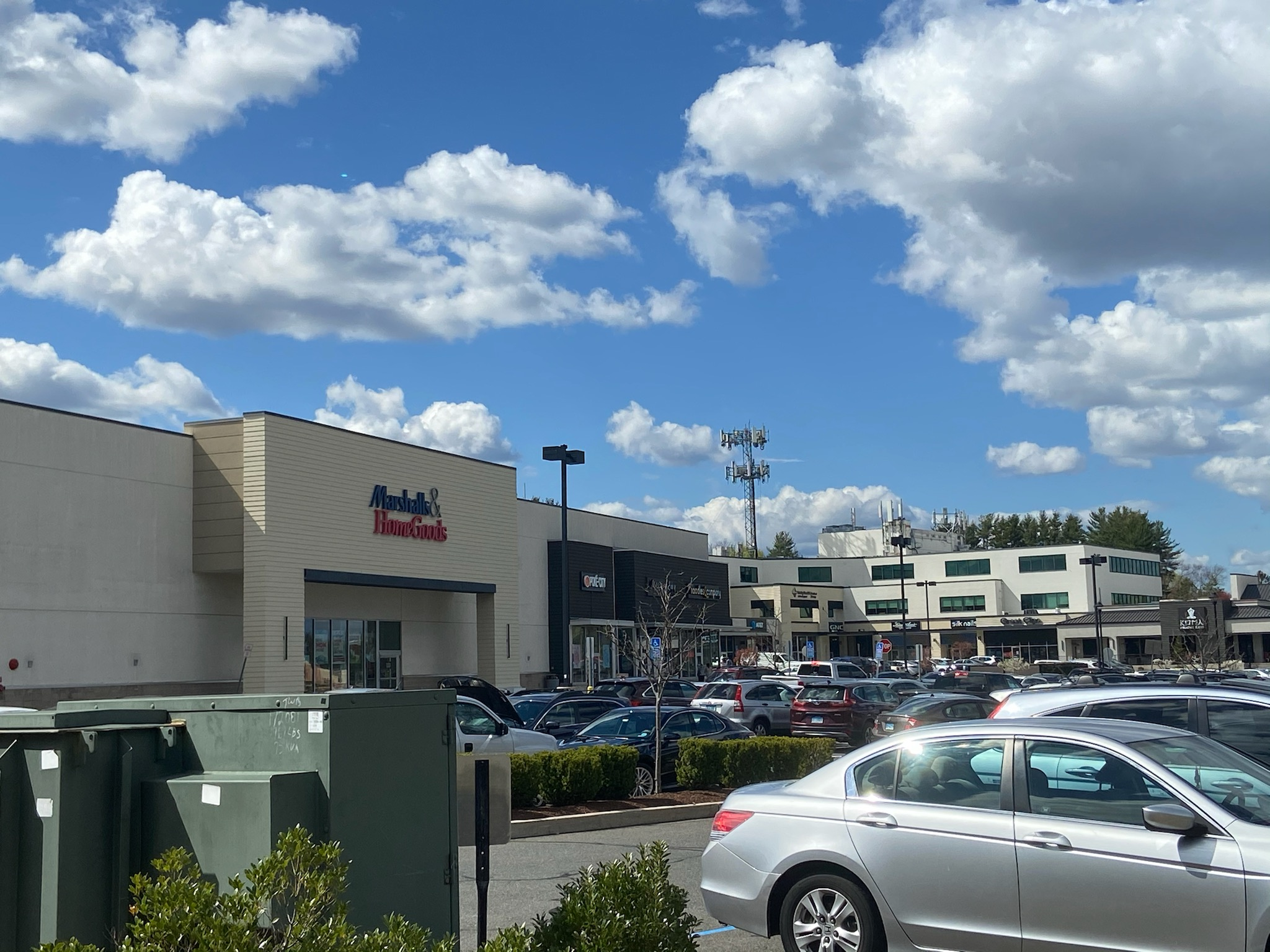
- Bishops Corner (2021)
- Location: West Hartford, Connecticut, United States
- Coordinates: 41.786°N 72.747°W
- Owner: First National Reality Partners
- Num. of stores: 45+

Bishops Corner is retail location in West Hartford, Connecticut, United States, at the crossroads of Albany Avenue (U.S. Route 44) and North Main Street.

== History ==
The area, which was named for tobacco farmer Joseph Bishop, who lived in the area, became a business center after 1797 because of the busy Talcott Mountain Turnpike (now U.S. Route 44). A tavern also became the location of West Hartford's first post office here in 1820.

A popular local restaurant/dairy bar named Dutchland Farms was located at the site where development began on a Lord & Taylor department store in 1953, which opened in April of 1954. It was the first Lord & Taylor store outside of the New York metropolitan area. This store anchored the first of the four strip plazas located on each corner of the intersection. That store closed in 1974 when it moved to Westfarms. It was then home to a Caldor store.

The Crown Supermarket, which opened at Bishops Corner in 1968, was voted number 1 in 1981 by the Progressive Grocer magazine in its size and category (independently owned grocery store).

A small-format Target store that currently anchors Bishops Corner opened in 2019.

In 2023, the last McDonald's in West Hartford was closed in Bishops Corner.

== Public Library ==
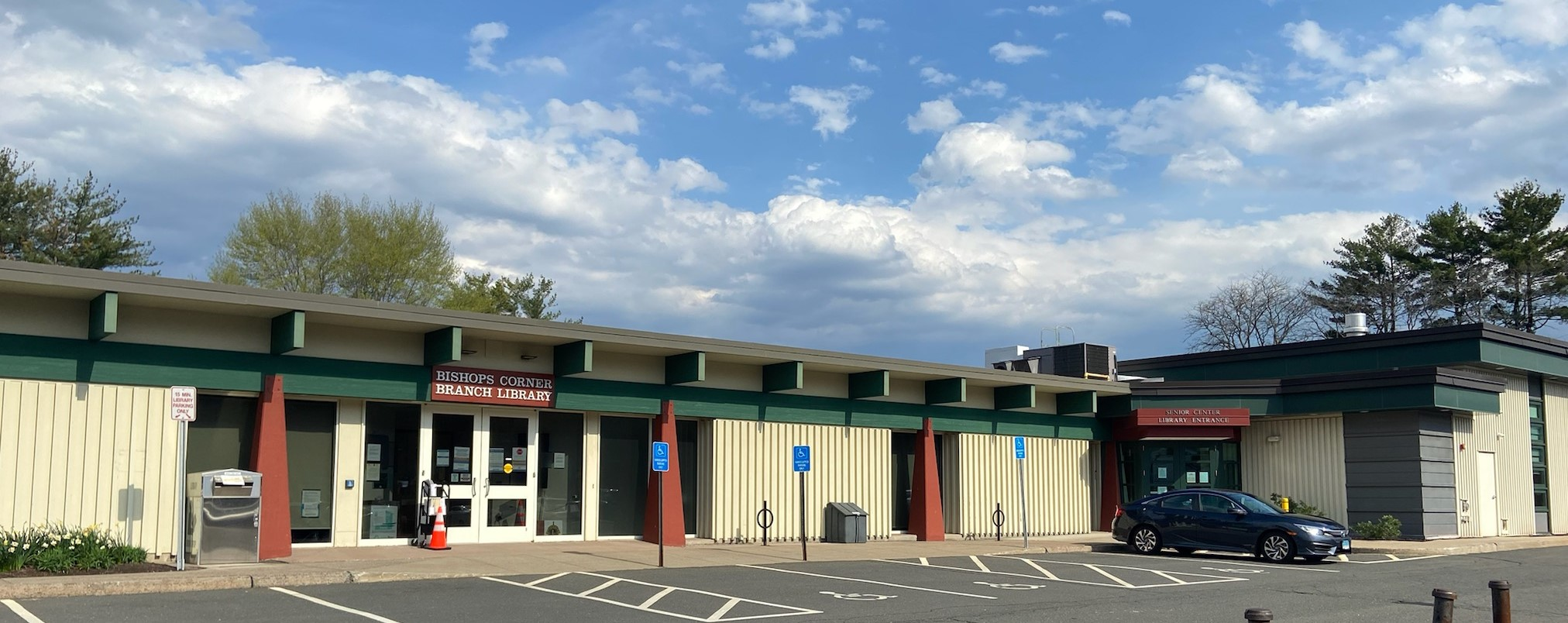
Bishops Corner Branch of the West Hartford Public Library and Senior Center

The Bishops Corner Branch Library opened in 1966.
