= Elmwood station (Connecticut) =

Elmwood
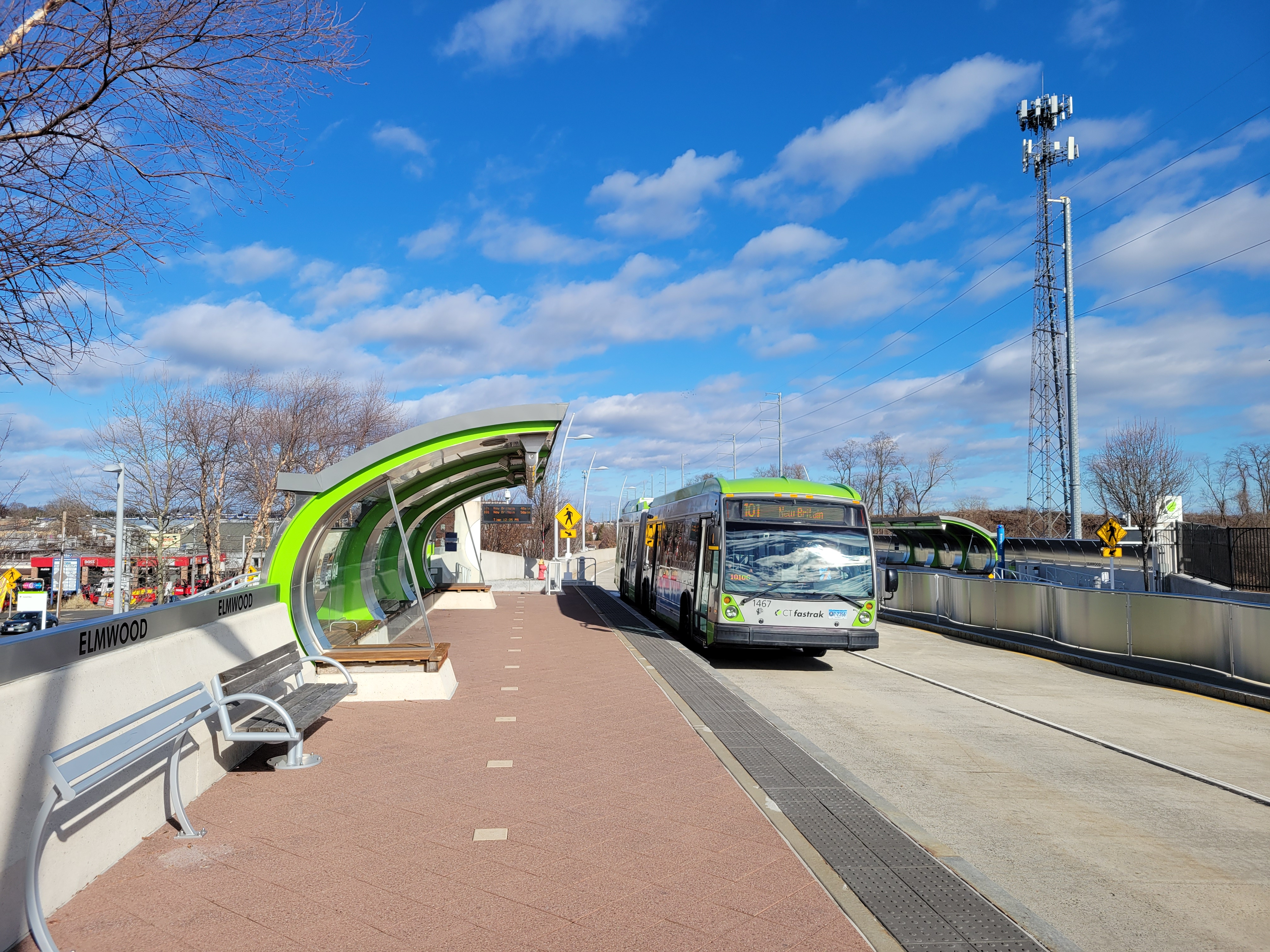
- A southbound bus at Elmwood station in January 2024

General information
- Location: New Park and New Britain Avenues; West Hartford, Connecticut
- Coordinates: 41.7307°N 72.7249°W
- Owner: ConnDOT
- Operator: Connecticut Transit
- Bus routes: 101, 102, 121
- Bus stands: 2 side platforms
- Connections: 128 (on New Park Avenue)

Construction
- Cycle facilities: Yes
- Accessible: Yes

History
- Opened: March 28, 2015

Services
Preceding station	CT Transit	Following station
Newington Junction toward Downtown New Britain	CT Fastrak	Flatbush Avenue toward Hartford
Location

Elmwood is a bus rapid transit station on the CTfastrak line, located near the intersection of New Britain Avenue (CT-529) and New Park Avenue in West Hartford, Connecticut. It opened with the line on March 28, 2015. The station consists of two side platforms serving the busway, with two center passing lanes to allow express buses to pass buses stopped at the station.

== Railroad history ==
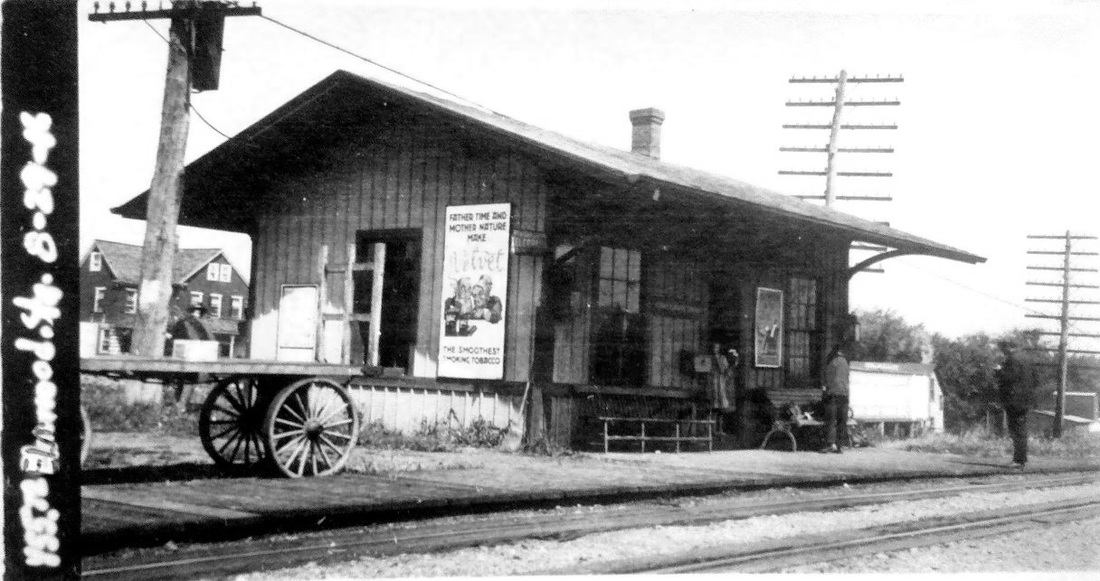
1916 valuation image of Elmwood railroad station

The New York and New England Railroad (and predecessor Hartford, Providence and Fishkill Railroad) served a station approximately at the modern location. It opened around 1850 as West Hartford and was renamed to Elmwood in 1874. It may have been served until the end of passenger service between Hartford and New Britain in 1959. Trains using the parallel Springfield Line, originally built by the Hartford and New Haven Railroad, did not stop at Elmwood.
