= Westfarms =

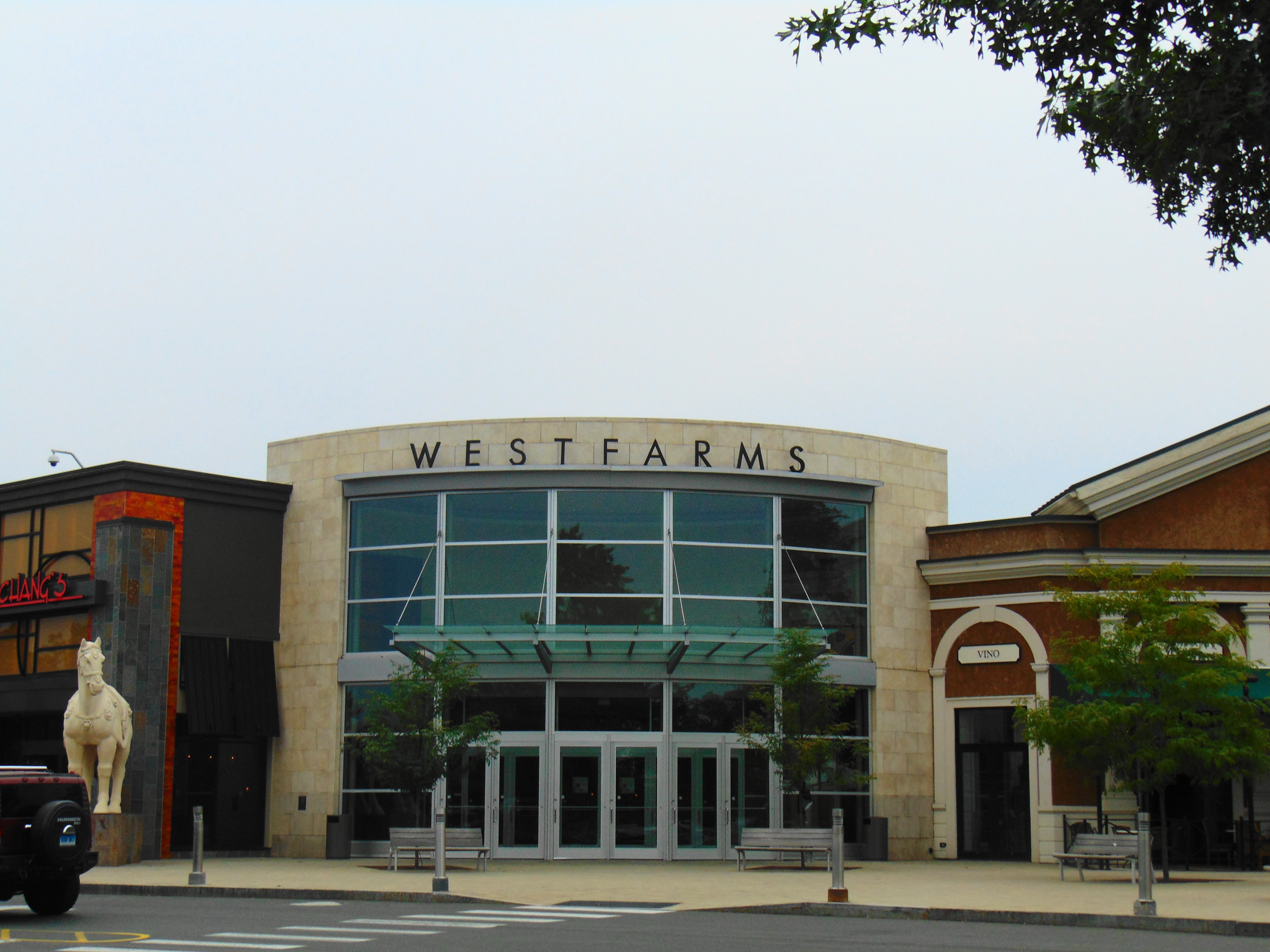
- Exterior of main entrance (2018)

General information
- Status: In operation
- Type: Shopping mall
- Location: 1500 New Britain Avenue, West Hartford, Connecticut, United States
- Coordinates: 41°43′22″N 72°45′48″W
- Opened: October 14, 1974; 52 years ago
- Renovated: 1982; 1995–1997; 2008–2009
- Owner: Simon Property Group
- Operator: Simon Property Group

Technical details
- Floor count: 2
- Floor area: 1,267,000 square feet (117,700 m^{2}) of gross leasable area

Design and construction
- Developer: Taubman Centers

Other information
- Number of stores: 150
- Number of anchors: 5

Website
- simon.com/mall/westfarms

Westfarms is a shopping mall on the West Hartford–Farmington town line in the U.S. state of Connecticut. It is owned and managed by Simon Property Group, which acquired original developer Taubman Centers in 2025.

The mall was opened in 1974, expanded in 1982 and 1995–1997, and remodeled in 2008–2009. With 1,267,000 square feet (117,700 m^{2}) of gross leasable area, Westfarms is the third-largest mall in Connecticut. It is located on Route 71, off the I-84 and Route 9 junction and near several open-air shopping plazas.

== History ==
Westfarms opened in 1974. It was developed by Bloomfield Hills-based Taubman Centers, which remains in charge of its management since then. Its original anchors were G. Fox & Co., JCPenney, and Sage-Allen. The mall was expanded with a new retail wing in 1982, which included a Lord & Taylor store.

Hartford-based G. Fox was acquired by Boston-based Filene's in 1992, and the Westfarms store was rebranded on January 30, 1993. Sage-Allen filed for Chapter 11 bankruptcy in 1992, and closed permanently in 1993. Facing competition from the newer Buckland Hills Mall in nearby Manchester, Taubman began a USD $100-million renovation and expansion of Westfarms in 1995. In the first phase, Filene's and Lord & Taylor were remodeled, and the vacated Sage-Allen space became a Filene's Men's & Home. A four-level parking garage was built in the second phase in 1996, and a new retail wing between J. C. Penney and Lord & Taylor with two additional parking garages was completed in 1997. The wing is anchored by Seattle-based Nordstrom, which opened on September 6, 1997. It was the first Nordstrom in New England and remained their only store in Connecticut until The SoNo Collection in Norwalk opened in 2019.

On September 9, 2006, Filene's became Macy's.

In August 2020, it was announced that all Lord & Taylor stores would close, as a result of the economic impact of the COVID-19 pandemic. Jordan's Furniture opened in the space in 2023.

The mall is owned and managed by Simon Property Group, which acquired original developer Taubman.

== Architecture ==
Unlike many enclosed malls, Westfarms does not feature a common-area food court, but some wings of the mall contain several quick service restaurants that are housed in their own storefronts.

== Gallery ==
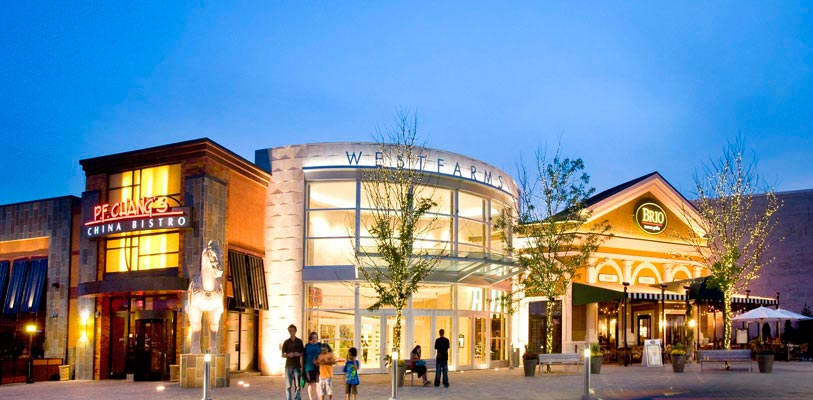
Entrance to Westfarms

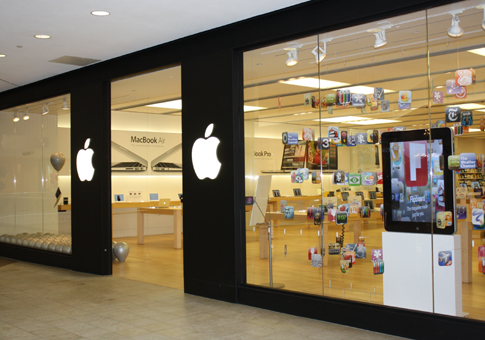
Apple Store for consumer electronics

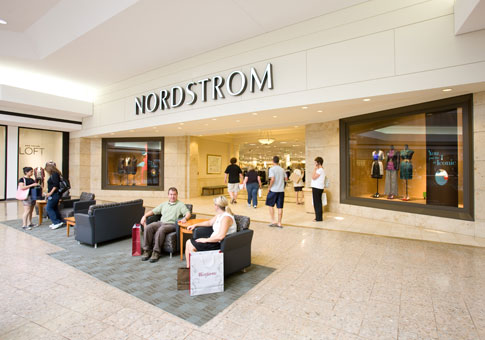
Nordstrom department store

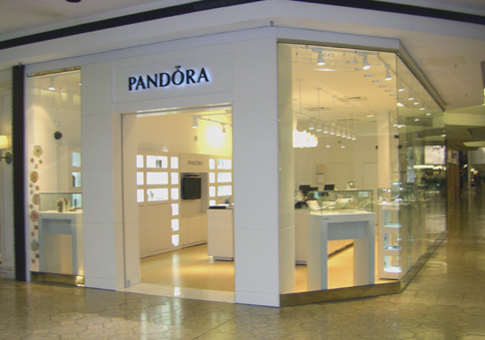
Pandora jewelry store

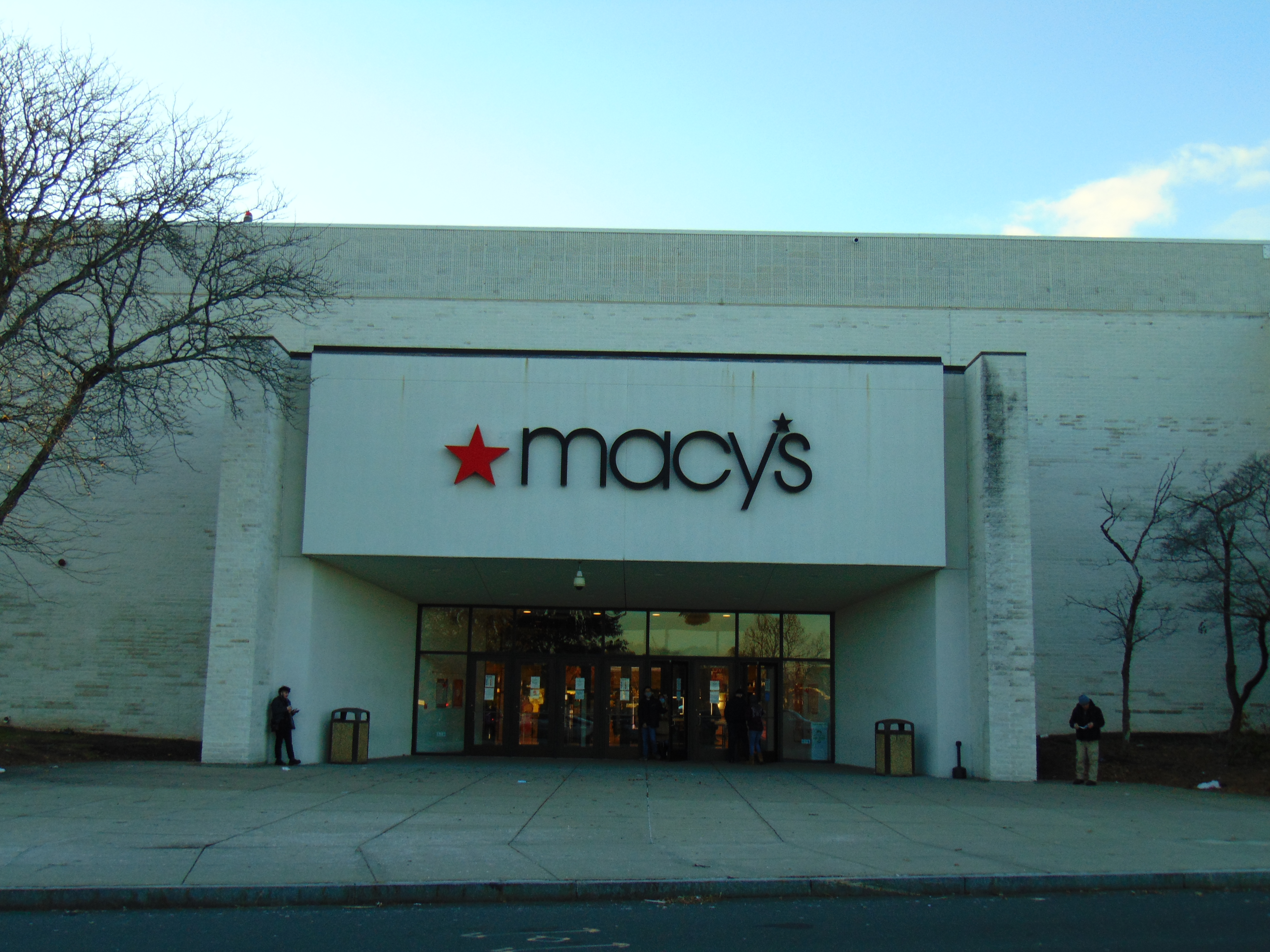
Macy's department store
