= Blue Back Square =

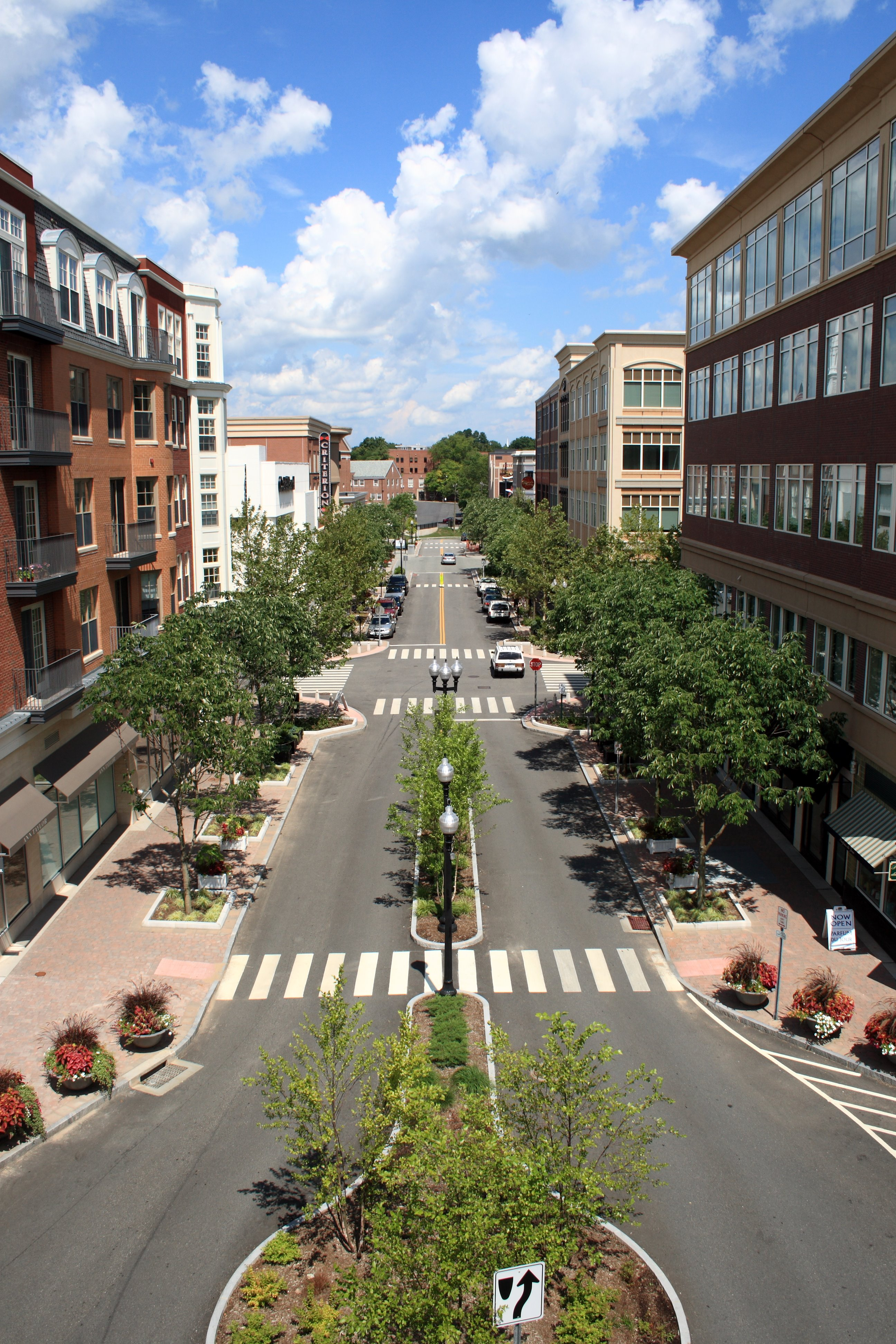
- Coordinates: 41°45′37″N 72°44′24″W
- Address: 65 Memorial Road, West Hartford, CT 06107
- Manager: Charter Realty & Development
- Owner: Charter Realty & Development
- Website: https://www.bluebacksquare.com

Blue Back Square is a mixed-use, downtown destination development located in West Hartford, Connecticut. Blue Back Square is a shopping, living, dining, and entertainment destination and is home to 120 residences, 250,000 SF of commercial and office space and merchants including Crate & Barrel, West Elm, Barnes & Noble and The Cheesecake Factory. It is adjacent to Whole Foods Market and Delamar Hotel.

Talk of the new square started in 2003, with construction from late 2006 to early 2008. Blue Back Square was named after the "Blue-backed Speller," an educational book by Noah Webster, who was once a West Hartford resident.

== Controversy ==
When the project was first introduced, controversy arose over the transfer of town land for the project as well as the issuance of bonds. Land that was proposed for transfer for the development included open space behind Town Hall and the former Board of Education building. The town decided to have a referendum to settle the matter after a petition campaign was mounted to force a vote. In a two-question referendum, one on the issuance of bonds and the other regarding the land transfer, town residents approved the project, with about 60 percent in favor and 40 percent opposed.

== Mural ==
On June 19, 2021 - Juneteenth - West Hartford dedicated a new mural devoted to African-American history and life, both locally and nationally. The mural is located on an exterior wall of the Noah Webster Memorial Library (1917 building) and was painted by Corey Pane. One panel of the mural includes Ella Baker, Martin Luther King Jr., and Bernard Lafayette over a quotation from Amanda Gorman.

Facing Main Street, another panel includes Gertrude Blanks, Judy Casperson, and State Rep. Tammy Exum over a quotation from US Vice-President Kamala Harris.

In 2022, more murals were designed at the property with local artists from RiseUP Connecticut on Raymond Road, Memorial Road, and Isham Road.

== Images ==
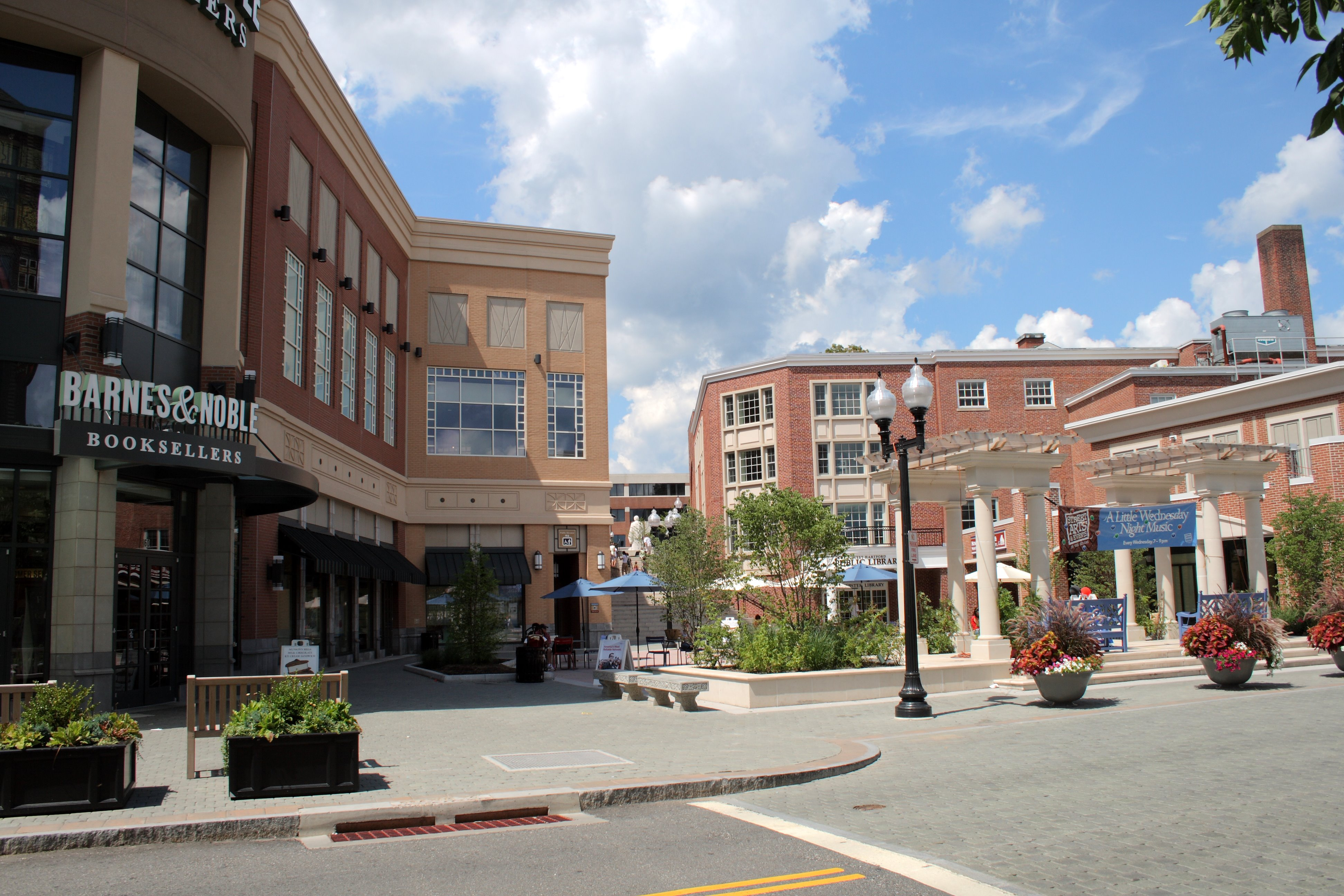

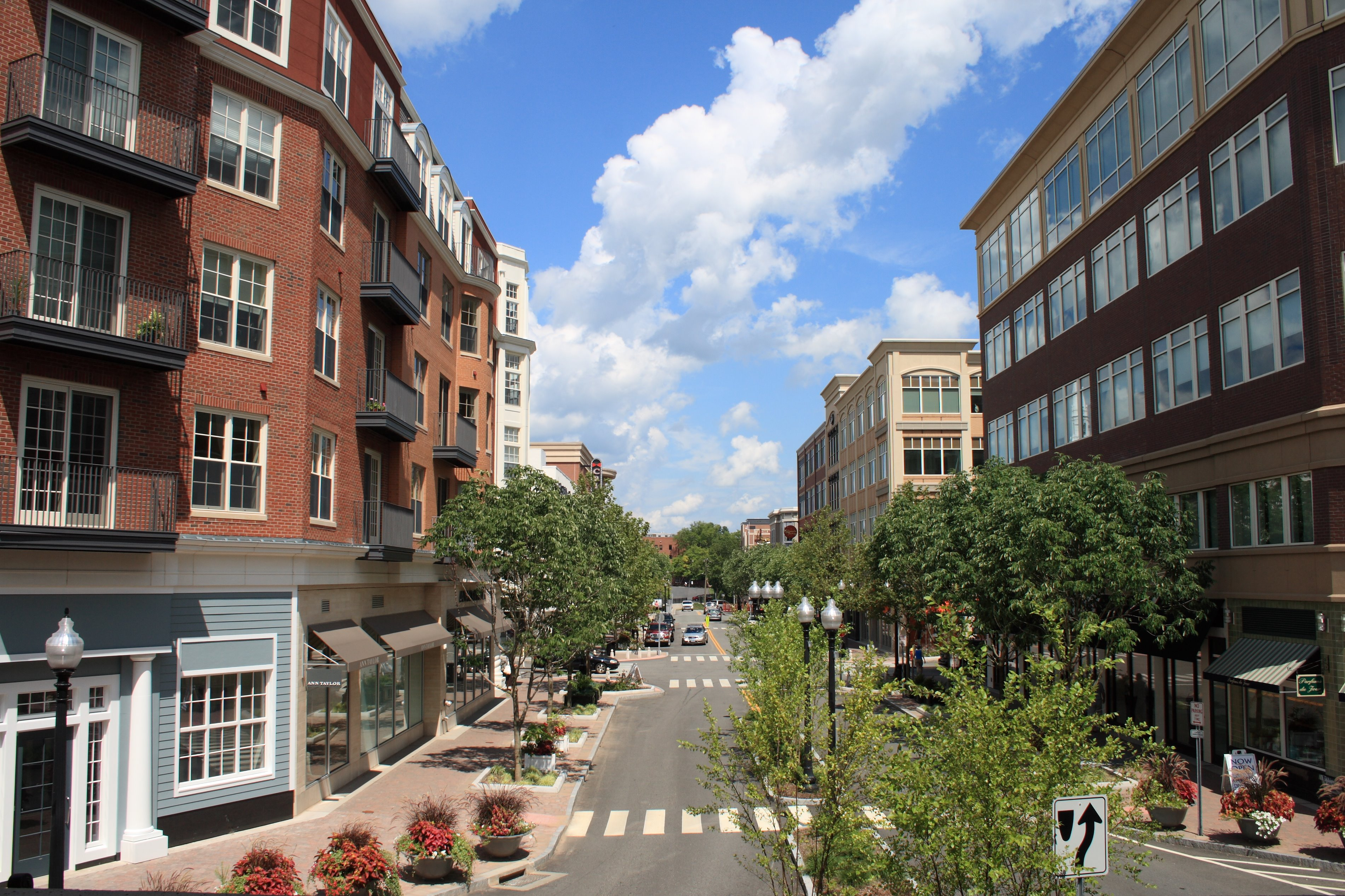

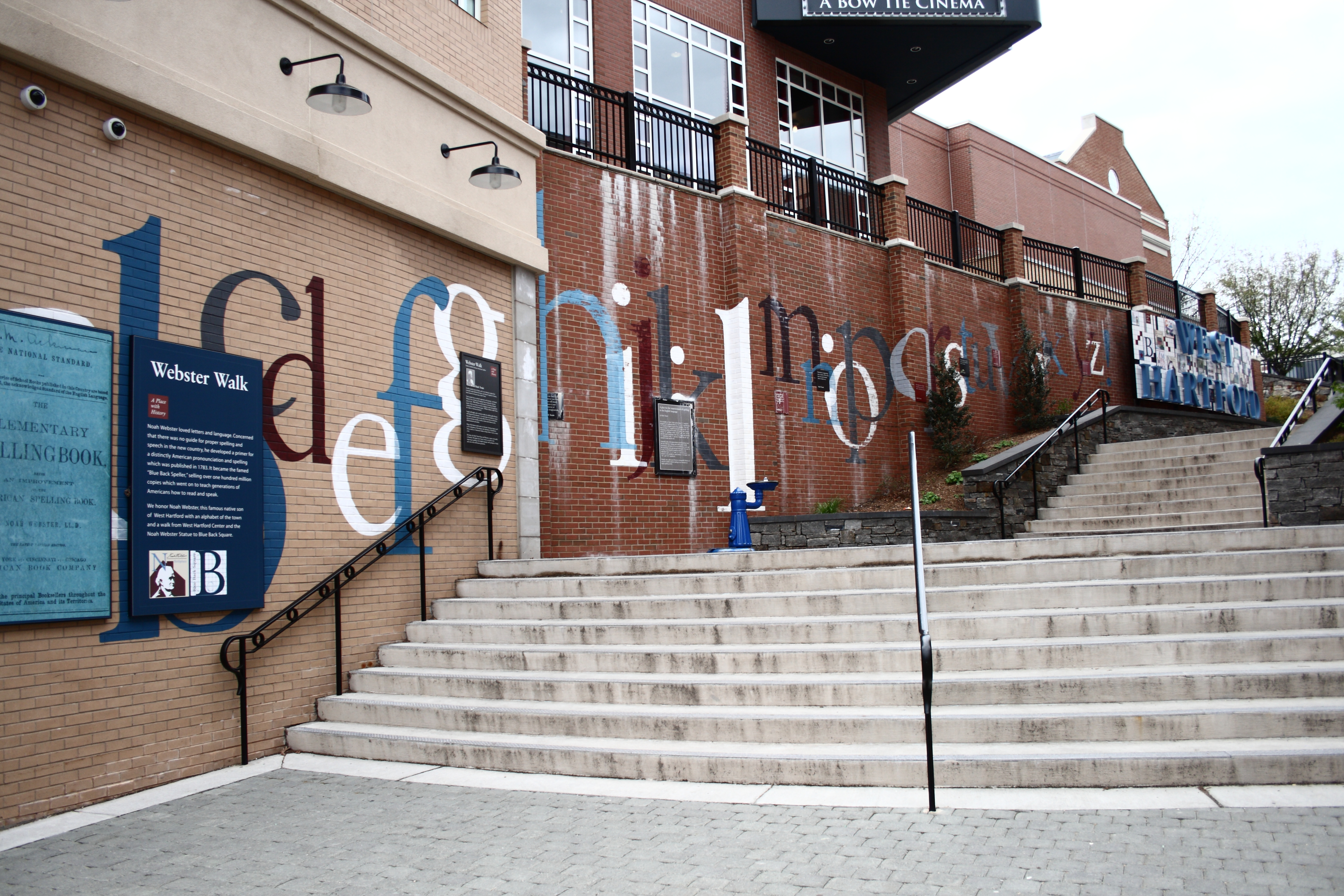
Blue-backed Speller imagery decorating Blue Back Square
