= Waterfall =

Point in a river or brook where water flows over a vertical drop

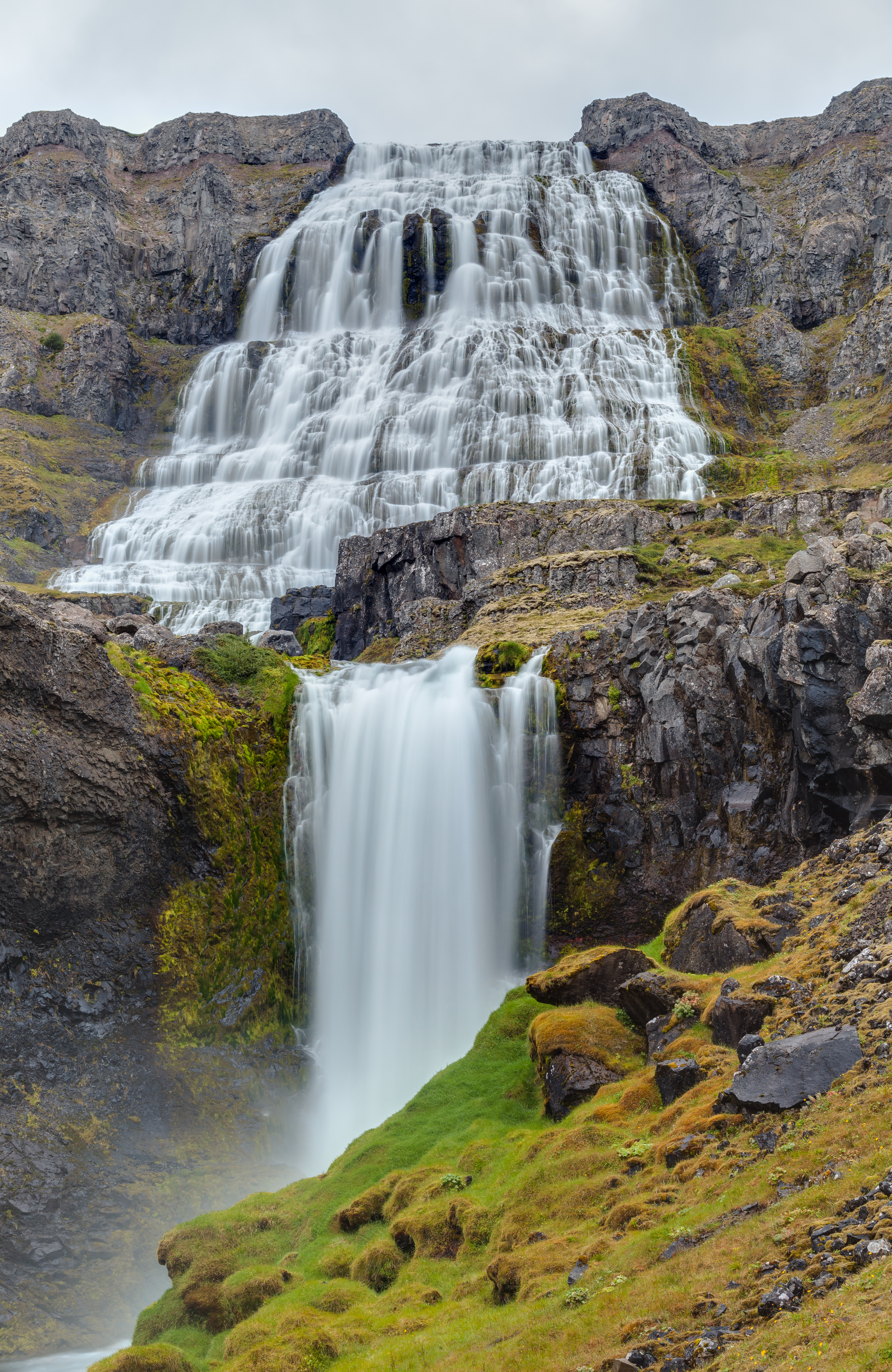
Dynjandi, a series of waterfalls located in the Westfjords (Vestfirðir), Iceland.

A waterfall is any point in a river or stream where water flows over a vertical drop or a series of steep drops. Waterfalls also occur where meltwater drops over the edge of a tabular iceberg or ice shelf. Waterfalls can be formed in several ways, but the most common method of formation is that a river courses over a top layer of resistant bedrock before falling onto softer rock, which erodes faster, leading to an increasingly high fall. Waterfalls have been studied for their impact on species living in and around them.

Humans have had a distinct relationship with waterfalls since prehistory, travelling to see them, exploring and naming them. They can present formidable barriers to navigation along rivers. Waterfalls are religious sites in many cultures. Since the 18th century, they have received increased attention as tourist destinations, sources of hydropower, and—particularly since the mid-20th century—as subjects of research.

== Definition and terminology ==
A waterfall is generally defined as a point in a river where water flows over a steep drop that is close to or directly vertical. In 2000 Mabin specified that "The horizontal distance between the positions of the lip and plunge pool should be no more than 25% of the waterfall height." There are various types and methods to classify waterfalls. Some scholars have included rapids as a subsection. What actually constitutes a waterfall continues to be debated.

Waterfalls are sometimes interchangeably referred to as "cascades" and "cataracts", though some sources specify a cataract as being a larger and more powerful waterfall and a cascade as being smaller. A plunge pool is a type of stream pool formed at the bottom of a waterfall. A waterfall may also be referred to as a "foss" or "force".

== Formation ==
Formation of a waterfall

Natural waterfalls are commonly formed in the upper course of a river where lakes flow into valleys in steep mountains.

A river sometimes flows over a large step in the rocks that may have been formed by a fault line. Waterfalls can occur along the edge of a glacial trough, where a stream or river flowing into a glacier continues to flow into a valley after the glacier has receded or melted. The large waterfalls in Yosemite Valley are examples of this phenomenon, which is referred to as a hanging valley. Another reason hanging valleys may form is where two rivers join and one is flowing faster than the other.

When warm and cold water meets by a gorge in the ocean, large underwater waterfalls can form as the cold water rushes to the bottom.

A waterfall is usually defined as being at least five feet high, although most are higher. Mill Pond Falls, in Newington, Connecticut, 12 feet (3.7 m) high, is claimed to be the smallest natural waterfall in the United States. Some sources use a minimum height of 20 feet (6.1 m). A glossary of waterfall terms was published in 1996. There are many different types of waterfalls.

- Combination
- Cascade
- Cataract
- Ledge
- Block / Sheet
- Classical
- Curtain
- Overhanging Ledge
- Plunge / Vertical
- Punchbowl
- Chute
- Fan
- Horsetail
- Parallel / Twin
- Ribbon
- Scree / Talus
- Segmented
- Slide
- Slot / Keyhole
- Tiered / Staircase / Multi-Stepped
- Veil
- Frozen
- Dry / Historic

=== Caprock model ===
The caprock model of waterfall formation states that the river courses over resistant bedrock, erosion happens slowly and is dominated by impacts of water-borne sediment on the rock, while downstream the erosion occurs more rapidly. As the watercourse increases its velocity at the edge of the waterfall, it may pluck material from the riverbed, if the bed is fractured or otherwise more erodible. Hydraulic jets and hydraulic jumps at the toe of a falls can generate large forces to erode the bed, especially when forces are amplified by water-borne sediment. Horseshoe-shaped falls focus the erosion to a central point, also enhancing riverbed change below a waterfall.

A process known as "potholing" involves local erosion of a potentially deep hole in bedrock due to turbulent whirlpools spinning stones around on the bed, drilling it out. Sand and stones carried by the watercourse therefore increase erosion capacity. This causes the waterfall to carve deeper into the bed and to recede upstream. Often over time, the waterfall will recede back to form a canyon or gorge downstream as it recedes upstream, and it will carve deeper into the ridge above it. The rate of retreat for a waterfall can be as high as one-and-a-half metres per year.

Often, the rock stratum just below the more resistant shelf will be of a softer type, meaning that undercutting due to splashback will occur here to form a shallow cave-like formation known as a rock shelter under and behind the waterfall. Eventually, the outcropping, more resistant cap rock will collapse under pressure to add blocks of rock to the base of the waterfall. These blocks of rock are then broken down into smaller boulders by attrition as they collide with each other, and they also erode the base of the waterfall by abrasion, creating a deep plunge pool in the gorge downstream.

Streams can become wider and shallower just above waterfalls due to flowing over the rock shelf, and there is usually a deep area just below the waterfall because of the kinetic energy of the water hitting the bottom. However, a study of waterfalls systematics reported that waterfalls can be wider or narrower above or below a falls, so almost anything is possible given the right geological and hydrological setting. Waterfalls normally form in a rocky area due to erosion. After a long period of being fully formed, the water falling off the ledge will retreat, causing a horizontal pit parallel to the waterfall wall. Eventually, as the pit grows deeper, the waterfall collapses to be replaced by a steeply sloping stretch of river bed. In addition to gradual processes such as erosion, earth movement caused by earthquakes or landslides or volcanoes can lead to the formation of waterfalls.

== Ecology ==
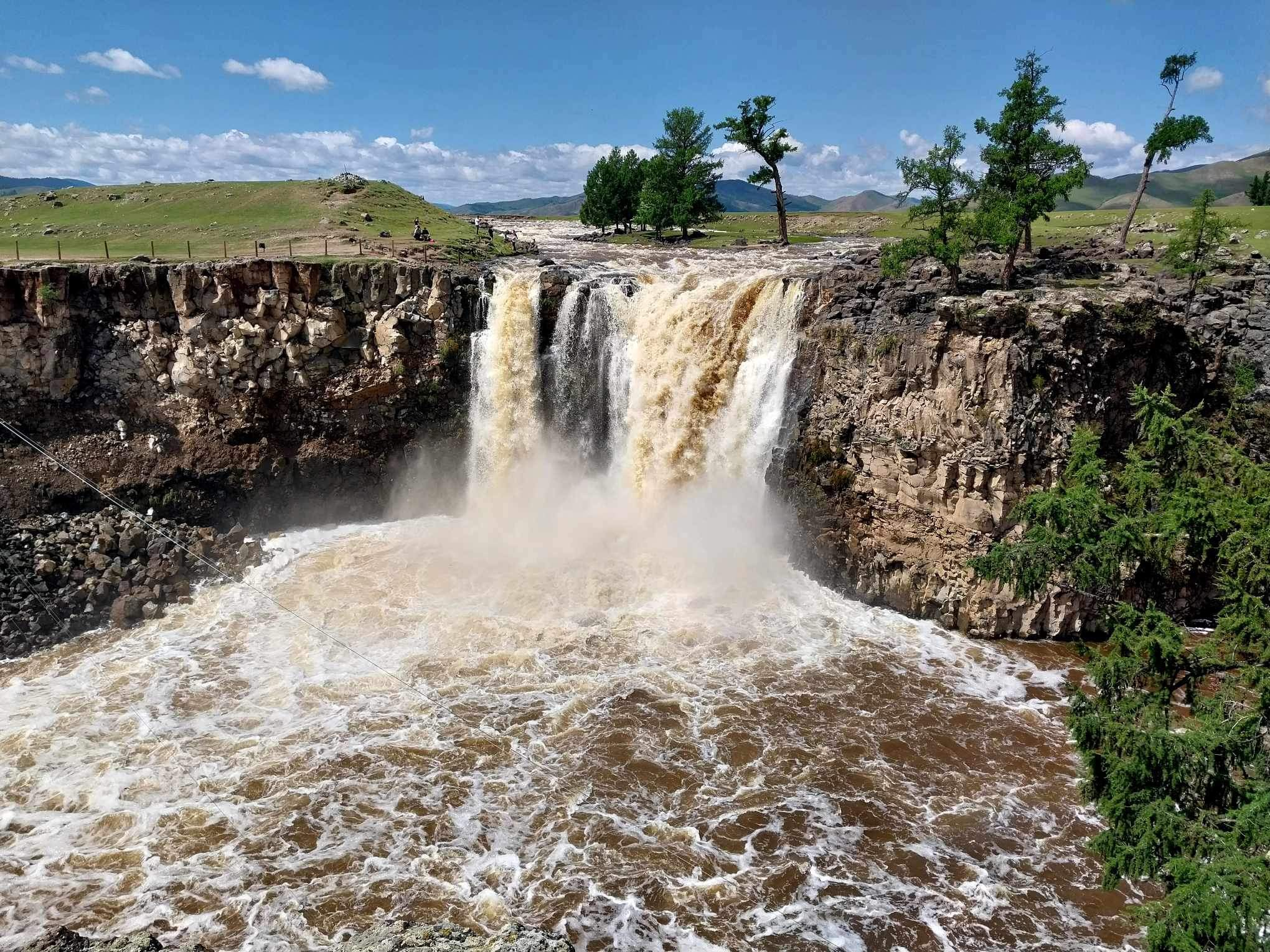
Ulaan tsutgalan in Mongolia During Summer 2023, the background is showing more geological structures formations and farther geological features

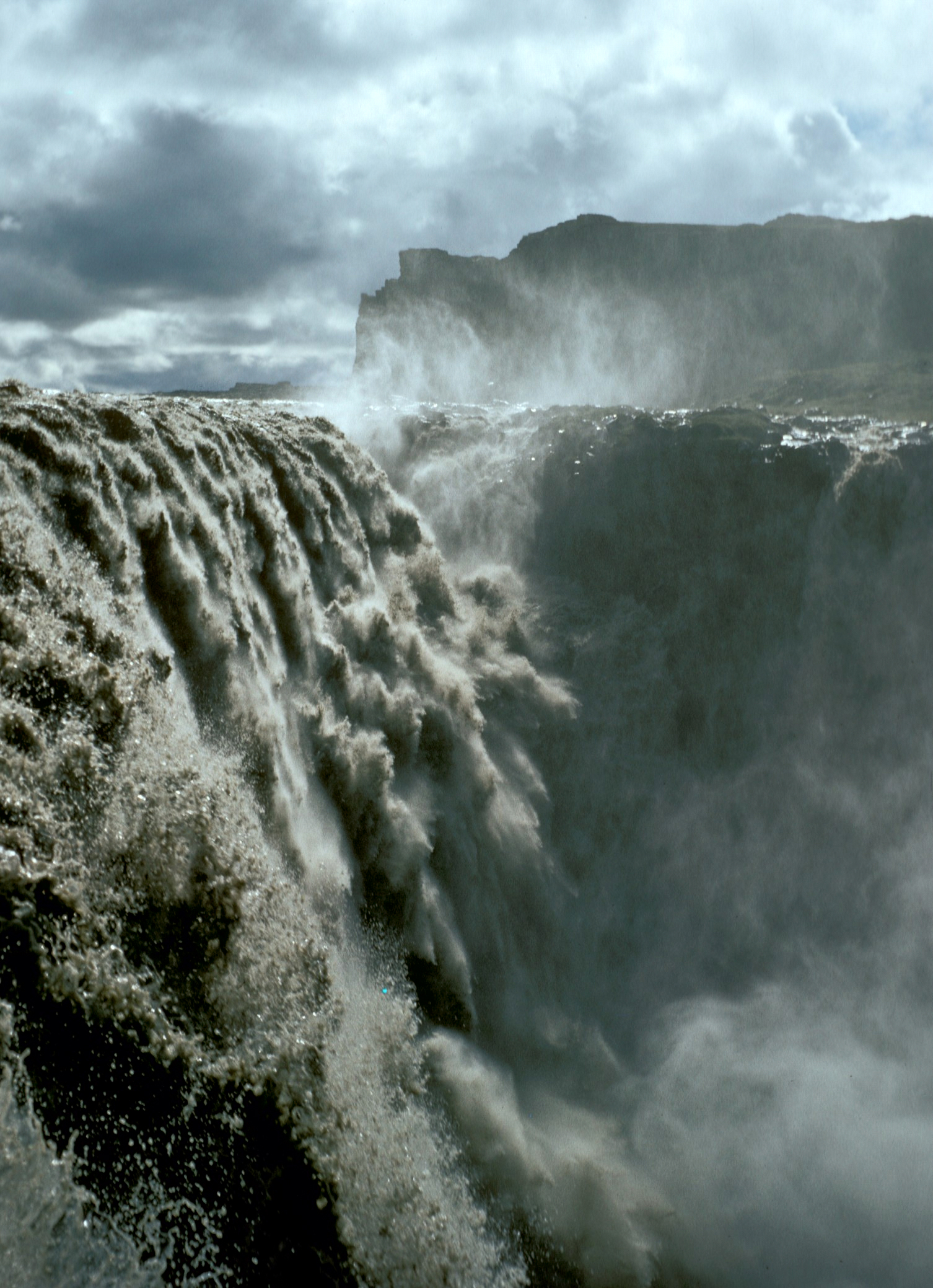
The Dettifoss in Iceland on 31 July 1972

Waterfalls are an important factor in determining the distribution of lotic organisms such as fish and aquatic invertebrates, as they may restrict dispersal along streams. The presence or absence of certain species can have cascading ecological effects, and thus cause differences in trophic regimes above and below waterfalls. Certain aquatic plants and insects also specialize in the environment of the waterfall itself. A 2012 study of the Agbokim Waterfalls, has suggested that they hold biodiversity to a much higher extent than previously thought.

Waterfalls also affect terrestrial species. They create a small microclimate in their immediate vicinity characterized by cooler temperatures and higher humidity than the surrounding region, which may support diverse communities of mosses and liverworts. Species of these plants may have disjunct populations at waterfall zones far from their core range.

Waterfalls provide nesting cover for several species of bird, such as the black swift and white-throated dipper. These species preferentially nest in the space behind the falling water, which is thought to be a strategy to avoid predation.

== Types ==
Type	Image	Notes
Ledge waterfall		Water descends vertically over a vertical cliff, maintaining partial contact with the bedrock. May be several types: Block/Sheet: Water descends from a relatively wide stream or river.; Classical: Fall height is nearly equal to stream width, forming a square shape.; Curtain: Fall height is greater than the width of the falling water stream.
Plunge		Fast-moving water falls vertically, completely losing contact with the bedrock surface.
Punchbowl		Water is constricted as it falls and then spreads into a wider pool.
Horsetail		Falling water mostly maintains contact with bedrock. Several types: Chute: A large quantity of water forced through a narrow, vertical passage.; Fan: Water spreads horizontally as it falls while remaining in contact with bedrock.
Cascade		Water descends a series of rock steps.
Tiered/Multi-step/Staircase		A series of waterfalls one after another of roughly the same size each with its own sunken plunge pool.
Cataract		A large, powerful waterfall.
Segmented		Distinct flows of water form as it descends.
Moulin		A waterfall in a glacier.

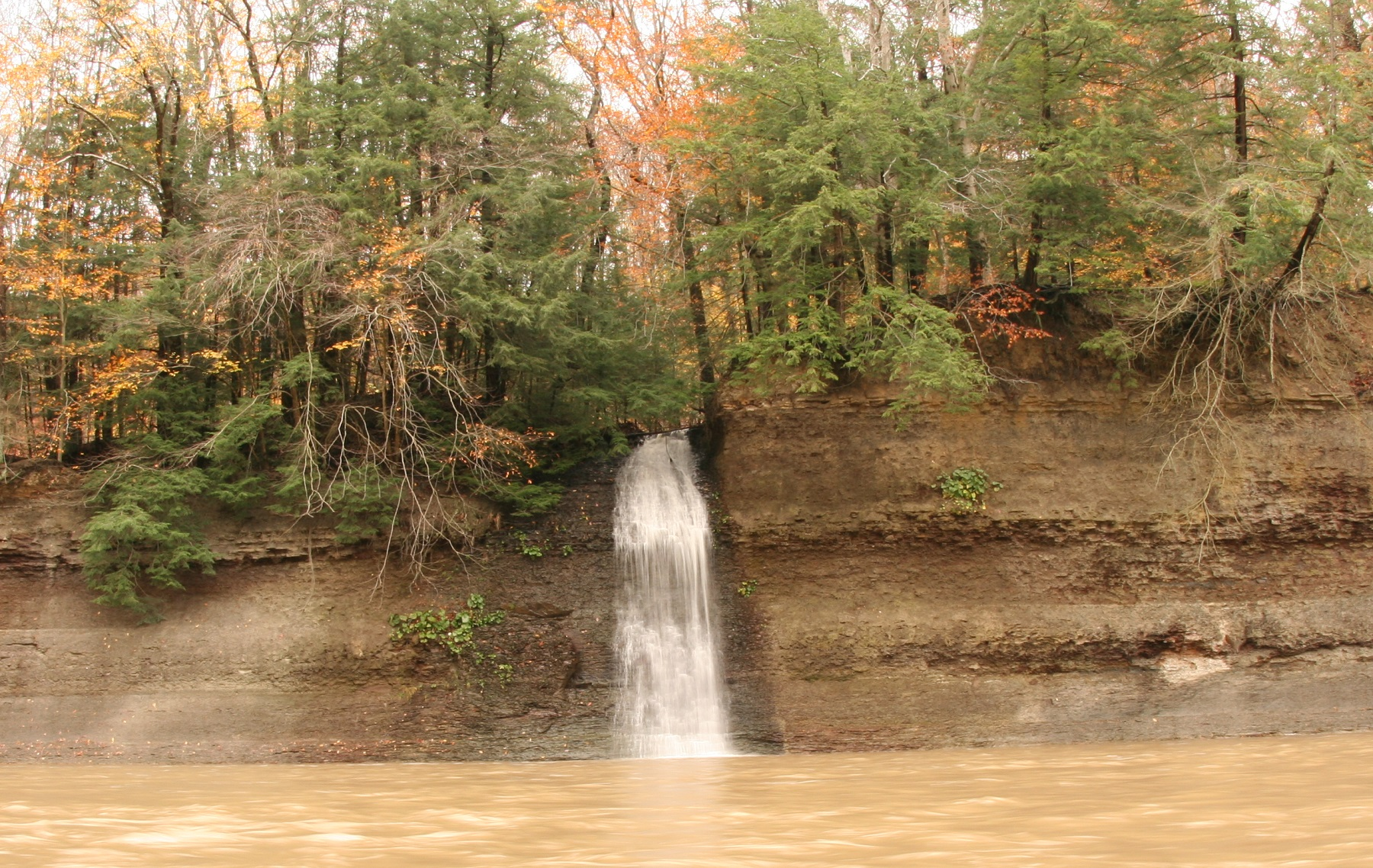
An example of an ephemeral waterfall. This one, when flowing, feeds into the Chagrin River.

Some waterfalls are also distinct in that they do not flow continuously. Ephemeral waterfalls only flow after a rain or a significant snowmelt.

Waterfalls can also be found underground.

Waterfalls may also be found under the ocean, where cold, denser water overflows a cataract and sinks below the adjacent warmer water. Beneath the Denmark Strait, an underwater fall flows from a point 2000 feet beneath the strait's surface to the ocean floor about 11,500 feet deep.

== Humans and waterfalls ==
=== Research ===
The geographer Andrew Goudie wrote in 2020 that waterfalls have received "surprisingly limited research." Alexander von Humboldt wrote about them in the 1820s. There is no name for the specific field of researching waterfalls, and in the published literature been described as "scattered", though it is popular to describe studying waterfalls as "waterfallology". An early paper written on waterfalls was published in 1884 by William Morris Davis, a geologist known as the "father of American geography". In the 1930s Edward Rashleigh published a pioneering work on waterfalls. In 1942 Oscar von Engeln wrote of the lack of research on waterfalls:

Waterfall sites more than any other geomorphic feature attract and hold the interest of the general public. Because they have such a popular approval waterfalls are not given serious attention by some students of systematic geomorphology. This attitude is not to be commended. Waterfalls are significant items for geomorphic investigation.

As late as 1985 a scholar felt that "waterfalls remain a very much neglected aspect of river studies". Studies of waterfalls increased dramatically in the second half of the 20th century. Numerous waterfall guidebooks exist, and the World Waterfall Database is a website cataloging thousands of waterfalls.

=== Exploration and naming ===
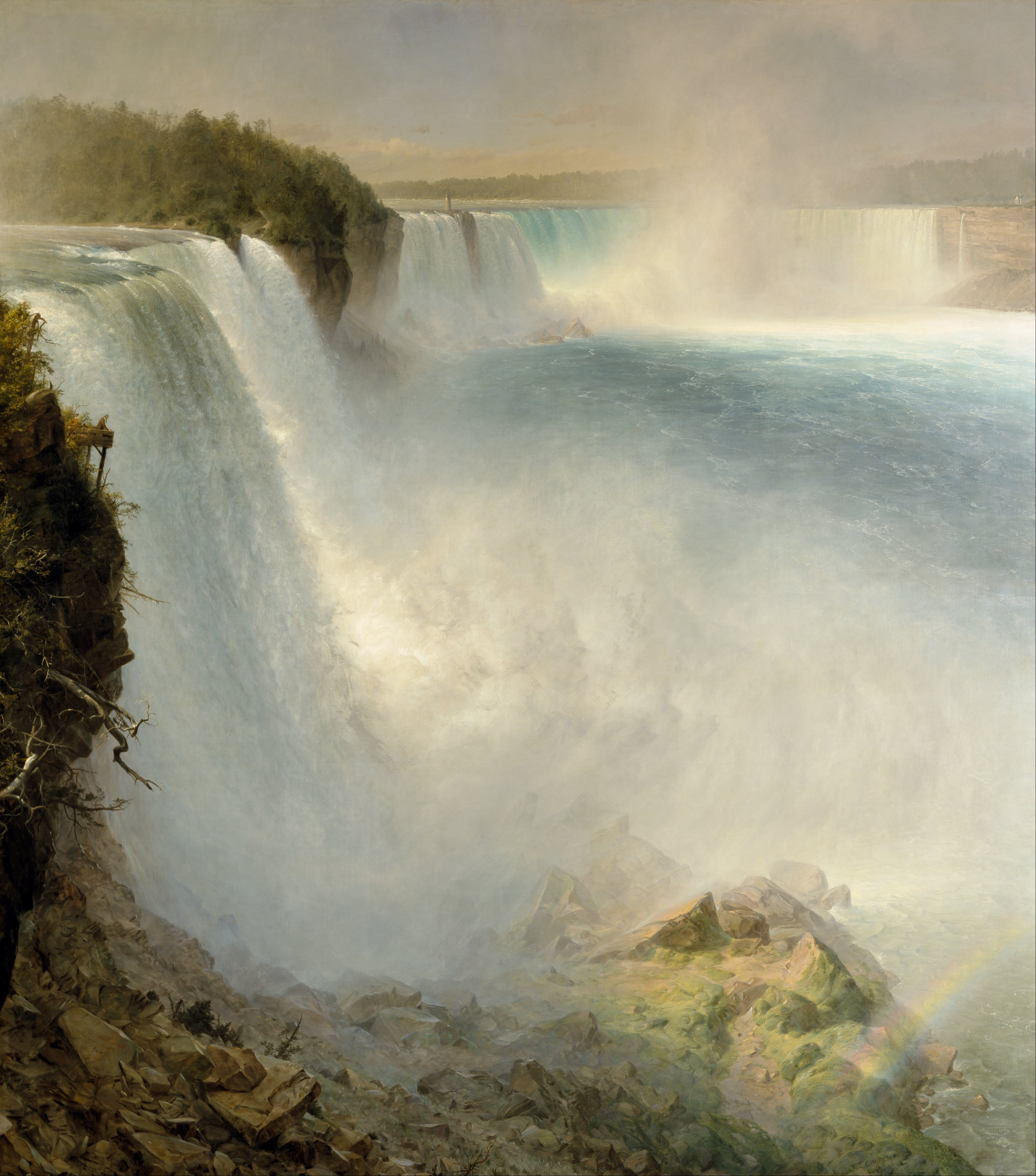
Niagara Falls, from the American Side (Frederic Edwin Church, 1867)

Many explorers have visited waterfalls. European explorers recorded waterfalls they came across. In 1493, Christopher Columbus noted Carbet Falls in Guadeloupe, which was likely the first waterfall Europeans recorded seeing in the Americas. In the late 1600s, Louis Hennepin visited North America, providing early descriptions of Niagara Falls and the Saint Anthony Falls. The geographer Brian J. Hudson argues that it was uncommon to specifically name waterfalls until the 1700s. The trend of Europeans specifically naming falls was in tandem with increased scientific focus on nature, the rise of Romanticism, and increased importance of hydropower with the Industrial Revolution. European explorers often preferred to give waterfalls names in their own language; for instance, David Livingstone named Victoria Falls after Queen Victoria, though it was known by local peoples as Mosi-oa-Tunya. Many waterfalls have descriptive names which can come from the river they are on, places they are near, their features, or events that happened near them.

Some countries that were colonized by European nations have taken steps to return names to waterfalls previously renamed by European explorers. Exploration of waterfalls continues; the Gocta Cataracts were first announced to the world in 2006.

Waterfalls can pose major barriers to travel. Canals are sometimes built as a method to go around them, other times things must be physically carried around or a railway built.

=== Development and tourism ===
Waterfalls are often visited by people simply to see them. Hudson theorizes that they make good tourism sites because they are generally considered beautiful and are relatively uncommon. Activities at waterfalls can include bathing, swimming, photography, rafting, canyoning, abseiling, rock climbing, and ice climbing. Waterfalls can also be sites for generating hydroelectric power and can hold good fishing opportunities. Wealthy people were known to visit areas with features such as waterfalls at least as early as in Ancient Rome and China. However, many waterfalls were essentially inaccessible due to the treacherous terrain surrounding them until improvements began to be made such as paths to the falls, becoming common across the United Kingdom and America in the 1800s and continuing through the 1900s and into the 21st century. Remote waterfalls are now often visited by air travel.

Human development has also threatened many waterfalls. For instance, the Guaíra Falls, once one of the most powerful waterfalls in the world, were submerged in 1982 by a human-made dam, as were the Ripon Falls in 1952. Conversely, other waterfalls have seen significantly lower water levels as a result of diversion for hydroelectricity, such as the Tyssestrengene in Norway. Development of the areas around falls as tourist attractions has also destroyed the natural scene around many of them.

Waterfalls are included on thirty-eight World Heritage Sites and many others are protected by governments.

=== In culture ===
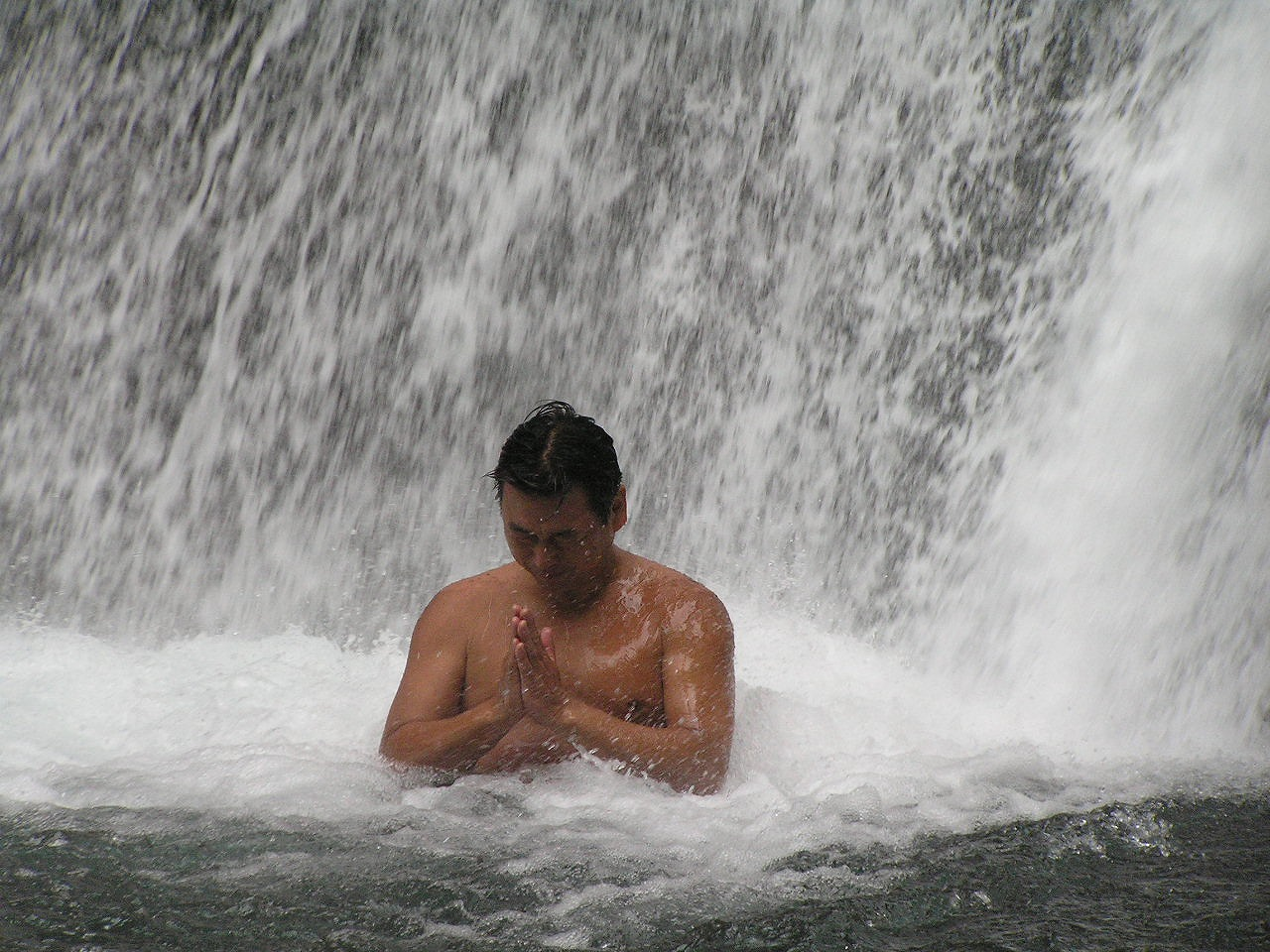
A man practicing sādhanā in Japan

Waterfalls play a role in many cultures, as religious sites and subjects of art and music.

Many artists have painted waterfalls and they are referenced in many songs, such as those of the Kaluli people in Papua New Guinea. Michael Harner titled his study of the Jivaroan peoples of Ecuador The Jivaro: People of the Sacred Waterfalls. Artists such as those of the Hudson River School and J. M. W. Turner and John Sell Cotman painted particularly notable pictures of waterfalls in the 19th century.

One of the versions of the Shinto purification ceremony of misogi involves standing underneath a waterfall in ritual clothing. In Japan the Nachi Falls are a site of pilgrimage, as are falls near Tirupati, India, and the Saut-d'Eau, Haiti. The Otavalos use Piguchi waterfall as part of the Churru ritual which serves as a coming of age ceremony. Many waterfalls in Africa were places of worship for the native peoples and got their names from gods in the local religion.

In Chinese tradition, the waterfall represents the season of autumn, yin, and the Chinese dragon's power over water that comes from the former two.

== List ==
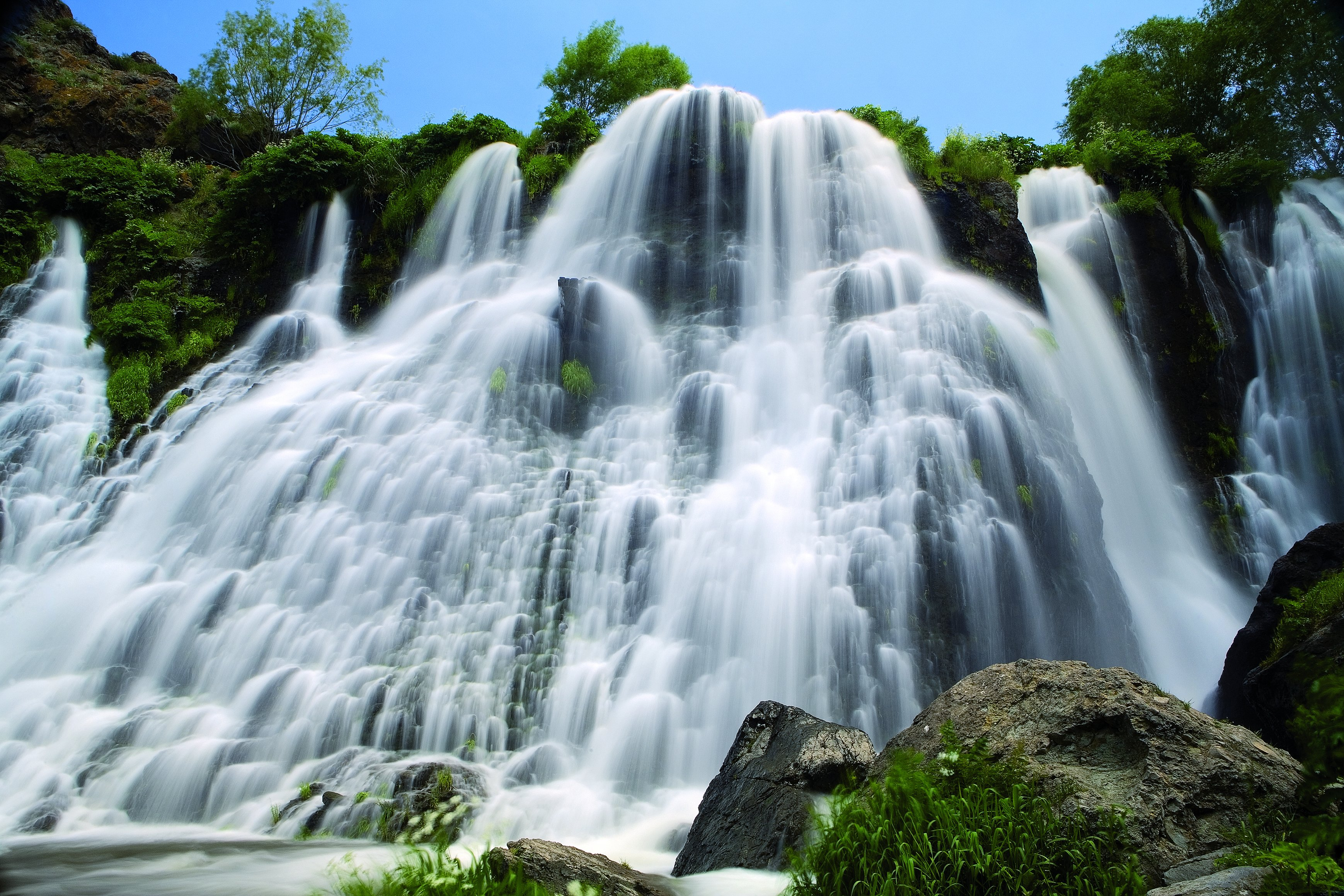
Shaki Waterfall in Armenia

There are thousands of waterfalls in the world, though no exact number has been calculated. The World Waterfall Database lists 7,827 as of 2013, but this is likely incomplete; as noted by Hudson, over 90% of their listings are in North America. Many guidebooks to local waterfalls have been published. There is also no agreement how to measure the height of a waterfall, or even what constitutes one. Angel Falls in Venezuela is the tallest waterfall in the world, the Khone Phapheng Falls in Laos are the widest, and the Inga Falls on the Congo River are the biggest by flow rate, while the Dry Falls in Washington are the largest confirmed waterfalls ever. The highest known subterranean waterfall is in Vrtoglavica Cave in Slovenia. The Denmark Strait cataract is an undersea overflow which could be considered a "waterfall" under a very broad usage of that term; if so included, it is the largest known waterfall.

Artificial waterfalls are water features or fountains that imitate a natural waterfall. The Cascata delle Marmore is the tallest artificially built waterfall at 541 feet (165 m).

== See also ==
- Reverse waterfall
- Subterranean waterfall

== Bibliography ==
- Goudie, Andrew S. (31 March 2020). "Waterfalls: Forms, Distribution, Processes and Rates of Recession". Quaestiones Geographicae. 39 (1): 59–77. Bibcode:2020QGeo...39a..59G. doi:10.2478/quageo-2020-0005.
- Hudson, Brian J. (2013b). "Waterfalls, science and aesthetics" (PDF). Journal of Cultural Geography. 30 (3): 356–379. doi:10.1080/08873631.2013.828482.
