= Mineral Springs Waterfall =

- Mineral Springs Waterfall in fall of 2007.
- Location: Ransom County, North Dakota
- Coordinates: 46.50330°N 97.90113°W
- Elevation: 1,140 feet (350 m)
- Total height: 8 feet (2.4 m)
- Number of drops: 1

Mineral Springs Waterfall is a very small natural waterfall located in the Sheyenne River State Forest in Ransom County, North Dakota, United States. It is the only registered and publicly-accessible natural waterfall in the state, known for its short drop and remote location. The waterfall is fed by an underground spring that flows into the Sheyenne River and then descends approximately 8 feet (2.4 m), which can reach up to 15 feet (4.6 m) depending on water and ground conditions. Though Mill Pond Falls is frequently listed as the "smallest natural waterfall in the United States" at 16 feet (4.9 m), Mineral Springs Waterfall is a foot shorter at its maximum height.

== Location and features ==
The waterfall is situated about one mile southeast of Fort Ransom, North Dakota, along Valley Road, and approximately 10 miles west of Lisbon. The hike to the falls follows the blue-blazed Mineral Springs Trail, which has been part of the North Country National Scenic Trail since 1984. The trailhead for the intermediate-difficulty hike the waterfall is located on is accessible via 122nd Street from State Highway 27. A moderate hiking pace would result in reaching the waterfall location between two and three hours.

In 1975, the North Dakota Forest Service acquired the land the waterfall is located on. The waterfall is located at GPS coordinates 46.50330, -97.90113; the trailhead at 46.50275,-97.87819. The Scenic Trail was expanded two miles in 2006 to create a path leading to the rare waterfall. The waterfall is a ledge waterfall, generated from a spring-fed tributary and generally flows throughout the year, although freezing conditions may occur in winter. Backcountry primitive camping is allowed on the trail adjacent to the waterfall site.

== Recognition and notability ==
The trailhead sign at the beginning of Mineral Springs Trail, outlining the distance to and information about Mineral Springs Waterfall.

Mineral Springs Waterfall is the only waterfall in North Dakota according to the USGS and the World Waterfall Database. Some North Dakota residents have claimed that there are other waterfalls in North Dakota, but on private land, which would not qualify for registration. It is often described as a "hidden gem" of North Dakota, located in a town of only 91 residents, and is a popular destination for hikers and nature enthusiasts. It is mentioned in local hiking guides, including North Dakota's Best Hiking Trails by Scott Kudelka, and promoted by the North Dakota Forest Service and the Sheyenne River Valley national scenic byway. It was listed by CNN as one of the "Seven Wonders of Ransom County".

While North Dakota is not typically known for waterfalls, Mineral Springs Waterfall holds unique status as the state's only natural registered waterfall, contributing to its popularity among "waterfall chasers" seeking to explore all 50 U.S. states. Due to its rarity in the state and remote location, some commentators dub it as "North Dakota's fountain of youth" and opine that it may carry healing properties. Because of this novelty, the waterfall holds the record for the shortest, tallest, and only waterfall in North Dakota (and by default, the Most Gorgeous Waterfall in North Dakota according to Reader's Digest), but remains most notable for being a registered waterfall with very small width and drop height. It is unofficially the shortest registered waterfall in the United States based on state waterfall tracking information from the USGS.
