= Bears in Anchorage =

Grizzly bears and black bears

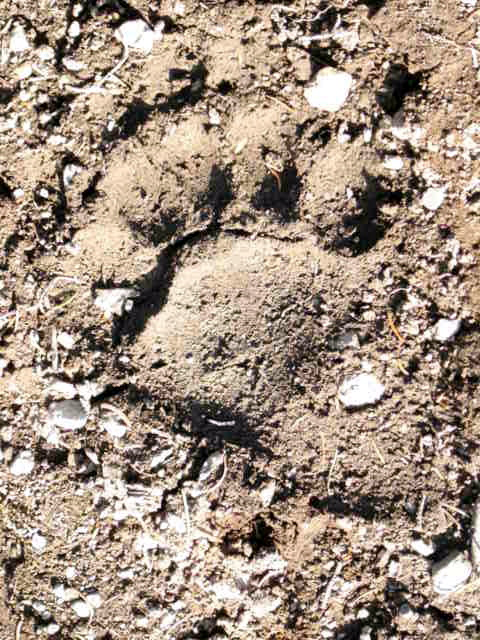
Bear print in the driveway of a home in Anchorage, Alaska

There are many grizzly bears and black bears in Anchorage, Alaska.

== Bear population ==
There are between 200 and 300 black bears living in the city, according to a rough estimate given by state of Alaska wildlife biologist Rick Sinnott. DNA studies based on collected hair samples have shown that the city is also home to at least 36 grizzly bears. (That figure, however, is likely an underestimate: hair was collected from only seven of eleven grizzly bears that had been radio-collared in a separate study.) Anecdotal accounts suggest that bear sightings are increasing in frequency, but biologists are skeptical that this increase in observations is indicative of a population increase.

Spawning salmon in Campbell Creek attract many bears to the city from the Chugach Mountains.

== Human–bear encounters and management issues ==
Though bear populations may not be increasing, human–bear encounters are on the rise. As Anchorage's population has increased and urbanization has removed forest, bears have become easier to spot.

In the late 1990s, Anchorage residents responding to a survey indicated that they wanted more animals, including bears, in the city. It is unclear whether attitudes have remained the same, with some people growing uncomfortable with increasing bear encounters.

Recent laws have made it illegal to put out garbage before the morning of trash day, and the Alaska Department of Fish and Game has lobbied the city to enforce the law by ticketing. The ADFG has also undertaken a bear education campaign, including sending employees door to door to discourage Anchorage residents from leaving food and garbage out.

In 1995, two runners were killed by a bear along McHugh Creek. Two maulings in July and August 2008 were the first such incidents recorded closer to the city center.

== See also ==
- John Pezzenti, wildlife photographer noted for his shots of bears in Alaska
