= Newington Junction =

Coordinates: 41.7144°N 72.7352°W

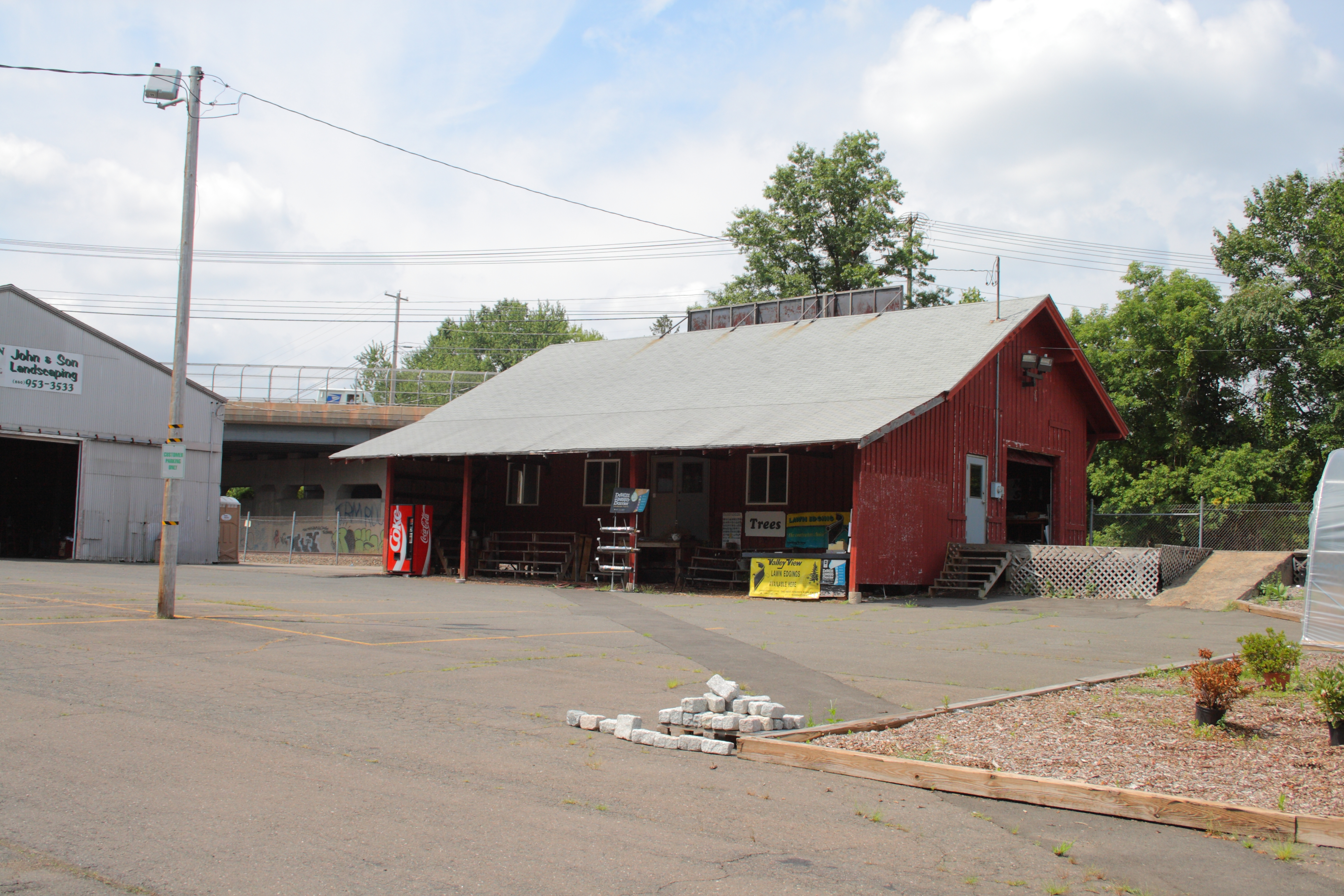
The site of the Newington Junction Railroad Depot where the rail line crosses Willard Avenue

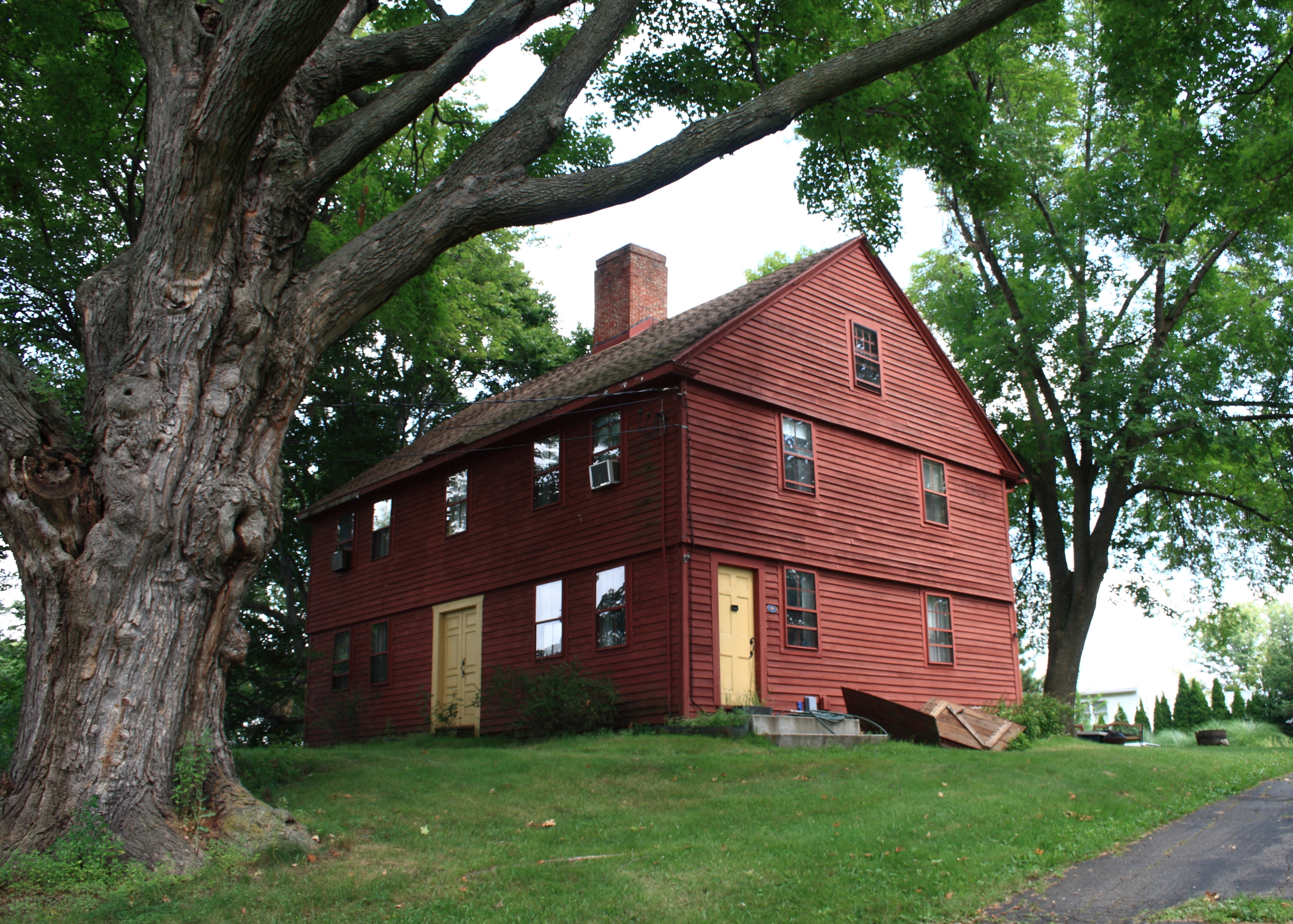
The Willard Homestead at 372 Willard Avenue in the Newington Junction area

Newington Junction is a section of the town of Newington, Connecticut, United States. It is centered at the intersection of Willard Avenue (Route 173) and West Hill Road in the northwestern part of the town, in the area generally just south of the Hartford city line. The name of the area refers to the railroad junction where the railroad line from New Haven meets with the railroad line from Bristol and Waterbury. The development of Newington Junction as a result of the railroad was instrumental in the separation of the town of Newington from its mother town of Wethersfield.

The area is also architecturally significant for the range of styles used in houses built during the period of significance of the area. The neighborhood contains houses with architectural styles from the late 18th century to the early 20th century. For reasons of both historical and architectural significance, a significant portion of the neighborhood has been listed on the National Register of Historic Places as historic districts. The architectural centerpiece of Newington Junction is the Willard Homestead and the Newington Junction Railroad Depot located in the center of the neighborhood. Both properties are separately listed on the National Register. Because the central area is now surrounded by incompatible modern structures, the architecturally significant areas of the neighborhood have been grouped into three clusters, each designated as a separate historic district, namely, Newington Junction South, North, and West Historic Districts.

== Historic districts ==
=== Newington Junction South Historic District ===
- Newington Junction South Historic District
- U.S. National Register of Historic Places
- U.S. Historic district
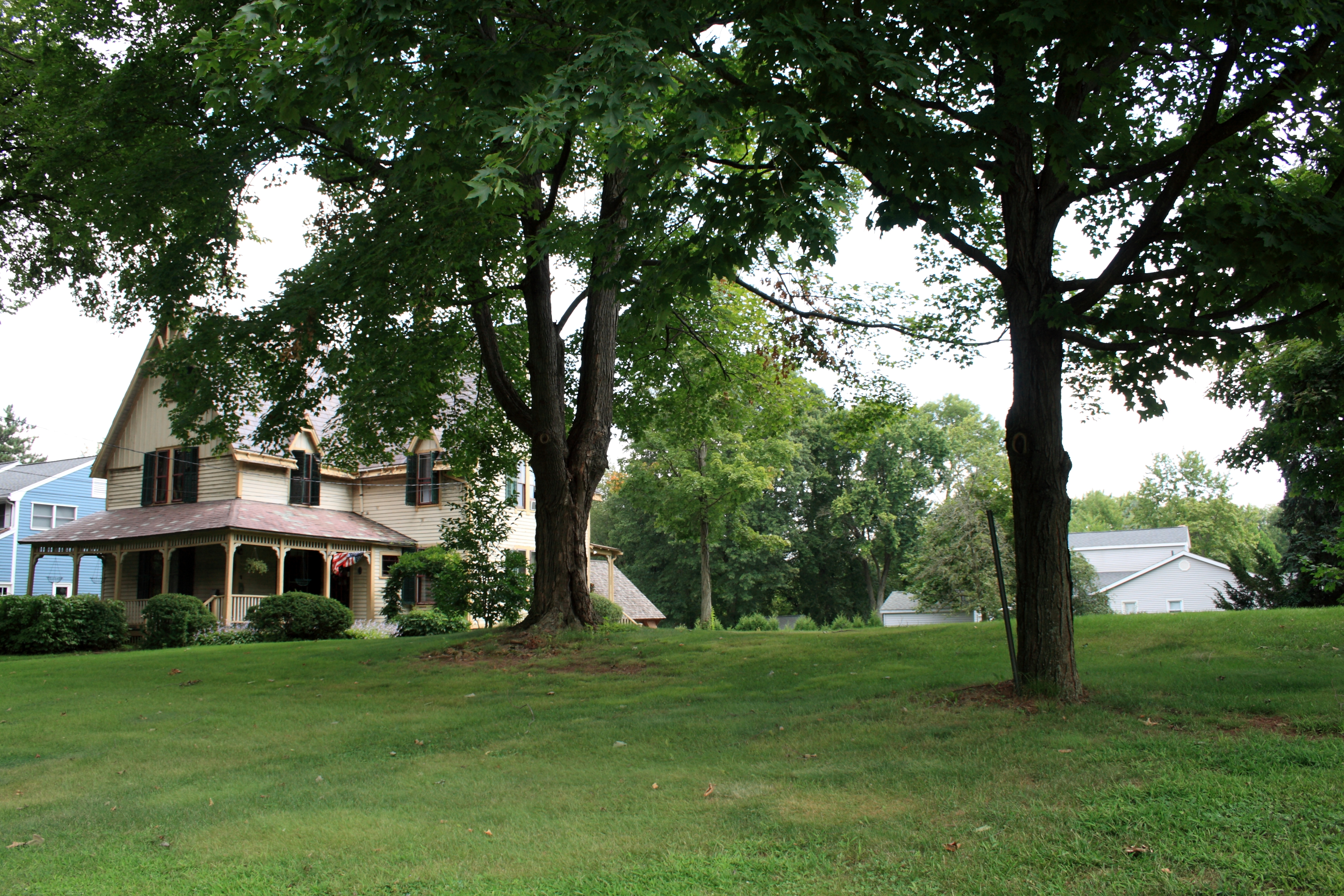
- Part of the Newington Junction South Historic District

- Location within Connecticut Location within the United States
- Location: 268-319 Willard Avenue, Newington, Connecticut
- Area: 10 acres (4.0 ha)
- Architectural style: Late Victorian, Colonial, Gothic Revival
- MPS: Newington Junction MRA
- NRHP reference No.: 86003462
- Added to NRHP: June 2, 1987

The South district is located along Willard Avenue, south of the intersection with West Hill Road (268-319 Willard Avenue). It consists of nine contributing and two non-contributing properties over an area of 10 acres (4.0 ha). The houses here include examples of Late Victorian, Colonial, Gothic Revival styles, showcasing architecture from the period 1800–1924.

=== Newington Junction North Historic District ===
- Newington Junction North Historic District
- U.S. National Register of Historic Places
- U.S. Historic district
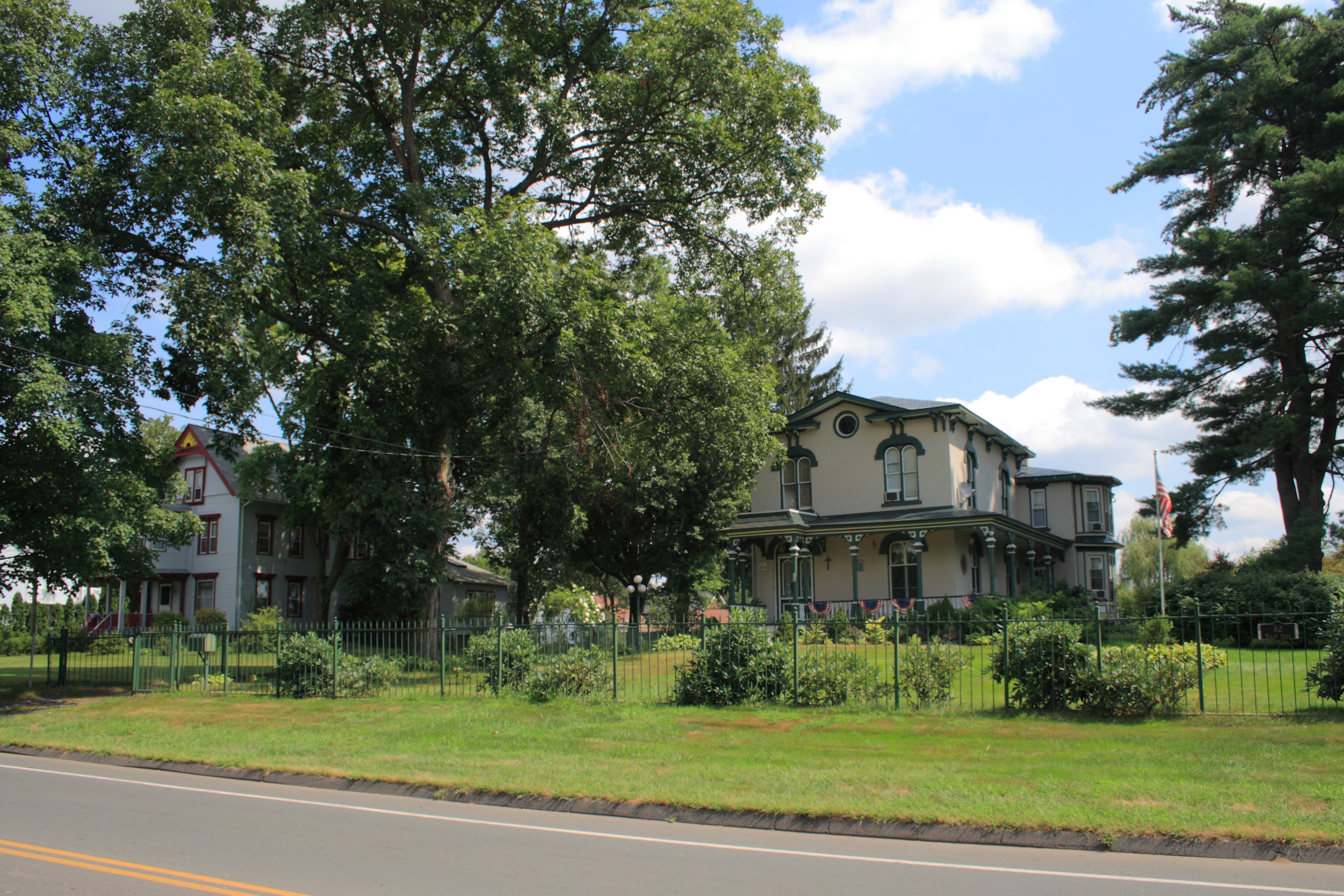
- Part of the Newington Junction North Historic District

- Location within Connecticut Location within the United States
- Location: 55--108 Willard Ave., Newington, Connecticut
- Area: 10 acres (4.0 ha)
- Architectural style: Colonial Revival, Late Victorian, Queen Anne
- MPS: Newington Junction MRA
- NRHP reference No.: 86003465
- Added to NRHP: June 2, 1987

The North district is located along Willard Avenue, north of the intersection with West Hill Road (55-108 Willard Avenue). It consists of 13 contributing and three non-contributing properties over an area of 10 acres (40,000 m^{2}). The houses here include examples of Colonial Revival, Late Victorian, and Queen Anne styles, showcasing architecture from the period 1850–1949.

=== Newington Junction West Historic District ===
- Newington Junction West Historic District
- U.S. National Register of Historic Places
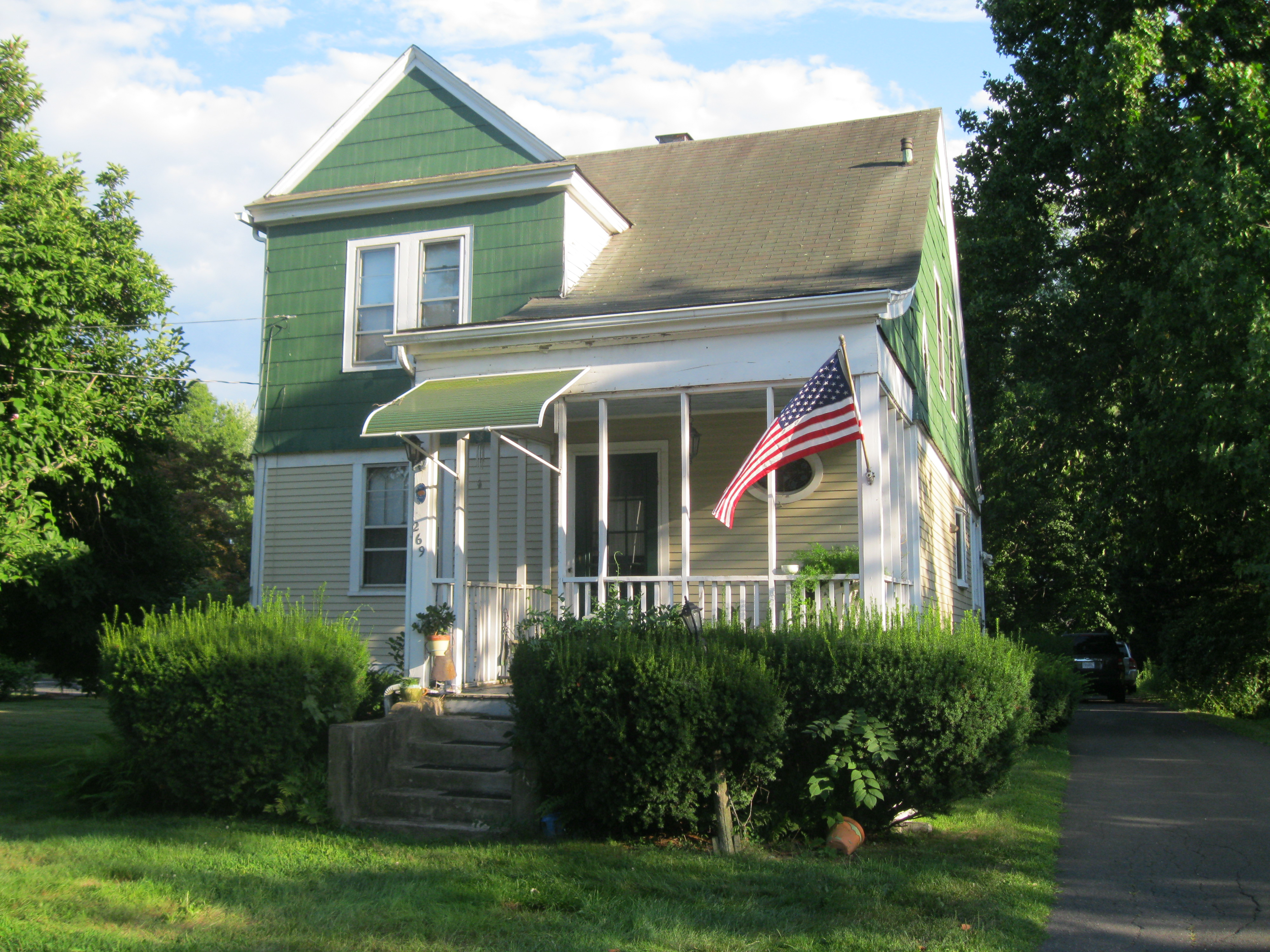
- 269 West Hill Road

- Location within Connecticut Location within the United States
- Location: 175 and 181--183 Willard Ave. and 269--303 W. Hill Rd., Newington, Connecticut
- Area: 8 acres (3.2 ha)
- Architectural style: Colonial Revival, Late Victorian, Colonial
- MPS: Newington Junction MRA
- NRHP reference No.: 86003464
- Added to NRHP: June 2, 1987

The West district is primarily located along West Hill Road (269-303 West Hill Road) but also includes two additional properties on Willard Avenue near the intersection of Willard Avenue and West Hill Road. The district consists of 13 contributing and three non-contributing properties over an area of 8 acres (32,000 m^{2}). The houses include examples of Colonial, Colonial Revival, and Late Victorian styles, showcasing architecture from the period 1650–1949.

== See also ==
- Newington Junction station
- National Register of Historic Places listings in Hartford County, Connecticut
