= Willard Homestead (Newington, Connecticut) =

Historic house in Connecticut, United States

- U.S. National Register of Historic Places
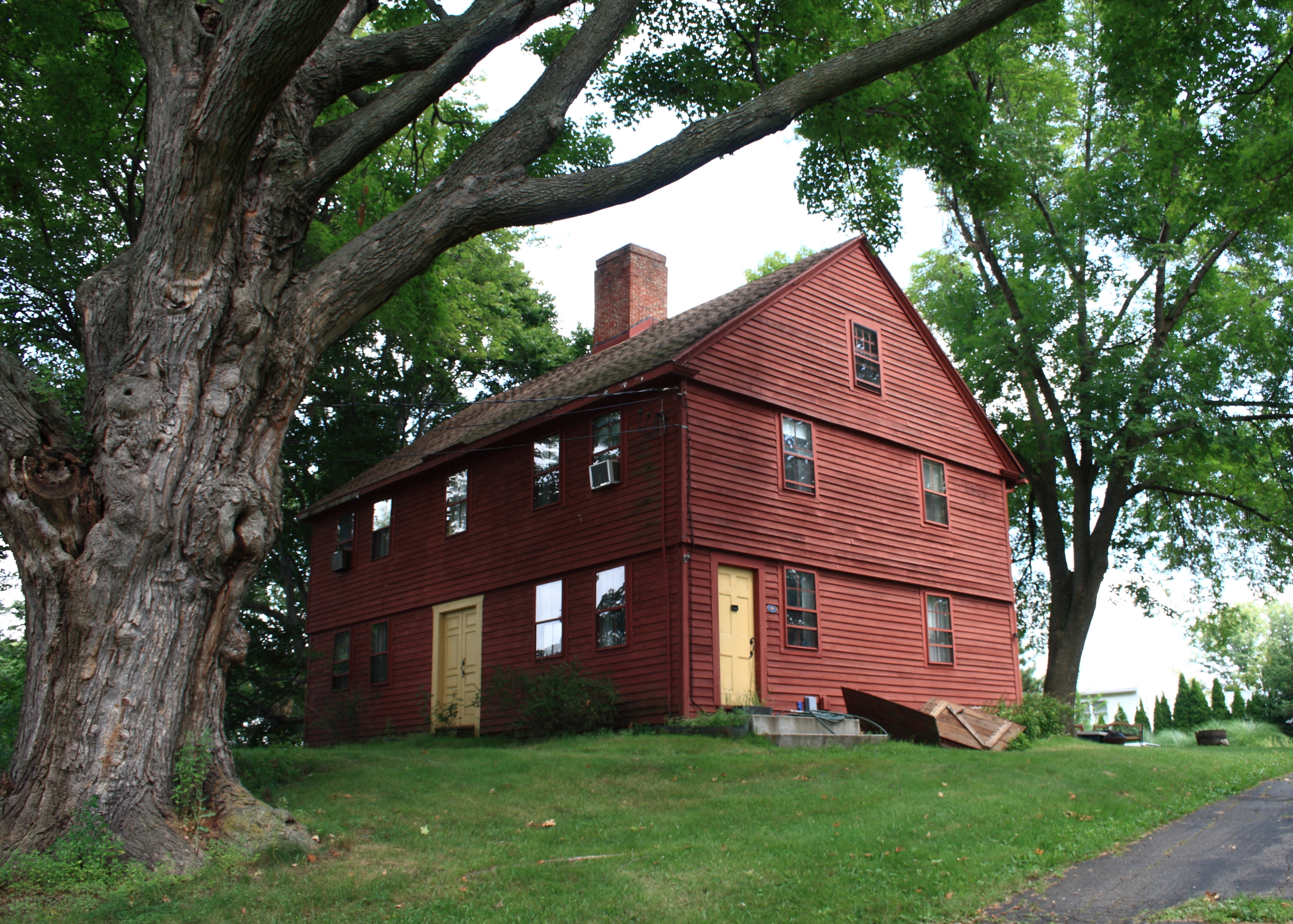

- Location within Connecticut Location within the United States
- Location: 372 Willard Avenue, Newington, Connecticut
- Coordinates: 41°42′30″N 72°44′10″W
- Area: 3 acres (1.2 ha)
- Built: c. 1730
- Architectural style: Colonial
- MPS: Newington Junction MRA
- NRHP reference No.: 86003461
- Added to NRHP: December 22, 1986

The Willard Homestead is a historic house at 372 Willard Avenue the Newington Junction area of the town of Newington, Connecticut. Construction of the house is estimated to have been in 1730, based on architectural evidence. In addition to being a well-preserved 18th-century house, it is locally significant for its association with the Willard family, who were early settlers of the Newington area. The house was listed on the National Register of Historic Places in 1986.

== Description and history ==
The Willard Homestead is located between Newington's town center and Newington Junction, on the east side of Willard Avenue. It is a 2 1/2-story wood-frame structure, five bays wide, with a large central chimney, clapboarded exterior, and a dry-laid brownstone foundation. A two-story ell extends to the rear of the house. The interior of the house retains a great many original features, including woodwork and plaster, and some of the original hardware. The interior follows a fairly typical central-chimney plan, with a narrow entry vestibule with winding staircase, chambers on either side, and the original kitchen at the rear, with small chambers in each of the rear corners.

The house was built about 1730, based on architectural analysis and deed research. The land on which it stands was granted to the Willard family in 1670, when the area was still part of Wethersfield. It remained in the Willard family until the mid-19th century. Josiah Willard, who was raised in this house, was Newington's first parish clerk, and is credited with naming the town. Both he and a later resident also served as local school teachers.

== See also ==
- National Register of Historic Places listings in Hartford County, Connecticut
