= Gen. Martin Kellogg House =

Historic house in Connecticut, United States

- U.S. National Register of Historic Places
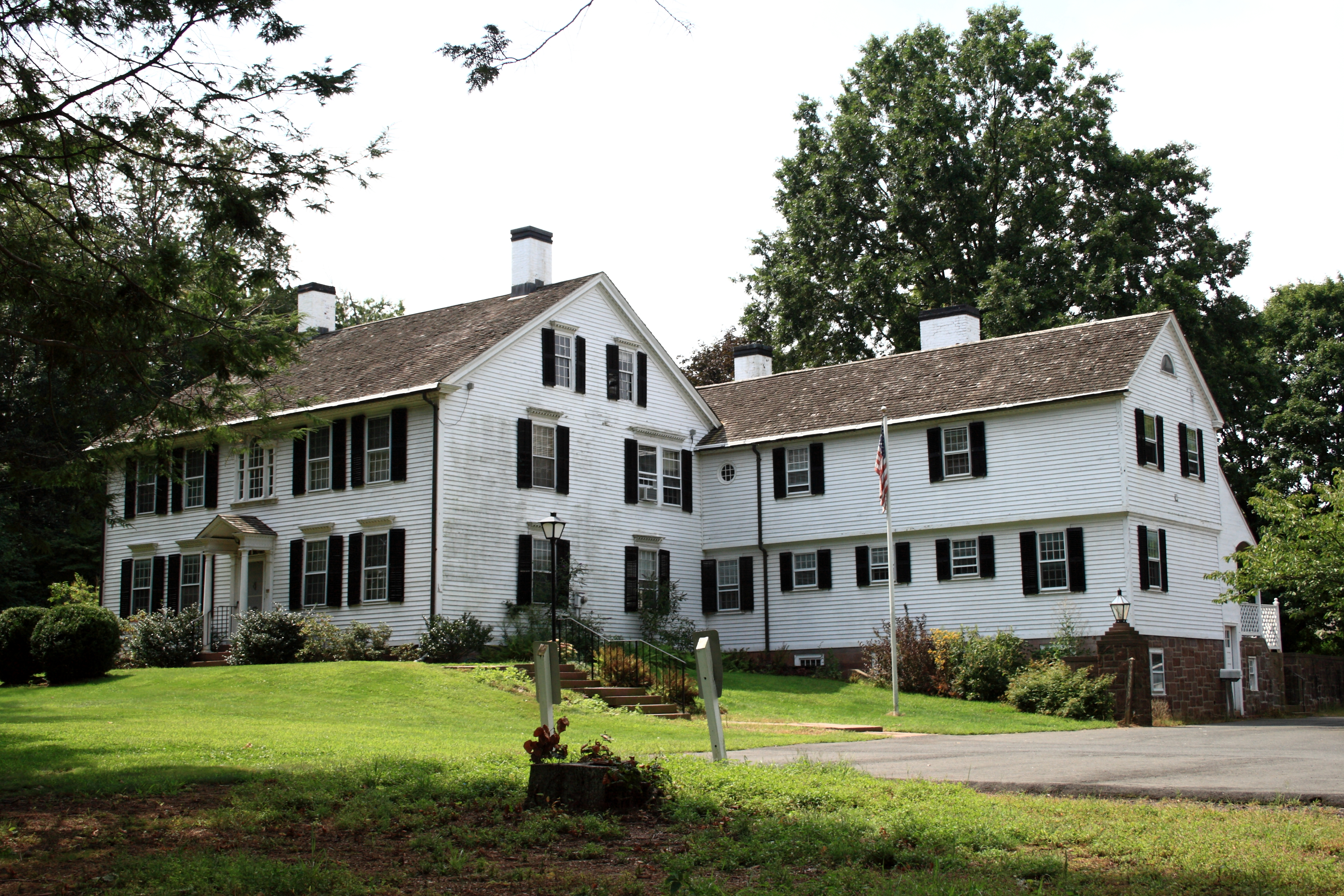
- Gen. Martin Kellogg House in 2009

- Location within Connecticut Location within the United States
- Location: 679 Willard Avenue, Newington, Connecticut
- Coordinates: 41°41′53″N 72°44′4″W
- Area: 5.7 acres (2.3 ha)
- Built: 1808
- Architectural style: Georgian, Federal
- NRHP reference No.: 87001770
- Added to NRHP: October 1, 1987

The Gen. Martin Kellogg House, now more commonly known as the Kellog-Eddy House, is a historic house museum at 679 Willard Avenue in Newington, Connecticut. Built about 1808, it is a well-preserved example of Federal period residential architecture, and it was home to two of Newington's leading citizens. The house was listed on the National Register of Historic Places on October 1, 1987.

== Description and history ==
The Kellogg-Eddy House stands west of Newington center, on the west side of Willard Avenue (Connecticut Route 173), north of its junction with Cedar Street. It is a 2 1/2-story wood-frame structure, five bays wide, with a center entrance and two interior chimneys. Its front entry has a fanlight above and is sheltered by an original portico supported by turned columns. There are two two-story wings extending to the side and rear, which were added in 1927–28.

The main house was built c. 1808 by William Kellogg, the fourth of that name, who was a leading citizen of Newington, for his son Martin. Primarily a farmer, he received his military title for service in the state militia. Kellogg was instrumental in establishing a local academy for higher education in 1829. The house and farm were purchased in 1913 by Elford Welles Eddy, who was a distant cousin to the Kelloggs. Eddy kept a dairy herd on the farm, and served on the local library and water district boards. He also served one term in the state legislature. The town acquired the house from his widow in 1975. It is now operated by the local historical society and operated as a museum.

== See also ==
- National Register of Historic Places listings in Hartford County, Connecticut
