= Newington High School =

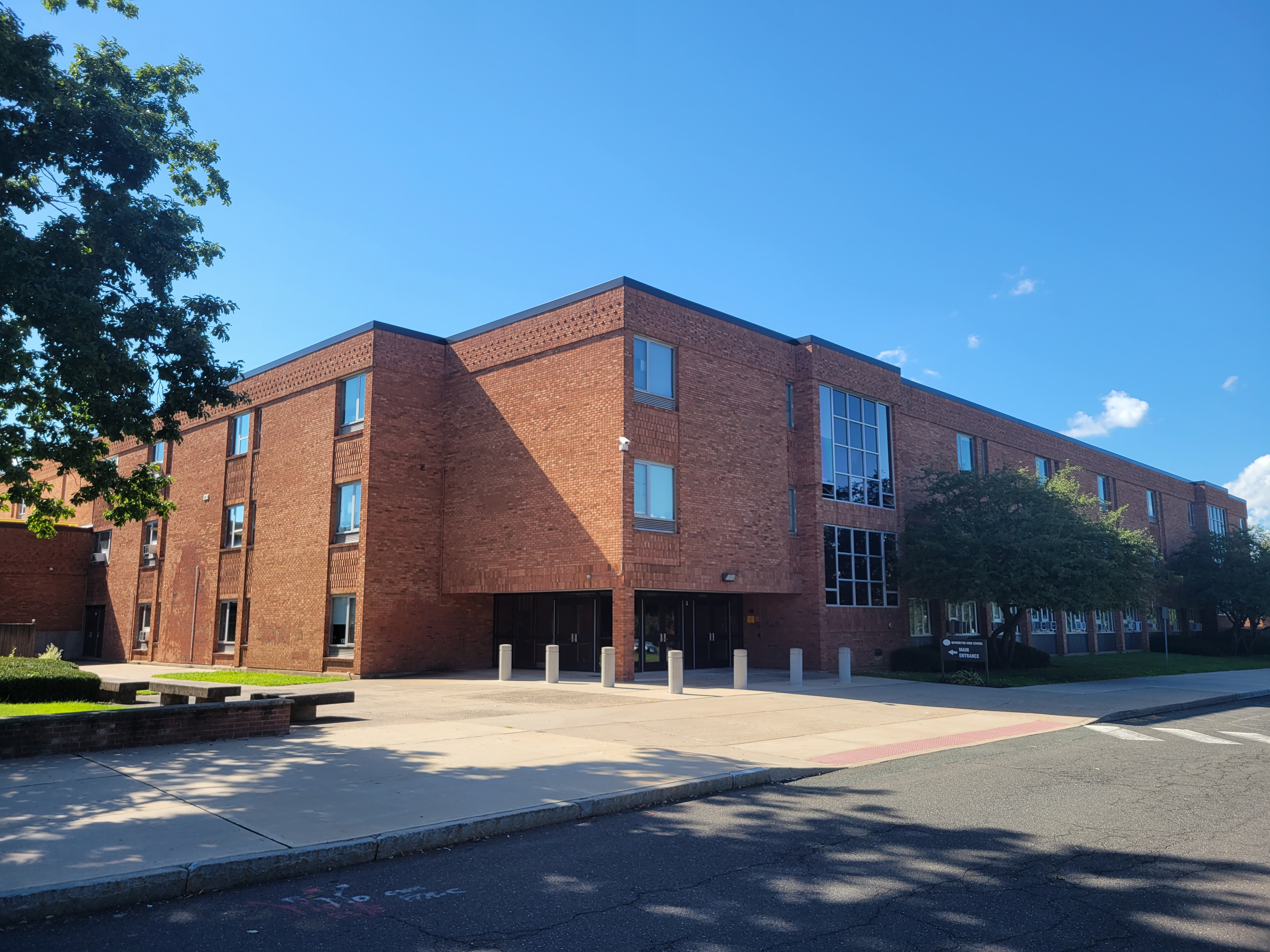
- Newington High School

Location
- 605 Willard Avenue; Newington, Connecticut 06111; United States
- Coordinates: 41°42′03″N 72°44′08″W

Information
- Type: Public
- Established: 1951 (75 years ago)
- School district: Newington Public Schools
- CEEB code: 070525
- NCES School ID: 090288000610
- Principal: Terra A. Tigno
- Teaching staff: 91.20 (on FTE basis)
- Grades: 9 to 12
- Enrollment: 1,284 (2023-2024)
- Student to teacher ratio: 14.08
- Colors: Blue and gold
- Athletics conference: Central Connecticut Conference
- Mascot: Nor'Easters
- Nickname: Newington Nor’Easters
- Website: hs.npsct.org

Newington High School is a public high school located in Newington, Connecticut, on Route 173/Willard Avenue. Its address is 605 Willard Avenue. All students in the town of Newington seeking a public high school education attend Newington High School.

== Athletics ==
=== CIAC State Championships ===
Team	Year
Boys' Volleyball (6x)	2012, 2014, 2015, 2017, 2018, 2019
Golf (6x)	1938, 1939, 1940, 1941, 1967, 1982
Ice Hockey (3x)	2012, 2013, 2022
Football (2x)	1979, 1980
Baseball (1x)	2011
Boys' Soccer (1x)	1950

== Notable alumni ==
- Bill Rodgers (Class of 1966) - U.S. Olympian and 4-Time Boston Marathon and 4-Time New York City Marathon champion.
- Karl Swanke (Class of 1976) - former NFL football player for the Green Bay Packers.
