= Newington, Connecticut =

- Town
- Town of Newington
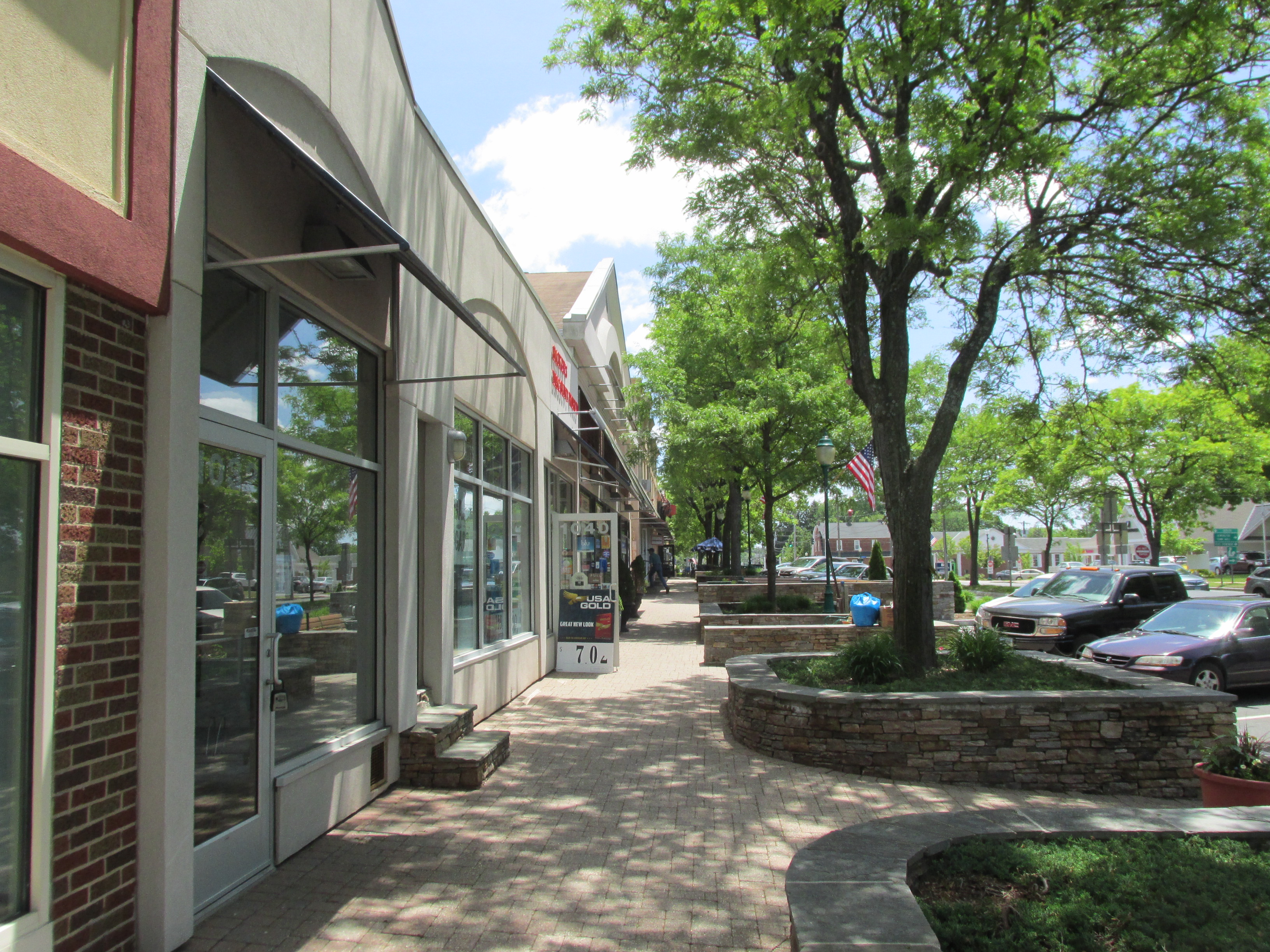
- Main Street

- Seal

- Coordinates: 41°41′14″N 72°43′48″W
- Country: United States
- U.S. state: Connecticut
- County: Hartford
- Region: Capitol Region
- Incorporated: 1871

Government
  - Type: Council-manager
  - Mayor: Jon Trister (D)
  - Town Council: List of Town Councilors: Kathy Gonzalez (D); Gail Budrejko (R); Matthew Plourd (D); A.J. Tiniakos (D); Tim Manke (R); David Nagel (R); Mitch Page (D); Kim Radda (D)

Area
  - Total: 13.1 sq mi (34.0 km^{2})
  - Land: 13.1 sq mi (34.0 km^{2})
  - Water: 0 sq mi (0.0 km^{2})
- Elevation: 85 ft (26 m)

Population (2020)
  - Total: 30,536
  - Density: 2,326/sq mi (898.1/km^{2})
- Time zone: UTC-5 (Eastern)
  - Summer (DST): UTC-4 (Eastern)
- ZIP Code: 06111
- Area codes: 860/959
- FIPS code: 09-52140
- GNIS feature ID: 0213472
- Website: www.newingtonct.gov

Newington is a town in Hartford County, Connecticut, United States. The town is part of the Capitol Planning Region. Located 8 miles (13 km) south of downtown Hartford, Newington is an older, mainly residential suburb located in Greater Hartford. As of 2023, the population is 30,527. The Connecticut Department of Transportation has its headquarters in Newington.

Newington is home to Mill Pond Falls, near the center of town. It is celebrated each fall during the Waterfall Festival.

The American Radio Relay League is headquartered in Newington, with a call sign of W1AW.

== History ==
Newington has a history of nearly 375 years. While not established officially as a separate town until 1871, settlers from nearby Wethersfield took up residence on the western frontier of their riverside town in 1636. "West Society," as some called it, was an area rich in timber that was used for pipe staves, barrel-sized containers used for colonial trade. Grand pastures also made the land ideal for herding and grazing cattle. Its inhabitants received land grants from Wethersfield leaders. Known as "West Farms," the area west of the central portion of Wethersfield became settled by those who were almost exclusively the descendants of the earliest Wethersfield settlers. In 1721, the "western" farmers requested that the General Assembly of the Connecticut Colony give their land the name "Newington" to denote "the new town in the meadow." The Assembly granted the request, even though it took another 150 years before Newington officially became an incorporated town. The town's name predates its official existence.

Newington's motto inscribed on its town seal is "growth and progress," which it began putting into effect at the end of the eighteenth century. In 1798, the precursor to the Berlin Turnpike was authorized and it changed the complexion of the land by dividing the vast farmlands from the commercial center. Originally called the Hartford and New Haven Turnpike, the route attracted a number of businesses from north to south between Hartford and New Haven.

The town came into its own at the start of the nineteenth century. Its location in the center of Connecticut attracted an increasing number of residents and commercial enterprises. Veteran of the War of 1812 Levi Lusk established one of the first businesses on the Turnpike, a tavern that stood as a precursor to the many motels, bars, stores, and restaurants that would come later. Railroads passed through Newington as early as the 1830s, which accelerated residential and commercial expansion. More homes were built and businesses established as the nineteenth century unfolded.

Newington grew in population and area by the second half of the nineteenth century. Wethersfield had done likewise, and two population centers were produced as a result. One centered on Wethersfield's inner village still closely tied to the Connecticut River; the other in Newington had developed its own identity distinct from its mother town.

An 1869 map of Newington shows that the town was divided into four districts—the North, the Middle, the South, and the South-east—that ran from east to west. From north to south, four main roads traversed the four districts starting from the West Hartford line extending all the way to the Berlin line to the south. Later the roads would be called the Berlin Turnpike, Main Street, Willard Avenue, and Church Street. The town extended four miles in a north–south direction and three miles in an east–west direction.

=== Incorporation and the Modern Era ===
In 1871, Newington had a population of 871 people with 132 dwellings, and roughly 130 farms, a substantial increase from the start of the nineteenth century. When Wethersfield town leaders refused to fund highway improvements for better access to the railroads, the town formally declared its independence on July 10.

Newington's incorporation coincided with the emergence of the modern era. John Fish's Store, in the center of town off Willard Street (later Willard Avenue), got the town's first telephone in 1883. The trolley began service in Newington in 1894 and connected Hartford and New Britain. The ride from Newington to the city took 20 minutes and cost five cents. Not only did residents marvel at the invention, but took note of its revolutionizing force; it was now possible to live in Newington and to work in surrounding cities. Farms still comprised the bulk of Newington land, but the road to the world of suburbia was being paved.

The trolley spurred more population growth. Newington had only 1,000 people living in it at the start of the twentieth century, but the number reached 4,000 by 1930. At first, Anglos moved to the town from Hartford and New Britain as foreign-born Poles, Italians, and Irish settled in those cities.

Automobiles, the most visible sign of technological progress, encouraged more immigration and did away with many farms. In the 1930s, Newington's political leaders facilitated this change by paving dirt roads, despite the Great Depression which ground much business activity to a halt. Cars as well as the bus system replaced the trolley service in 1937.

Modernization, to Newington, meant more than just trolleys, automobiles, and buses. Using government as an instrument of social improvement, in the spirit of the Progressives, reflected advancement in the early decades of the twentieth century. In 1898 Newington's Virginia Thrall Smith had appealed to the town's political leaders to build an asylum in Newington for the purpose of caring for neglected children. Overwhelmingly the town approved the request after Smith purchased land at the foot of Cedar Mountain in the town's eastern portion. Initially, it had been called the Home for Incurables, but in 1968 would be renamed The Newington Children's Hospital. Three other hospitals were built in town in the early twentieth century contemporaneous with the rise of Progressivism, including the 1911 establishment of Connecticut's first tuberculosis sanitarium on Cedar Mountain.

By the 1940s, Newington experienced the same level of expansion and population growth that other towns around the state had. The Hartford/New Haven Turnpike was renamed the Berlin Turnpike in 1942, and the road was widened from 18 feet (5.5 m) to 200 feet (61 m) the same year, a clear indication that this part of Newington had become vital to the town's commercial life. Mill Pond, in the western part of town, remained an attraction for residents; its 16-foot natural waterfall remains the smallest in the United States, and is depicted on the town seal. But the lifeblood of the community by mid century had shifted away from the area and toward the Turnpike, now known as "gasoline alley" because of the vast number of gas stations there.

Newington's population grew from 5,449 in 1940 to 9,110 in 1950. Along with North Haven, this increase constituted the fastest in the state. By the last decades of the twentieth century, the town's manufacturing base had begun to face dramatic challenges. Newington became the victim of the dwindling defense industry, while at the same time its own businesses such as the Torrington Company, a manufacturer of automobile parts, solvents, and surgical staplers and Loctite, a specialty adhesives maker, left town in the mid-1990s. The building of Interstate 91 and Interstate 84 earlier in the century had affected Newington businesses adversely by making other cities and towns more attractive to industry and but for the success of shopping centers, condominium development, and the continued commercial activity of the Berlin Turnpike, Newington might have seen a sharper economic decline as the twentieth century came to an end.

Newington's population had increased to 29,701 in 2009 and was projected to surpass 30,000 by 2013. The town remained mostly residential with the exception of the Berlin Turnpike, which witnessed a renewed proliferation of commercial enterprises. Reflecting the conspicuous nature of technological advancement, the Turnpike, by the start of the new century, saw the replacement of small businesses with new and larger chain stores.

== Geography ==
According to the United States Census Bureau, the town has a total area of 13.1 square miles (34.0 km^{2}). None of the area is covered with water, except for two small ponds, found in the town's largest parks, and various small streams. The town of Newington is bordered by the capital city of Hartford to the north, as well as the suburbs of (clockwise from Hartford) Wethersfield, Rocky Hill, Berlin, New Britain, Farmington, and West Hartford. The town consists mostly of residential areas, although it is also home to the Berlin Turnpike, a large, commercial highway.

== Demographics ==
Historical population
Census	Pop.	Note	%±
1880	934		—
1890	953		2.0%
1900	1,041		9.2%
1910	1,689		62.2%
1920	2,381		41.0%
1930	4,572		92.0%
1940	5,449		19.2%
1950	9,110		67.2%
1960	17,664		93.9%
1970	26,037		47.4%
1980	28,841		10.8%
1990	29,208		1.3%
2000	29,306		0.3%
2010	30,562		4.3%
2020	30,536		−0.1%
U.S. Decennial Census

As of the census of 2010, there were 30,562 people, 13,011 households, and 8,253 families residing in the town. The population density was 2,310/sq mi. There were 12,699 housing units at an average density of 930.4 per square mile. The racial makeup of the town was 86.5% White, 3.5% Black or African American, 0.2% Native American, 5.7% Asian, 0.0% Pacific Islander, 1.20% from other races, and 2% from two or more races. 7.6% of the population were Hispanic or Latino of any race.

There were 13,011 households, out of which 19.8% had children under the age of 18 living with them, 50.7% were married couples living together, 11.3% had a female householder with no husband present, and 34.3% were non-families. 28.8% of all households were made up of individuals, and 12.4% had someone living alone who was 65 years of age or older. The average household size was 2.4 and the average family size was 2.97.

In the town, the population was spread out, with 21.9% under the age of 19, 5% from 20 to 24, 25.3% from 25 to 44, 29.4% from 45 to 64, and 18.5% who were 65 years of age or older. The median age was 44 years. For every 100 females, there were 88.7 males. For every 100 females age 18 and over, there were 84.0 males.

The median income for a household in the town was $75,237, and the median income for a family was $79,792. Males had a median income of $43,475 versus $35,601 for females. The per capita income for the town was $33,745. 3.5% of the population and 4.6% of families were below the poverty line. Out of the total population, 3.7% of those under the age of 18 and 3.2% of those 65 and older were living below the poverty line. The median home value was $235,300.

== Arts and culture ==
=== Mill Pond Falls ===
The town seal depicts Mill Pond Falls, named for a sawmill that was built there in 1860. The 16-foot (4.9 m) high falls, located in central Newington at Mill Pond Park, is the smallest natural waterfall in the country. A walking path that encircles Mill Pond includes a footbridge which crosses over the waterfall. There is also an observation area with benches at the base of the falls. The park is popular with local residents as a place to walk dogs, ice skate, jog, and picnic; it also hosts the occasional wedding party and festivals. It is open year-round.

Starting in 2000, the Newington Waterfall Committee has celebrated the famed waterfall through the Waterfall Festival, held every September in the center of town. The festival features over 72 vendors and local music groups, as well as the "Artist's Chalk Walk" in which artists of all ages compete to create the best chalk drawing while passersby attend the festival. On April 17, 2010, the Newington Waterfall Committee agreed to plant a Crimson Maple dubbed the "Thankful Tree" at the falls, giving Newington residents the chance to write on tags what they are thankful for.

=== Library ===
The Lucy Robbins Welles Library opened in 1939, and was renovated and expanded in 1988.

=== Notable locations ===
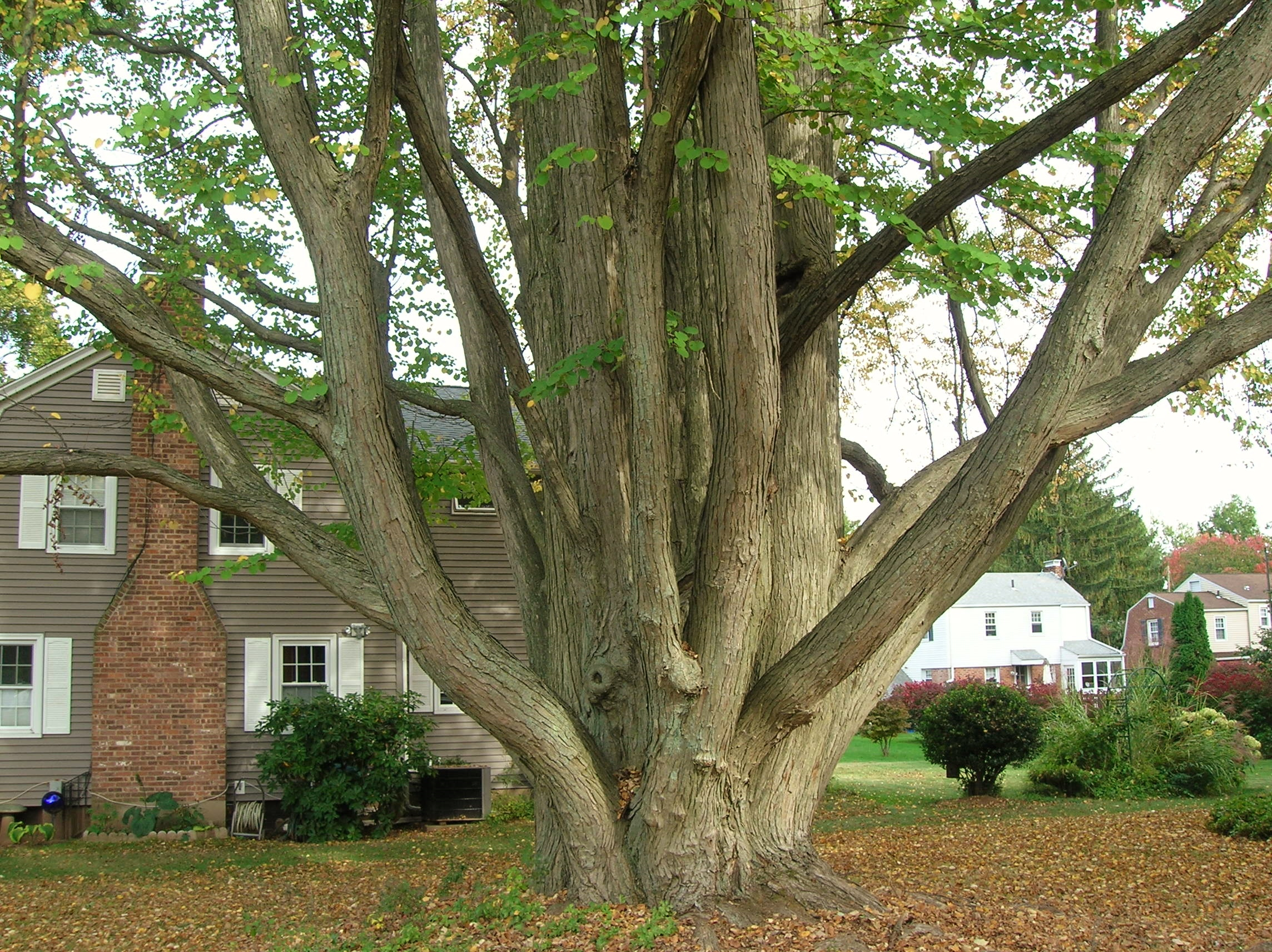
Katsura Tree in Newington

- Gen. Martin Kellogg House, built in 1808 and added to the National Register of Historic Places in 1987
- The National Iwo Jima Memorial, located on Ella Grasso Boulevard on the Newington and New Britain town line
- The Newington Junction North, South, and West Historic Districts
- Newington Junction Railroad Depot, built in 1870 and added to the National Register of Historic Places in 1986
- Willard Homestead (Newington, Connecticut), built in 1730 and added to the National Register of Historic Places in 1986
- Hiram Percy Maxim Memorial Station (amateur radio station W1AW), on the grounds of the American Radio Relay League, built in 1938.
- Newington Junction contains three historic districts and the Newington Junction Railroad Depot.

== Government ==
Newington town vote by party in presidential elections
Year	Democratic	Republican	Third Parties
2024	55.02% 9,253	43.15% 7,258	1.83% 308
2020	57.81% 10,031	40.77% 7,074	1.42% 247
2016	53.69% 8,425	41.79% 6,557	4.52% 709
2012	59.65% 8,792	39.03% 5,752	1.32% 195
2008	62.38% 9,875	36.17% 5,726	1.45% 230
2004	59.08% 9,365	39.44% 6,252	1.48% 235
2000	62.42% 9,612	33.21% 5,115	4.37% 673
1996	57.27% 8,471	30.04% 4,443	12.70% 1,878
1992	45.69% 7,687	33.28% 5,598	21.03% 3,538
1988	52.36% 8,109	46.74% 7,238	0.90% 140
1984	41.94% 6,523	57.61% 8,960	0.45% 70
1980	41.70% 6,369	42.51% 6,493	15.79% 2,411
1976	49.06% 7,173	50.26% 7,349	0.68% 99
1972	42.05% 5,903	57.03% 8,007	0.92% 129
1968	51.76% 5,991	43.24% 5,005	4.99% 578
1964	69.26% 7,128	30.74% 3,164	0.00% 0
1960	50.37% 4,656	49.63% 4,588	0.00% 0
1956	32.29% 2,421	67.71% 5,076	0.00% 0

Newington received its Charter from the State of Connecticut in 1871 and is currently governed under the Council-Manager form of government, a system that combines the policy leadership of elected officials in the form of a Town Council, with the professional, managerial, and leadership expertise of an appointed Town Manager. The Town Council is the legislative body for the Town of Newington, and nine members are elected to serve two year terms. The Town Council meets on the second and fourth Tuesday of each month.

The Mayor, elected separately, is a member and presiding official of the council with the power to vote. Recognized as the official head of the Town for ceremonial and military purposes, the Mayor has the authority to appoint the Town Attorney, Director of Health and Clerk of the council.

=== State Government ===
The Connecticut Department of Transportation has its headquarters in Newington. The United States Postal Service operates the Newington Post Office.

== Education ==
Newington Public Schools operates public schools in Newington CT.

There are seven public schools in Newington. There are four elementary schools, which teach kindergarten through fourth grade. Children attend the elementary school which is located in the district in which they reside. The names of the elementary schools are Elizabeth Green, Anna Reynolds, John Paterson, and Ruth Chaffee. There are also two middle schools in town, Martin Kellogg and John Wallace, which teach grades five through eight. Newington High School is attended by graduates of both middle schools and teaches grades nine through twelve.

Private schools in Newington include Emmanuel Christian Academy (Connecticut), which teaches Kindergarten through Grade 6.

The Connecticut Distance Learning Consortium was located in Newington before closing in 2018.

=== Newington High School ===
Founded in the early 1930s, Newington High School moved to new building in the 1950s, and the 1970s. The former 1950s Newington Senior High School was renovated and is now used as the town hall and the police department.

== Economy ==
=== Top employers ===
Top employers in Newington according to the town's 2024 Comprehensive Annual Financial Report

#	Employer	# of Employees
1	Hartford Hospital-Newington Campus	1,481
2	Town of Newington	1,175
3	Connecticut Department of Transportation	1,082
4	Data-Mail Inc	554
5	Stew Leonard's	290
6	Newington Rapid Recovery Health Care Center	257
7	Veterans Administration Hospital	238
8	Davidson Specialty Foods, LLC	230
9	Walmart	210
10	Target	208

== Infrastructure ==
=== Transportation ===
==== Railroad ====
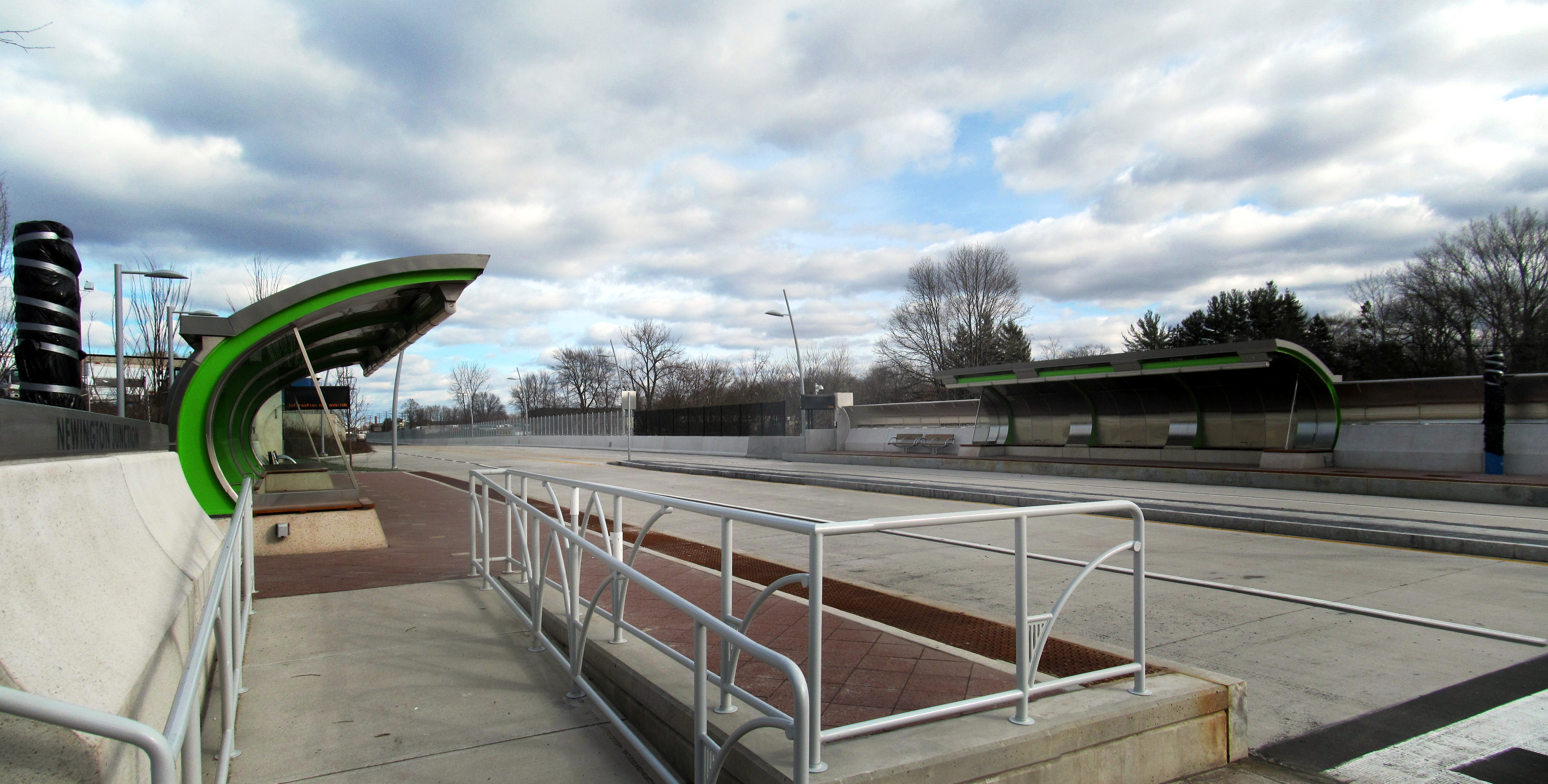
Newington Junction CTfastrak station under construction

Although Amtrak does not currently serve Newington directly, the town center is located approximately 8 miles (13 km) south of Hartford's Union Station. Additionally, Newington is a planned stop along the Hartford Line, a proposed commuter rail service from New Haven to Springfield that will use existing tracks, with a possible shuttle bus connection in Windsor Locks for Bradley International Airport. As of December 2015, funding has been secured to finance the construction of the new line, with service scheduled to begin in early 2018. The State of Connecticut has secured funding for restoration of the Newington Junction Railroad Depot, a passenger rail station located off Willard Avenue (CT-173) in the Newington Junction neighborhood. Although the first train station was built on the site in 1850, rail service was discontinued in 1959.

==== Bus rapid transit ====
In March 2015, CTfastrak, Connecticut's first bus rapid transit corridor opened, providing a separated right-of-way between Hartford and New Britain with a stop at Newington Junction. The station consists of two side platforms serving the busway, with two center passing lanes to allow express buses to pass buses stopped at the station. It opened with the line on March 28, 2015.

==== Buses ====
Newington is served by a few bus routes operated by Connecticut Transit, including the 69, 41, 47 and 45. Additionally, the 907 Newington Express provides express service to downtown Hartford.

=== Emergency services ===
Newington is served by the Connecticut State Police, the local municipal police, and the United States Department of Veterans' Affairs Police Department. The municipal police department consists of 52 full-time sworn officers, who also act as the town's first responders for medical emergencies. All officers have gone through first responder training once more to implement the use of new automatic external defibrillators that will be carried in their vehicles.

The town has an incorporated volunteer ambulance service, that provides basic life support and transport services Monday through Friday from 6:00 pm – 6:00 am and weekends 24 hours. Advanced life support and transport during all other times is provided by American Medical Response. With this system the taxpayers get charged one bill sent by the volunteer ambulance with the Advance Life Support charge included. This system is used by several surrounding towns in the Greater Hartford Area.

The town is served by a fire department that is 100% volunteer and was founded in 1917. Besides the school system, it is the only part of town government that is not under the control of the Town Council or Town Manager. The volunteer fire department is run by an elected board of three fire commissioners, which appoints the fire marshal, the chief, and all officers. A study was undertaken during the administration of former town manager Paul Fetherston that recommended eliminating the board of fire commissioners and placing the department under the control of the town manager. During the 2008 round of Charter Revision, both the immediate past mayor (Mortenson) and current town manager (Salomone) brought up the topic of the fire services organizational structure.

== Notable people ==
- Amy Archer-Gilligan (1873–1962), nursing home proprietor and serial killer who ran a home for the elderly in town from 1904 to 1907
- Ed Cody (1923–1994), NFL player for Green Bay Packers and Chicago Bears from 1947 to 1950, born in Newington
- Melanie Fontana (born 1986), singer, composer and songwriter signed to Universal Music Group
- Richard P. Freeman (1869–1944), Spanish–American War veteran and US congressman, died in town
- Albert Magnoli (born 1953/1954), American film director, screenwriter and editor best known for helming the films Purple Rain, Tango & Cash, Street Knight, and American Anthem, and editing Reckless
- John Pezzenti (1952–2007), wildlife photographer born in town
- Lindy Remigino (born 1931), gold medalist (100 meters & 4 × 100 meters) 1952 Olympics
- Bill Rodgers (born 1947), attended Newington High School was a four-time winner of the Boston Marathon (1975, 1978, 1979, 1980), also won New York City Marathon (1976–1980)
- Wilber G. Smith (1935–1992), state senator
