= Denmark Strait overflow =

Underwater waterfall in the Atlantic

Location of the Denmark Strait (shaded in dark blue), where the overflow is located

The Denmark Strait overflow (Danish: Grønlandspumpen; Norwegian: Grønlandspumpa, meaning "the Greenland pump") is an undersea overflow located in the Denmark Strait between Greenland and Iceland. The overflow transports around 3.2 million m^{3} (110 million ft^{3}) of water per second, greatly eclipsing the discharge of the Amazon River into the Atlantic Ocean and the flow rate of the former Guaíra Falls. The descending column of water is approximately 200 m (660 ft) wide and 200 m (660 ft) thick and descends over a length of around 1,000 km (620 mi).

The overflow is formed by the density difference of the water masses either side of the Denmark Strait; the southward-flowing water originating from the Nordic Seas is colder and consequently more dense than the Irminger Sea to the south of the strait. At the Greenland–Iceland Rise – an elevated ridge forming the overflow's apex – the colder water cascades along the seafloor to a depth of around 3,000 m (10,000 ft). Due to the Coriolis effect, the downward flow of water is deflected to the right, resulting in the descending water on the Greenland side of the channel being roughly 1 km (0.62 mi) higher than the opposite side of the channel.

The overflow provides one of the main inflows of North Atlantic Deep Water, accounting for around half of dense water overflow between the Nordic Seas and the North Atlantic. The dense and cold water mass that spills across the overflow, known as Denmark Strait Overflow Water (DSOW), is thought to originate from the modification of water masses in the eastern Nordic Sea, the Greenland Sea, and the Iceland Sea. The North Icelandic Jet and two branches of the East Greenland Current transport the dense water to and across the overflow. DSOW is a key component of the present-day thermohaline circulation and may influence the Atlantic Multidecadal Oscillation.

Although undersea overflows are not considered waterfalls, the Denmark Strait overflow would be the tallest waterfall in the world were it on land, with water falling over 3.5 km (2.2 mi); this descent is over three times the height of Angel Falls, the world's tallest uninterrupted waterfall over land.
