= North Icelandic Jet =

Deep-reaching current that flows along the continental slope of Iceland

Coordinates: 66.457°N 24.586°W

The North Icelandic Jet is a deep-reaching current that flows along the continental slope of Iceland. The North Icelandic Jet advects overflow water into the Denmark Strait and constitutes a pathway that is distinct from the East Greenland Current. It is a cold current that runs west across the top of Iceland, then southwest between Greenland and Iceland at a depth of about 600 m (2,000 ft). The North Icelandic Jet is deep and narrow (about 12 mi (19 km) wide) and can carry more than a million cubic meters of water per second.

It was not discovered until 2004. It was initially studied and described by two Icelandic Marine Research Institute’s specialists, Steingrímur Jónsson (also a professor at the University of Akureyri, and Hédinn Valdimarsson).

The current was found to be a key element of the Atlantic Meridional Overturning Circulation.
