= Mill Pond Falls =

Waterfall in Newington, Connecticut

Coordinates: 41.69429°N 72.73064°W

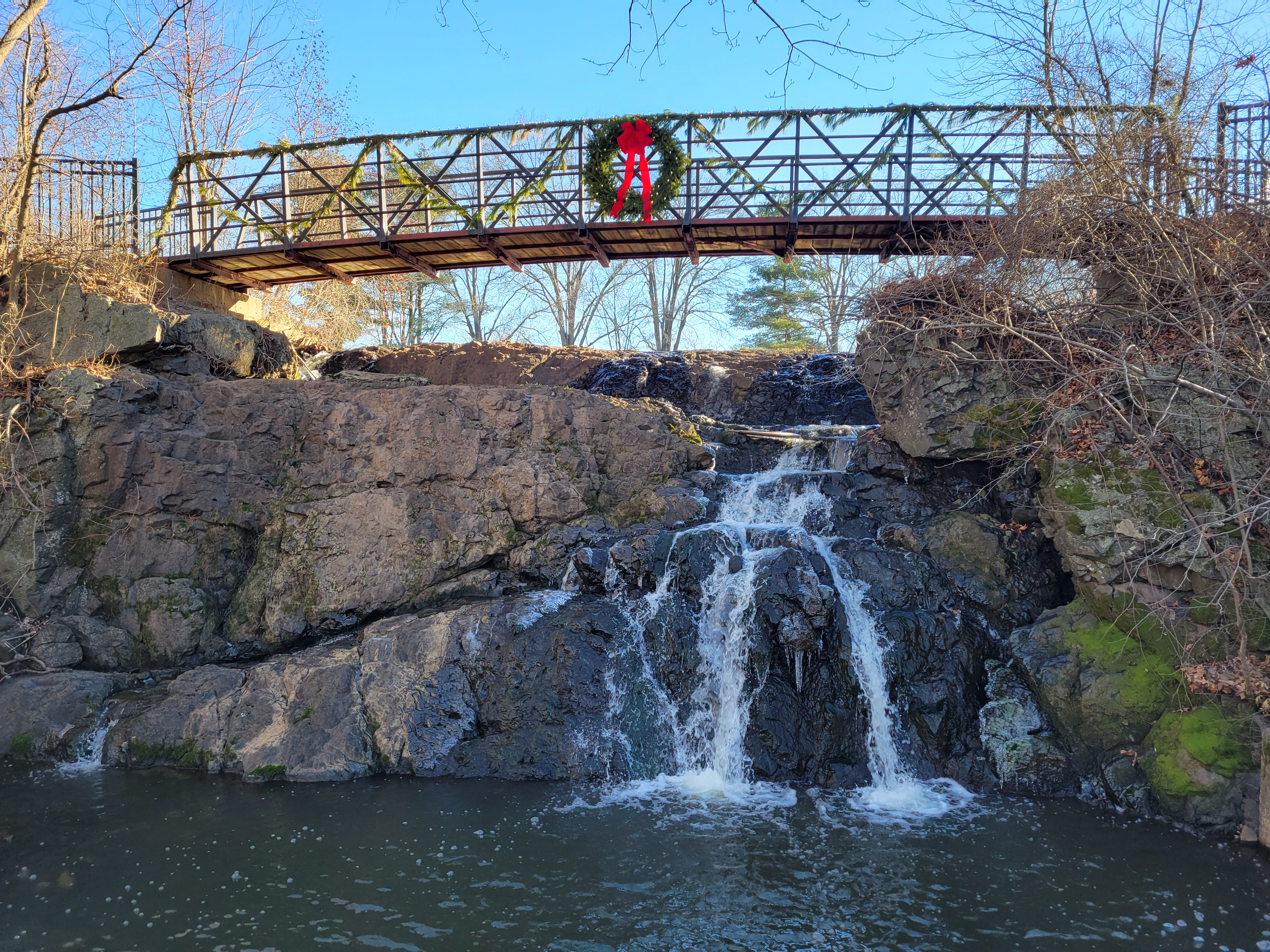
Mill Pond Falls

Mill Pond Falls is a waterfall located in Newington, Connecticut. It is promoted by residents as the "smallest natural waterfall in the United States". The falls are located inside Mill Pond Park and is celebrated each fall during the Waterfall Festival.

== Description ==
Mill Pond Falls is located under Mill Pond inside Mill Pond Park. A walking path surrounds the pond and runs through the woods down to the falls. A wooden footbridge spans the top of the falls and an observation area is located in front of it where benches offer a view of the falls.

In the park, residents are able to fish, walk, bike, and swim in the public pool. A gazebo provides a view of the pond's drop off into the falls. In the summer, the Newington Extravaganza allows patrons to ride boats around the pond and past the falls. A well maintained landscape and small garden close to the falls make it a very popular location for weddings and other ceremonies. During the Christmas season, the bridge and observation area are decorated with Christmas lights and other decorations.

Mill Pond Falls is 5 meters (16 feet) high. Its water flow is 16 liters (4 gallons) per second as of February 24, 2002.

On April 17, 2010, the Newington Waterfall Committee planted a Crimson Maple in front of the falls. They dubbed it the "Thankful Tree" and it gives residents the opportunity to express their thanks.

== History ==
Mill Pond Falls was named for a saw mill built on Mill Pond in 1860. At that time, Newington was still a part of the town of Wethersfield and its economy was based on the production of pipestaves for whiskey barrels. Saw mills were involved in the production of pipestaves, and therefore essential to town economy. The falls were used as a source for energy for the mill, and their beauty and fame were overlooked for the time being. Mill Pond Falls' contribution to Newington's economy is honored by the Newington Town Seal, on which the falls are the focal point. Today, the sawmill is replaced by the town garage, yet the falls remain. Over the years, the town has taken advantage of the falls' natural beauty by surrounding it with Mill Pond Park, a facility that allows residents to visit and view the falls.

== Celebration ==
Beginning in 2000, the Newington Waterfall Committee decided to honor the falls' fame and contribution to town history by starting the Waterfall Festival. The festival is held every fall in the center of town. It features over 70 vendors, as well as music groups from local public schools. Town organizations and local companies sponsor the event each year. The event also includes the famous "Artist's Chalk Walk". This contest invites artists in two groups; adult and children; to compete for prizes. Residents take part by voting for their favorite creation.

== See also ==
- List of waterfalls
