= Connecticut Distance Learning Consortium =

State agency of Connecticut, US

- CTDLC

Agency overview
- Formed: October 1996
- Dissolved: 2018
- Headquarters: 85 Alumni Road, Newington, CT
- Employees: <20
- Agency executive: Kevin Corcoran, Executive Director
- Parent agency: Charter Oak State College

The Connecticut Distance Learning Consortium (CTDLC) was a State of Connecticut agency that supported online learning in Connecticut. Although not a college, it hosted and provided services to Connecticut's colleges and universities to make it easier for them to offer online courses and degree programs. They also provided the same services for institutions outside the state of Connecticut. CTDLC shut down in 2018 due to lack of profitability.

== History ==
The Consortium was created in October 1996 when over thirty colleges and universities met and agreed that Connecticut needed to systematically mount distance deliverable education.

In 2018, Charter Oak State College president Ed Klonoski said the following about CTDLC closing: “the current economic landscape makes it tough to achieve sufficient profitability to make the investments in technology and talent that [the Consortium's] service set requires."

== Student Services ==
The CTDLC gave students information about online learning, including:

- Listing of all online courses available from Connecticut's colleges and universities, including registration, tuition & fees, and pre-requisites
- Listing of all online degree programs available at Connecticut's college and universities
- Listing of all online certificate programs available at Connecticut's college and universities
- Financial Aid information
- Online tutoring (not offered at all colleges)
- Links to all of the Connecticut's colleges and universities that offer online education
- Free Sample online course
- General facts and information about online learning
- Online help desk
- Hosting of Learning Management Systems

== Faculty Services ==
The CTDLC website offers a variety of services for faculty, including training programs and grant opportunities.

== Business Services ==
The CTDLC was available to help the business community with their online needs, including building web applications and converting face-to-face training into e-learning.
