= Overflow (oceanography) =

Type of deep-water circulation

In oceanography, an overflow is a type of deep-water circulation in which denser water flows into an adjacent basin beneath lighter water. This process is significant in thermohaline circulation, contributing to the global ocean's deep water mass formation. Overflows influence global climate by transporting heat and salt, impacting sea levels, and affecting marine ecosystems.

Overflows are driven by differences in water density, usually due to variations in temperature and salinity. A classic example is the Denmark Strait overflow, where cold, dense water from the Nordic Seas flows into the North Atlantic Ocean.
