= John Pezzenti =

American photographer and murder victim

John Pezzenti Jr.
- Born: June 12, 1952; Newington, Connecticut, United States
- Died: December 3, 2007 (aged 55); Anchorage, Alaska, United States
- Known for: Wildlife photography
- Patrons: Ronald Reagan

John Pezzenti Jr. (June 12, 1952 – December 3, 2007) was an American wildlife photographer born in Newington, Connecticut, but who spent much of his life taking pictures of wildlife in the Alaskan wilderness.

== Background ==
He moved to Alaska in 1976, working on the Alaskan pipeline and owning and running a lodge at Kenai Lake during the 1970s. Pezzenti then began working as an independent wildlife photographer and published three photography books during his life. Some of his photos hung in the Oval Office during the presidency of Ronald Reagan. He had his photos published in many different magazines, including National Geographic, Alaska Magazine, Reader's Digest, and Natural History. He also spoke at events at the World Trade Center and the Smithsonian Institution.

== Death ==
He was found by police shot to death at his home in Anchorage, Alaska on December 3, 2007. Police have not yet determined a clear motive or found a solid suspect. The story of his murder has been aired as a featured segment on the weekly television series America's Most Wanted twice (as well as once on an AMW radio segment).

== See also ==
- List of unsolved murders (2000–present)

== Works ==
Pezzenti published three books of his photography.

Alaska: A Photographic Journey Through the Last Wilderness
ISBN 978-0-670-87094-3, November 1, 2007, Studio Publishing

The American Eagle
ISBN 978-0-670-88448-3, September 1, 1999, Studio Publishing

Shooting Bears: The Adventures of a Wildlife Photographer
ISBN 978-0-7893-1042-2, September 20, 2003, Rizzoli International Publications
