= Denmark Strait =

Strait between Greenland and Iceland

Coordinates: 67°N 24°W

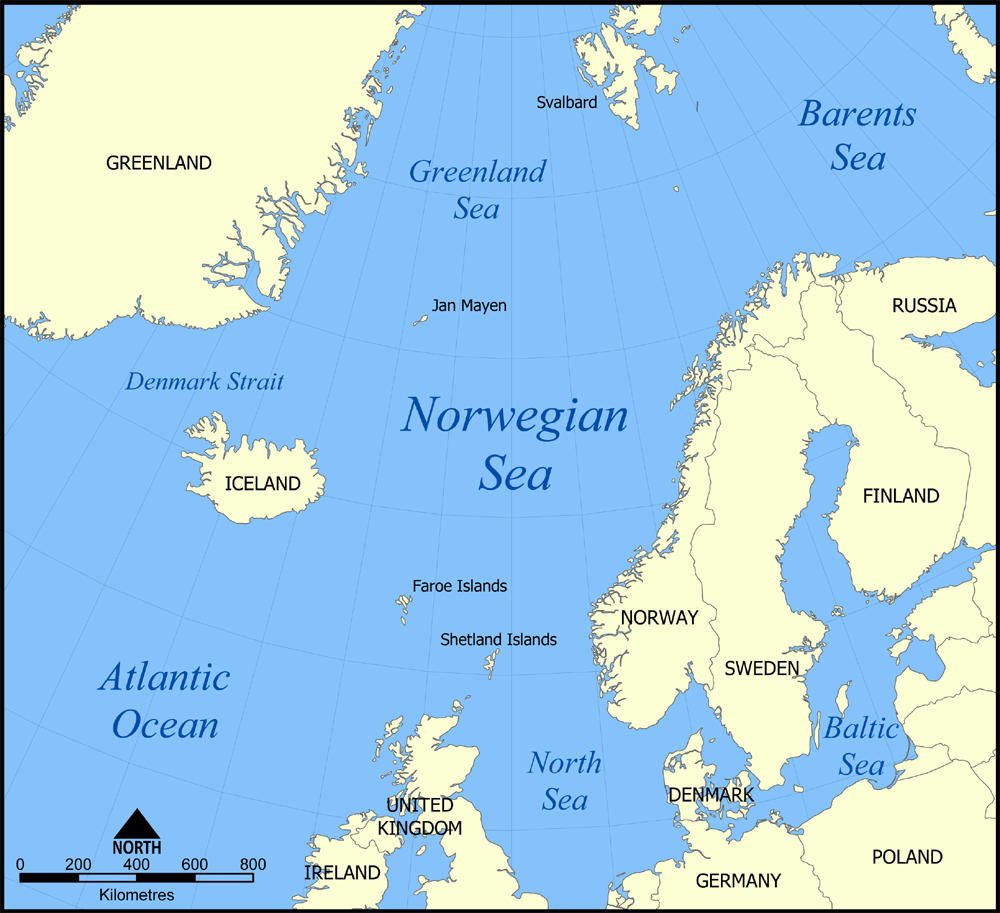
Map showing the Denmark Strait

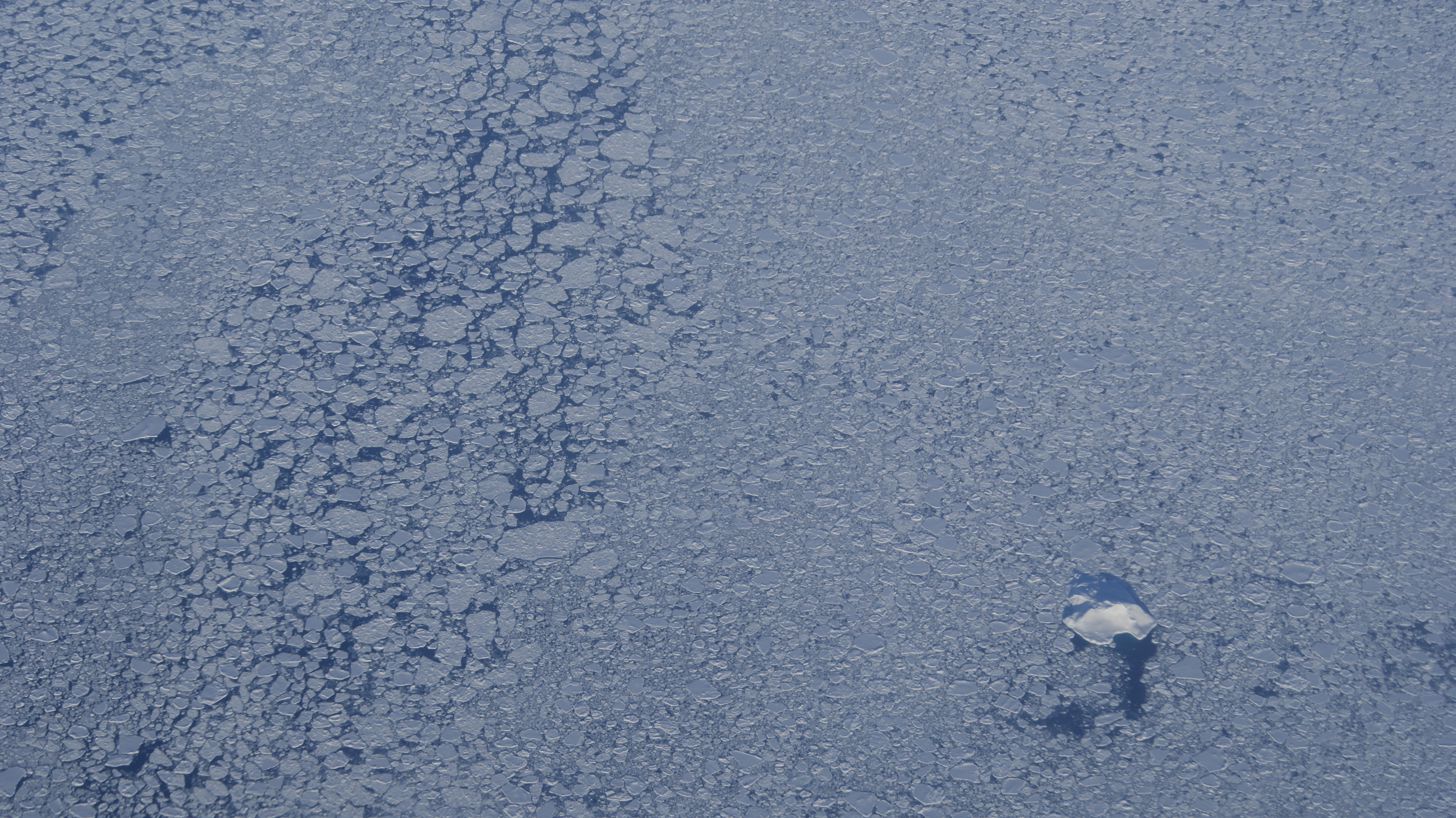
Pack ice in the Denmark Strait

The Denmark Strait (Note: Known in Danish as the Danmarksstrædet ("Denmark Strait") and in Icelandic as the Grænlandssund ("Greenland Sound").) is the strait that separates Greenland from Iceland.

== Geography ==
The strait connects the Greenland Sea, an extension of the Arctic Ocean, to the Irminger Sea, a part of the Atlantic Ocean. It is 480 km (300 miles) long. The narrowest part of the strait is 290 km (180 miles) wide and lies between Straumnes, on Iceland's Hornstrandir peninsula, and Cape Tupinier, on Greenland's Blosseville Coast. According to the International Hydrographic Organization, the dividing line between the Arctic and the North Atlantic oceans runs from Straumnes to Cape Nansen, 132 km (82 miles) southwest of Cape Tupinier.

== Hydrography ==
The narrow depth, where the Greenland–Iceland Rise runs along the bottom of the sea, is 190 m (625 feet; 100 fathoms). The cold East Greenland Current passes through the strait; it flows southeastward along the Greenland coast and carries icebergs into the North Atlantic. It hosts important fisheries.

The world's largest known underwater waterfall, known as the Denmark Strait cataract, flows down the western side of the Denmark Strait.

== Battle of the Denmark Strait ==
During World War II, the Battle of the Denmark Strait took place on 24 May 1941. The German battleship Bismarck, seeking to reach the North Atlantic to raid Allied convoys, sank the pursuing British battlecruiser HMS Hood, which exploded with the loss of all but three of her 1,418 crew; the battleship HMS Prince of Wales was seriously damaged in the engagement. Bismarck was able to enter the Atlantic through the Strait, but damage sustained in the battle—combined with British aircraft search-and-destroy missions—led to her own sinking three days later. The German heavy cruiser Prinz Eugen accompanying the Bismarck was able to evade its British pursuers, escape into the North Atlantic, and return to safety at Brest.

== See also ==
- Aquatic sill
- GIUK gap
