= Alphonse (given name) =

Alphonse, also spelled Alfonse, is the French variant of the given name Alfonso. People called Alphonse or Alfonse include:

== In arts, entertainment, and media ==
=== Film, television, and theatre ===
- Alphonse Beni (1946-2023), Cameroonian actor and movie director
- Alphonse Boudard (1925–2000), French novelist and playwright
- Alphonse Ouimet (1908–1988), Canadian television pioneer and president of the Canadian Broadcasting Corporation from 1958 to 1967
- Alphonse Royer (1803–1875), French author, dramatist and theatre manager

=== Music ===
- Alphonse "Bois Sec" Ardoin (1915–2007), American accordionist
- Alphonse Duvernoy (1842–1907), French pianist and composer
- Alphonse Hasselmans (1845–1912), Belgian-born French harpist, composer and pedagogue
- Alphonse Joseph (composer), Indian film score composer
- Alphonse Martin (1884–1947), Canadian organist, pianist and music educator
- Alphonse Mouzon (1948–2016), American jazz fusion drummer and percussionist
- Alphonse Picou (1878–1961), American early jazz clarinetist
- Alphonse Trent (1905–1959), American jazz pianist and territory band leader
- Alphonse Varney (1811–1879), French conductor

=== Plastic arts ===
- Alphonse Révillon d'Apreval (1851–1915), French botanical illustrator and lithographer
- Alphonse Balat (1819–1895), Belgian architect
- Alfonse Borysewicz (born 1957), American painter
- Alphonse Colas (1818–1887), French painter
- Alphonse de Cailleux (1788–1876), French painter, connoisseur, arts administrator and director of the Musée du Louvre
- Alphonse de Neuville (1835–1885), French Academic painter
- Alphonse Giroux (1775–1848), French painter
- Alphonse Kann (1870–1948), prominent French art collector of Jewish heritage
- Alphonse Lami (1822–1867), French sculptor
- Alphonse Laverrière (1872–1954), Swiss architect
- Alphonse Legros (1837–1911), French painter, etcher and sculptor
- Alphonse Mucha (1860–1939), Czech Art Nouveau painter and decorative artist
- Alphonse Osbert (1857–1939), French Symbolist painter

=== Writing and journalism ===
- Alphonse Allais (1854–1905), French writer and humorist
- Alphonse Boudard (1925–2000), French novelist and playwright
- Alphonse Daudet (1840–1897), French novelist
- Alphonse de Châteaubriant (1877–1951), French writer
- Alphonse de Lamartine (1790–1869), French writer, poet and politician
- Alphonse Lemerre (1838–1912), French editor and publisher
- Alphonse Rabbe (1784–1829), French writer, historian, critic and journalist
- Alphonse Royer (1803–1875), French author, dramatist and theatre manager
- Alphonse Tavan (1833–1905), French Provençal poet
- Alphonse Toussenel (1803–1885), French writer and journalist

== In business and finance ==
- Alphonse Bertrand (1846–1926), merchant and political figure in New Brunswick
- Alphonse James de Rothschild (1827–1905), French financier, vineyard owner, art collector, philanthropist and racehorse owner and breeder
- Alphonse Desjardins (co-operator) (1854–1920), founder of Mouvement Desjardins credit unions
- Alphonse Raymond (1884–1958), Quebec businessman, financier and public official

== In engineering and industrial design ==
- Alphonse Chapanis (1917–2002), American pioneer in the field of industrial design
- Alphonse Loubat (1799–1866), French inventor who developed improvements in tram and rail equipment
- Alphonse Munchen (1850–1917), Luxembourgish engineer and politician
- Alphonse Pénaud (1850–1880), French pioneer of aviation
- Alphonse Poitevin (1819–1882), French chemist, photographer and civil engineer
- Alphonse Sagebien (1807–1892), French hydrological engineer

== In government, law, military, and politics ==
=== Africa ===
==== Congo ====
- Alphonse Massamba-Débat (1921–1977), political figure of the Republic of the Congo who led the country from 1963 until 1968
- Alphonse Poaty-Souchlaty (1941–2024), politician of the Republic of the Congo

==== Other African countries ====
- Alphonse Alley (1930–1987), Beninese army officer and political figure
- Alphonse Barancira, former minister for Human Rights, Constitutional Reform and Relations with the National Assembly of Burundi
- Alphonse Koyamba (1941–1998), Central African economist and politician
- Alphonse Kotiga, 20th century Chadian military officer and politician
- Alfonse Owiny-Dollo (born 1956), Ugandan lawyer, judge and Chief Justice of Uganda
- Alphonse Yokadouma, Central African politician and clerk

=== Europe ===
==== France ====
- Alphonse, Count of Poitiers (1220–1271)
- Alphonse Joseph Georges (1875–1951), French army officer
- Alphonse Henri d'Hautpoul (1789–1865), French army general and Prime Minister of France during the French Second Republic
- Alphonse Juin (1888–1967), Marshal of France
- Alphonse de Lamartine (1790–1869), French writer, poet and politician
- Alphonse de Tonty, Baron de Paludy (c. 1659–1727)

==== Other European countries ====
- Alphonse Berns (born 1952), Luxembourgish diplomat and current Ambassador to Belgium and Permanent Representative to NATO
- Alphonse de Tonty (ca. 1659–1727), Italian officer who served under the French explorer Cadillac
- Alphonse Munchen (1850–1917)), Luxembourgish engineer and politician

=== North America ===
==== Canada ====
- Alphonse Bernier (1861–1944), Canadian lawyer, judge and provincial politician
- Alphonse Bertrand (1846–1926), merchant and political figure in New Brunswick
- Alphonse Desjardins (politician) (1841–1912), mayor of Montreal and Canadian cabinet minister
- Alphonse Fournier (1893–1961), Canadian politician
- Alphonse Alfred Clément Larivière (1842–1925), Canadian politician and journalist
- Alphonse Raymond (1884–1958), Quebec businessman, financier and public official
- Alphonse George Tisdelle, Canadian politician
- Alphonse Verville (1864–1921), Canadian politician and trade unionist

==== United States ====
- Al D'Amato (born 1937), American attorney, lobbyist and politician
- Alphonse Girandy (1868–1941), United States Navy sailor
- Alphonse S. Marotta (1934–2024), American politician in Connecticut
- Alphonse Roy (1897–1967), American Representative from New Hampshire

== In organized crime ==
- Alphonse Attardi (1892–1970), New York mobster
- Al Capone (1899–1947), Italian-American gangster who led a Prohibition-era crime syndicate
- Alphonse D'Arco (1932–2019), New York mobster
- Alphonse Gangitano (1957–1998), Italian Australian organised crime identity from Templestowe, a suburb of Melbourne
- Alphonse Indelicato (1931–1981), powerful caporegime in New York City's Bonanno crime family
- Alphonse Malangone (born 1936), New York City mobster and caporegime in the Genovese crime family
- Alphonse Persico, former acting boss of the Colombo crime family from the 1980s and 1990s

== In religion and mysticism ==
- Alphonse Constant (1810–1875), birth name of Éliphas Lévi, French occult author and purported magician
- Alphonse Favier (1837–1905), controversial Roman Catholic Lazarite Vicar Apostolic of Northern Chi-Li, China
- Alphonse Gallegos (1931–1991), American Roman Catholic bishop
- Alphonse Joseph Glorieux (1844–1917), Belgian missionary Roman Catholic bishop
- Alphonse Magnien (1837–1902), superior at St. Mary's Seminary and University in Baltimore, Maryland from 1878 to 1902
- Alphonse Mingana (1878–1937), Assyrian theologian, historian, orientalist and former priest
- Alphonse James Schladweiler (1902–1996), American Roman Catholic prelate
- Alphonse John Smith (1883–1935), American Roman Catholic bishop

== In science, medicine, and academia ==
=== Cultural sciences ===
- Alphonse Mingana (1878–1937), Assyrian theologian, historian, orientalist and former priest
- Alphonse Pinart (1852–1911), French explorer, philologist and ethnographer
- Alphonse Rabbe (1784–1829), French writer, historian, critic and journalist
- Alphonse Roque-Ferrier (1844–1907), French philologist and historian of the Occitan language

=== Geology and earth science ===
- Alphonse Briart (1825–1898), Belgian coal mine supervisor and geologist
- Alphonse Francois Renard (1842–1903), Belgian geologist and petrographer

=== Life sciences and medicine ===
- Alphonse Bertillon (1853–1914), French police officer and biometrics researcher who created the field of anthropometry
- Alphonse Pyramus de Candolle (1806–1893), French-Swiss botanist
- Alphonse Dochez (1882–1964), American physician and disease researcher
- Alphonse Guérin (1816–1895), French surgeon
- Alphonse Hustache (1872–1949), French entomologist
- Alphonse Milne-Edwards (1835–1900), French mammalologist, ornithologist and carcinologist

=== Other disciplines ===
- Alphonse Borrelly (1842–1926), French astronomer
- Alphonse de Polignac (1817–1890), French mathematician
- Alphonse Lavallée (1791–1873), the founder of the École Centrale Paris
- Alphonse Magnien (1837–1902), the superior at St. Mary's Seminary and University in Baltimore, Maryland from 1878 to 1902
- Alphonse Poitevin (1819–1882), French chemist, photographer and civil engineer

== In sport ==
=== Football (soccer) ===
- Alphonse Areola (born 1993), French footballer
- Alphonse Decorte (1909–1977), Belgian footballer
- Alphonse Leweck (born 1981), Luxembourgish footballer
- Alphonse Renier, Belgian footballer
- Alphonse Six (1890–1914), Belgian footballer
- Alphonse Tchami (born 1971), Cameroonian retired footballer
- Alphonse Yombi (born 1969), Cameroonian former footballer

=== Winter sports ===
- Alphonse Hörning, Swiss bobsledder
- Alphonse Jetté (1887–?), Canadian ice hockey player
- Alphonse Lacroix (1897–1973), American ice hockey goaltender

=== Other sports ===
- Alphonse Antoine (1915–1999), French road bicycle racer
- Alphonse Burnand (1896–1981), American sailor
- Alphonse Castex (1899–1969), French rugby union player
- Alphonse Dotson (born 1943), former American football player
- Alphonse Ducatillon, Belgian tug of war competitor
- Alphonse Gemuseus (1898–?), Swiss Olympic equestrian
- Alphonse Halimi (1932–2006), French world champion bantamweight boxer
- Al Hunter (American football) (born 1955), American former National Football League player
- Alphonse Kirchhoffer (1873–1913), French fencer
- Alphonse Martin (water polo) (born 1930), Belgian water polo player
- Alphonse Ruckstuhl (1901–?), Swiss Olympic fencer
- Alphonse Schepers (1907–1984), Belgian racing cyclist
- Alphonse Van Mele (1891–1972), Belgian gymnast
- Alphonse Yanghat (1947–2018), Congolese Olympic sprinter
- Phonney Martin (1845–1943), American baseball player

== In other fields ==
- Alphonse Goetz (1865–1934), French chess master
- Alphonse Le Gastelois (1914–2012), a Jerseyman who became a hermit on the Écréhous islands to avoid persecution
- Alphonse James de Rothschild (1827–1905), French financier, vineyard owner, art collector, philanthropist and racehorse owner and breeder

== Fictional characters ==
- a title character of Alphonse and Gaston, an American comic strip
- Monsieur Alfonse, in the BBC sitcom Allo 'Allo!
- the title character of Monsieur Alphonse, Alexandre Dumas fils' 1873 play
- Alphonse "Big Boy" Caprice, in the 1990 film Dick Tracy
- Alphonse Elric, in the anime/manga series Fullmetal Alchemist
- Alphonse Mephisto, in the animated television series South Park

== See also ==
- Alphonse (disambiguation)
- Alphonse (surname)
- Alphonse (surname)
- Alfonso (disambiguation)
