= Fernando Visier Segovia =

Spanish chess player (born 1943)

Personal information
- Born: 3 February 1943 (age 83) Madrid, Spain

Chess career
- Country: Spain
- Title: FIDE Master (1980)
- Peak rating: 2375 (January 1975)

Fernando Visier Segovia (born 3 February 1943, Madrid) is a Spanish chess player with the rank of FIDE Master. He won the Spanish Chess Championship twice.

== Biography ==
He studied at CEIP San Ildefonso, a school founded in Madrid in 1543. While there, he was one of the choirboys who sang the results of the 1957 Spanish Christmas Lottery.

He won the Spanish Chess Championship in 1968 and 1972. He represented Spain three times at Chess Olympiads: 1968 in Lugano, 1972 in Skopje, and 1974 in Nice. He represented Spain at the 1970 European Men's Team Chess Championship. He played for Spain at the Clare Benedict Chess Cup in 1967 (Leysin, Switzerland), 1968 (Bad Aibling, Germany), 1969 (Adelboden, Switzerland), 1970 (Paignton, England), 1972 (Vienna, Austria) and 1973 (Gstaad, Switzerland). In 2004, he was awarded a silver medal for services to sport in Castilla-La Mancha.

== Notable games and results ==
These include:

- 1968 – defeated Juan Betancort Curbelo in 31 moves
- 1968 – 5.5/17 at the tournament in Palma de Mallorca
- 1977 – defeated Mikhail Tal in 39 moves
