= Alfonso (disambiguation) =

Alfonso is a masculine given name. It may also refer to:

- Alfonso, Cavite, a municipality in the Philippines
- Alphonso (mango), a type of mango found in India
- a title character of Alfonso und Estrella, an opera by Franz Schubert
- Alphonso, a book by Stéphanie Félicité, comtesse de Genlis

== See also ==
- Afonso Cláudio, Espírito Santo, a municipality in Brazil
- Alfonso Castañeda, Nueva Vizcaya, a municipality in the Philippines
- Alfonso Lista, Ifugao, a municipality in the Philippines
- Alphonse (given name)
- Alphonse (surname)
- Saint-Alphonse (disambiguation)
- Ildefonso (disambiguation)
- San Ildefonso (disambiguation)
