= San Ildefonso (disambiguation) =

San Ildefonso or just Ildefonso, is a masculine name, originally from the Gothic language. It is taken from the name Hildefuns meaning "battle ready" (hild "battle" combined with funs "ready"). It is Latinised as Ildephonsus, and it is possible that Alfonso is a variant of this name.

It can refer to:

== Places ==
- Cape San Ildefonso, a cape in the Philippines
- San Ildefonso Amatlán, a municipality in Oaxaca, Mexico
- San Ildefonso Ixtahuacán, a municipality in Guatemala
- San Ildefonso Peninsula, a peninsula in the Philippines
- San Ildefonso Pueblo, New Mexico, a census-designated place in the USA
- San Ildefonso, Bulacan, a municipality in the Philippines
- San Ildefonso, Ilocos Sur, a municipality in the Philippines
- San Ildefonso, San Vicente, a municipality in El Salvador
- San Ildefonso, Coamo, Puerto Rico, a barrio
- San Ildefonso, a town in Spain
- San Ildefonso Solá, a municipality in Oaxaca, Mexico
- San Ildefonso Villa Alta, a municipality in Oaxaca, Mexico

== People ==
- Saint Ildephonsus of Toledo, archbishop of Toledo in the 7th century
- Blessed Ildefonso Schuster, archbishop of Milan, Italy

=== Treaty of San Ildefonso ===
- First Treaty of San Ildefonso of 1777 between Spain and Portugal this was settled in Uruguay a region in this time called orbe novo
- Second Treaty of San Ildefonso of 1796 between Spain and France, allying the two nations
- Third Treaty of San Ildefonso of 1800 between Spain and France, by which Spain returned Louisiana to France

== Other uses ==
- CEIP San Ildefonso, a bilingual school in Madrid
- San Ildefonso, a Spanish ship launched in 1785 and captured by the Royal Navy and renamed HMS Ildefonso in 1805
- Church of Saint Ildefonso, an 18th-century church in Oporto
- San Ildefonso school also known as the San Ildefonso Self-taught Group, a Native American art movement from 1900–1935

== See also ==
- Santo Ildefonso, a parish in Portugal
- Ildefonso (disambiguation)
