= Ann Street =

Ann Street may refer to:

- Ann Street, Belfast, Northern Ireland
- Ann Street, Boston, Massachusetts, US
- Ann Street, Brisbane, Australia
- Ann Street (now Ann Uccello Street), Hartford, Connecticut, United States; namesake of the Ann Street Historic District
- Ann Street (Manhattan), New York, US
- Anne Penfold Street, Australian mathematician

== See also ==
- Ann Street Barry, actress, maiden name Ann Street
