= Phonse =

Phonse is a masculine given name. Notable people with the name include:

- Phonse Carroll, New Zealand rugby union and rugby league footballer
- Phonse Kyne, Australian rules footballer
- Phonse Marshall, Australian rules footballer
- Phonse Orger, Australian rules footballer
- Phonse Wood, Australian rules footballer

== See also ==
- Alphonse (given name)
- Fonse
