= Alphonse (surname) =

The surname Alphonse or Alfonse may refer to:

- Alexandre Alphonse (born 1982), French-born Guadeloupean footballer
- Eloi Maxime Alphonse (born 1957), Malagasy diplomat and politician
- Gerard A. Alphonse, electrical engineer, physicist and research scientist
- Jean Alfonse (c. 1484–1544 or 1549), Portuguese navigator, explorer and corsair
- Jefferson Alphonse (born 2003), Canadian soccer player
- Jules Alfonse (1911–2000), American football player
- Kódjo Kassé Alphonse (born 1993), Ivorian footballer
- Lylah M. Alphonse (born 1972), American journalist
- Mickaël Alphonse (born 1989), French footballer
- Quesnel Alphonse (born 1949), Haitian Roman Catholic bishop
- S. Peter Alphonse, Indian politician

== See also ==
- Alphonse (given name)
- Alfonso (disambiguation)
