= Lionel Neykov =

French songwriter and singer (born 1979)

- Born: 1979
- Origin: Paris, France
- Genres: Singer-songwriter, Indie
- Occupation(s): Singer, songwriter
- Instrument(s): vocals, guitar
- Labels: Self Publishing on CD Baby and iTunes
- Website: myspace.com/LionelNeykov

Lionel Neykov is a French songwriter and singer.

He became very popular in Spain during Christmas 2008 after his song Freeze my senses was selected for the annual advertising campaign of the Spanish Christmas Lottery.

== Biography ==
Born to a French mother and a Bulgarian father in Paris, he started playing the guitar when he was 21 years old. He soon started to write and record his own songs. At the age of 24, he moved to New York, where he currently lives. In summer 2007 he started working on his first album; Songs of Want and Loss. After releasing his songs on YouTube and MySpace, his song Freeze my senses was selected by the Advertising agency "Ricardo Pérez Asociados" for the television advertisement they were preparing for the Spanish Christmas Lottery campaign for 2008. When "Ricardo Pérez Asociados" was selected by the Spanish Lottery to produce the commercials, he was contacted again and got a US$20,000 deal for the use of his song on the advertisement, twice what he was offered initially.
