= Ildefons =

Ildefons is a masculine given name which is borne by:

- Ildefons Cerdà (1815–1876), Spanish urban planner
- Ildefons Lima (born 1979), Andorran footballer

== See also ==
- Ildefonso (disambiguation)
- Ildefonsus
