= Connecticut's 5th House of Representatives district =

American legislative district

Connecticut's 5th State House of Representatives district
Representative
Maryam Khan; D

Connecticut's 5th House of Representatives district elects one member of the Connecticut House of Representatives. The district consists of the northeastern part of the city of Hartford, including the Blue Hills and Clay Arsenal neighborhoods, as well as Downtown Hartford. The district is one of the few in Connecticut with a Black majority population. Owing to this fact, it is one of the safest House districts in Connecticut for Democrats.

It has been represented by Maryam Khan since March 1, 2022.

== List of representatives ==
List of Representatives from Connecticut's 5th House District
Representative	Party	Years	District home	Note
Marie D. Dworak	Democratic	1967–1969	Hartford	Seat created
Richard J. Yedziniak	Democratic	1969–1973	Hartford	
Robert J. Carragher	Democratic	1973–1983	Hartford	
Anthony J. Palermino	Democratic	1983–1991	Hartford	
Alphonse S. Marotta	Democratic	1991–1993	Hartford	
Marie Lopez Kirkley-Bey	Democratic	1993–2013	Hartford	
Brandon McGee	Democratic	2013–2022	Hartford	Stepped down to work on Ned Lamont's gubernatorial re-election campaign
Maryam Khan	Democratic	2022–	Windsor	Elected in special election

== Recent elections ==
State Election 2018: House District 5
Party	Candidate	Votes	%	±%
Democratic	Brandon McGee	6,474	85.0	
Republican	Charles Jackson	1,144	15.0	
Majority		7,618	70	
Democratic hold		Swing		

Democratic Primary, August 14, 2018: House District 5
Party	Candidate	Votes	%	±%
Democratic	Brandon McGee	1,704	74.1	
Democratic	Lawrence Jaggon	597	25.9	
Majority		1,107	48.2	
Turnout		2,301		

State Election 2008: House District 5
Party	Candidate	Votes	%	±%
Democratic	Marie Lopez Kirkley-Bey	4,147	82.1	−14.1
Independent	Larry Charles	821	16.2	+16.2
Independent	Craig T. Stallings	87	1.7	+1.7
Majority		3,326	65.8	−26.6
Turnout		5,055		
Democratic hold		Swing	-15.2	

Democratic Primary, August 12, 2008: House District 5
Party	Candidate	Votes	%	±%
Democratic	Marie Lopez Kirkley-Bey	661	66.6	
Democratic	Abraham Giles	332	33.4	
Majority		329	33.1	
Turnout		993		

State Election 2006: House District 5
Party	Candidate	Votes	%	±%
Democratic	Marie Lopez Kirkley-Bey	1,954	96.2	−1.2
Libertarian	Richard Lion	77	3.8	+1.2
Majority		1,877	92.4	−2.4
Turnout		2,031		
Democratic hold		Swing	-1.2	

State Election 2004: House District 5
Party	Candidate	Votes	%	±%
Democratic	Marie Lopez Kirkley-Bey	3,570	97.4	+6.4
Libertarian	Richard Lion	95	2.6	+2.6
Majority		3,475	94.8	+12.7
Turnout		3,665		
Democratic hold		Swing	+4.5	

Democratic Primary, August 10, 2004: House District 5
Party	Candidate	Votes	%	±%
Democratic	Marie Lopez Kirkley-Bey	632	59.4	
Democratic	Paul M. Ritter	432	30.6	
Majority		200	18.8	
Turnout		1,064		

State Election 2002: House District 5
Party	Candidate	Votes	%	±%
Democratic	Marie Lopez Kirkley-Bey	2,060	91.0	−9.0
Republican	Mark A. Sidell	203	9.0	+9.0
Majority		1,857	82.1	−17.9
Turnout		2,263		
Democratic hold		Swing	-9.0	

State Election 2000: House District 5
Party	Candidate	Votes	%	±%
Democratic	Marie Lopez Kirkley-Bey	2,159	100.0	0.0
Majority		2,159	100.0	0.0
Turnout		2,159		
Democratic hold		Swing	0.0	

State Election 1998: House District 5
Party	Candidate	Votes	%	±%
Democratic	Marie Lopez Kirkley-Bey	1,485	100.0	
Majority		1,485	100.0	
Turnout		1,485		
Democratic hold		Swing		
