= Fonse =

Fonse is a masculine given name. Notable people with the name include:

- Fonse Carroll, New Zealand rugby union and rugby league footballer
- Fonse Faour, Canadian politician

== See also ==
- Alphonse (given name)
- Phonse
