= Rabbe =

Rabbe can refer to:

- Alphonse Rabbe, a French writer
- Rabbe Arnfinn Enckell, a Finnish writer
- Wilhelm Raabe, a German novelist
