= Ildefonso (given name) =

Ildefonso (Ildefonsus) is a Spanish given name, ultimately from Gothic Hildefuns, the name of 7th-century saint and archbishop Ildephonsus.

Other people with the given name include:

- Ildefonso Falcones (born 1959), Spanish author and lawyer
- Ildefonso Puigdendolas ((1876–1936), Spanish military officer
- Ildefonso Santos (1897–1984), Filipino educator and poet
- Ildefonso P. Santos Jr. (1929–2014), Filipino architect, son of the above

== See also ==
- Alfonso, another name
- Alfonso (disambiguation)
