= Camille Alphonse =

Camille Alphonse is a given name. Notable people with the name include:

- Camille Alphonse Faure (1840–1898), French chemical engineer
- Camille Alphonse Trézel (1780–1860), French général de division, Minister for War and peer of France during the July Monarchy

== See also ==
- Alphonse (disambiguation)
