= Alphonse James =

Alphonse James is a given name. Notable people with the name include:

- Alphonse James de Rothschild (1827–1905), French financier, vineyard owner, art collector, philanthropist and racehorse owner and breeder
- Alphonse James Schladweiler (1902–1996), American prelate of the Roman Catholic Church

== See also ==
- Alphonse (disambiguation)
