= Hartford Electric Light Company Maple Avenue Sub-Station =

- U.S. National Register of Historic Places
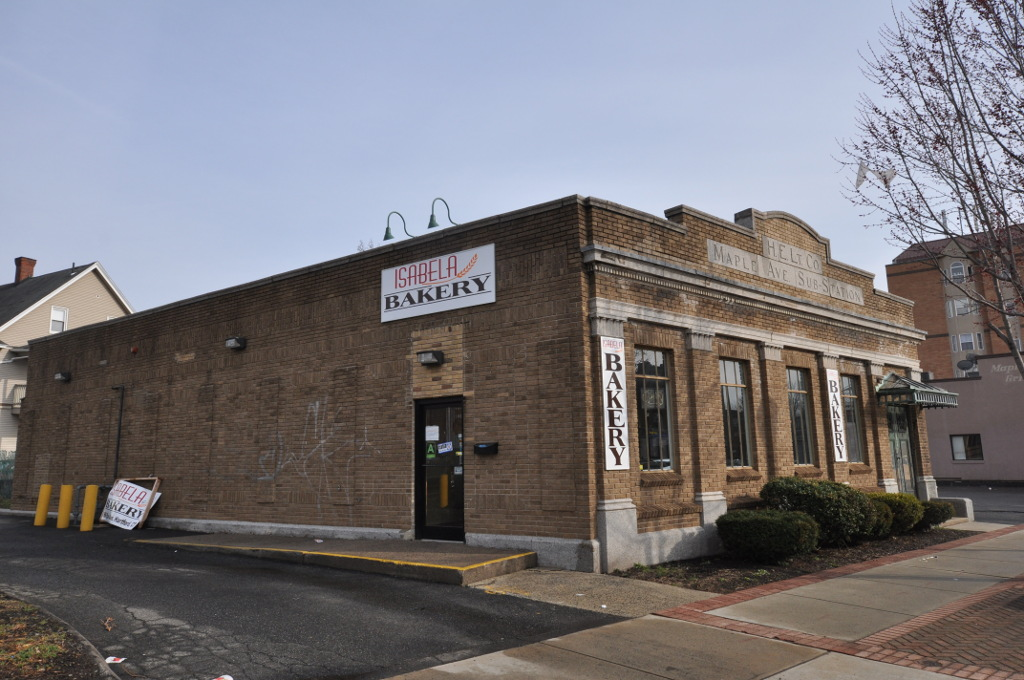

- Location within Connecticut Location within the United States
- Location: 686 Maple Avenue, Hartford, Connecticut
- Coordinates: 41°44′30″N 72°41′0″W
- Area: 0.2 acres (0.081 ha)
- Built: 1926
- Architect: Whiton and McMahon
- Architectural style: Classical Revival
- NRHP reference No.: 00000833
- Added to NRHP: August 11, 2000

The Hartford Electric Light Company Maple Avenue Sub-Station is a historic industrial and commercial building at 686 Maple Avenue in Hartford, Connecticut. Built in 1926, it is a fine example of Classical Revival architecture designed by noted local architects, and a reminder of the history of the area's electrification. It was listed on the National Register of Historic Places in 2000, and has been converted into commercial use.

== Description and history ==
The former Maple Avenue substation of the Hartford Electric Light Company stands in southern Hartford's Barry Square area, on the east side of Maple Avenue between Adelaide and Barker Streets. It is a single-story brick building, shaped in a rough parallelogram to accommodate Maple Avenue's diagonal traversal of the city street grid. Its walls are buff brick laid in common bond, and it has a five-bay front facade, articulated by projecting brick pilasters with papyrus-leaf capitals. A double-leaf door in the southernmost bay provides entry to the building, sheltered by a metal hip-roofed hood. The front facade is crowned by a stepped parapet, in which the building's original name and function are incised.

The Hartford Electric Light Company (HELCO, later merged into Connecticut Light & Power and now part of Eversource Energy) was founded in 1881, primarily to serve large industrial customers. Its service expanded, and this distribution substation was built in 1926 as part of a push to expand service more broadly into southern Hartford. The station was designed by Frank Whiton and John McMahon, Hartford-based architects. The pair designed an eclectic example of Classical Revival architecture for an otherwise utilitarian structure.

== See also ==
- National Register of Historic Places listings in Hartford, Connecticut
