= Ann Street Historic District =

Historic district in Connecticut, United States

- U.S. National Register of Historic Places
- U.S. Historic district
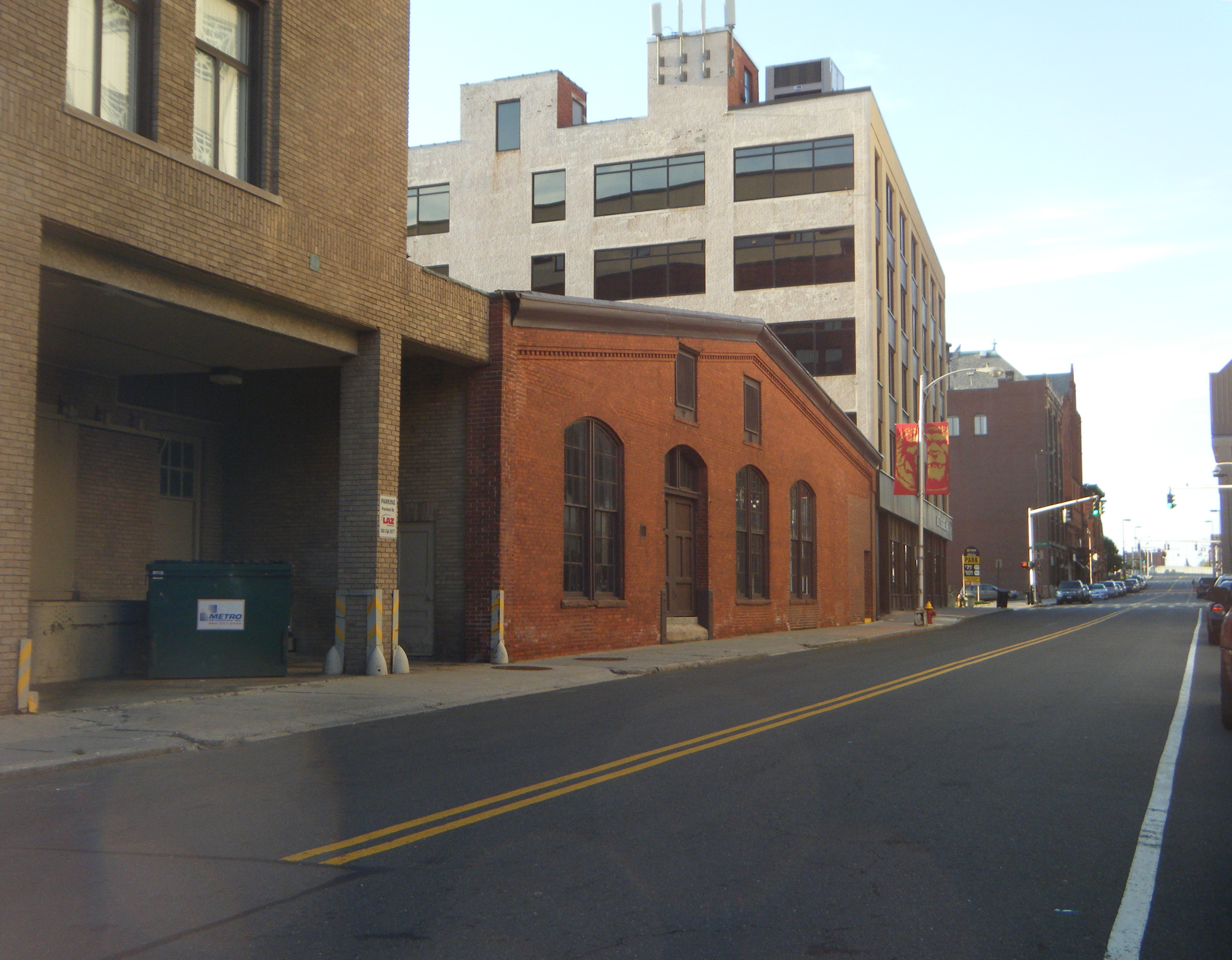
- Hartford Steam Plant, Ann Street facade (rear of 266 Pearl), in 2010

- Location within Connecticut Location within the United States
- Location: Allyn, Ann, Asylum, Church, Hicks and Pearl Streets, Hartford, Connecticut
- Coordinates: 41°46′3″N 72°40′42″W
- Area: 9 acres (3.6 ha)
- Architectural style: Romanesque, Gothic Revival, Renaissance Revival
- NRHP reference No.: 83003514
- Added to NRHP: November 28, 1983

The Ann Street Historic District is a historic district encompassing part of Downtown Hartford in Hartford, Connecticut. A commercial and light industrial area, the district includes properties along Ann Uccello Street (formerly called Ann Street) from Chapel Street south to Hicks Street. It also includes properties east of Ann Street fronting Pearl Street and Hicks Street to roughly Haynes Street, as well as properties west of Ann Uccello Street fronting Allyn and Asylum Streets to roughly a third of the block. The district's architecture typifies the city's development between about 1880 and 1930; it was listed on the National Register of Historic Places in 1983.

== Description ==
Within the district are the former Sport and Medical Science Academy building (a non-contributing property), and the Central Fire Station of the Hartford Fire Department. The district includes location of the Hartford Steam Company generating plant. Other contributing properties in the district include St. Patrick - St. Anthony Roman Catholic Church (built in 1849), the Masonic Temple (built in 1894) and the Hotel Lenox (also known as Hartford Hotel), a Beaux-Arts eclectic style building at 280-294 Ann Street, built in 1899. One unusual inclusion is Metropolitan Garage on Hicks Street; built in 1930, it is an early example of a multi-level parking garage. Another property that shows evidence of the rise of the automobile in importance is 316-320 Ann Uccello Street, which was built for a maker of electrical equipment for automobiles.

In 2008, Ann Street was renamed "Ann Uccello Street" in honor of Ann Uccello, Hartford's first female mayor.

== See also ==
- National Register of Historic Places listings in Hartford, Connecticut
- Hartford Electric Light Company
- Mary-Ann (turbine generator)
