= Saint-Alphonse =

Saint-Alphonse may refer to:

- Saint-Alphonse, Quebec
- Saint Alphonse, Manitoba
- Saint-Alphonse-de-Granby, Quebec
- Saint-Alphonse-Rodriguez, Quebec

== See also ==
- Alphonse (disambiguation)
