= Loterías y Apuestas del Estado =

Spanish national lottery

Sociedad Estatal Loterías y Apuestas del Estado, S.A.
- Type: Sociedad Anónima
- Industry: Lottery
- Predecessor: Organización Nacional de Loterías y Apuestas del Estado; Entidad Pública Loterías y Apuestas del Estado (1999-2010)
- Founded: Madrid, Spain (September 30, 1763; 262 years ago)
- Founder: King Charles III
- Headquarters: Madrid, Spain
- Number of locations: 11,028 retailers
- Area served: Spain and Andorra
- Key people: Jesús Huerta Almendro (Chairman and CEO)
- Revenue: ▲€10.59 billion (2025)
- Operating income: ▼€2.86 billion (2025)
- Net income: ▼€2.18 billion (2025)
- Total assets: ▼€23.46 billion (2025)
- Total equity: ▼€20.87 billion (2025)
- Owner: Government of Spain
- Number of employees: 478 direct and more than 11,043 indirect (2025)
- Parent: Heritage Group
- Subsidiaries: Services Aux Loteries en Europe (30,53 %)
- Website: www.loteriasyapuestas.es

Sociedad Estatal Loterías y Apuestas del Estado (Spanish for "State Society for State Lotteries and Wagers"; SELAE) is a Spanish state-owned company reporting to the Spanish Ministry of Finance. It is responsible for the management, operation and marketing of all types of lotteries and gambling nationwide or whenever they exceed the scope of a region, being famous for its Christmas Lottery. Some public interest entities, such as ONCE or the Red Cross, have authorization to carry out independent lottery draws.

As a public company, it was created in 1984 due to the integration of the services that until then managed the State games —the Mutual Sports Betting Board and the National Lottery Service— and it was last reformed in 2010. It assumes all State powers on lotteries, an activity promoted by the State since 1763, when King Charles III created the Royal Lottery. Since 1812, it also manages the Christmas Lottery, the biggest lottery draw worldwide.

== Lotteries ==
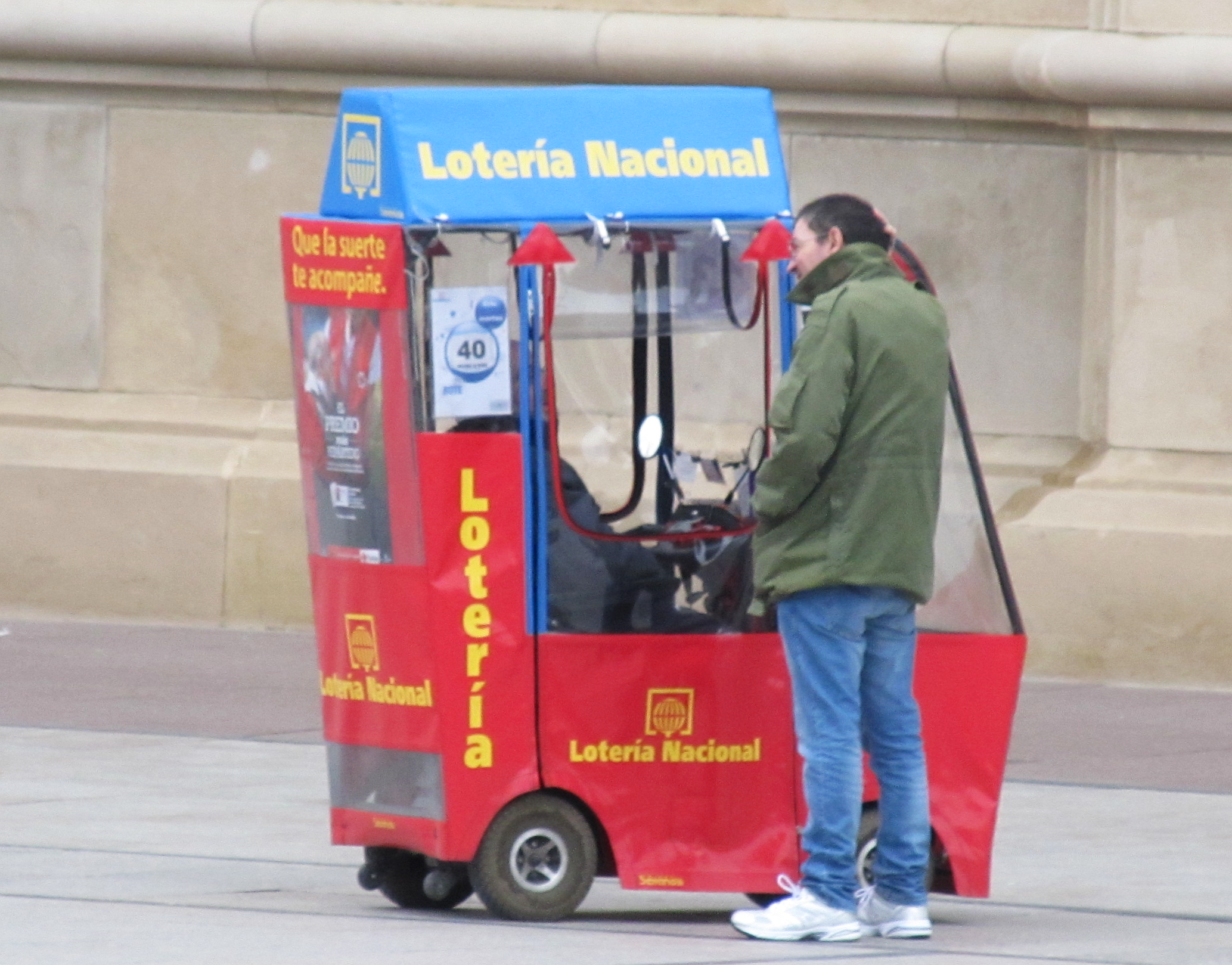
Lotería Nacional: ticket selling in Zaragoza.

- Lotería Nacional
  - Spanish Christmas Lottery
  - Sorteo Extraordinario de El Niño
- Lotería Primitiva
- EuroMillones
  - El Millón
- BonoLoto
- El Gordo de la Primitiva
- La Quiniela
- El Quinigol
- Lototurf
- Quíntuple Plus

== See also ==
- Ministry of Economy and Finance
- ONCE
