= Sola de Vega District =

- District
- Oaxaca regions and districts: Sierra Sur in Southwest
- Coordinates: 16°30′45″N 96°58′50″W
- Country: Mexico
- State: Oaxaca

Area
  - Land: 3,559 km^{2} (1,374 sq mi)

Population (2020)
  - Total: 86,746

Sola de Vega District is located in the Sierra Sur Region of the State of Oaxaca, Mexico. The district center is Villa Sola de Vega.

== Municipalities ==
The district includes the following municipalities:

Municipality code	Name	Population		Land Area			Population density	
Municipality code	Name	2020	Rank	km^{2}	sq mi	Rank	2020	Rank
137	San Francisco Cahuacúa	3,450	7	280.3	108.2	3	12/km^{2} (32/sq mi)	15
149	San Francisco Sola	2,019	12	107	41	12	19/km^{2} (49/sq mi)	11
155	San Ildefonso Sola	1,060	16	38.72	14.95	16	27/km^{2} (71/sq mi)	7
158	San Jacinto Tlacotepec	2,233	11	63.59	24.55	13	35/km^{2} (91/sq mi)	4
229	San Lorenzo Texmelucan	9,148	4	137.4	53.1	10	67/km^{2} (172/sq mi)	2
566	San Mateo Yucutindoo	3,144	9	197.8	76.4	8	16/km^{2} (41/sq mi)	13
535	San Vicente Lachixío	3,227	8	136.4	52.7	11	24/km^{2} (61/sq mi)	8
386	Santa Cruz Zenzontepec	19,079	1	483.8	186.8	2	39/km^{2} (102/sq mi)	3
420	Santa María Lachixío	1,679	13	49.64	19.17	15	34/km^{2} (88/sq mi)	5
429	Santa María Sola	1,516	14	52.04	20.09	14	29/km^{2} (75/sq mi)	6
448	Santa María Zaniza	2,469	10	157.5	60.8	9	16/km^{2} (41/sq mi)	12
450	Santiago Amoltepec	13,855	2	207.3	80.0	6	67/km^{2} (173/sq mi)	1
477	Santiago Minas	1,327	15	198.2	76.5	7	7/km^{2} (17/sq mi)	16
491	Santiago Textitlán	4,930	6	251.9	97.3	4	20/km^{2} (51/sq mi)	10
516	Santo Domingo Teojomulco	5,260	5	224.5	86.7	5	23/km^{2} (61/sq mi)	9
277	Villa Sola de Vega	12,350	2	973	376	1	13/km^{2} (33/sq mi)	14
	Distrito Choapam	86,746	—	3,559	1,374.14	—	24/km^{2} (63/sq mi)	—
Source: INEGI
