= Marie D. Dworak =

American politician (1919–2006)

Member of the Connecticut House of Representatives from the 5th district
- In office 1967–1969
- Preceded by: Seat created
- Succeeded by: Richard J. Yedziniak

Personal details
- Born: Marie Dziedzak; December 25, 1919 Shenandoah, Pennsylvania, U.S.
- Died: July 4, 2006 (aged 86)
- Party: Democratic
- Spouse: Joe Dworak
- Children: 2

Marie D. Dworak (December 25, 1919 – July 4, 2006) was an American politician who served in the Connecticut House of Representatives from 1967 to 1969, representing the 5th district as a Democrat.
