= El Gordo de la Primitiva =

Official game of chance of Spain

El Gordo de la Primitiva (literally the fat one of the primitive lottery, sometimes translated as the big one), commonly known simply as El Gordo, is one of the lotteries operated by Loterías y Apuestas del Estado, the Spanish government lottery authority.

The term 'El Gordo' is also used to refer to the largest prize awarded in the Spanish Christmas Lottery and to a lesser extent in other Spanish lotteries.

== How it is played ==
Tickets consist of two grids: one with numbers from 1 to 54 and a second with numbers from 0 to 9. Players must pick five numbers from the first grid and one from the second (the key number). The key number also determines whether the ticket receives a refund.

Tickets can be bought from Monday to Saturday in over eleven thousand locations in Spain and cost €1.50 per grid.

By selecting six to eleven numbers in the first grid, players can make multiple bets (from 6 to 462) with the same ticket.

== Drawing ==
Draws are held every Sunday at 13:00 (GMT+1).

Five numbers are drawn at random from 1–54, followed by one number for the key number from 0–9. Prizes are awarded to tickets whose numbers match the drawn ones. First prize is for a perfect match (5+1), second for 5+0, third for 4+1, and so on down to 2+0, totaling eight prize categories. Tickets whose key number matches the drawn key number only are entitled to a refund of the amount played.

A ticket can hold more than one bet, but each bet cannot win more than one prize.

== Prizes ==
From the total amount collected T, the state keeps 45%. Ten percent is reserved for returns (refunds), and 45% is distributed as prizes (22% for the first category and 23% for the remaining categories).

For all categories, the prize is shared in equal parts among all matching tickets.

The first category has a guaranteed minimum amount of five million euros. If there are no first‑category winners, 50% of the amount reserved for that category (11% of T) is added to the guaranteed (or previous) amount for the next draw, often resulting in very large bonus prizes (only for the first category).

The amount for the remaining prizes (23% of T) is then reduced by the number of tickets with 2+0 prizes (eighth category), each of which receives a fixed amount of 3 €. The resulting amount R is then distributed as follows:

- 33% of R for second category (5+0)
- 6% of R for third category (4+1)
- 7% of R for fourth category (4+0)
- 8% of R for fifth category (3+1)
- 26% of R for sixth category (3+0)
- 20% of R for seventh category (2+1)

Special rules apply if any of these categories has no winners, and also if any category would otherwise receive a lower prize than a lower category.
