= Marie Lopez Kirkley-Bey =

American politician (1941–2025)

Member of the Connecticut House of Representatives from the 5th district
- In office 1993–2013
- Preceded by: Alphonse S. Marotta
- Succeeded by: Brandon McGee

Personal details
- Born: September 18, 1941 New Britain, Connecticut, U.S.
- Died: May 17, 2025 (aged 83)
- Party: Democratic

Marie Lopez Kirkley-Bey (September 18, 1941 – May 17, 2025) was an American politician who served in the Connecticut House of Representatives from 1993 to 2013, representing the 5th district.

Kirkley-Bey was the first woman of color to be appointed deputy speaker of the Connecticut House of Representatives. In 2023, her grandson, Connor Martin, became the first person of color to serve as mayor of East Hartford, Connecticut.
