= Alphonse Barancira =

Burundian politician

Alphonse Barancira is a former minister for Human Rights, Constitutional Reform and Relations with the National Assembly of Burundi. He belongs to the ANADDE party. He was appointed to the post in 2001. He is a Tutsi.
