= San Lorenzo Texmelucan =

- Municipality and town
- Location in Mexico
- Coordinates: 16°35′N 97°12′W
- Country: Mexico
- State: Oaxaca

Area
  - Total: 303.65 km^{2} (117.24 sq mi)

Population (2005)
  - Total: 6,319
- Time zone: UTC-6 (Central Standard Time)

San Lorenzo Texmelucan is a town and municipality in Oaxaca in south-western Mexico. The municipality covers an area of 303.65 km^{2}. It is part of the Sola de Vega District in the Sierra Sur Region.

As of 2005, the municipality had a total population of 6,319.
