= Santo Domingo Teojomulco =

Coordinates: 16°36′N 97°14′W

- Municipality and town
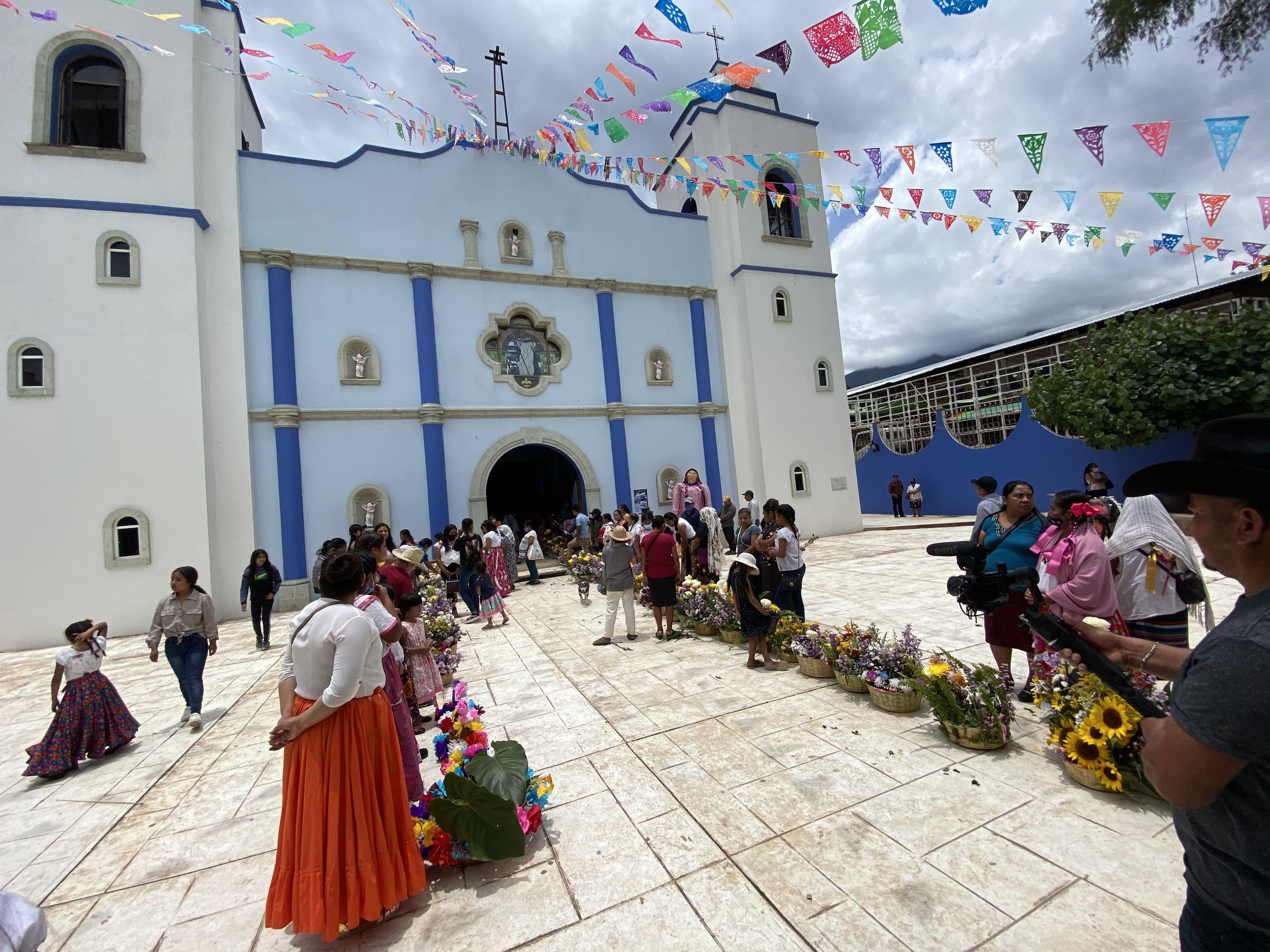
- Traditional celebration in Santo Domingo Teojomulco

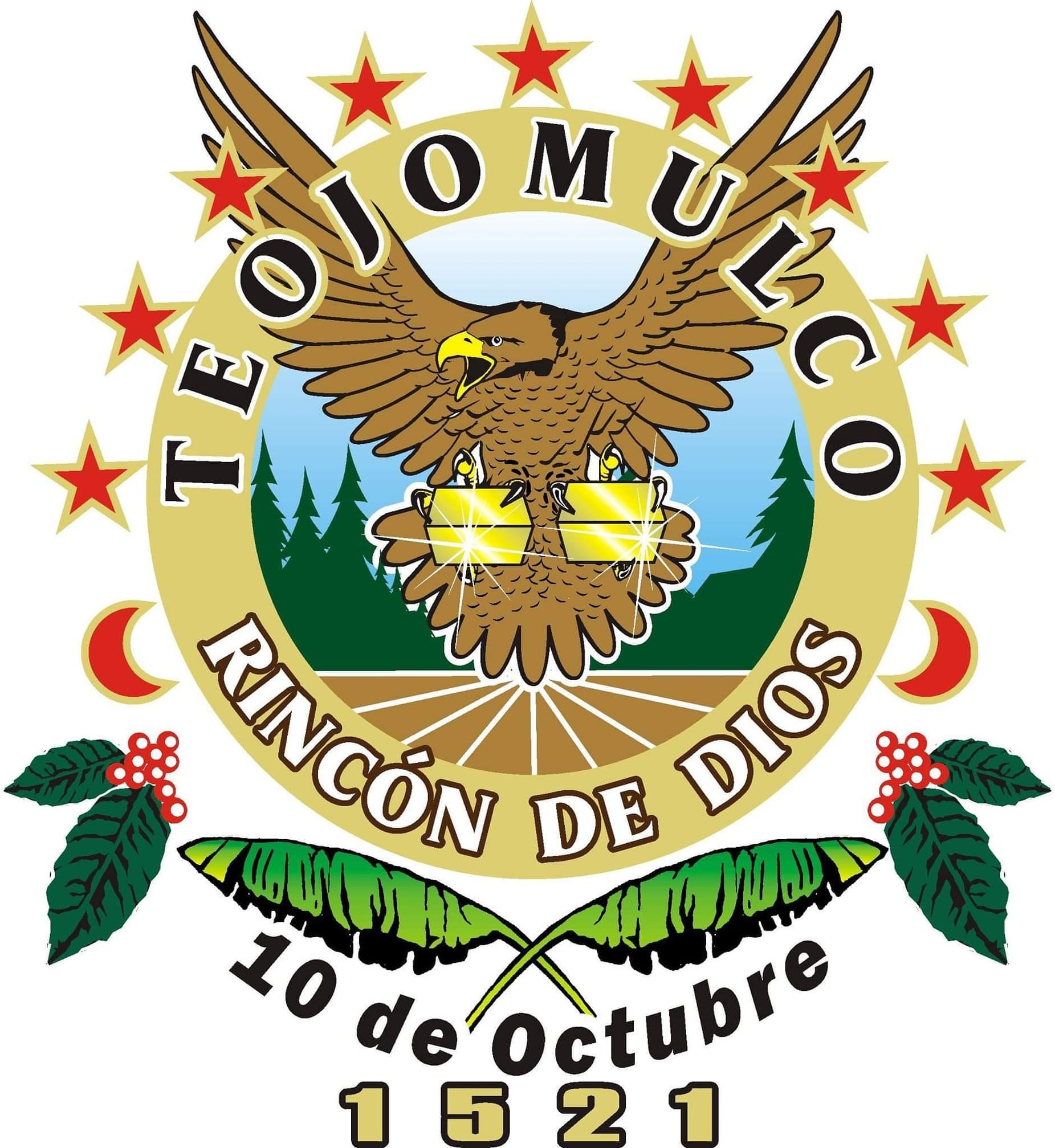
- Coat of arms
- Interactive map of Santo Domingo Teojomulco
- Country: Mexico
- State: Oaxaca

Population (2020)
  - Total: 5,260
- Time zone: UTC-6 (Central Standard Time)

Santo Domingo Teojomulco is a town and municipality in Oaxaca in south-western Mexico. The municipality covers an area of km^{2}. It is part of the Sola de Vega District in the Sierra Sur Region.

As of 2020, the municipality had a total population of 5,260 and the town had a population of 2,463.
