= San Francisco Cahuacúa =

- Municipality and town
- Location in Mexico
- Coordinates: 16°54′N 97°18′W
- Country: Mexico
- State: Oaxaca

Area
  - Total: 169.7 km^{2} (65.5 sq mi)

Population (2005)
  - Total: 3,170
- Time zone: UTC-6 (Central Standard Time)

San Francisco Cahuacua is a town and municipality in Oaxaca in south-western Mexico. The municipality covers an area of 169.7 km^{2}. It is part of the Sola de Vega District in the Sierra Sur Region.

As of 2005, the municipality had a total population of 3,170.
