= BonoLoto =

BonoLoto is a lottery in Spain, regulated by the Sociedad Estatal Loterías y Apuestas del Estado.

The first draw of BonoLoto was held on 28 February 1988. The aim of the game was to provide frequent draws at affordable prices. Reintegro (Reimbursement) was introduced to the game in 1991.

== Play ==
BonoLoto draws are on Monday to Sunday at 21:30 (+02:00 UTC) in the official lottery draw studios of the Spanish national lottery operator, Loterías y Apuestas del Estado.

Players have to match 6 numbers from 1-49. During the draw, a 7th, additional number is pulled, the so-called Complementario (complementary), which is used to create the 5+1 winning category. BonoLoto has a so-called Reintegro feature (refund). Reintegro is randomly assigned to the ticket upon purchase, and if the ticket matches the pulled Reintegro, the player is eligible for a refund of the ticket price. A single line of BonoLoto costs €0.50, and the minimum to play is €1.00, which can be achieved by playing 2 lines for the same draw, or by playing a single line for 2 draws.

== Winnings ==
In BonoLoto 55% of the income is allocated to prizes. Jackpot starts at €400,000 and rolls over each time that the jackpot is not won. Prizes are paid in a single cash payment. The largest BonoLoto jackpot of €10,614,853.61 was won on January 17, 2024 by a single winner. Winnings over €40,000 are subject to a 20% government tax from 1 January 2013.

== Odds ==
Division	Winning Numbers Required	Probability (Single Game)
1st Prize	6	1 in 13,983,816
2nd Division	5 + Complementary	1 in 2,330,636
3rd Division	5	1 in 54,201
4th Division	4	1 in 11,907
5th Division	3	1 in 327
