= Clay Hill Historic District =

Historic district in Connecticut, United States

- U.S. National Register of Historic Places
- U.S. Historic district
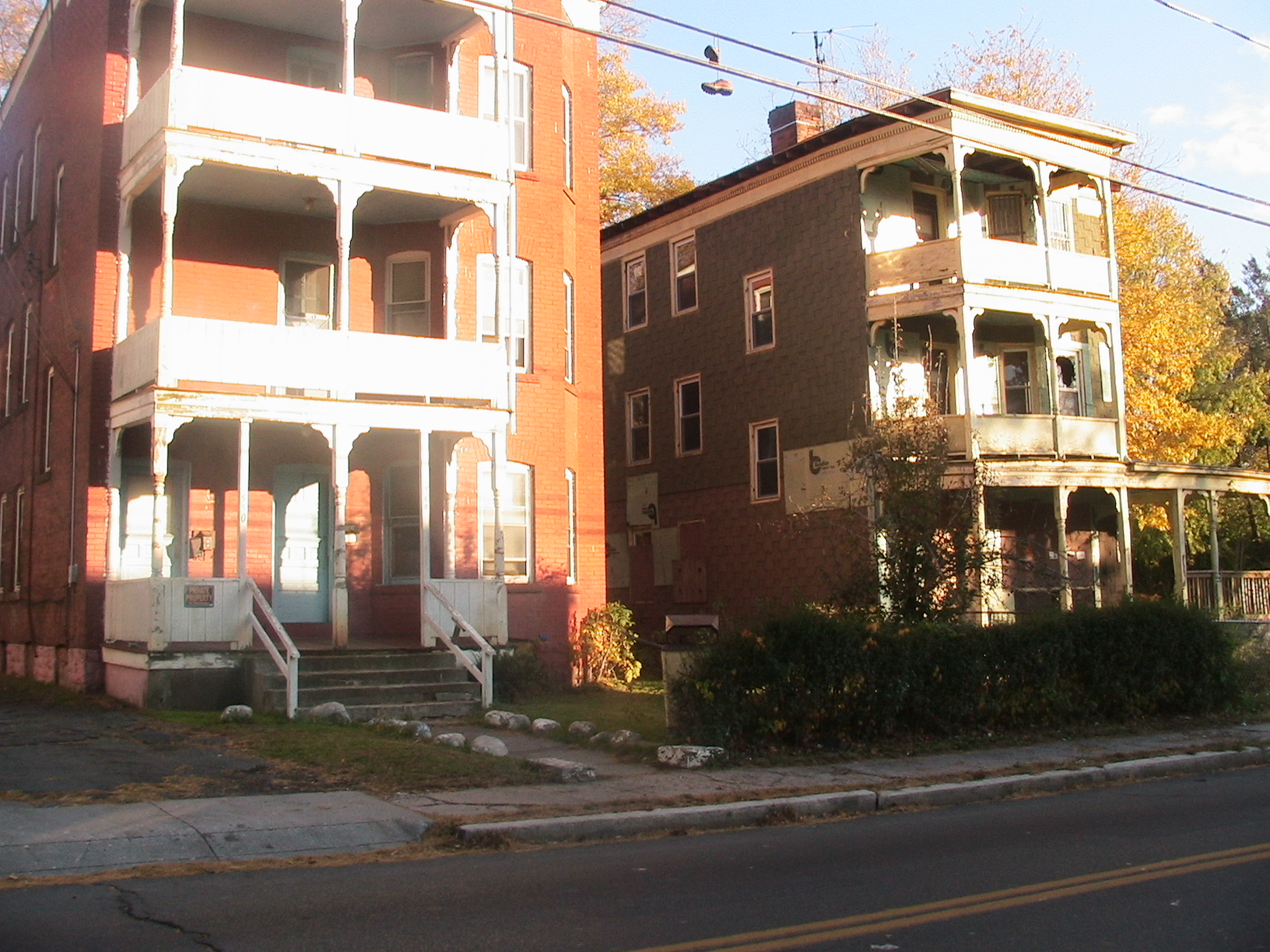
- Clay Hill/Arsenal neighborhood

- Location within Connecticut Location within the United States
- Location: Roughly bounded by Main, Mather, Garden, and Walnut Streets, Hartford, Connecticut
- Coordinates: 41°45′44″N 72°40′48″W
- Area: 60 acres (24 ha)
- Architect: Multiple
- Architectural style: Queen Anne, Italianiate, Other
- NRHP reference No.: 83001258 (original); 84000833 (increase)

Significant dates
- Added to NRHP: 16 June 1983
- Boundary increase: 16 February 1984

The Clay Hill Historic District in Hartford, Connecticut is a 60-acre (24 ha) historic district that was listed on the National Register of Historic Places in 1983, and expanded in 1984. Northwest of Downtown Hartford, the district is roughly bounded by Main, Mather, Garden, and Walnut Streets. The district contains examples of Queen Anne, Italianiate and Neoclassical Revival architecture.

== History ==
Clay Arsenal is one of Hartford's oldest neighborhoods, developed in the middle and late 19th century. It was mainly farmland prior to 1847, when the Hartford-Springfield Railroad, which now forms the neighborhood's eastern border, was constructed. At one time, Windsor and Main streets intersected just north of Downtown. When the streets were reconfigured, several buildings and a public green were lost.

The section west of Main Street lies on a gentle rise above Downtown and is known as Clay Hill, so named for the type of soil there. The area east of Main Street has been known since 1812 as the Arsenal District, when a State Arsenal was constructed on the corner of North Main and Pavilion streets. The arsenal was demolished in 1909. The mid-19th century development of the Clay Hill area from rural to urban conditions was caused by the strong industrial growth of the city. As the city's factories rapidly grew more successful, the community at large was forced to keep up. The changes took the form of converting the farm land of long-time residents to city streets for new home owners.

Multi-family dwellings were the dominant development in the late 19th century as the neighborhood became home to Irish and Jewish working-class families. The Irish had been emigrating to Hartford through a recruitment effort for work on the Enfield Canal in Windsor Locks. In 1895, Clay Hill was predominantly Irish and was served by Saint Patrick's church in downtown Hartford. At about the same time, large numbers of Jews began arriving from Eastern Europe due to the anti-Semitic sentiment there. The new emigrants established themselves in the Arsenal district as grocers, tailors, butchers and jewelers along Main Street and Albany Avenue.

During the 20th century mobility continued. By the third quarter of the 20th century the residents of Clay Hill were almost exclusively black and Hispanic.

== See also ==
- Neighborhoods of Hartford, Connecticut
- National Register of Historic Places listings in Hartford, Connecticut
