= San Vicente Lachixío =

Coordinates: 16°42′N 97°01′W

- Municipality and town
- Interactive map of San Vicente Lachixío
- Country: Mexico
- State: Oaxaca

Population (2020)
  - Total: 3,227
- Time zone: UTC-6 (Central Standard Time)

San Vicente Lachixío is a town and municipality in Oaxaca in south-western Mexico. The municipality covers an area of 93.13 km^{2}. It is part of the Sola de Vega District in the Sierra Sur Region.

The town is named for the catholic patron saint San Vicente Ferrer. The town of San Vicente Lachixio was founded in 1776.

As of 2005, the municipality had a total population of 3,154 and in 2010 it was 2976 of which the great majority is from indigenous descent.
