= Maryam Khan =

Connecticut politician (born 1988)

Member of the Connecticut House of Representatives from the 5th district
- Incumbent
- Assumed office 2022
- Preceded by: Brandon McGee

Personal details
- Born: 1988 (age 37–38) Pakistan
- Party: Democratic
- Profession: Teacher

Maryam Khan (born 1988) is a Pakistan-born American politician who has been a member of the Connecticut House of Representatives since winning a special election to the 5th House District of Windsor and Hartford in 2022. She is the first Muslim elected to the Connecticut House of Representatives and the second elected to the Connecticut General Assembly after State Senator Saud Anwar.

== Background ==
Khan immigrated to the United States from Pakistan as a child in 1994. Khan was a special educational needs teacher before entering politics.

== Political career ==
Khan won nearly 75% of the votes the special-election in the 5th district to succeed Brandon McGee in 2022.

== Personal life ==
Khan lives in Windsor, Connecticut, with her three children.

=== Attack ===
On June 28, 2023, Khan was assaulted while taking pictures with her family, including her three children, outside the XL Center arena. The assault happened after a morning prayer service hosted by the Islamic Center of Connecticut. The attacker, Andrey Desmond, approached and made numerous suggestive and threatening comments towards Khan. When she tried to walk away, Desmond put his arm around her neck, tried to kiss her, slapped her across the face and threw her to the ground. Desmond later pleaded guilty to attempted third-degree sexual assault, strangulation and risk of injury to a child.

=== Dismissal of civil lawsuit ===
In September 2025, a federal judge dismissed a civil rights lawsuit filed by Khan against the City of Hartford and the Hartford Police Department over their response to her assault outside the XL Center in June 2023, finding that her amended complaint did not plausibly allege constitutional or statutory violations and citing evidence that did not support her claims of police misconduct.

The decision referenced police reports and body-worn camera footage showing officers responding to the scene and interacting with Khan and others, contrary to her assertions of an inadequate response.

Hartford Police Union President James Rutkauski said he had reviewed dispatch records, reports, and body-camera recordings and concluded that officers "responded to a chaotic scene, were sensitive to her needs, applied care, and treated her with respect," and stated that Khan owed "an apology" to the officers involved.

== Electoral history ==
2022 special election: District 5
Candidate	Party	Votes	%
Maryam Khan	Democratic	706	74.6
Charles Jackson	Republican	136	14.4
Lawrence Jaggon	Independent	104	11.0
Turnout		851	8.7

== See also ==
- List of foreign-born United States politicians
