= San Ildefonso Sola =

- Municipality and town
- Location in Mexico
- Coordinates: 16°31′N 96°59′W
- Country: Mexico
- State: Oaxaca

Area
  - Total: 52.32 km^{2} (20.20 sq mi)

Population (2005)
  - Total: 789
- Time zone: UTC-6 (Central Standard Time)

San Ildefonso Sola is a town and municipality in Oaxaca in south-western Mexico. The municipality covers an area of 52.32 km^{2}. It is part of the Sola de Vega District in the Sierra Sur Region.

As of 2005, the municipality had a total population of 789.
