= Phonse Orger =

Australian rules footballer, born 1915

Personal information
- Full name: Alphonsus James Orger
- Born: 21 January 1915; South Yarra, Victoria
- Died: 11 June 2002 (aged 87); Mount Waverley, Victoria
- Original team: West St Kilda CYMS (CYMSFA)
- Height: 178 cm (5 ft 10 in)
- Weight: 74 kg (163 lb)

Playing career^{1}
Years	Club	Games (Goals)
1942–44	St Kilda	15 (0)
- ^{1} Playing statistics correct to the end of 1944.

Alphonsus James Orger (21 January 1915 – 11 June 2002) was an Australian rules footballer who played with St Kilda in the Victorian Football League (VFL).
