= Alphonse S. Marotta =

American politician (1934–2024)

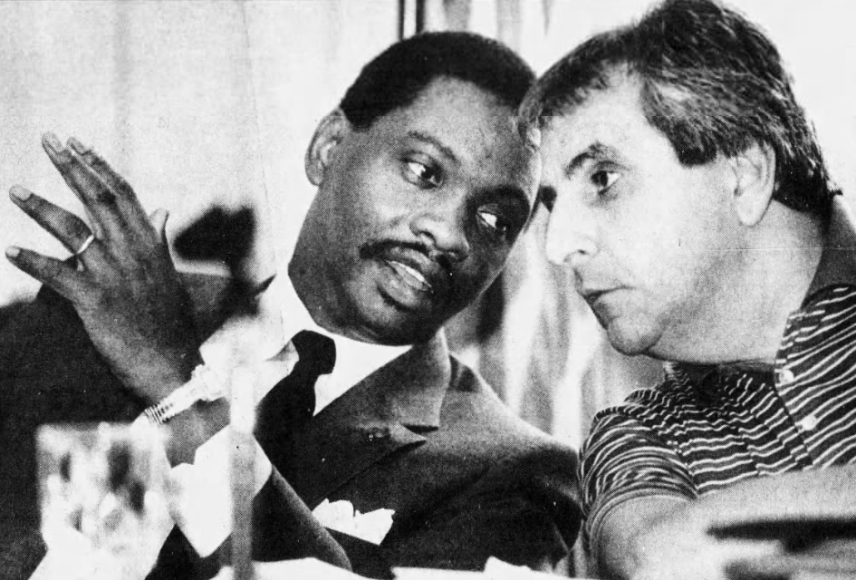
- Marotta (right) with Norvel Goff, 1986

Deputy Mayor of Hartford, Connecticut
- In office 1985–1990
- Mayor: Thirman Milner; Carrie Saxon Perry

Member of the Connecticut House of Representatives from the 5th district
- In office January 31, 1990 – January 1993
- Preceded by: Anthony J. Palermino
- Succeeded by: Marie Lopez Kirkley-Bey

Personal details
- Born: Alphonse Salvatore Marotta; November 27, 1934 Hartford, Connecticut, U.S.
- Died: December 17, 2024 (aged 90) Wethersfield, Connecticut, U.S.
- Party: Democratic
- Spouse: Lucy Marotta
- Education: Hillyer College

Alphonse Salvatore Marotta (November 27, 1934 – December 17, 2024) was an American politician. A member of the Democratic Party, he served as deputy mayor of Hartford, Connecticut from 1985 and 1990 and in the Connecticut House of Representatives from 1990 to 1993.

== Life and career ==
Marotta was born in Hartford, Connecticut, the son of Salvatore Marotta and Angela Musumeci. He attended Hillyer College, earning his engineering degree. He was a councilman.

Marotta served as deputy mayor of Hartford, Connecticut from 1985 to 1990.

On January 30, 1990, Marotta defeated Daniel R. Seals in the special general election for the 5th district of the Connecticut House of Representatives, winning 59 percent of the votes. He succeeded Anthony J. Palermino. He assumed office on January 31, 1990, and served until January 1993, when he was succeeded by Marie Lopez Kirkley-Bey.

== Death ==
Marotta died on December 17, 2024, in Wethersfield, Connecticut, at the age of 90.
