= National Alliance for Law and Economic Development =

Political party in Burundi

The National Alliance for Law and Economic Development (ANADDE) , or The Alliance Nationale pour le Droit et le Développement in French, is a small, predominantly ethnic Tutsi political party in Burundi. In 2000, they were one of the three parties to sign a peace agreement in an effort to end the then seven-year civil war that had plagued the country.
