= Alfonse Borysewicz =

American painter

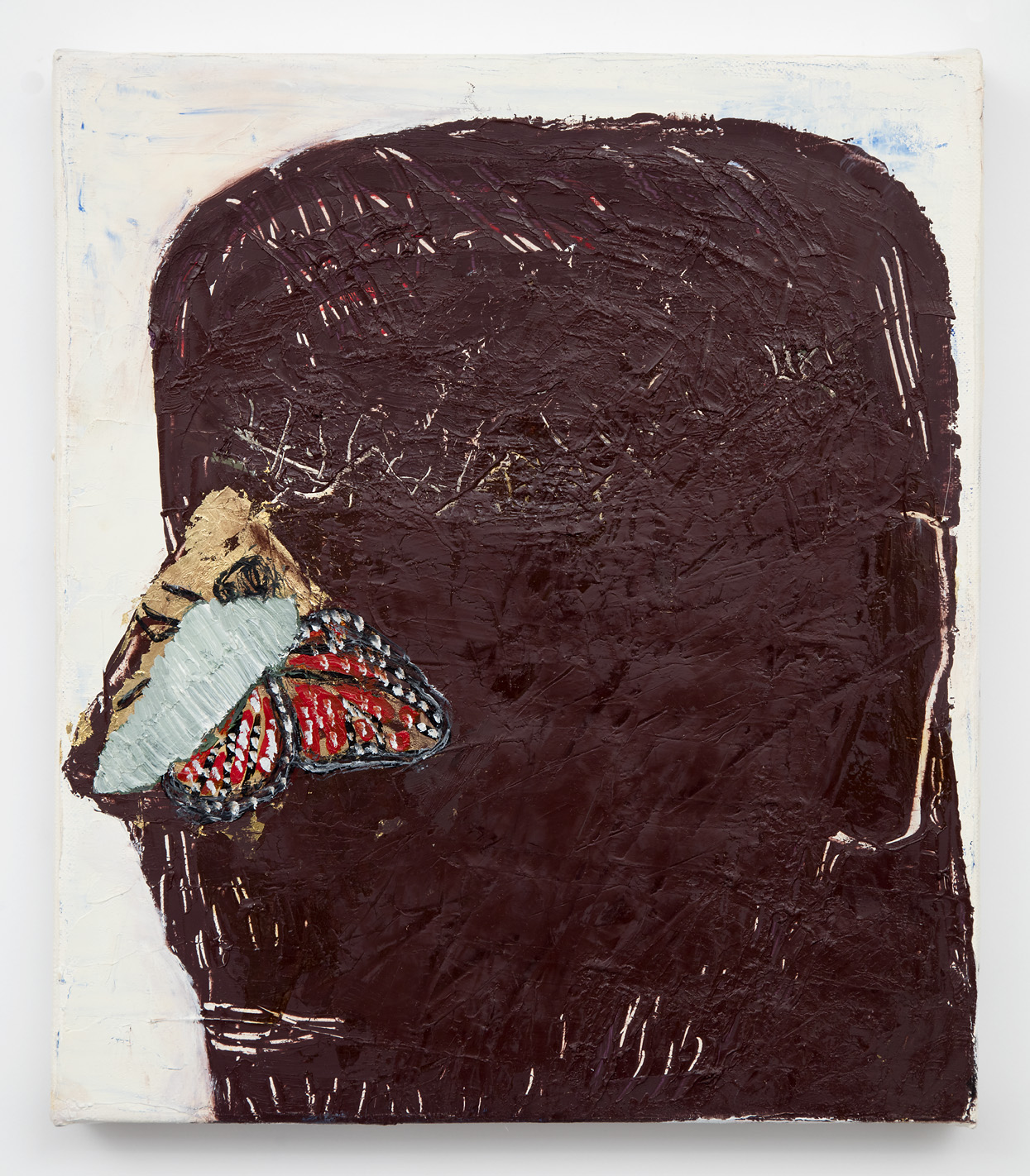
- Born: Alfonse John Borysewicz; April 27, 1957; Detroit, Michigan, U.S.
- Website: www.alfonseborysewicz.com

Alfonse Borysewicz (born April 27, 1957) is a Brooklyn-based painter. He received his B.A. from Sacred Heart Seminary and M.A. from St. John’s Provincial Seminary. He later attended the Studio School of the Museum of Fine Arts in Boston (1982–1984). He is the recipient of two fellowships from the Pollock-Krasner Foundation (1987, 1992) and a Guggenheim Fellowship (1995). Gregory Wolfe, an editor at Image, calls Borysewicz "one of the most important religious artists since the French Catholic Georges Rouault.”

== Works ==
Borysewicz describes the work of his seminary years (pre-1981) as “garish––sort of Otto Dix meets Marc Chagall.” After seminary, where he was taught and mentored by Edgar Yaeger, Borysewicz moved to Boston where he was, in his words, “exhibiting neo-expressionist, angst ridden paintings.” The works from this period are on un-stretched canvas and covered with a mixture of paint, mud, sand, leaves and in some cases crayon and gold leaf. More than one critic has noted the influence of Cy Twombly, and one reviewer in particular, parallels with Jean-Michel Basquiat. Many of these early works include animals, but the scenes are rarely pastoral. In fact, they have been described as “an imagined hell of grotesque beasts.” Significant works from this period include Cow (1983), Encyclical (1984) and The Passion (1984), all of which were included in the 1984 exhibition, "Emerging Massachusetts Painters," at The Institute of Contemporary Art, Boston.

According to Joseph Masheck, formerly Editor-in-chief of Artforum, "Borysewicz is essentially an abstract painter, but on behalf of a religious thematic his works have long been able to accommodate iconographic signs (Western sense). At the same time, as one who has executed an altarpiece and a processional cross for the Brooklyn Oratory (spiritual equipment, one could say), Borysewicz has always struck me as the contemporary painter best attuned to the Byzantine, and then Orthodox, icon as a highly abstract image capable of tendering a spiritual, even devotional, stance in virtue of its highly stylized semiotic."

=== Lectios ===
Describing these works, Robert Lue writes: "Often rough like the early banners, the Lectio works differed in that they appeared to be made from the remnants of some glorious icon.... Borysewicz literally strives to recreate meaning by bringing together splinters of sacred imagery with the basic wood and metal of our physical domain. Both tragic and gracefully matter-of-fact, they represent an honest coming to terms with the bankruptcy of the transcendent referent." This theme of retrieval is consistent with Borysewicz's paintings and works on paper that often feature collaged pieces of pages from icon books.

== Collections ==
- Abbey of Our Lady of Gethsemani, Trappist, KY
- Corpus Christi Church, New York, NY
- DeCordova Sculpture Park & Museum, Lincoln, MA
- General Electric
- Grand Rapids Theological Seminary of Cornerstone University, Grand Rapids, MI
- Iglesia de San Jose, Esmeralda, Cama guess, Cuba
- Manressa Retreat Center, Dublin, Ireland
- The Microsoft Art Collection, Redmond, WA
- The Oratory Church of St. Boniface, Brooklyn, NY
- Pontifical Council for Culture, Vatican
- Rose Art Museum, Brandeis University, Waltham, MA
- St. Francis College, Brooklyn, NY

== Reviews ==
- David Joselit, “Alfonse Borysewicz,” Currents, n.1 (September 1983), n.p.
- Thomas Frick, “Alfonse Borysewicz at Stavarides,” Art in America (March 1986), 154.
- Joseph Masheck, “Alfonse Borysewicz,” Tema Celeste (May–June 1991), n.p.
- Linda Yablonsky, “Alphonse [sic] Borysewicz: Yoshii Gallery,” (February 1994), 86.
- Pepe Karmel, "Art in Review", New York Times (February 10, 1995).
- Steve Mumford, “Alphonse [sic] Borysewicz: Richard Anderson Gallery through January 30,” Review: The Critical State of Visual Art in New York (December 15, 1998), 10–11.
- Sarah Schmerler, “Alfonse Borysewicz: Richard Anderson Fine Arts, through Jan 30 (see Chelsea),” Time Out: New York, n.174 (January 21–28, 1999), 55.
- Jonathan Goodman, “Alfonse Borysewicz at Richard Anderson,” Art in America (May 1999), 151.
- Joseph Masheck, "Mentors, Muses and Mystery: Alfonse Borysewicz at First Things Gallery," Art Critical (May 5, 2017).

== Catalogues ==
- Alfonse Borysewicz. New York: Richard Anderson Fine Arts, 1992. Published in conjunction with the exhibition “Paintings-Strata,” shown at Richard Anderson Fine Arts, New York. Includes an essay by Robert Lue.
- Alfonse Borysewicz. New York: Richard Anderson Fine Arts, 1997. Published in conjunction with the exhibition “Paintings,” shown at Richard Anderson Fine Arts, New York.
- Alfonse Borysewicz. New York: Yoshii Gallery, 2003. Published in conjunction with the exhibition “New Paintings” shown at Yoshii Gallery, New York.
- Alfonse Borysewicz: Fragments. Orange City, IA: Northwestern College, 2004. Published in conjunction with the exhibition of the same name shown at Northwestern College, Orange City, IA. Includes an essay by George Prochnik.
