= C. Alphonso Smith =

American professor, college dean, philologist and folklorist

Charles Alphonso Smith
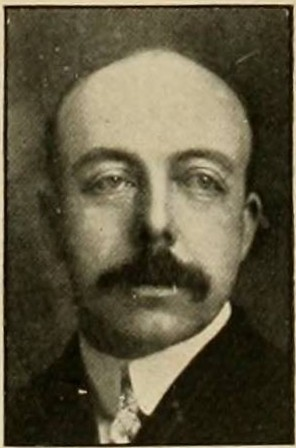
- Born: May 28, 1864; Greensboro, North Carolina
- Died: June 13, 1924 (aged 60); Annapolis, Maryland
- Education: Davidson College; Johns Hopkins University
- Occupations: Writer, professor of English
- Spouse: Susan McGee Heck (m. 1905)
- Children: 2

Charles Alphonso Smith (May 28, 1864 – June 13, 1924) was an American professor of English, college dean, philologist, and folklorist.

== Life ==
Smith was born in Greensboro, North Carolina. His parents were Jacob Henry Smith, and his second wife, Mary Kelly (Watson) Smith. Growing up in Greensboro, he was acquainted with William Sydney Porter, working then as a clerk, later to become the writer known as O. Henry. They were close friends. On November 15, 1905, Smith married Susan McGee Heck, with whom he had two sons and one daughter. He died unexpectedly on June 13, 1924, while on the faculty at Annapolis.

Smith received his A.B. degree from Davidson College, from which he graduated Phi Beta Kappa, and in 1887 earned his M.A. from the same institution. He received a Ph.D. from Johns Hopkins University in 1893. His dissertation was titled The Order of Words in Anglo Saxon Prose.

=== Career ===
Smith was appointed Professor of English at Louisiana State University, where he taught from 1893 to 1902. He moved to the University of North Carolina in 1902 as head of its English department, and was appointed the first dean of its graduate school in 1903. He founded and edited the journal Studies in Philology. From 1909 to 1917 he taught at the University of Virginia, where he was appointed the first Edgar Allan Poe Professor of English. He was temporarily away from that position from 1910 to 1911, while he served as Theodore Roosevelt Exchange Professor at the University of Berlin. Finally, in 1917 he became Head of the English Department at the United States Naval Academy.

Smith received degrees of LL.D. from the University of Mississippi, and an LL.D. from the University of North Carolina, and the degree of L.H.D. from the University of Cincinnati.

He was a founder of the Virginia Folklore Society. An important collection of his research, Traditional Ballads of Virginia, was edited by A. K. Davis Jr. and published posthumously in 1929.

Smith's two most famous books are What Can Literature Do for Me?, a popular introduction to literary studies, and his biography of O. Henry, a more serious, academic work.

== Works ==
- The order of words in Anglo-Saxon prose (1893)
- Repetition and parallelism in English verse; a study in the technique of poetry (1894)
- Anglo-Saxon grammar and exercise book, with inflections, syntax, selections for reading, and glossary (c1896)
- An Old English grammar and exercise book with inflections, syntax, selections for reading, and glossary (1896)
- Why young men should study Shakespeare (1902)
- Studies in English syntax (1906)
- The significance of history in a democracy (1909)
- The American short story (1912)
- What can literature do for me? (1913)
- Ballads surviving in the United States (1916)
- O. Henry biography (1916)
- Keynote studies in keynote books of the Bible (c1919)
- New words self-defined (1919)
- Edgar Allan Poe; how to know him (1921)
- Literary Contrasts: Selected and Edited Published posthumously (1925)
