= Hartford Electric Light Company =

Defunct electrical company

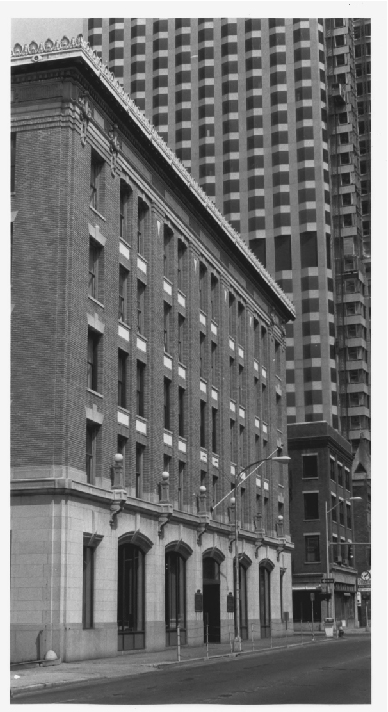
Pearl Street Headquarters of The Hartford Electric Light Company

The Hartford Electric Light Company (HELCO) is a defunct electrical company that was located on Pearl Street in Hartford, Connecticut. HELCO merged with the Connecticut Power Company in 1958. These merged with the Connecticut Light and Power Company (CL&P) and the Western Massachusetts Electric Company (WMECO) in 1966 to form Northeast Utilities (NU). Its former corporate headquarters building and main facility are in the Ann Street Historic District.

== History ==
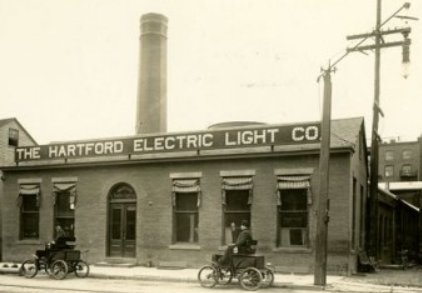
The Hartford Electric Light Company, original Pearl Street plant, circa 1902

The history of the Hartford Electric Light Company (HELCO) begins with the Hartford Steam Company. The steam company built the originally brick building in 1880 (See 'The Hartford Electric Light Company, Pearl Street plant, circa 1902'). The building had about a dozen boilers for producing heat and steam for their customers. The steam company introduced a new technology in 1881, an electric generator. It was Hartford's first electric service.

The Hartford Electric Light Company (HELCO) in 1881 received its charter as an official company and took over the electrical part of Hartford Steam Company. At that time Hartford had about a thousand gaslights in 80 miles of the city streets. It began actual operations of the steam-powered electrical generating plant on Pearl Street in 1882. Austin Cornelius Dunham was the company's first president. The first major project the company did was electrical lighting to the Asylum Street railroad station in 1883. HELCO ultimately made Hartford the first city in America with an all-electric street lighting system.

== Dutch Point ==
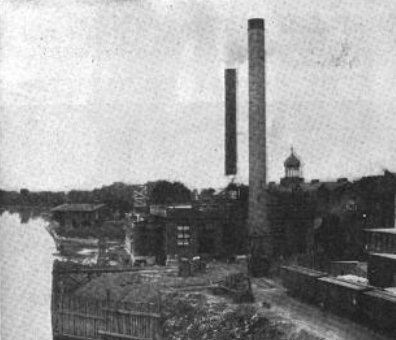
Dutch point power plant, circa 1909

Hartford Light and Power Company, HELCO's competitor, bought the steam company and HELCO eventually vacated by 1887. HELCO bought Hartford Light and Power Company in 1896. They then returned to their original Pearl Street plant. The Hartford Electric Light Company operated the first steam turbine by a public utility to produce electricity in America. The steam turbine electrical generator was called Mary-Ann. It was installed at their Pearl Street plant in 1901. The Pearl Street plant also powered the city's street cars. The plant became a substation in 1905 when HELCO's Dutch Point plant was constructed and put in full operation.

Dutch point in Hartford was so named because the Dutch under Adrian Block landed there in 1614, which was about two decades before the English settlers came there. This plant started in operation in 1905, and before this the main electricity supply for the city of Hartford came from the original Pearl street plant of the Hartford Electric Light Company.

== Tariffville Powerhouse ==
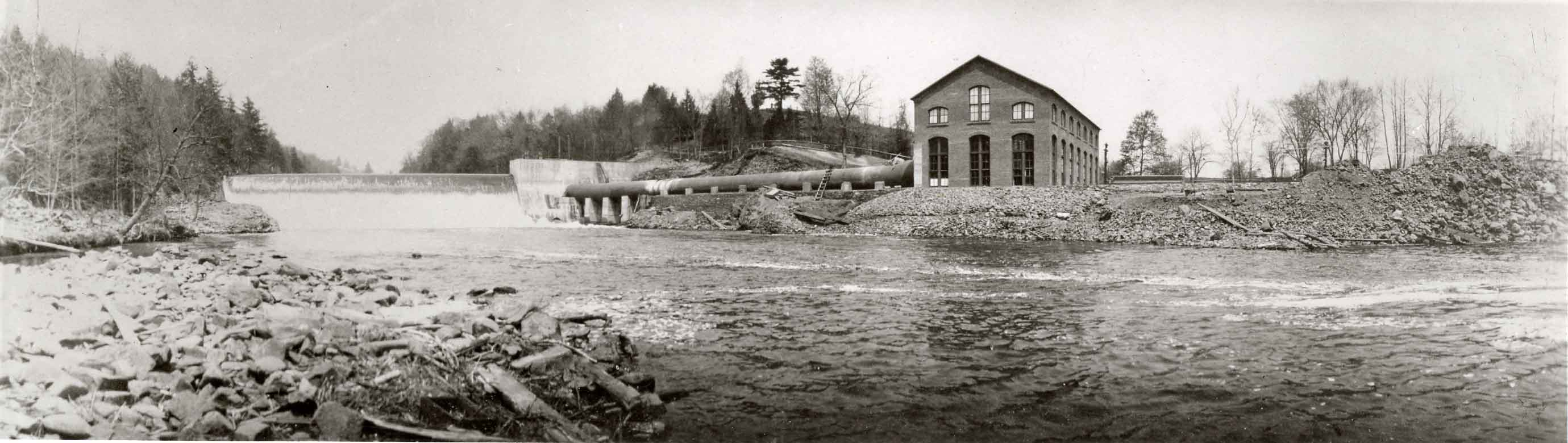
Tariffville Dam and hydroelectric station

HELCO constructed in 1899 a dam on the Farmington River at Tariffville, which is on the edge of the town of Simsbury, Connecticut. There a powerhouse was built to generate electricity. This power plant was built with two pairs of 1300 horsepower water wheels. They connected to two seven-hundred kilowatt generators made by Westinghouse. This was the first time aluminum was used for the conductors in a transmission line. The Tariffville dam with the powerhouse was destroyed by flooding that came about because of two sequential hurricanes in August 1955.

== Connecticut Power Company ==
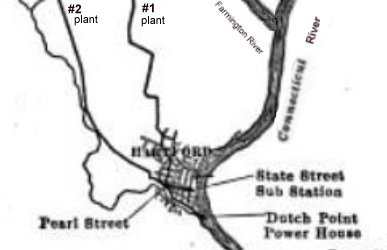
HELCO electrical network in 1909

The Connecticut Power Company was formed in 1899 as the Marine Power Company. A 1909 engineering report describes the station and its equipment as having two water-power stations (See 'HELCO electrical network in 1909') operated in conjunction with it (#1 plant & #2 plant). The two electrical generator plants were located on the Farmington river about twelve miles from Hartford. The three plants were connected together and regulated at the main plant and supplied all the electricity for Hartford.

The Connecticut Power Company entered into a power exchange agreement with HELCO in 1915 where they would work together to get electricity to each other's customers as needed. HELCO built a power station in 1921 at South Meadows in Hartford.

HELCO had just over three thousand customers in 1900. Fifty years later their customer base was almost ninety thousand. At that time they served Hartford and the surrounding area of about two hundred and fifty square miles. HELCO merged with the Connecticut Power Company in 1958. These merged with the Connecticut Light and Power Company (CL&P) and the Western Massachusetts Electric Company (WMECO) in 1966 to form Northeast Utilities (NU).

== Innovations ==
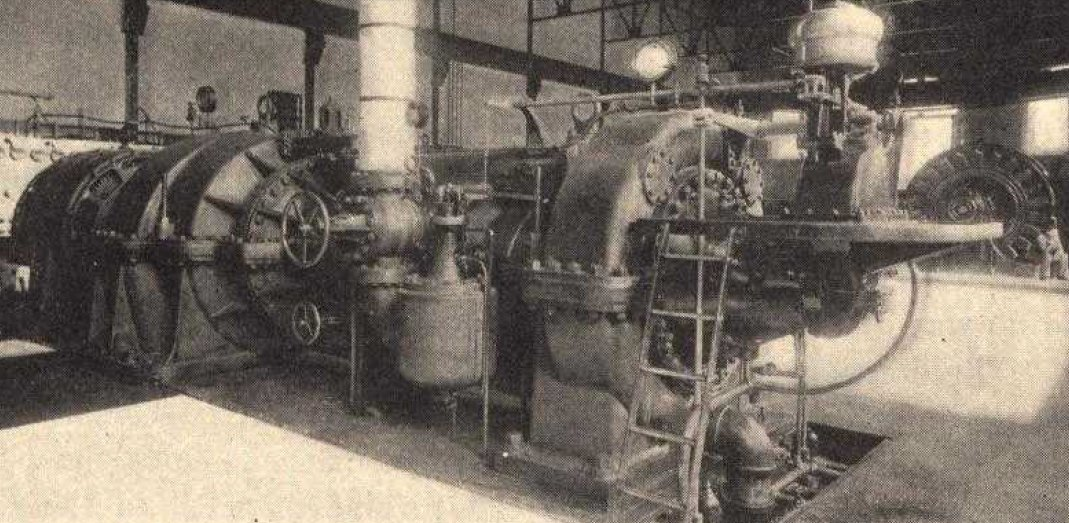
"Mary-Ann" steam turbine electric generator 1901

HELCO was the first company in America to use a steam turbine for a public utility to generate electricity. They installed the steam turbine generator in 1901 and it became known as "Mary-Ann."

HELCO made several innovations in the electrical industry. They became standard practices. HELCO was the first electric company in the United States to transmit three-phase alternating current at high voltage for long distances. The company did this in 1893 from their Rainbow Hydroelectric Station in Windsor, Connecticut, to its main station in Hartford – some eight miles away. Hartford Electric Light Company was the first to use a storage battery in conjunction with the electricity produced at a hydraulic powerhouse. The innovation made it possible to collect and store water power energy that would have gone unused during low demand periods. This energy could then be returned when the demands were higher.

The president of HELCO invented an electric range that had a broiler, cooker, and roaster. The company marketed the electric range. There were about 20,000 ranges put into homes throughout the Hartford area. HELCO's president received patents for an electrical radiator to heat water and an ice-making machine. Many of the homes of Hartford had these electrical appliances by 1915.

== Ann Street Historic District ==
(2026)

The original property at 266 Pearl Street is within the Ann Street Historic District and is now the Connecticut Light & Power Company.

== Sources ==
- Iron (1902). Iron and Machinery World.
- Kane, Joseph Nathan (1997). Famous First Facts, Fifth Edition. The H. W. Wilson Company. ISBN 0-8242-0930-3. "The first steam turbine operated by a public utility to produce electricity was a 1,500-kilowatt steam turbine installed in April 1901 by the Hartford Electric Light Company, Hartford, CT, at its Pearl Street station. The turbine, manufactured by the Westinghouse Electric and Manufacturing Company, East Pittsburgh, PA, began to generate electricity in October 1901."
