= Ildefonso (disambiguation) =

Ildefonso may refer to:

- Ildefonso (given name)
- Danny Ildefonso (born 1976), Filipino former basketball player
- Ildefonso Islands, a group of Chilean islands
- HMS Ildefonso, a British Royal Navy ship, originally the Spanish ship San Ildefonso, captured at the Battle of Trafalgar

== See also ==
- San Ildefonso (disambiguation)
