= Alphonso Sumner =

Alphonso M. Sumner was an African American man who opened Nashville, Tennessee's first Black school. Sumner was also a barber, a newspaper publisher, and a Northern abolitionist.

== Early life and Nashville school ==
In the early 1830s, Sumner lived in Nashville, where he worked as a free Black barber. Despite the restrictive "Black Laws" of the South, which became increasingly severe following Nat Turner’s rebellion in 1831, Sumner sought to provide education to the local Black community. He opened his school March 4, 1833 with about 20 students. The school grew to have a student body of around 200 by 1836. The majority of the pupils were free Black children, but a few may have been enslaved. The rapid growth of the school led him to hire Daniel Wadkins be a teacher. In 1836 Sumner was nearly whipped to death by white vigilantes as he was accused in helping two runaway slaves. Soon afterward he moved to Cincinnati, Ohio where he worked as an abolitionist.

== Newspaper founder and publisher ==
In Cincinnati, Sumner was the founder and a publisher for the Disfranchised American, that city's first Black newspaper. Frederick Douglas wrote to Sumner on December 18, 1849 in his capacity as editor, explaining that an article Sumner published had not been about him.

== Legacy ==
Although Sumner was forced into exile, the foundation he laid in Nashville persisted. His former assistant, Daniel Wadkins, reopened a school in 1838, continuing the tradition of "clandestine" education for Nashville's Black population until the mid-1850s.
