= Lylah M. Alphonse =

American journalist (born 1972)

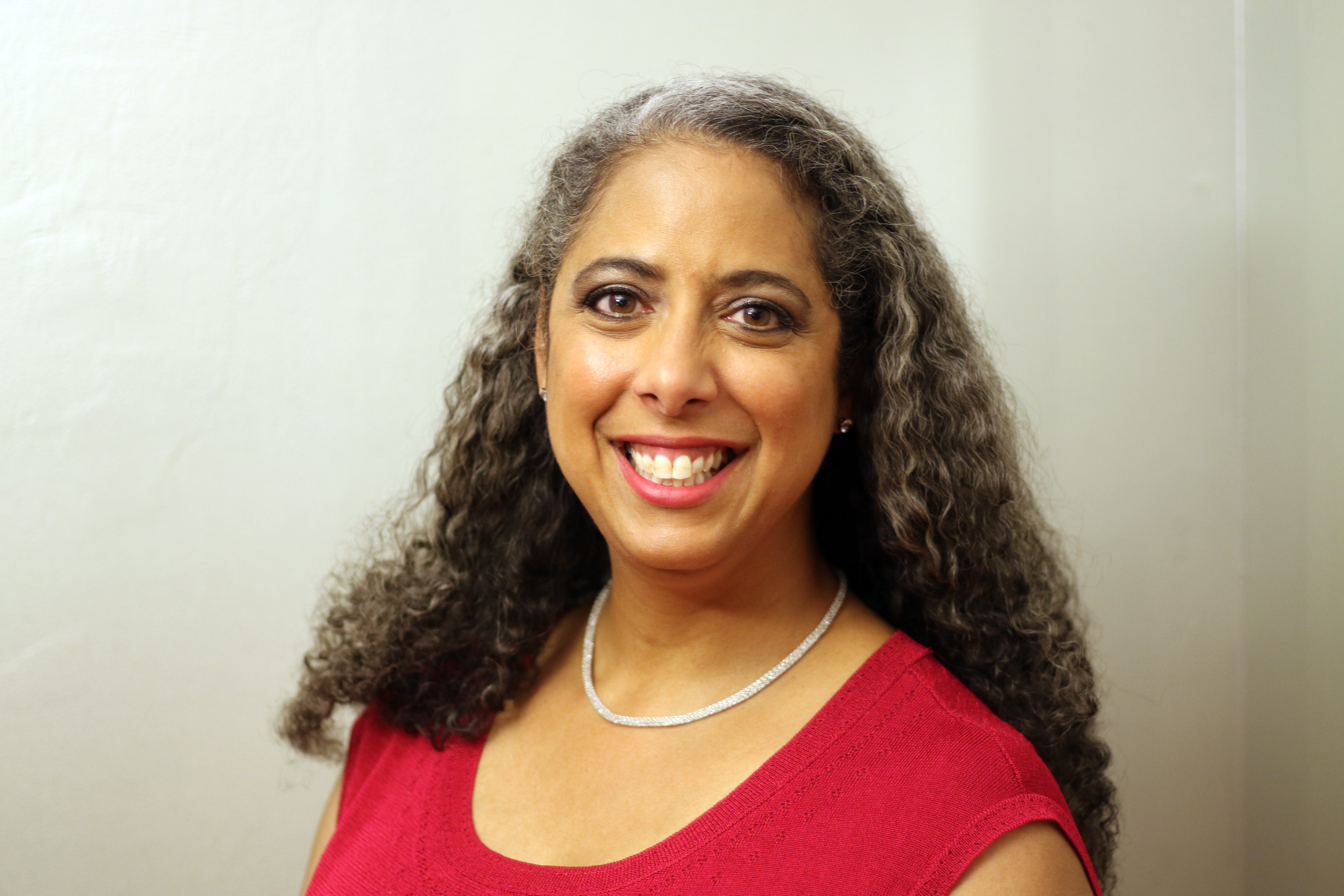
- Born: 1972 (age 53–54); Princeton, New Jersey, U.S.
- Education: S.I. Newhouse School of Public Communications
- Occupation: journalist
- Known for: The Boston Globe; U.S. News & World Report
- Parents: Gerard A. Alphonse (father); Tehmina M. Alphonse (mother)

Lylah M. Alphonse (born 1972) is an American journalist.

== Early life ==
Alphonse was born in Princeton, New Jersey, the oldest child of Gerard A. Alphonse, a Haitian electrical engineer, inventor and research scientist, and Tehmina M. Alphonse, a Parsi restaurateur from India. She attended Princeton Day School, graduating in 1990.

== Education ==
A graduate of the S.I. Newhouse School of Public Communications at Syracuse University, Alphonse was inducted to the Newhouse School's Alumni Hall of Fame in 2000. In 2025, she was awarded the Princeton Day School Alumni Achievement Award, which honors alumni who have achieved excellence in their chosen field and who have made a commitment to helping others.

== Career ==
In 1994, Alphonse began working as an editor at The Boston Globe in Boston, where she eventually became a member of the newspaper's Sunday magazine staff. She also wrote frequently for their Travel, Food, National & Foreign News, and Living/Arts sections. She has also been Consulting Editor for the Fezana Journal, Managing Editor at Work It, Mom!, and Senior Editor and Writer at Yahoo.com, where she covered news, parenting trends, health, women's issues, and politics and interviewed First Lady Michelle Obama, presidential advisor Valerie Jarrett, and others.

She became the managing editor for special reports at U.S. News & World Report in June 2013, and was promoted to managing editor for news a year later. After a brief tenure as Senior Vice President of Laurel Strategies, a strategic communications firm based in Washington, D.C., she rejoined The Boston Globe as the editor of their Rhode Island bureau in October 2020. In March 2023, The Boston Globe launched their New Hampshire bureau with Alphonse "editing and shaping Boston Globe New Hampshire as well."

Alphonse formerly wrote the blog The 36-Hour Day blog and Write. Edit. Repeat., is the author of Triumph Over Discrimination: The Life Story of Farhang Mehr (ISBN 0-9709937-0-6), and has contributed articles to Our Times (5th edition, Bedford Books, 1998) and Interactions: A Thematic Reader (Houghton Mifflin Co., 1999). She is a frequent guest on WGBH-TV news shows in Boston and offers commentary on Rhode Island PBS Weekly in Rhode Island.
