= Alphonse Bertrand =

Canadian politician

Alphonse Bertrand (August 23, 1846 – April 8, 1926) was a Canadian merchant and politician in New Brunswick. He represented Madawaska County in the Legislative Assembly of New Brunswick from 1895 to 1899 as a Conservative member.

He was born and educated in Quebec City, the son of Isaac Bertrand and Elizabeth Kennedy. Bertrand was customs collector for the port of Edmundston from 1865 to 1867. After that, he was in business at Fort Kent, Maine until 1887 when he returned to Edmundston. In 1880, he married Catherine Kate Hartt, a niece of John Costigan. He was defeated in the 1899 provincial election. After retiring from politics, he joined the federal public service.
