= St. Patrick - St. Anthony Church (Hartford, Connecticut) =

St. Patrick - St. Anthony Church and The Franciscan Center for Urban Ministry
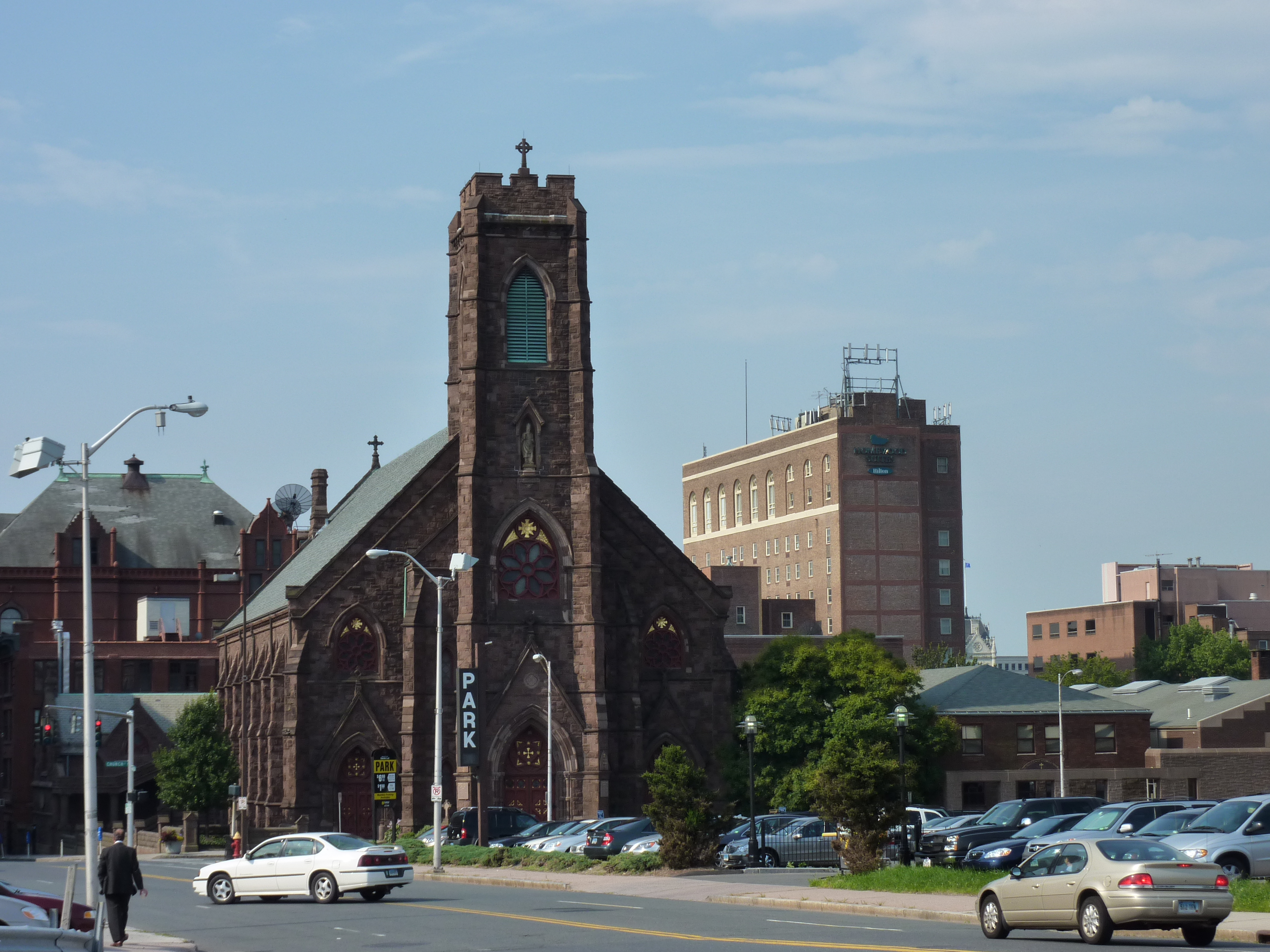
- Location: 265 Church Street, Ann Street Historic District, Hartford, Connecticut
- Country: United States
- Denomination: Roman Catholic
- Website: http://www.spsact.org/

History
- Status: Active
- Founded: 1829
- Dedication: Saint Patrick; Saint Anthony of Padua

Architecture
- Architectural type: Gothic Revival

- St. Patrick - St. Anthony Church
- U.S. National Register of Historic Places
- Location: 265 Church Street, Hartford, Connecticut
- Built: 1849
- Architect: Patrick C. Keeley
- Architectural style: Gothic Revival
- MPS: Ann Street Historical District
- NRHP reference No.: 83003514
- Added to NRHP: 1984

St. Patrick - St. Anthony Church is a Cathedral-style Church located at 265 Church Street, Hartford, CT. The church is part of the Roman Catholic Archdiocese of Hartford. It is the oldest Roman Catholic parish in the state of Connecticut.

Saint Patrick Parish in Hartford was founded in 1829, making it the first parish in Connecticut, while Saint Anthony Parish was founded by Italian immigrants in the 1890s. The parishes merged in 1958 to form Saint Patrick - Saint Anthony parish. The current church sits on the site of an 1850s church destroyed by fire in 1875, and a rebuilt 1876 church itself partially destroyed in 1956. The combined parish rebuilt the current church within the walls of the 1876 building. The main church was added to the National Register of Historic Places in a Multiple Property Submission study of Ann Street Historic District Complexes in 1984.

== History ==
=== Saint Patrick ===
The parish that would become Saint Patrick parish was founded to serve an influx of Irish immigrants to Hartford in 1829, making it the oldest permanent parish in both Hartford and the state of Connecticut as whole. At the time, Connecticut was still part of the part of the Diocese of Boston; the Diocese of Hartford would not be established until 1843. In 1830, the newly erected parish bought the recently vacated old Christ Church Episcopal church building, and moved it to the corner of Talcott Street and Main Street. This building was consecrated for Catholic worship as Holy Trinity Church (not to be confused with the 1903 Catholic church of the same name on Capitol Avenue in Hartford).

In 1850, construction on the original St. Patrick's Church at the corner of Church Street and Anne Street was begun by John Brady. In 1853, the original Holy Trinity Church building on Talcott Street caught fire and was destroyed. The newly built 1850s Saint Patrick Church on Church Street itself burnt down in January 1875. Mass was held in Allyn Hall while the church was being rebuilt on the Church Street site.

The second Saint Patrick Church on Church Street was dedicated by Bishop Thomas Galberry on November 19, 1876, and consecrated in November 1885. The interior of the 1876 church was destroyed by another fire in 1956. In 1958, Saint Patrick parish was merged with nearby Saint Anthony parish, and the newly merged parish rebuilt for a third time the current Saint Patrick-Saint Anthony Church within the walls of the gutted 1876's building.

=== Saint Anthony ===
St. Anthony's was the founded as the national parish for the Italian community of Hartford in the 1890s. When the founding pastor, Angelo Chicaglione, returned to Italy in February 1895, he was succeeded by his assistant, Edward Flannery. The parish moved to Market Street in 1921, however the new building was seriously damaged by flooding in 1936 and 1938. In the 1950s, redevelopment eliminated much of the Italian neighborhood served by St. Anthony. After Saint Anthony parish was merged with Saint Patrick parish in 1958, the Market Street church building was sold to the city and demolished for redevelopment.

In 1990, the Franciscan Friars were invited to serve at the parish, and begin an urban outreach ministry.
