= Gerard A. Alphonse =

Haitian electrical engineer, physicist and research scientist

Gerard A. Alphonse is a Haitian-American electrical engineer, physicist and research scientist.

== Biography ==
Alphonse received a BSEE (1958) and MSEE (1959) from New York University, and a PhD in Electrophysics from Brooklyn Polytechnic Institute in 1967.

As documented in the book by Alexander Magoun, Alphonse spent much of his career at the RCA Labs later to become spun off as the Sarnoff Institute. He invented and demonstrated the world's highest performance superluminescent diode in 1986. The device is a broadband semiconductor light source and key component of next-generation fiber optic gyroscopes, low coherence tomography for medical imaging, and external cavity tunable lasers with applications to fiber optic communications.

Alphonse was the 2005 president of the United States division of the Institute of Electrical and Electronics Engineers (IEEE). He has served on several of IEEE's committees and boards.

He holds more than 50 U.S. patents, was inducted into the New Jersey Inventors' Hall of Fame in 2005, and in 2016 was honored with the Marcus Garvey Lifetime Achievement Award by the Institute for Caribbean Studies in Washington, D.C.

== Personal life ==
His daughter is the journalist Lylah M. Alphonse.
