= Alphonso =

Alphonso or Alfonso is a masculine given name and occasional nickname which may refer to:

== Aristocrats ==
=== Iberia ===
- Alfonso I of Aragon (1104–1134), known as el Batallador (The Battler)
- Alfonso I of Asturias (739–757)
- Alfonso II of Aragon (1162–1196)
- Alfonso II of Asturias (791–842)
- Alfonso II of Naples (1448–1495)
- Alfonso III of Aragon (1285–1291)
- Alfonso III of León (866–910)
- Alfonso IV of Aragon (1327–1336)
- Alfonso IV of León (925–931)
- Alfonso V of Aragon (1416–1458), also king of Naples and Sicily
- Alfonso V of León (999–1028)
- Alfonso VI of León (1065–1109)
- Alfonso VII of León (1126–1157)
- Alfonso VIII of Castile (1158–1214)
- Alfonso IX of León (1188–1230)
- Alfonso X of Castile (1252–1284)
- Alfonso XI of Castile (1312–1350)
- Alfonso XII of Spain (1857–1885) (ordinal numbering continues from the kings of Castile)
- Alfonso XIII of Spain (1886–1931)
- Alfonso Fróilaz, briefly king of the unified kingdom of Asturias, Galicia and León in 925
- Alfonso, Prince of Asturias (1453–1468), figurehead of rebelling magnates against his brother King Henry IV of Castile
- Infante Alfonso of Spain (1941–1956), younger brother of King Juan Carlos of Spain
- Alfonso of Spain, Prince of Asturias, heir apparent of the throne of Spain

=== Elsewhere ===
- Alfonso I d'Este (1476–1534), Duke of Ferrara
- Alfonso II d'Este (1533–1597), Duke of Ferrara
- Alfonso II, Count of Provence (1180–1209), second son of Alfonso II of Aragon
- Alfonso III d'Este (1591–1644), Duke of Modena and Reggio
- Alfonso of Capua (c. 1120 – 1144), Prince of Capua
- Prince Alfonso, Count of Caserta (1841–1934), Duke of Calabria and head of the royal house of the Two Sicilies
- Prince Alfonso of Hohenlohe-Langenburg (1924–2003), Spanish playboy and businessman
- Alfonso Jordan (1103–1148), Count of Tripoli, Count of Rouergue, Count of Toulouse, Margrave of Provence and Duke of Narbonne
- Infante Alfonso, Duke of Calabria (1901–1964), claimant to the title of the head of the House of Bourbon-Two Sicilies
- Alphonso, Earl of Chester (1273–1284), first son of Edward I of England, heir apparent to the English throne
- Prince Alfonso of Liechtenstein (born 2001), grandson of Hans-Adam II

== Others ==
- Alfonso of Valladolid (c. 1270 – c. 1347), Jewish convert to Christianity, philosopher, and mathematician
- Alphonso Calhoun Avery (1835–1913), American lawyer, Confederate military officer, and politician
- Alphonso Boone (1796–1850), American pioneer in what is now Oregon
- Alfonso Calderon (activist) (born 2001), Spanish-born American gun control activist
- Alfonso Calderón (poet) (1930–2009), Chilean poet and writer
- Al Campbell (born 1954), Jamaican reggae singer
- Alphonso Carreker (born 1962), American former National Football League player
- Alfonso Cuarón (born 1961), Mexican cinematographer
- Alphonso Giovanni Giuseppe Roberto D'Abruzzo, birth name of Robert Alda (1914–1986), American actor
- Alphonso Joseph D'Abruzzo, birth name of Alan Alda (born 1936), American actor, son of Robert Alda
- Alphonso Davies (born 2000), Ghanaian-born Canadian soccer player
- Mike Espy (born 1953), American lawyer and politician
- Alfonso Delgado Evers (born 1942), Argentinian prelate
- Alphonso Ford (1971–2004), American basketball player
- Alphonso Gerard (1916–2002), American Negro league baseball player
- Alphonso Jackson (born 1945), American politician, United States Secretary of Housing and Urban Development
- Alphonso Johnson (born 1951), American jazz bassist
- Buck Johnson (born 1964), American former basketball player
- Alfonso Lizarazo (born 1940), Colombian host and politician
- Alphonso Lingis (1933–2025), American philosopher, writer, and translator
- Alphonso Lisk-Carew (1883–1969), Sierra Leonean photographer
- Alphonso M. Lunt (1837–1917), Union Army sergeant awarded the Medal of Honor
- Alphonso McAuley, 21st century American actor
- Alfonso Mejia-Arias (born 1961), Mexican musician, writer, social activist, and politician
- Alfonso Morales (journalist) (1949–2020), Mexican sports journalist
- Alfonso Oiterong, Palauan politician, vice president
- Alfonso Pérez (born 1972), Spanish former footballer
- Alfonso Pérez (boxer) (born 1949), Colombian former boxer
- Alfonso Quiñónez Molina (1874–1950), Salvadoran politician, physician, and president (1913–1914, 1918–1919, 1923–1927)
- Alfonso Ribeiro (born 1971), American actor and game show host
- Alphonso Theodore Roberts (1937–1996), Vincentian political activist and cricketer
- Alfonso John Romero (born 1967), American video game designer
- Alphonso Sgroia (1886–1940), New York City gangster and murderer
- Alphonso Smith (born 1985), American former National Football League player
- Alphonso C. Smith (1894–1945), Canadian politician
- C. Alphonso Smith (1864–1924), American English professor, college dean, philologist, and folklorist
- Alfonso Soriano (born 1976), American Major League Baseball player
- Alphonso Sumner, African American newspaper publisher and abolitionist who opened the first Black school in Nashville, Tennessee in 1833
- Alphonso Taft (1810–1891), American jurist, diplomat, and politician, United States Attorney General and Secretary of War under President Ulysses S. Grant, father of President William Howard Taft
- Alphonso Wilson (1860–1936), African-American activist
- Alphonso Wood (1810–1881), American botanist and theology instructor

== Nickname ==
- Alphonso Cox (1908–1964), American Negro League pitcher
- Alphonso Sharland, member of the pop-rock band The Hoosiers

== Fictional characters ==
- Don Alfonso, in Mozart's opera Così fan tutte
- Alphonso, protagonist in Alfonso und Estrella, an opera by Franz Schubert
- Alphonso Ali, a minor character in the comic strip Bloom County
- Alfonzo Dominico Jones, a dog in the Australian television series SeaChange
- Al MacKenzie, a Marvel Comics character
- Alfonso "French" Sosa, a main character from The OA, an American television series

== See also ==
- "Alfonso" (song), a 2013 song by Levante
- Alphonsus Liguori (1696–1787), Roman Catholic theologian
- Alphons
- Alphonse
