= Alphonse Roque-Ferrier =

- Born: 2 August 1844
- Died: 18 June 1907 (aged 62)
- Occupation: Philologist

Alphonse Roque-Ferrier (2 August 1844 – 18 June 1907) was a French philologist and historian of the occitan language. He was a member of Félibrige. He argued for a union of Southern European countries.

== Early life ==
Alphonse Roque-Ferrier was born in 1844.

== Career ==
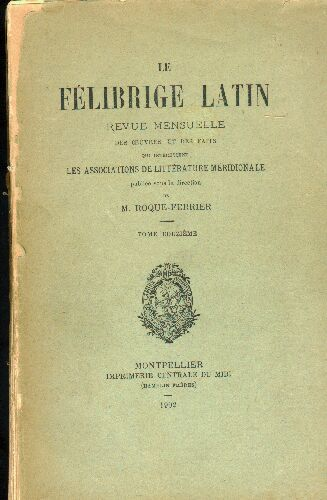
Le Félibrige Latin: Revue Mensuelle, edited by M. Roque-Ferrier.

Roque-Ferrier was a philologist and historian of the Occitan language. He was the secretary of the Société pour l'étude des langues romanes.

Roque-Ferrier was a member of Félibrige, a French regionalist organization to defend and promote occitan languages and literature.

In De l’idée latine dans quelques poésies en espagnol, en langue d’oc et en catalan (1877), he drew upon the works of Octavien Bringuier and argued for Latinity or the "Latin idea," the notion that people who spoke Romance languages and whose culture originated in Ancient Rome were a specific "race."

With Charles de Tourtoulon, another member of the Félibrige, Roque-Ferrier was a frequent visitor to Barcelona, Spain. Additionally, both men were proponents of a union of Southern European countries.

== Death ==
He died in 1907.
