= Alphonse Martin (water polo) =

Belgian water polo player (1930–1997)

Personal information
- Nationality: Belgian
- Born: 18 April 1930 Antwerp, Belgium
- Died: 5 November 1997 (aged 67)

Sport
- Sport: Water polo

Alphonse Martin (18 April 1930 – 5 November 1997) was a Belgian water polo player. He competed at the 1948 Summer Olympics and the 1952 Summer Olympics. Martin died on 5 November 1997, at the age of 67.
