= Spanish Christmas Lottery =

National Christmas lottery in Spain

Extraordinary Christmas Draw
- Region: Spain
- First draw: March 12, 1812
- Operator: Loterias y Apuestas del Estado
- Highest jackpot: €400,000 (per décimo)
- Odds of winning jackpot: 100,000 to 1
- Shown on: Televisión Española

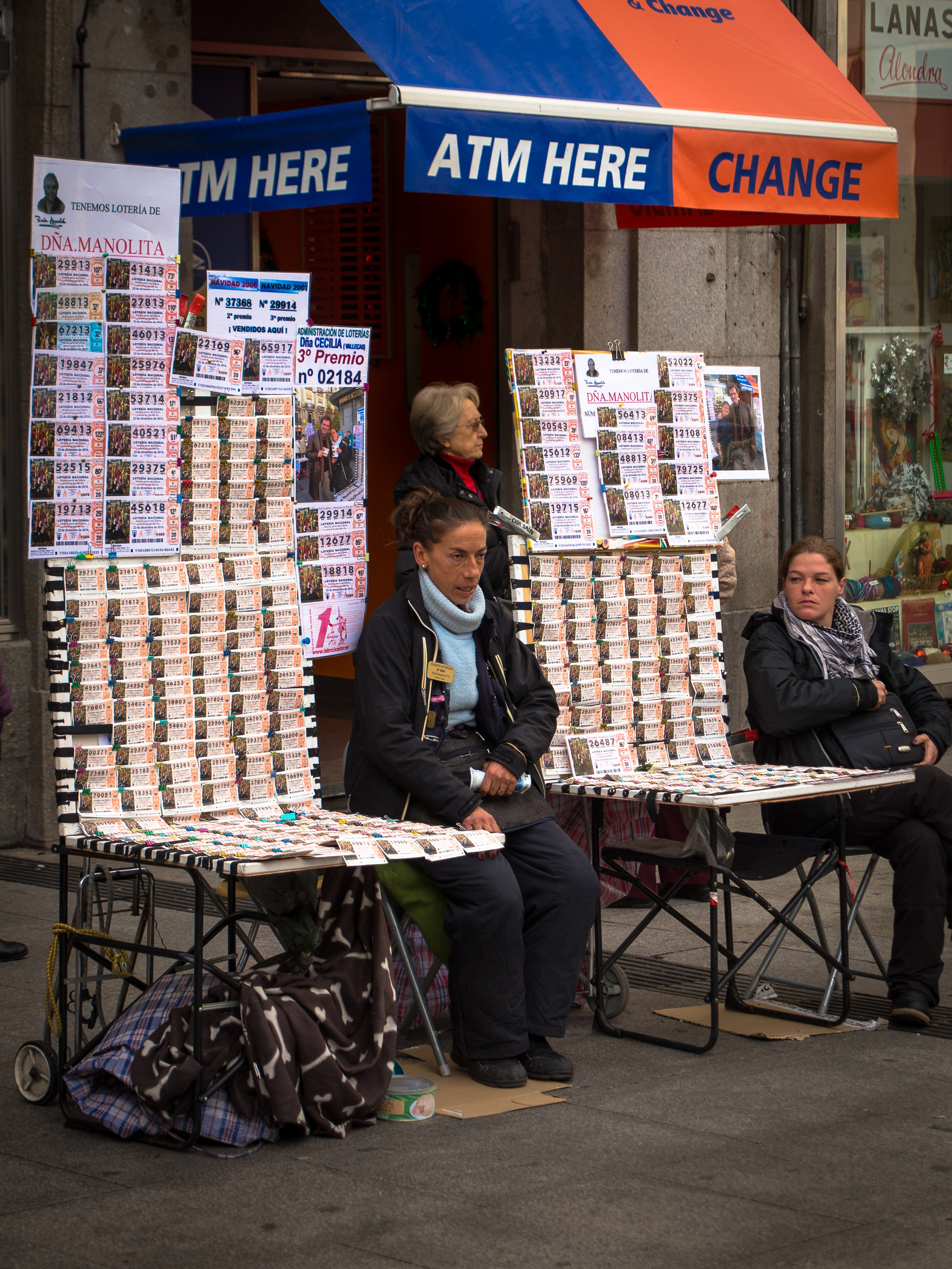
Street vendors of Christmas lottery at Puerta del Sol, Madrid

The Spanish Christmas Lottery (officially Sorteo Extraordinario de Navidad [soɾˈteo e(ɣ)stɾaoɾðiˈnaɾjo ðe naβiˈðað] or simply Lotería de Navidad [loteˈɾi.a ðe naβiˈðað]) is a special draw of Lotería Nacional, the weekly national lottery run by Spain's state-owned Loterías y Apuestas del Estado. The extraordinary Christmas draw takes place every 22 December and it is the biggest and most popular draw of the year.

As measured by the total prize payout, the Spanish Christmas Lottery is considered the biggest lottery draw worldwide. In 2026, with 205 million pre-printed €20 tickets to sell (décimos), the maximum total amount available for all prizes would be €4.1 billion (seventy per cent of ticket sales). The total amount for the first prize El Gordo ("the big one") would be €820 million.

In the Spanish-speaking and the English-speaking media it is sometimes just called El Gordo, even though that name really refers to the first prize for any Spanish lottery.

== History ==
Lotería Nacional, with its first draw held on 4 March 1812, is the second-longest continuously running lottery in the world, just behind Dutch Staatsloterij running since 1726. This includes the years during the Spanish Civil War when two draws were held, one on each warring side. The first Lotería Nacional draw held at Christmas was on 18 December 1812 in Cádiz and the grand prize was for the number 03604. The first time that the Christmas draw was extraordinary was in 1818, (Note: The price of tickets for the extraordinary draws of Lotería Nacional and the prizes are higher than those of ordinary draws.) and the first time the name Sorteo de Navidad was officially used was in 1897.

== Ticket numbers and prizes ==
As all Lotería Nacional draws, the special Christmas draw is based on tickets (billetes) which have five-digit numbers, from 00000 to 99999. Since this system only produces 100,000 unique ticket numbers, each ticket number is printed multiple times, in several so-called series. The series is also identified on each ticket by a series number. In this way, the lottery organizer is able to sell more than 100,000 tickets each year, numbered from "Series 001 Ticket 00000" through "Series xxx Ticket 99999", where xxx is the total number of series printed in a given year. In 2025, there are 198 series of 100,000 tickets each, for a total of 19,800,000 tickets available at €200 each. If all €4.1 billion worth tickets were sold, there would be €2.870 billion (seventy percent of ticket sales) available for prizes.

Because the €200 ticket price may be prohibitive for many purchasers, each of the pre-printed tickets is actually a perforated tear-apart sheet of ten identical sub-tickets (or fractions) sold for €20 each. Each one of these fractions is known as a décimo (one-tenth). Each décimo is entitled a ten per cent of any prize that the ticket has won.

Tickets are officially sold in official lottery shops throughout the country as well as by sellers on the street. Frequently a shop will sell a ticket number in all series meaning that all the winners of that ticket will have purchased their tickets in that location. This sometimes leads to a small village full of grand prize winners. Locations where previous grand prize winners were sold often becomes a location of lottery pilgrimage where thousands of people will buy their ticket. The tickets are also sold outside of Spain, usually online, and often with a markup in price.

On a private basis, or through associations, charities, workplaces, sports teams, cafés, shops, and other organizations, it is also possible to buy or be given a fraction of a décimo (one-tenth ticket). Many organizations buy décimos and divide them further into shares and sell them to the public, colleagues, or members of an association. Usually, with charities and special organizations, a small transaction fee is applied which is effectively a donation to the organization. Street sellers may take a commission earning a small profit. Such shares are made by writing the ticket number and the amount paid on a piece of paper and then signed. The paper is a legal contract in Spain and proof of participation in the ticket. If the ticket is a winner, anyone holding a share will be entitled to their proportional amount of the prize payout. For example, a charity may buy a décimo and split it further into ten more shares, in this case selling them for €2 each plus €1 extra as a donation to the charity. If their number wins, they will get a one percent of the prize (one-tenth of one-tenth).

For 2026, there are 205 series of 100,000 tickets (from 00000 to 99999) at €200 each. The maximum ticket sales of €4.1 billion would produce a prize payout of €2.87 billion (seventy percent of ticket sales). For each one of the 205 series, the prize structure is the following:

Quantity	Prize	Description	Total
1	€4,000,000	First Prize (El Gordo)	€4,000,000
1	€1,250,000	Second Prize	€1,250,000
1	€500,000	Third Prize	€500,000
2	€200,000	Fourth Prizes	€400,000
8	€60,000	Fifth Prizes	€480,000
1,794	€1,000	La Pedrea	€1,794,000
2	€20,000	For the two numbers just one unit above and below the First Prize	€40,000
2	€12,500	For the two numbers just one unit above and below the Second Prize	€25,000
2	€9,600	For the two numbers just one unit above and below the Third Prize	€19,200
99	€1,000	For the 99 numbers with the same first three digits of the First Prize	€99,000
99	€1,000	For the 99 numbers with the same first three digits of the Second Prize	€99,000
99	€1,000	For the 99 numbers with the same first three digits of the Third Prize	€99,000
198	€1,000	For the 99 numbers with the same first three digits of each of the Fourth Prizes	€198,000
999	€1,000	For the 999 numbers with the same two last digits as the First Prize	€999,000
999	€1,000	For the 999 numbers with the same two last digits as the Second Prize	€999,000
999	€1,000	For the 999 numbers with the same two last digits as the Third Prize	€999,000
9,999	€200	For the 9,999 numbers with the same last digit as the First Prize (Reintegro)	€1,999,800
Total per series			€14,000,000
Total for the 205 series			€2,870,000,000

In 2025, the €4,000,000 El Gordo was paid to every series of number 79432. Every series of numbers 79431 and 79433 obtained the corresponding €20,000 approximation prizes. Additionally, every series of numbers between 79400 and 79499 (excluding El Gordo but including approximations) obtained the €1,000 prizes for the numbers with the same first three digits of El Gordo. Every series of numbers ending in "32" (excluding El Gordo) obtained €1,000, and every series of numbers ending in "2" (excluding El Gordo) obtained a refund of €200.

The exact quantity of tickets and series, and their prices, may be different each year. For example, in 2004, there were 66,000 different numbers in 195 series. In 2005, there were 85,000 numbers in 170 series, whereas in 2006 the number of series was increased to 180. Since 2011 there have been 100,000 different numbers in 180 series. Distribution of prizes can also change, as in 2002 with the introduction of the Euro, or in 2011, when El Gordo increased from €3,000,000 to €4,000,000, the second prize increased from €1,000,000 to €1,250,000, the fifth prizes increased from €50,000 to €60,000, and 20 more prizes of €1,000 were added. In 2013 the number of series was reduced from 180 to 160 to adjust to the expected demand. In 2017 the number of series was increased from 160 to 170; in 2020, to 172; in 2022, to 180; in 2023, to 185; in 2024, to 193; in 2025, to 198, and in 2026, to 205.

== Draw ==
The drawing traditionally takes place on the morning of 22 December. In the past, the drawings took place at the Loterias y Apuestas del Estado hall in Madrid, in 2010 and 2011 it was held at the Palacio de Congresos de Madrid, and since 2012 at the Teatro Real in Madrid. Pupils of the San Ildefonso school (formerly reserved for orphans of public servants) draw the numbers and corresponding prizes, delivering the results in song to the public. Until 1984, only boys from San Ildefonso participated in the drawing; that year Mónica Rodríguez became the first girl to sing the results, including the fourth prize of 25 million pesetas. The public attending the event may be dressed in lottery-related extravagant clothing and hats. The state-run Televisión Española and Radio Nacional de España, and other media networks, broadcast live the entire draw, which is also livestreamed.

Two large spherical cages are used. The largest one contains 100,000 small wooden balls, each with a unique five-digit ticket number on it, from 00000 to 99999. The smaller cage contains 1,807 small wooden balls, each one representing a prize written in Euros:

- 1 ball for the first prize (El Gordo).
- 1 ball for the second prize.
- 1 ball for the third prize.
- 2 balls for the fourth prizes.
- 8 balls for the fifth prizes.
- 1,794 balls for the small prizes, called la pedrea, literally "the pebble-avalanche" or "stoning".

Inscriptions on the wooden balls are nowadays made with a laser, to avoid any difference in weight between them. They weigh 3 grams (0.11 oz) and have a diameter of 18.8 millimetres (0.74 in). Before being thrown into the vessels, the numbers are shown to the public for anyone to check that the balls with their numbers are not missing.

As the drawing goes on, a single ball is extracted from each of the revolving spheres at the same time. One child sings the winning number, the other child sings the corresponding prize. The balls have holes on them so they can be placed onto long wires, which are stored in frames for later verification. When a major prize is drawn, both children pause, sing the prize and winning number multiple times and show the balls to a committee, and then to a fixed camera with two Phillips screwdriver heads mounted at the front, all before being inserted in the wires with the others. This is repeated until the smaller vessel (the prize-balls) has been emptied. Due to the sheer number of prizes, this procedure takes several hours. The children work in about ten shifts, equal to the number of frames to be filled. Once the first prize (El Gordo) is declared, its winning number is instantly broadcast on television, online, and on public screens.

Once each frame is filled, it undergoes several checks and verifications to certify the winning numbers and their corresponding prizes that it contains. Apart from the prizes drawn from the vessel, some prizes are calculated from the winning numbers (view the table with prizes above). Once everything has been verified, the official list of prizes is generated and sent to the Royal Mint, which is responsible for printing it. This official list is distributed –physically and electronically– that same afternoon to the lottery shops and the media so that everyone can check their tickets.

The winning numbers are those on the official prize list, regardless of what the children have sung, since they could have made a mistake. One of the most notorious errors when singing occurred in 1987, when the children sang number 20864 with a pedrea of 125,000 pesetas, but when the draw officer saw the balls in the wires he noticed that the number was actually 20064, and it had won instead El Gordo, worth 250 million pesetas.

The two-vessels system was the traditional system used by Lotería Nacional in all its draws, but nowadays it is only used in the Christmas draw. Since 1965 the rest of the ordinary and extraordinary Lotería Nacional draws use five spherical cages with ten balls each (numbered 0 to 9), from where the five digits of the winning numbers are drawn.

Non-winners are known to claim "it's health that really matters" after losing. Those who get their money back often re-invest it in a ticket for Sorteo Extraordinario de El Niño, the second most important Lotería Nacional draw, held every 6 January, the Epiphany of Jesus day.

== Odds ==
The smallest prize is the reintegro, tickets that end with the same last digit as the First Prize get the money back. This means ten per cent of all tickets get the money back. There is a 5.3% chance of winning higher prizes meaning more than fifteen per cent of all tickets win some prize which is a significantly higher winning rate than most other lotteries. The prize structure makes it easier to win some money compared to other lotteries, and it is common saying that the prizes of the Christmas Lottery are well distributed all around Spain. Chances of winning El Gordo are 1 in 100,000, that is 0.001%, while chances of winning the top prize of EuroMillions are 1 in 139,838,160 or 0.00000072%, and chances of winning the top prize of Mega Millions are 1 in 302,575,350 or 0.00000000330496189%.

The overall odds of winning some prize at the Extraordinary Christmas Draw of Lotería Nacional are 1:6.5, which is a 15.38%. The odds of winning each of the prizes are the following:

Prize	Odds of winning
1st prize (El Gordo)	1:100,000
2nd prize	1:100,000
3rd prize	1:100,000
4th prize	1:50,000
5th prize	1:12,500
Tickets with numbers one below and above the 1st prize	1:50,000
Tickets with numbers one below and above the 2nd prize	1:50,000
Tickets with numbers one below and above the 3rd prize	1:50,000
For all numbers which have the same first three digits as the 1st prize	1:1,010
For all numbers which have the same first three digits as the 2nd prize	1:1,010
For all numbers which have the same first three digits as the 3rd prize	1:1,010
For all numbers which have the same first three digits as the 4th prize	1:505
For all numbers which have the same last two digits as the 1st prize	1:100
For all numbers which have the same last two digits as the 2nd prize	1:100
For all numbers which have the same last two digits as the 3rd prize	1:100
La Pedrea	1:56
For all numbers which have the same last digit as the 1st prize (Reintegro)	1:10

== El Gordo ==
The climax of the drawing is the moment when El Gordo is drawn. Lottery outlets usually sell multiple series –even all– of the numbers assigned to them, so the winners of the largest prizes often live in the same area, work for the same company, or are members of the same association. In 2011, El Gordo was sold entirely in Grañén (Huesca), a town with about 2,000 people. In 2010, €414 million of the first prize were sold in three locations in Barcelona, and the rest of the €585 million of El Gordo was distributed between Madrid, Tenerife, Alicante, Palencia, Zaragoza, Cáceres, and Guipúzcoa. In 2006, the first prize was sold in eight different lottery outlets across Spain, while the second prize was only ever sold in a kiosk on the Puerta del Sol in central Madrid.

In 2005, the 1st, 2nd, 3rd and both 4th prizes were awarded in full: the €510 million of El Gordo were sold in Vic (Barcelona), a town with 37,825 inhabitants. The €170 million from the 2nd prize were sold in Valencia, and the €81.5 million from the 3rd prize, in Mataró (Barcelona). Finally, €34 million from the first 4th prize went to Málaga, and the other €34 million, to Barakaldo (Biscay). In 2011, all 180 series of the number 58.268, El Gordo, were sold in Grañén (Huesca) with around 2,000 inhabitants.

As a misconception in many non-Spanish speaking countries, it is often assumed that the term El Gordo is specific for the Christmas Lottery; some even think that El Gordo is in fact the name of the lottery. However, the real meaning of El Gordo is simply "the first prize" (literally "the fat one" or more accurately "the big one"); other lotteries have their Gordo as well. To add to the confusion, there is a relatively new weekly Spanish lottery game called El Gordo de la Primitiva, which has nothing in common with the Christmas lottery, except the fact that it is organized by the Spanish public lottery entity Loterias y Apuestas del Estado.

=== El Gordo prizes ===
The price of each ticket and the prize of El Gordo have varied over the years. As mentioned above, the price of a décimo is one tenth of a ticket, and the prize that corresponds to it is also one tenth of the prize corresponding to the ticket.

Years	Price per ticket	El Gordo prize per ticket
1812–1849	100 pts	40,000 pts
1850–1875	100 pts	15,000,000 pts
1876–1943	500 pts	15,000,000 pts
1944–1952	1,000 pts	15,000,000 pts
1953–1956	2,000 pts	15,000,000 pts
1957–1964	4,000 pts	15,000,000 pts
1965–1966	4,000 pts	37,500,000 pts
1966–1969	4,000 pts	75,000,000 pts
1970–1976	10,000 pts	75,000,000 pts
1977–1979	10,000 pts	200,000,000 pts
1980–1989	25,000 pts	250,000,000 pts
1990	30,000 pts	250,000,000 pts
1991–2001	30,000 pts	300,000,000 pts
2002–2004	200 €	€2,000,000
2005–2010	200 €	€3,000,000
2011–present	200 €	€4,000,000
