= Alphonse =

Alphonse or Alfonse may refer to:

- Alphonse (given name), a list of people and fictional characters
- Alphonse (surname), a list of people
- Alphonse Atoll, Seychelles

== See also ==
- Alphons
- Alfonso (disambiguation)
