= Antonina Uccello =

American politician (1922–2023)

Hartford City Council
- In office 1963–1967

Mayor of Hartford, Connecticut
- In office December 5, 1967 – April 12, 1971
- Preceded by: George B. Kinsella
- Succeeded by: George A. Athanson

Personal details
- Born: May 19, 1922 Hartford, Connecticut, U.S.
- Died: March 14, 2023 (aged 100) Hartford, Connecticut, U.S.
- Party: Republican
- Occupation: Politician

Antonina P. Uccello (pronounced [utˈtʃɛllo] in Italian, and /juˈsɛloʊ/ in English) (May 19, 1922 – March 14, 2023), was an American politician who was Mayor of Hartford, Connecticut, from 1967 to 1971.

== Life ==
Uccello was born in Hartford, Connecticut, on May 19, 1922, to parents who had emigrated from the town of Canicattini Bagni, Sicily. She was the second born of five sisters.

She graduated from University of St. Joseph, and pursued graduate studies in law at Trinity College and University of Connecticut.

== Career ==
Ann Uccello, started working as a teacher in 1944, and in 1946 went to work for the department store G. Fox & Co., Hartford, Connecticut. There she rose to the rank of executive assistant to the owner. In 1963 she approached her boss and said she would like to run for the Hartford City Council. Since the council met on Mondays, a day the department store was closed, her boss gave her permission to run.

She won and served two terms on the council before being elected mayor in 1967. When she was elected the mayor of Hartford in 1967, she also became the first woman to be elected a mayor in Connecticut. She was also the first woman to be elected mayor of a US state capital.

She ran as a Republican in a mainly Democratic city, and remains the city's last Republican mayor to date. She was re-elected as mayor in 1969, and was subsequently asked by President Richard Nixon to go to Washington D.C. to work in the U.S. Department of Transportation, where she subsequently worked during the successive administrations of Presidents Gerald Ford and Jimmy Carter.

== Later life and death ==
After returning to private life in 1978, she remained involved in serving the community. She became board member or trustee of several private and public organizations. She also worked in the insurance business of a family member.

Uccello turned 100 in May 2022, and died on March 12, 2023, of natural causes.

== Honours ==
In 1971 Uccello was knighted Cavaliere della Repubblica by the Italian ambassador in the USA.

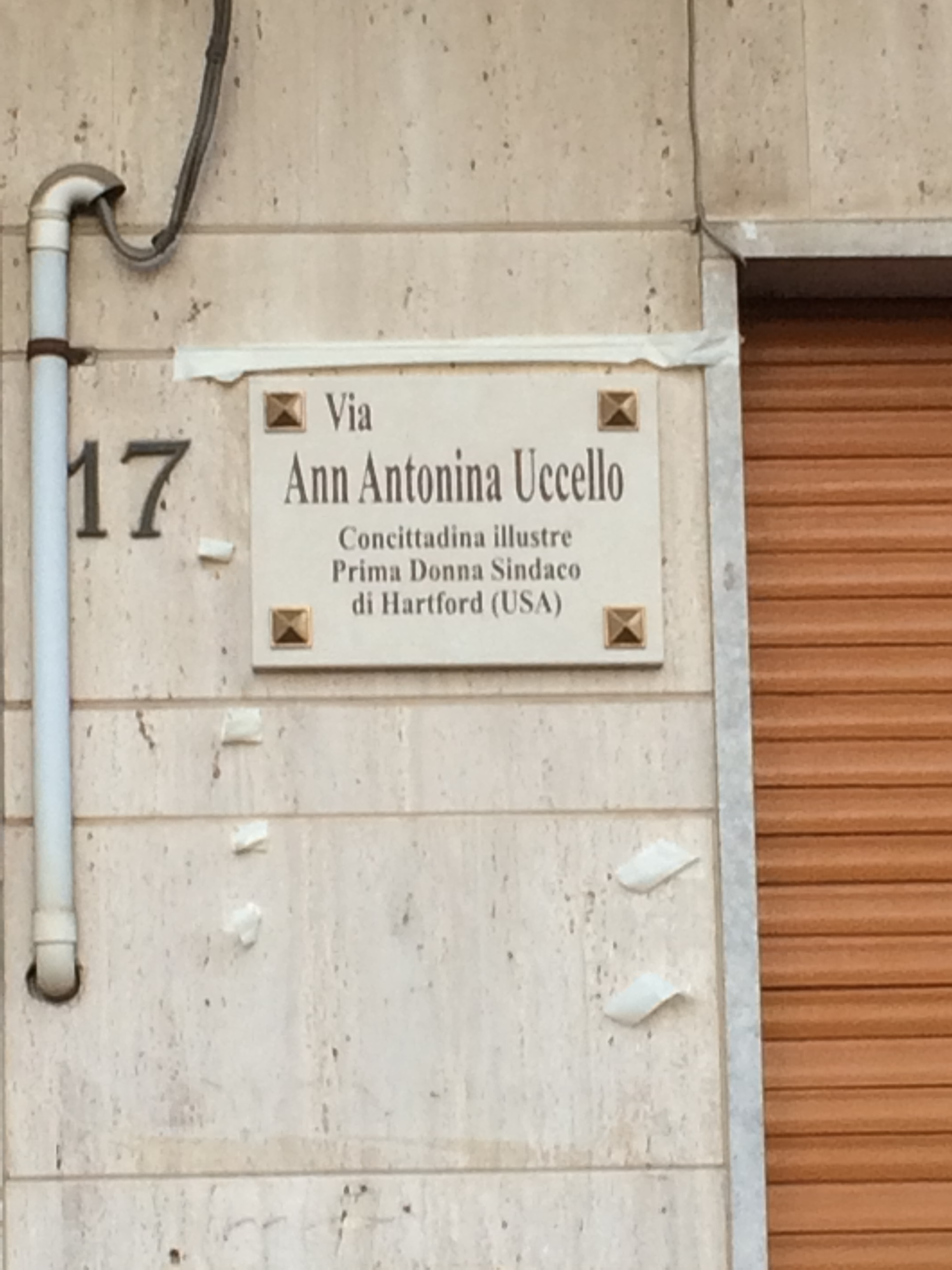
Sign for street named in honor of Ann Uccello, Canicattini Bagni, Italy, July 4, 2016

She was inducted into the Connecticut Women's Hall of Fame in 1999. Ann Street in Hartford, originally named for Ann Sheldon Goodwin in 1815, was renamed Ann Uccello Street in her honor in September 2008. Another street, in the town where her parents were from, Canicattini Bagni, Italy, was named after her in July 2016.
