= Alphonse Rabbe =

French writer, historian, critic, and journalist

Alphonse Rabbe (Alpes-de-Haute-Provence, 1784 (?) – Paris, 31 December 1829) was a French writer, historian, critic, and journalist.

== Life ==
Rabbe was a journalist, writing mostly about the arts. He also published a number of works of popularised history. Disfigured by syphilis and addicted to opium in an effort to make his life bearable, Rabbe is today remembered for his Album d'un pessimiste in which he writes of the pointlessness of existence. It was published posthumously in 1835. He is also thought to have penned a novel, La Sœur grise, but the manuscript has not survived. Despite his almost complete detachment from society, he was friends with some of the most important literary figures of his day including Victor Hugo, Alexandre Dumas, père, and Benjamin Constant. He died in 1829 from an overdose of laudanum. Though little known today, he inspired like-minded writers such as Baudelaire and Cioran.

== Works ==
- introduction to Voyage pittoresque en Espagne by A.Laborde, 1808
- Précis d'histoire de la Russie, 1812
- Résumé de l'histoire d' Espagne, 1823
- Résumé de l'histoire du Portugal, 1823
- Résumé de l'histoire de la Russie, 1825
- Histoire d'Alexandre I empereur de Russie, 1826
- Album d’un pessimiste (1835)
