= CEIP San Ildefonso =

Bilingual school in Madrid, Spain

Coordinates: 40.4129°N 3.7122°W

CEIP San Ildefonso is the second oldest school in Madrid, Spain. Its origins date from 1543, the year in which Carlos V granted a Royal Certificate to finance the school. It is dedicated to Saint Ildephonsus. For years, it catered to orphans of public servants but now the pupils are regular Madrid children including many immigrants.

== Bilingual program ==
CEIP (Note: Colegio de Educación Infantil y Primaria (college of early childhood and primary education) Anexo:Siglas y acrónimos, es.wikipedia.org, retrieved January 14, 2012) San Ildefonso participates in a bilingual program which was started in autumn of 2004 with British teaching assistants in 26 schools throughout Madrid. Children, starting in first grade or primero de primaria, have at least a third of their classes in English (or a minimum of nine hours).

== Spain's lottery ==
For two centuries, children from CEIP San Ildefonso have sung the winning numbers of the Spanish National Lottery, including the hugely popular Christmas draw. The first time the children sang was on March 9, 1871. As orphans, they were expected to be less susceptible to cheats.
