= Brandon McGee (politician) =

American politician

Brandon L. McGee Jr

Member of the Connecticut House of Representatives from the 5th district
- In office January 9, 2013 – January 7, 2022
- Preceded by: Marie Lopez Kirkley-Bey
- Succeeded by: Maryam Khan

Personal details
- Party: Democratic
- Spouse: Geralynn McGee
- Children: 2
- Education: Alabama State University (BA); Albertus Magnus College (MS)
- Profession: Activist

Brandon McGee is a Connecticut politician who formerly served as a state representative and was also a former candidate for Mayor of Hartford. He served four terms in the Connecticut House of Representatives. He was interviewed by Connecticut Public Radio in August 2019.

== Electoral history ==
=== 2012 ===
2012 Assembly District 5 primary results (Note: 2012 Primary Results.)
Party	Candidate	Votes	%
Democratic	Leo Canty	774	42.7%
Democratic	Brandon McGee	773 (Note: Figure provided is before the court-ordered recount.)	42.6%
Democratic	Donald Trinks	267 (Note: Number does not reflect the additional sealed vote of an individual wrongly thought to have been deceased.)	14.7%
Total votes		1,814 (Note: Total does not include two of the aforementioned votes cast.)	—

2012 Assembly District 5 primary runoff results (Note: Unofficial results.)
Party	Candidate	Votes	%
Democratic	Brandon McGee	1,095	53.8%
Democratic	Leo Canty	942	46.2%
Total votes		9,031	—

2012 Assembly District 5 results (Note: 2012 Election Results.)
Party	Candidate	Votes	%
Democratic	Brandon McGee	7,543	83.5%
Republican	Paul Panos	1,488	16.5%
Total votes		9,031	—

=== 2014–2016 ===
2014 Assembly District 5 results (Note: 2014 Election Results.)
Party	Candidate	Votes	%
Democratic	Brandon McGee	5,332	100%
Total votes		5,332	—

2016 Assembly District 5 results (Note: 2016 Statement of the Vote.)
Party	Candidate	Votes	%
Democratic	Brandon McGee	7,515	81.9%
Republican	Paul Panos	1,662	18.1%
Total votes		9,177	—

=== 2018–2019 ===
2018 Assembly District 5 primary results (Note: Unofficial results.)
Party	Candidate	Votes	%
Democratic	Brandon McGee	1,704	74.1%
Democratic	Lawrence Jaggon	597	25.9%
Total votes		2,301	—

2018 Assembly District 5 results (Note: 2018 Statement of the Vote.)
Party	Candidate	Votes	%
Democratic	Brandon McGee	6,474	85.0%
Republican	Charles Jackson	1,144	15.0%
Total votes		7,618	—

2019 Hartford mayoral Democratic primary results (Note: Unofficial results.)
Party	Candidate	Votes	%
Democratic	Luke Bronin (incumbent)	5,386	59.08%
Democratic	Eddie Perez	2,461	26.99%
Democratic	Brandon McGee	1,270	13.93%
Total votes		9,117	—
