= Bronin (surname) =

Bronin is a surname. Notable people with the surname include:

- Luke Bronin (born 1979), American politician and lawyer
- Sara Bronin (born 1978), American lawyer, professor, and architect
