= Eric D. Coleman =

American politician

Member of the Connecticut Senate from the 2nd district
- In office 1995–2017
- Preceded by: Thirman L. Milner
- Succeeded by: Douglas McCrory

Member of the Connecticut House of Representatives from the 1st district
- In office 1983–1995
- Preceded by: Felix Karsky
- Succeeded by: Kenneth Green

Personal details
- Born: Eric Dean Coleman; May 26, 1951 (age 75) New Haven, Connecticut, U.S.
- Party: Democratic
- Spouse: Pamela Coleman

Eric Dean Coleman (born May 26, 1951) is a Democratic politician in the United States. He served as state senator of Connecticut's 2nd District, representing Bloomfield, Hartford, and Windsor. He served as a state representative from 1983 to 1995, and held the position of Deputy President Pro Tempore in the Connecticut Senate.

Coleman is a graduate of Pomfret School, Columbia University, and the University of Connecticut School of Law.

In 2001, he became the first African-American to chair the Judiciary Committee, and now held the chairmanship of the Planning and Development Committee.

Coleman resigned from the Senate in 2017, and was subsequently nominated and then confirmed as a Superior Court judge in 2018.

On November 30, 2022, Coleman announced that he would run for Mayor of Hartford in 2023, following mayor Luke Bronin's decision to retire. He lost in the Democratic primary to Arunan Arulampalam.
