= Minnie Gonzalez =

Stateside Puerto Rican politician in Connecticut, U.S.

Member of the Connecticut House of Representatives from the 3rd district
- Incumbent
- Assumed office January 8, 1997
- Preceded by: Ilia Castro

Personal details
- Born: Guillermina Gonzalez; August 4, 1950 (age 76) Adjuntas, Puerto Rico
- Party: Democratic
- Spouse: Ramon L. Arroyo
- Education: University of Connecticut (MSW)

Minnie Gonzalez (born August 4, 1950) is an American politician serving as a member of the Connecticut House of Representatives since 1997, the 3rd district, comprising parts of Hartford. A member of the Democratic Party, She serves on the Appropriations, Public Safety, Legislative Management and Housing Committees, and is the president of Connecticut's Puerto Rican and Latino Caucus.

== Personal life ==
Gonzalez was born in Adjuntas, Puerto Rico, where she graduated from Adjuntas High School. She moved to Hartford, Connecticut in 1981, where she worked as a special deputy sheriff for Hartford County, and as an Assistant Registrar of Voters. She has three children, and currently lives in Hartford, Connecticut with her husband, Ramon L. Arroyo.

== Political career ==
In 1986, Gonzalez was elected to the Hartford Democratic town committee. In 1996, she ran for State Representative in the 3rd district, which is composed of the Parkville, Frog Hollow and Behind the Rocks neighborhoods in Hartford. She faced incumbent Democrat Ilia Castro in the Democratic primary, whom she defeated with 57% of the vote. In the general election, she easily defeated Republican Kevin Sheridan and petitioning candidate Harry Suarez.

She has served in many positions of leadership in the Connecticut House of Representatives, including as the Deputy Majority Leader from 2017 to 2021, and the Deputy Speaker from 2021 to 2025.

In 2007, she unsuccessfully ran for mayor of Hartford.

== Policy positions ==
=== Family court reform ===
Gonzalez, who raised her children as a single mother, is an outspoken advocate for family court reform. She sponsored legislation to create a rebuttable legal presumption that shared parenting is in the best interest of children with divorced parents, with exceptions for child abuse and neglect, and has sponsored legislation defining parental alienation as a form of child abuse, and to help children reconnected with their alienated mother or father.

In 2014, Gonzalez worked to reform the use of guardian ad litems, forcing transparency in their billing practices, and allowing parents to file motions to remove a guardian ad litem or attorney for their minor children. In 2019, she sponsored a bill to limit their use outside of severe cases identified by the Connecticut Department of Children and Families.

Gonzalez was a key legislator in preventing the re-appointment of controversial family court Judge Jane B. Emons, who had originally been appointed by governor Jodi Rell and proposed for reappointment in 2018 by governor Dannel Malloy. She, along with Republican Prasad Srinivasan and Democrat Ed Gomes, were the only three members of the Judiciary Committee to vote against her re-nomination, which eventually died in the House despite the positive committee vote.

=== Housing ===
Together with Representative Jason Rojas, Gonzalez sponsored a 2015 housing bill that would have required at least 75 percent of all new affordable housing projects to be built in affluent neighborhoods, in order to reverse the pattern of only building federally subsidized low-income housing in the poorest neighborhoods. The bill died without a vote.

=== Economic Issues ===
When governor Dannel Malloy proposed to cut Medicaid for single people in 2012, Gonzalez objected, asking: We want to fix our budget on the backs of poor people?.

Representative Gonzalez supports an increase of the minimum wage to $15 an hour. In 2019, she sponsored legislation that would increase the minimum wage from $10.10 to $11 in 2019 and then by another dollar each year until it reaches $15 in 2023.

=== Social Issues ===
Gonzalez has supported the use of police body cameras, to protect both police officers and citizens by providing objective truths about police engagements.

In 2019 Gonzalez has sponsored legislation to permit the sale and taxation of marijuana to adults over the age of 21, with some of the new tax proceeds earmarked to curb the opioids epidemic.
