= Mayoral elections in Hartford, Connecticut =

Elections are currently held every four years to elect the mayor of Hartford, Connecticut.

From 1947 until 1969, rather than being individually elected, a mayor was chosen from among the members of Hartford's city council. Both prior and subsequent to this, partisan direct elections have been held to sleet the city's mayor.

Elections were originally to two year terms. On November 5, 2002, residents of Hartford voted to make changes to the Hartford City Charter taking effect on January 1, 2004, including extending mayoral terms to four years.

== 1935 ==
1935 Hartford mayoral election
- November 5, 1935
Candidate	John A. Pilgard	Joseph W. Beach
Party	Democratic	Republican
Popular vote	27,585	20,372
Percentage	56.4%	41.7%
Mayor before election
Joseph W. Beach
Republican
Elected mayor
John A. Pilgard
Democratic

=== General election result ===
1935 Hartford mayoral election results
Party	Candidate	Votes	%
Democratic	John A. Pilgard	27,585	56.4%
Republican	Joseph W. Beach (incumbent)	20,372	41.7%
Socialist	Abraham Perlstein	729	1.5%
Communist	Olaf R. Ellison	204	0.4%
Turnout		48,890	100%

Mayor-elect Pilgard died at St. Francis Hospital in Hartford (Saint Francis Hospital & Medical Center) on November 14, 1935. On December 3, 1935, by a 14-6 vote, the city council chose Thomas J. Spellacy to finish Pilgard's term in office.

== 1937 ==
1937 Hartford mayoral election
- November 2, 1937
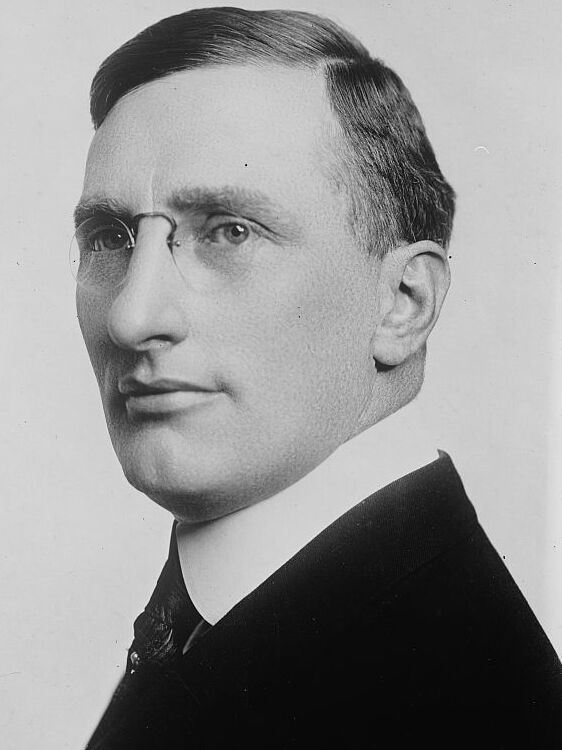

Candidate	Thomas J. Spellacy	Joseph W. Beach
Party	Democratic	Republican
Popular vote	31,736	16,347
Percentage	62.01%	31.94%
Mayor before election
Thomas J. Spellacy
Democratic
Elected mayor
Thomas J. Spellacy
Democratic

=== General election result ===
1937 Hartford mayoral election results
Party	Candidate	Votes	%
Democratic	Thomas J. Spellacy (incumbent)	31,736	62.01
Republican	Joseph W. Beach	16,347	31.94
Union	James L. McGuire	2,378	4.64
Socialist	Victor I. Harris	525	1.03
Communist	Sydney E. Wilson	192	0.38
Turnout		51,178	

== 1939 ==
1939 Hartford mayoral election
- November 7, 1939
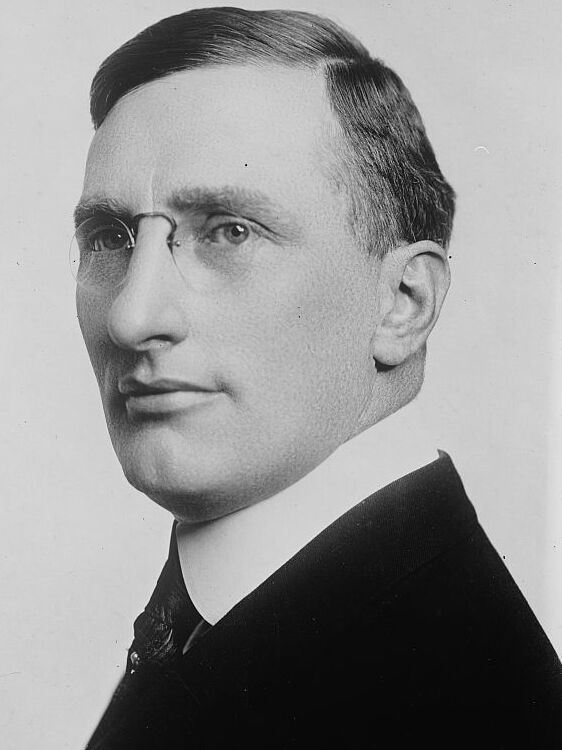

Candidate	Thomas J. Spellacy	Joseph B. Griffin
Party	Democratic	Republican
Popular vote	25,933	21,061
Percentage	52.44%	42.59%
- Precinct results Spellacy 40–50% 50–60% 60–70% Griffin 40–50% 50–60% 60–70%
Mayor before election
Thomas J. Spellacy
Democratic
Elected mayor
Thomas J. Spellacy
Democratic

=== General election result ===
1939 Hartford mayoral election results
Party	Candidate	Votes	%
Democratic	Thomas J. Spellacy (incumbent)	25,933	52.44
Republican	Joseph B. Griffin	21,061	42.59
Socialist	Bellani Trombley	1,385	2.80
Union	Elias Starquist	1,076	2.18
Turnout		49,455	

== 1941 ==
1941 Hartford mayoral election
- November 4, 1941
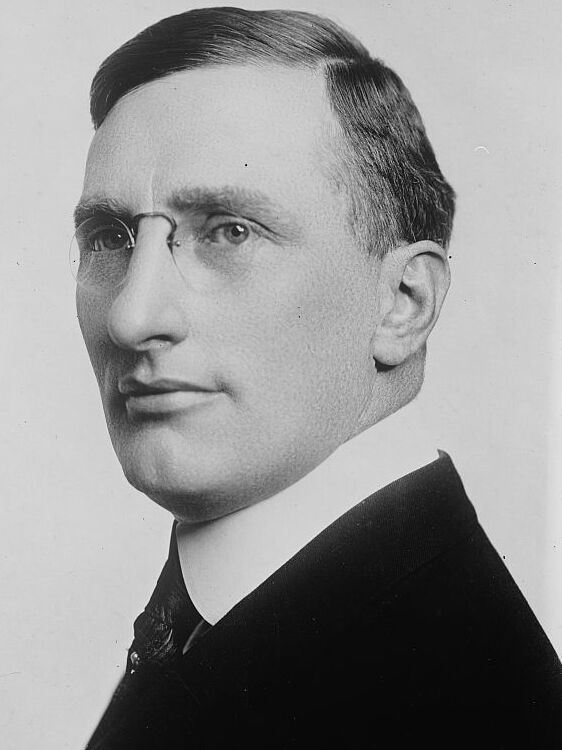

Candidate	Thomas J. Spellacy	Joseph B. Griffin
Party	Democratic	Republican
Popular vote	25,372	20,382
Percentage	55.45%	44.55%
- Precinct results Spellacy 50–60% 60–70% Griffin 50–60% 60–70%
Mayor before election
Thomas J. Spellacy
Democratic
Elected mayor
Thomas J. Spellacy
Democratic

=== General election result ===
1941 Hartford mayoral election results
Party	Candidate	Votes	%
Democratic	Thomas J. Spellacy (incumbent)	25,372	55.45
Republican	Joseph B. Griffin	20,382	44.55
Turnout		45,754	

Mayor Spellacy was also endorsed by the Socialist Party and Union Party tickets.

== 1943 ==
1943 Hartford mayoral election
- November 2, 1943

Candidate	William H. Mortensen	Dennis Paul O'Connor
Party	Republican	Democratic
Popular vote	25,533	23,165
Percentage	52.43%	47.57%
- Precinct results Mortensen 50–60% 60–70% 70–80% O'Connor 50–60% 60–70%
Mayor before election
Dennis Paul O'Connor
Democratic
Elected mayor
William H. Mortensen
Republican

=== General election result ===
1943 Hartford mayoral election results
Party	Candidate	Votes	%
Republican	William H. Mortensen	25,533	52.43
Democratic	Dennis Paul O'Connor (incumbent)	23,165	47.57
Turnout		48,698	

Mayor O'Connor was also endorsed by the Socialist Party ticket. He received 22,970 votes on the Democratic Party ballot line and 195 votes on the Socialist Party ballot line. In July 1943, O'Connor had replaced Mayor Thomas J. Spellacy, who had resigned.

== 1945 ==
1945 Hartford mayoral election
- November 6, 1945

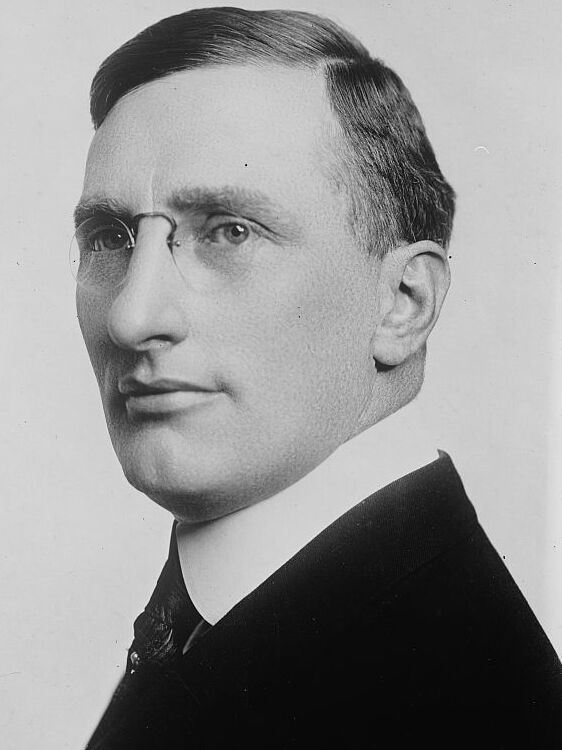
Candidate	Cornellus A. Moylan	Thomas J. Spellacy
Party	Republican	Democratic
Popular vote	28,946	19,751
Percentage	59.44%	40.59%
- Precinct results Moylan 50–60% 60–70% 70–80% Spellacy 50–60% 60–70%
Mayor before election
William H. Mortensen
Republican
Elected mayor
Cornellus A. Moylan
Republican

=== General election result ===
1945 Hartford mayoral election results
Party	Candidate	Votes	%
Republican	Cornellus A. Moylan	28,946	59.44
Democratic	Thomas J. Spellacy	19,751	40.59
Turnout		48,697	

Turnout was approximately 59% of the 82,700 eligible voters. Mayor Moylan died in office in late December 1946. By a 15-4 vote, the city council chose Edward N. Allen to finish Moylan's term in office.

== 1946 ==
1946 Hartford Charter referendum
- December 3, 1946
- Proposed Charter for the City of Hartford

Results
Choice	Votes	%
Yes	21,089	68.39%
No	9,748	31.61%
Total votes	30,837	100.00%
- Yes: 50–60% 60–70% 70–80% 80–90% No: 50–60% 60–70%

On December 3, 1946, voters approved of a new city charter which would elect a city council of nine members in a non-partisan election. The council would be responsible for selecting a city manager, who would be tasked with most of the city's administrative functions. The council member candidate with the highest number of votes was elected to the office of mayor, which became largely ceremonial.

=== Background ===
In early 1946, a group of citizens had come together with the support of former mayor William H. Mortensen in an attempt to reform the city government. It would later become known as the Citizens Charter Committee (CCC).

Hartford's political establishment, mostly Democrats, were opposed to the new proposed Charter, seeing it as a way of taking away their political control over Hartford's government. The leading member against the Charter was political boss John M. Bailey, while the main proponent was former state Representative Abraham Ribicoff.

== 1947 ==
=== General election result ===
On November 4, 1947, the voters elected a nine-member city council in a non-partisan election. Cyril Coleman, the council member candidate with the most votes assumed the office of mayor.

== 1979 ==
1979 Hartford mayoral election
- November 6, 1979
Candidate	George A. Athanson	William E. Glynn	Michael T. McGarry
Party	Democratic	Independent Democratic	Republican
Popular vote	12,291	6,573	2,235
Percentage	57.01%	30.49%	10.37%
Mayor before election
George A. Athanson
Democratic
Elected mayor
George A. Athanson
Democratic

The 1979 Hartford mayoral election was held on November 6, 1979. It saw George A. Athanson win reelection to a fifth term.

=== Democratic primary ===
The Democratic primary was held on September 11.

==== Candidates ====
- George A. Athanson, incumbent mayor
- Nicholas R. Carbone, deputy mayor

==== Results ====
The city's Democratic committee endorsed Carbone for election ahead of the primary.

Anthanson won by a large margin. The slate for the Democratic nominations for city council he had backed, which was regarded as the "weaker" slate by political observers, also won election.

Turnout was over 46%.

1979 Hartford mayoral Democratic primary results
Party	Candidate	Votes	%
Democratic	George A. Athanson (incumbent)	10,893	60.95
Democratic	Nicholas R. Carbone	6,980	39.05
Turnout		17,873	

=== Republican nomination ===
Hartford's Republican Town Chairman Joseph P. Mozzicato attempted to make sure no Republican nominee would run for the mayoralty, seeing the mayoral election as a losing race, and preferring to spend the party's money focussing on the City Council election. Registered Republican voters comprised only 7,000 of Hartford's roughly 140,000 residents. The Republican Party, however, ultimately nominated Michael T. McGarry. McGarry had previously been an unsuccessful Republican nominee for state representative in both 1970 and 1978.

=== Independent candidates ===
- William E. Glynn (independent Democrat), former mayor (1961–1965)
- Joseph Mazzafera (Independent)

==== Withdrawn ====
- Donna C. McDonald (U.S. Labor Party)

=== General election result ===
1979 Hartford mayoral election results
Party	Candidate	Votes	%
Democratic	George A. Athanson (incumbent)	12,291	57.01
Independent Democratic	William E. Glynn	6,573	30.49
Republican	Michael T. McGarry	2,235	10.37
Independent	Joseph Mazzafera	459	2.13
Turnout		21,558	

== 1981 ==
1981 Hartford mayoral election
- November 3, 1981
Candidate	Thirman Milner	Robert F. Ludgin	Michael T. McGarry
Party	Democratic	Independent Democratic	Republican
Popular vote	14,854	6,951	4,076
Percentage	57.39%	26.86%	15.75%
Mayor before election
George A. Athanson
Democratic
Elected mayor
Thirman Milner
Democratic

The 1981 Hartford mayoral election was held on November 3, 1981. It saw Thirman Milner win election. The election made Milner the first popularly elected black mayor of a city in New England. Black people made up one-third of the city's population at the time. Milner defeated five-term incumbent mayor George A. Athanson in the Democratic primary.

=== Democratic primary ===
==== Candidates ====
- George A. Athanson, incumbent mayor
- Robert F. Ludgin, deputy mayor and city councilor
- Thirman Milner, Connecticut state representative
- Johanna C. Murphy, community activist

==== Initial primary (September 8) ====
Incumbent mayor George A. Athanson won the initial primary held on September 8, defeating runner-up Milner by a mere 94 votes. This result would ultimately be nullified in court.

Heading into the election, Athanson was regarded to be a well-liked figure in the city.

Milner's strong performance regarded as a surprise, outperforming polls and many expectations. One Hartford Courant poll ahead of the primary had shown Athanson leading Milner by a much greater 14-point margin (35% to 21%).

The result had largely corresponded to racial lines, with Milner performing well in the predominantly black North End (where he lived), and with Athanson and Ludgin splitting the predominantly white South End. Murphy had performed her best in the liberal West End of the city (where she lived). Athanson performed well in the South End of the city. However, he underperformed on the North End, and lost the West End to Murray. Milner performed strongly in the North End of the city, and had some strong performances in some parts of the West End. In the Blue Hills portion of Hartford, Milner routed Athanson.

Ludgin, elected in 1977 to The Hartford City Council as an outsider, had made many enemies and put-off many voters through his aggressive leadership style in his two years in office. Murray, a community activist, was a first-time candidate for elected office.

Unlike in 1979, the city's Democratic committee endorsed Athanson for reelection ahead of the primary.

1981 Hartford September 8, 1981 mayoral Democratic primary results –nullified
Party	Candidate	Votes	%
Democratic	George A. Athanson (incumbent)	5,229	32.94
Democratic	Thirman L. Milner	5,135	32.35
Democratic	Robert F. Ludgin	3,167	19.95
Democratic	Johanna C. Murphy	2,343	14.76
Turnout		15,874	40

==== Rerun (October 13) ====
Voting irregularities in the September 8 Democratic primary led Connecticut Superior Court judge Douglass B. Wright to order a rerun of the Democratic primary to take place on October 13, after Milner brought a challenge to the court and city officials and Athanson agreed in court to allow a rerun.

In the rerun of the primary, Milner defeated incumbent mayor George A. Athanson, in large part, due to a very strong showing in the city's North End.

1981 Hartford October 13, 1981 mayoral Democratic primary rerun results
Party	Candidate	Votes	%
Democratic	Thirman L. Milner	9,267	48.72
Democratic	George A. Athanson (incumbent)	6,521	34.28
Democratic	Robert F. Ludgin	1,664	8.75
Democratic	Johanna C. Murphy	1,570	8.25
Turnout		19,022	

=== Republican primary ===
Michael T. McGarry won the Republican primary. He defeated Donald B. LaCroix. LaCroix had been endorsed by the city's Republican Party organization ahead of the primary. LaCroix had a record of running losing campaigns for elected office. McGarry had been the more known figure of the two.

1981 Hartford mayoral Republican primary results
Party	Candidate	Votes	%
Republican	Michael T. McGarry	892	65.98
Republican	Donald B. LaCroix	460	34.02
Turnout		1,352	

=== Independent candidates ===
- Robert F. Ludgin (Democrat)

=== General election ===
Milner continued to receive strong support from the city's North Side, winning 90% of the roughly 9,500 votes cast there in the general election.

1981 Hartford mayoral election results
Party	Candidate	Votes	%
Democratic	Thirman L. Milner	14,854	57.39
Independent Democratic	Robert F. Ludgin	6,951	26.86
Republican	Michael T. McGarry	4,076	15.75
Turnout		25,881	

== 1991 ==
1991 Hartford mayoral election
- November 5, 1991
Candidate	Carrie Saxon Perry
Party	Democratic
Popular vote	7,987
Percentage	100%
Mayor before election
Carrie Saxon Perry
Democratic
Elected mayor
Carrie Saxon Perry
Democratic

The 1991 Hartford mayoral election was held on November 5, 1991. Incumbent Carrie Saxon Perry was reelected to a third consecutive term, defeating a challenger in the Democratic primary, and running unopposed in the general election.

=== Democratic primary ===
The Democratic primary was held on September 10.

Ahead of the Democratic primary, the city's Democratic Party organization endorsed Robert J. Jackson over the incumbent mayor Carrie Saxon Perry. Perry had gone against the city's Democratic machine and ran her own slate of candidates for City Council in the coinciding city council primaries, which ultimately prevailed over all of the incumbents they were challenging.

1991 Hartford mayoral Democratic primary results
Party	Candidate	Votes	%
Democratic	Carrie Saxon Perry (incumbent)	7,228	59.57
Democratic	Robert J. Jackson	4,905	40.43
Turnout		12,133	30

=== Republican nomination ===
The Republican Party nominated no candidate.

=== General election ===
1991 Hartford mayoral election results
Party	Candidate	Votes	%
Democratic	Carrie Saxon Perry (incumbent)	7,987	100
Turnout		7,987	100

== 1993 ==
1993 Hartford mayoral election
- November 2, 1993
Candidate	Michael P. Peters	Carrie Saxon Perry
Party	Independent Democratic	Democratic
Popular vote	11,768	7,022
Percentage	61.24%	36.54%
Mayor before election
Carrie Saxon Perry
Democratic
Elected mayor
Michael P. Peters
Democratic

The 1993 Hartford mayoral election was held on November 2, 1993. Incumbent Carrie Saxon Perry lost reelection to Michael P. Peters.

=== Democratic primary ===
==== Candidates ====
- Yolanda Castillo, Hartford City Council majority leader
- Henrietta S. Milward, deputy mayor
- Carrie Saxon Perry, incumbent mayor
- Michael P. Peters, firefighter

==== Results ====
Incumbent mayor Carrie Saxon Perry won renomination, carrying a plurality, with 35% of the vote, defeating three opponents. She carried 10 of the 27 precincts for the election. Her margin of victory over runner-up Peters was roughly 700 votes. Turnout comprised roughly 35% of the city's registered Democrats.

Peters was a firefighter who had previously considered an independent run for mayor in the 1991 mayoral general election, but was dissuaded that year after Perry won that year's Democratic primary by a significant margin.

=== Republican nomination ===
The Republican Party nominated no candidate.

=== Petitioning candidates ===
- Kennth A. Mink (Independent)
- Michael P. Peters, firefighter (Democrat)
- Nora Wyatt Jr., reverend (Independent)

=== General election ===
Facing the strong prospect of a loss to Peters, a white candidate, the black Perry brought in several notable black national political figures, such as Carol Moseley Braun and Jesse Jackson, to endorse her. Perry's supporters, at a rally featuring Jackson, distributed flyers which implied that Peters would undo the last decade of progress for the city's black populace.

Perry also received endorsements from mayors of other Connecticut municipalities, such as Bridgeport's Joseph Ganim, New Haven's John C. Daniels and West Haven's Richard Borer. She also received the endorsement of John DeStefano Jr., the Democratic nominee in the coinciding New Haven mayoral election.

While Perry and her supporters adopted the tactic of attacking Peters, Peters largely went without even mentioning Perry, instead focusing on promoting his proposals for the city.

Peters unseated Perry, becoming the first independent to become mayor of Hartford since at least 1953.

Peters benefited from strong support and turnout among the city's white electorate. Turnout in the city's white South End wards averaged 60%, while the citywide turnout only averaged 45%. In the three most predominantly white precincts on the city's South End, Peters won 90% of the vote. Peters also received more support in precincts located in the predominantly black North End than most white candidates had managed to receive there in election over the previous decade, receiving roughly 20% of the vote in those precincts.

Peters carried 19 districts. Perry carried 8 voting districts, most of them being in the North Side.

1993 Hartford mayoral election results
Party	Candidate	Votes	%
Independent Democratic	Michael P. Peters	11,768	61.24
Democratic	Carrie Saxon Perry (incumbent)	7,022	36.54
Independent	Kenneth A. Mink	214	1.11
Independent	Nora Wyatt Jr.	212	1.10
Turnout		19,216	

== 1995 ==
1995 Hartford mayoral election
- November 7, 1995
Candidate	Michael P. Peters	Elizabeth Horton Sheff
Party	Democratic	Independent Democratic
Popular vote	10,170	1,788
Percentage	85.05%	14.95%
Mayor before election
Michael P. Peters
Democratic
Elected mayor
Michael P. Peters
Democratic

The 1995 Hartford mayoral election was held on November 7, 1995. Incumbent Michael P. Peters was reelected.

=== Democratic primary ===
Incumbent mayor Michael P. Peters defeated city councilwoman Elizabeth Horton Sheff in the Democratic primary.

1995 Hartford mayoral Democratic primary results
Party	Candidate	Votes	%
Democratic	Michael P. Peters (incumbent)	7,756	79.81
Democratic	Elizabeth Horton Sheff	1,962	20.19
Turnout		9,718	

=== Republican nomination ===
The Republican Party nominated no candidate.

=== Petitioning candidates ===
- Elizabeth Horton Sheff (Democrat), city councilwoman

=== General election ===
1995 Hartford mayoral election results
Party	Candidate	Votes	%
Democratic	Michael P. Peters (incumbent)	10,170	85.05
Independent Democratic	Elizabeth Horton Sheff	1,788	14.95
Turnout		11,958	

== 1997 ==
1997 Hartford mayoral election
- November 4, 1997
Candidate	Michael P. Peters	Kenneth Mink
Party	Democratic	Independent Democratic
Popular vote	8,793	964
Percentage	90.12%	9.88
Mayor before election
Michael P. Peters
Democratic
Elected mayor
Michael P. Peters
Democratic

The 1997 Hartford mayoral election was held on November 4, 1997. Incumbent Michael P. Peters won reelection to a third term.

=== Democratic nomination ===
For only the second time in two decades, Hartford did not have a competitive Democratic primary. Activist Kenneth Mink, who had been an announced challenger of incumbent Mike Peters, failed to file on time the proper forms to run against him in the Democratic primary. The last two times that there had been no competitive primary for the Democratic mayoral nomination were 1989 and 1977.

=== Republican nomination ===
The Republican Party nominated no candidate.

=== Other parties ===
The Pro Hartford Party opted against running a candidate.

=== Petitioning candidates ===
- Kenneth Mink, activist and 1993 mayoral candidate

=== General election ===
Michael P. Peters received the endorsement of the Hartford Courant.

Michael P. Peters won every precinct in the city.

1997 Hartford mayoral election results
Party	Candidate	Votes	%
Democratic	Michael P. Peters (incumbent)	8,793	90.12
Independent Democratic	Kenneth A. Mink	964	9.88
Turnout		9,757	

== 1999 ==
1999 Hartford mayoral election
- November 1, 1999
- Turnout: 18.54%
Candidate	Michael P. Peters
Party	Democratic
Popular vote	7,943
Percentage	99.94%
Mayor before election
Michael P. Peters
Democratic
Elected mayor
Michael P. Peters
Democratic

The 1999 Hartford mayoral election was held on November 1, 1999. Democrat Michael P. Peters won reelection to a fourth term.

=== Democratic primary ===
Incumbent Michael P. Peters defeated Juan Morales in the Democratic primary. Morales was a tax and banking consultant who worked with insurance companies. Morales was a relative political newcomer, whose previous political experience included running unsuccessfully for Hartford City Council in 1995.

=== Republican nomination ===
The Republican Party nominated no candidate.

=== Write-ins ===
- W. Michael Downes, 1995 mayoral candidate

=== General election results ===
1999 Hartford mayoral election results
Party	Candidate	Votes	%
Democratic	Michael P. Peters (incumbent)	7,943	99.94
Write-in	W. Michael Downes	5	0.06
Turnout		7,948	18.54

== 2001 ==
2001 Hartford mayoral election
- November 6, 2001
- Turnout: 27.38%
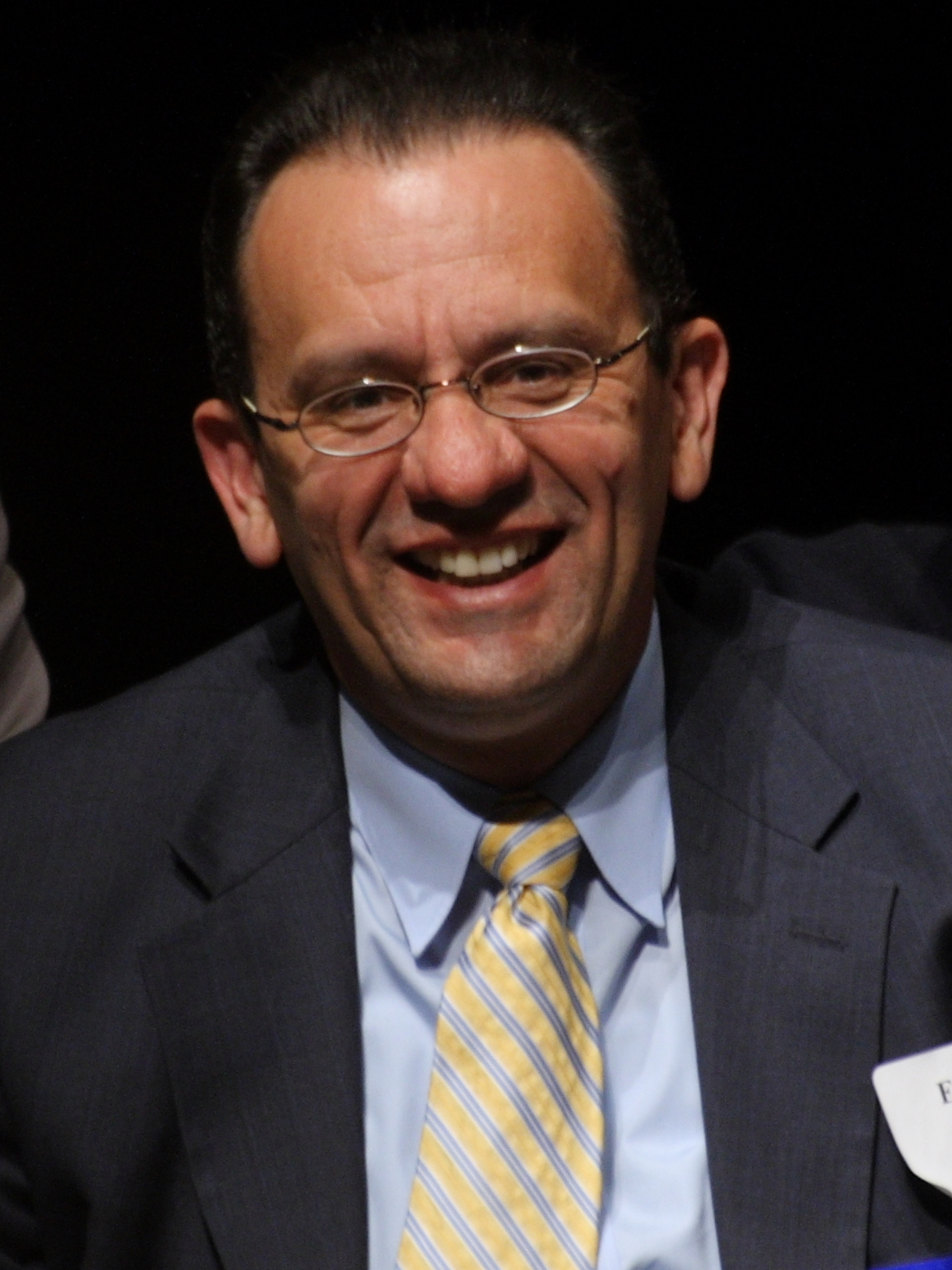

Candidate	Eddie Perez	Robert F. Ludgin
Party	Democratic	Independent Democratic
Popular vote	8,609	1,863
Percentage	74.44%	16.11%
Mayor before election
Michael P. Peters
Democratic
Elected mayor
Eddie Perez
Democratic

The 2001 Hartford mayoral election was held on November 6, 2001. Democrat Eddie Perez won election. Perez became the city's first hispanic mayor. Hartford was, as of the 2000 United States census, 40.52% Hispanic.

Incumbent mayor Michael P. Peters did not seek reelection.

=== Democratic primary ===
The Democratic primary took place on September 11, 2001, the same day as the September 11 attacks.

Ahead of the primary, Eddie A. Perez received the endorsement of the city's Democratic Party organization.

2001 Hartford mayoral Democratic primary results
Party	Candidate	Votes	%
Democratic	Eddie A. Perez	4,922	70.92
Democratic	Robert F. Ludgin	1,898	27.35
Turnout		6,940	23.23

=== Republican nomination ===
The Republican Party nominated no candidate.

=== Libertarian nomination ===
The Libertarian Party nominated Richard Lion.

=== Petitioning candidates ===
- W. Michael Downes, 1995 and 1999 mayoral candidate
- Robert F. Ludgin (Democrat)
- Kenneth A. Mink, activist; 1993 and 1997 mayoral candidate
- Nora Wyatt, Jr

=== General election results ===
2001 Hartford mayoral election results
Party	Candidate	Votes	%
Democratic	Eddie A. Perez	8,609	74.44
Independent Democrat	Robert F. Ludgin	1,863	16.11
Independent	Nora Wyatt, Jr.	487	4.21
Libertarian	Richard Lion	260	2.25
Independent	Kenneth A. Mink	251	2.17
Independent	W. Michael Downes	95	0.82
Turnout		11,565	27.38

== 2003 ==
2003 Hartford mayoral election
- November 4, 2003
- Turnout: 22.70%
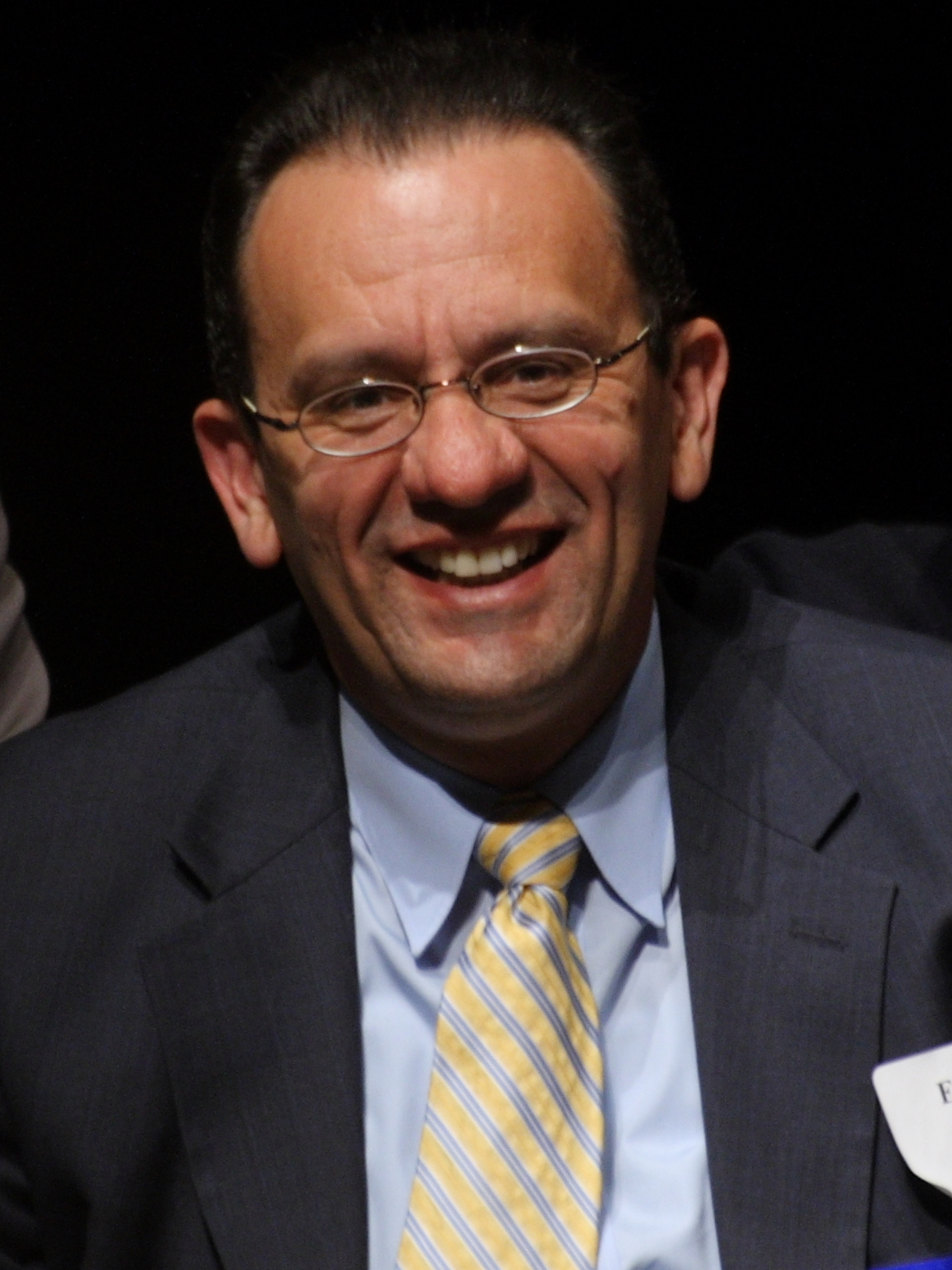

Candidate	Eddie Perez	Michael T. McGarry	Richard Lion
Party	Democratic	Republican	Libertarian
Popular vote	7,590	1,876	564
Percentage	75.67%	18.70%	5.62%
Mayor before election
Eddie Perez
Democratic
Elected mayor
Eddie Perez
Democratic

The 2003 Hartford mayoral election was held on November 4, 2003. Incumbent Democrat Eddie Perez won reelection.

The election was to a two-year term. However, in 2004, Hartford residents extended their mayoral terms, which extended Perez's second term through 2008.

=== Democratic primary ===
Perez won renomination unopposed, in a Democratic Party primary in which 6,267 votes were cast (21% of the city's registered Democrats).

=== Republican nomination ===
The Republican Party nominated Michael T. McGarry, who had previously been the party's mayoral nominee in 1979. He had more recently been an unsuccessful Republican nominee for Hartford City Council in 2001.

=== Libertarian nomination ===
The Libertarian Party nominated Richard Lion, who was also the party's nominee in the 2001 mayoral election.

=== Petitioning candidates ===
==== Withdrawn ====
- Thirman L. Milner, former mayor (1981–1987)

=== General election results ===
2003 Hartford mayoral election results
Party	Candidate	Votes	%
Democratic	Eddie A. Perez (incumbent)	7,590	75.67
Republican	Michael T. McGarry	1,876	18.70
Libertarian	Richard Lion	564	5.62
Turnout		10,030	22.70

== 2007 ==
2007 Hartford mayoral election
- November 6, 2007
- Turnout: 31.76%
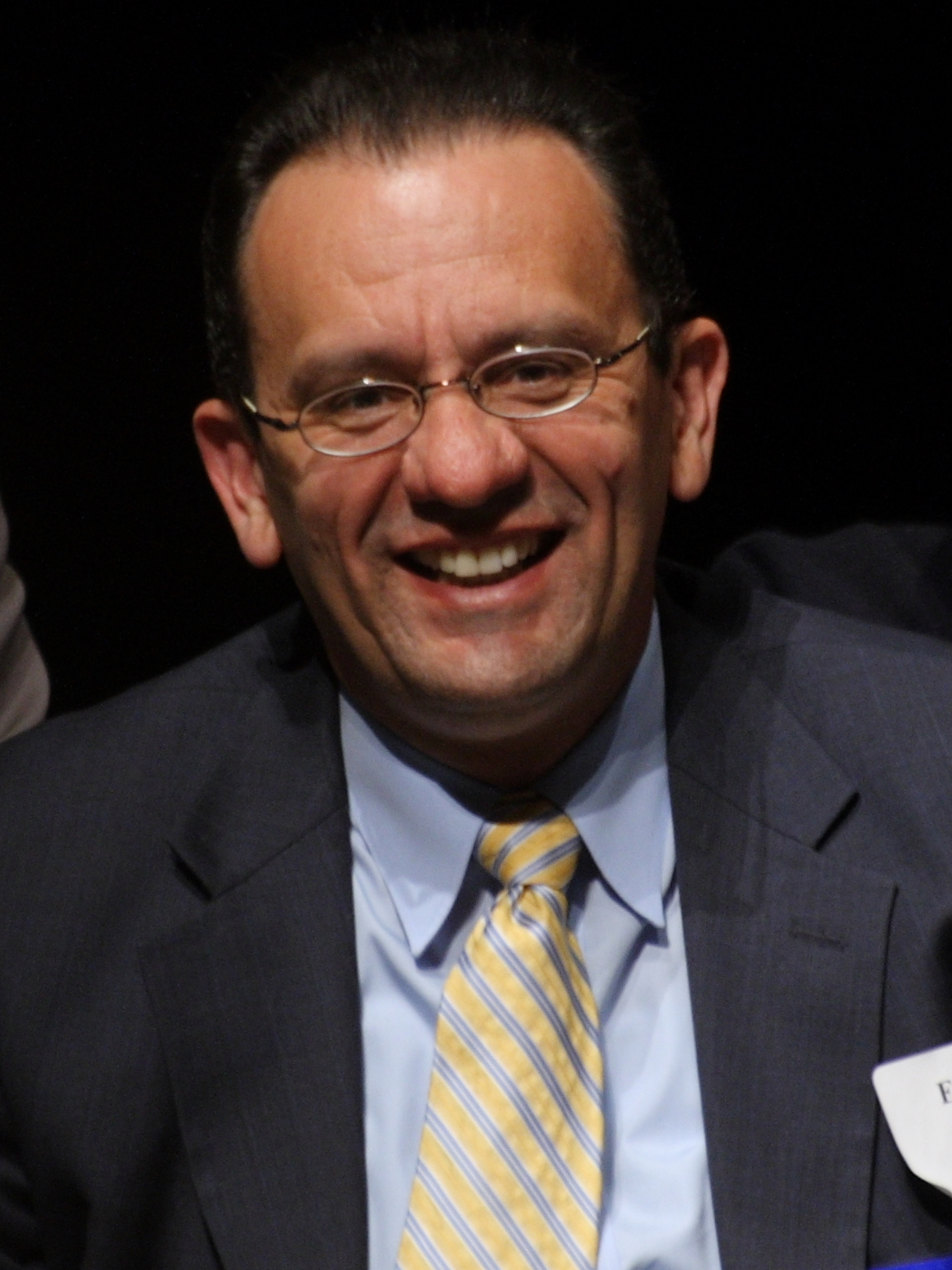

Candidate	Eddie Perez	I. Charles Matthews
Party	Democratic	Independent Democrat
Popular vote	6,453	4,556
Percentage	48.84%	34.47%
Candidate	Minnie Gonzalez	James Stanley McCauley
Party	Independent Democrat	Republican
Popular vote	996	721
Percentage	6.56%	5.45%
Mayor before election
Eddie Perez
Democratic
Elected mayor
Eddie Perez
Democratic

The 2007 Hartford mayoral election was held on November 6, 2007. Incumbent Democrat Eddie Perez won reelection to a third term.

=== Democratic primary ===
The Democratic primary was held on September 11.

==== Candidates ====
- Frank Barrows, former Connecticut state senator
- Art Feltman, Connecticut state representative
- I. Charles Matthews, lawyer, former Hartford City Council leader, former deputy mayor
- Eddie Perez, incumbent mayor

Disqualified from ballot

- Minnie Gonzalez, Connecticut state representative

==== Campaign ====
A large focus of the primary campaign was how Perez had become so dominant in the city's politics.

One of the concerns of the primary campaign was that Perez was facing a criminal investigation relating to the remodeling of his home by a city contractor and deals involving city parking lots. Perez apologized for the home-improvement arrangement, and placed one of the parking lot deals back out to bid. In August, criminal investigators raided Perez's house.

==== Results ====
Turnout in the Democratic primary was approximately 25% of the city's registered Democrats.

Perez performed well in the city's South End and West End, but lost a number of North End precincts.

2007 Hartford mayoral Democratic primary results
Party	Candidate	Votes	%
Democratic	Eddie Perez (incumbent)	3,750	48.98
Democratic	I. Charles Matthews	2,231	29.14
Democratic	Art Feltman	988	12.91
Democratic	Frank Barrows	687	8.97
Turnout		7,656	25

Results by district
District	Barrows		Feltman		Matthews		Perez		Total
District	Votes	%	Votes	%	Votes	%	Votes	%	Total
1	58	14.72%	36	9.14%	186	47.21%	114	28.93%	394
2	19	12.26%	19	12.26%	58	37.42%	59	38.07%	155
3	21	4.13%	129	25.34%	201	39.49%	158	31.04%	509
4	20	10.10%	47	23.74%	77	38.89%	54	27.27%	198
5	48	10.26%	56	11.97%	150	32.05%	214	45.73%	468
6	79	18.72%	10	2.37%	172	40.76%	161	38.15%	422
7	81	13.82%	48	8.19%	227	38.74%	230	39.25%	586
8	30	9.59%	41	13.10%	37	11.82%	205	65.50%	313
9	14	4.61%	27	8.88%	42	13.82%	221	72.70%	304
10	17	3.96%	46	10.72%	69	16.08%	297	69.23%	429
11	24	5.31%	103	22.79%	96	21.24%	229	50.66%	452
12	12	2.61%	105	22.88%	72	15.69%	270	58.82%	459
13	10	2.73%	78	21.31%	103	28.14%	175	47.81%	366
14	27	6.05%	109	24.44%	92	20.63%	218	48.88%	446
15	9	5.66%	19	11.95%	32	20.13%	99	62.26%	159
16	12	5.00%	18	7.50%	52	21.67%	158	65.83%	240
17	10	4.08%	15	6.12%	37	15.10%	183	74.69%	245
18	7	2.52%	17	6.12%	50	17.99%	204	73.38%	278
19	3	2.14%	37	26.43%	54	38.57%	46	32.86%	140
20	24	12.06%	10	5.03%	71	35.68%	94	47.24%	199
21	18	9.38%	2	1.04%	31	16.15%	141	73.44%	192
22	66	20.95%	5	1.59%	130	41.27%	114	36.19%	315
23	78	20.16%	11	2.84%	192	49.61%	106	27.39%	387

=== Republican nomination ===
The Republican Party nominated James Stanley McCauley. McCauley was a minister who had a public-access television show.

=== Independent candidates ===
- Rual DeJesus (Democrat)
- Minnie Gonzalez (Democrat), Connecticut state representative
- I. Charles Matthews (Democrat), lawyer, former Hartford City Council leader, former deputy mayor
- Thirman L. Milner (Independent), former mayor (1981–1987)

==== Withdrawn ====
- Art Feltman (Democrat), Connecticut state representative
- Patrice Smith (Democrat), reverend and youth advocate

=== General election campaign ===
Winning the Democratic primary in Hartford is generally considered tantamount to election. However, fourteen years earlier, independent Michael P. Peters, who served as mayor from 1993 through 2001, had first won election as a petitioning candidate in the general election, after having failed to win the Democratic primary over then-incumbent Carrie Saxon Perry. Registered Democrats in Hartford numbered 30,039, unaffiliated voters numbered 10,454, and Republicans numbered 1,932.

Despite his controversies, Perez received endorsements from Connecticut attorney general Richard Blumenthal, Democratic state chairwoman Nancy DiNardo, Connecticut state comptroller Nancy Wyman.

Former mayor Michael P. Peters endorsed the candidacy of I. Charles Matthews.

Since launching his candidacy in January 2007, Perez had vastly out fundraised and outspent his opponents, raising $593,000 by the end of October. He spent most of the money raised, with only $54,500 of it remaining unspent by the end of October. He spent on consultants, mailers, and in excess of $150,000 in television advertisements. I. Charles Matthews had raised $131,00 by the end of October, though $88,000 of it was self-funding. Minnie Gonzalez raised $56,000 by the end of October. By the end of October, Rual De Jesus had raised $8,000, Thurman Milner had raised $7,000, and J. Stan McCauley had raised $3,000.

=== General election results ===
2007 Hartford mayoral election results
Party	Candidate	Votes	%
Democratic	Eddie A. Perez (incumbent)	6,453	48.36
Independent Democrat	I. Charles Matthews	4,556	34.14
Independent Democrat	Minnie Gonzalez	996	7.46
Republican	James Stanley McCauley	721	5.40
Independent	Thirman L. Milner	463	3.47
Independent Democrat	Rual DeJesus	155	1.16
Turnout		13,344	31.76

== 2011 ==
2011 Hartford mayoral election
- November 8, 2011
- Turnout: 12.51%
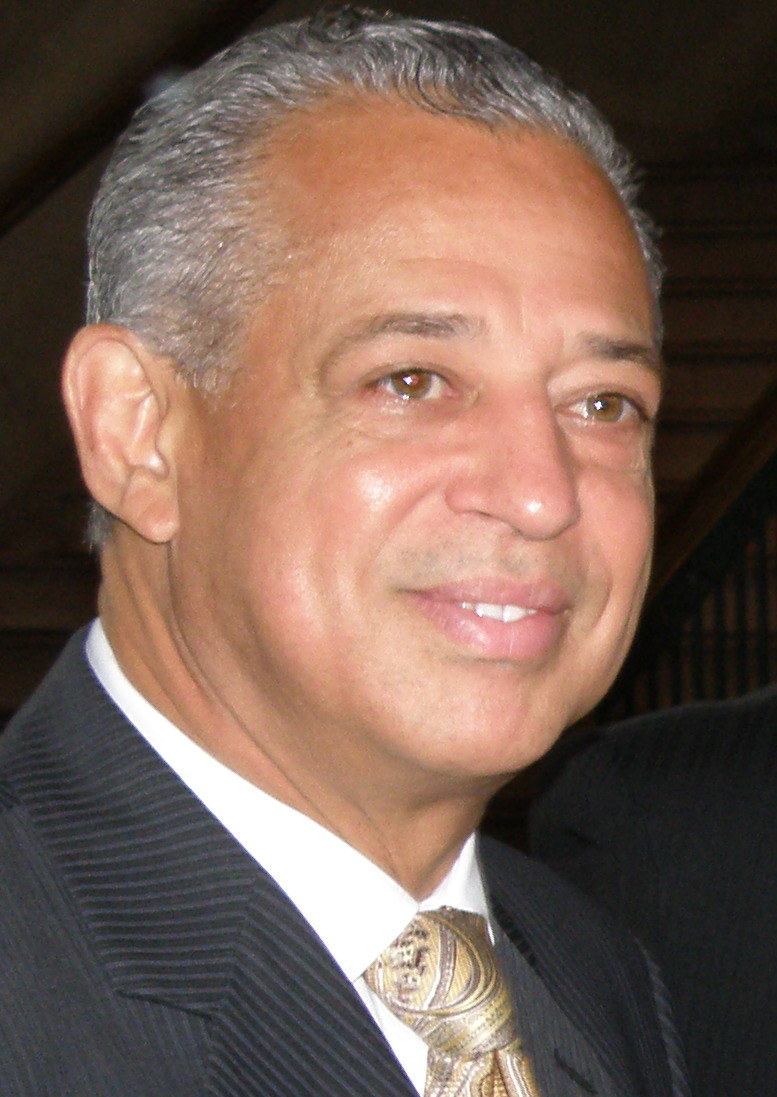

Candidate	Pedro Segarra	James Stanley McCauley	Edwin Vargas, Jr.
Party	Democratic	Independent	Independent
Popular vote	5,736	641	489
Percentage	82.18%	9.18%	7.01%
Mayor before election
Pedro Segarra
Democratic
Elected mayor
Pedro Segarra
Democratic

The 2011 Hartford mayoral election was held on November 8, 2011. The election saw incumbent Democrat Pedro Segarra win a first full term. He became the first openly-gay individual elected Mayor of Hartford, making Hartford the second U.S. state capital to elect an openly gay mayor (Providence, Rhode Island was the first when they elected David Cicilline). Segarra also became the second hispanic individual to be elected mayor of Hartford, after Perez. As of the 2010 United States census, 43.43% of Hartford's populace was hispanic, which was the largest percentage of any city in the northeastern United States.

Segarra had become mayor in 2010, after mayor Eddie A. Perez resigned after being convicted of corruption.

=== Democratic primary ===
Incumbent Democrat Pedro Segarra won renomination.

2011 Hartford mayoral Democratic primary results
Party	Candidate	Votes	%
Democratic	Pedro Segarra (incumbent)	4,246	71.35%
Democratic	Edwin Vargas, Jr.	1,517	25.49%
Turnout		5,951	17.8%

=== Republican nomination ===
The Republican Party did not nominate a candidate, and instead cross-endorsed incumbent Democrat Pedro Segarra.

=== Petitioning candidates ===
- James Stanley McCauley, 2007 mayoral candidate
- Patrice Smith
- Edwin Vargas, Jr.

=== General election ===
2011 Hartford mayoral election results
Party	Candidate	Votes	%
Democratic	Pedro Segarra (incumbent)	5,736	82.18
Independent	James Stanley McCauley	641	9.18
Independent	Edwin Vargas, Jr.	489	7.01
Independent	Patrice Smith	114	1.63
Turnout		6,980	12.51

== 2015 ==
2015 Hartford mayoral election
- November 3, 2015
- Turnout: 17.31%
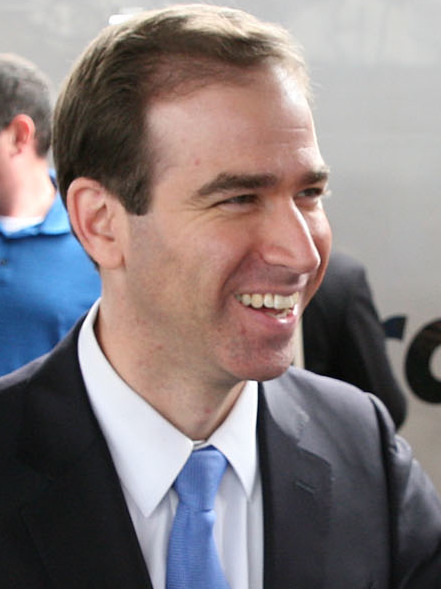

Candidate	Luke Bronin	Joel Cruz Jr.	Theodore T. Cannon
Party	Democratic	Independent	Republican
Popular vote	7,550	1,815	480
Percentage	75.64%	18.18%	4.8%
Mayor before election
Pedro Segarra
Democratic
Elected mayor
Luke Bronin
Democratic

The 2015 Hartford mayoral election was held on November 3, 2015. The election was won by Democrat Luke Bronin. Bronin defeated incumbent Pedro Segarra in the Democratic primary.

=== Democratic primary ===
The Democratic primary was held on September 15.

Ahead of the primary, held on Luke Bronin had won the endorsement of the Democratic primary. He defeated incumbent mayor Pedro Segarra in the primary.

Bronin outspent Segarra by a margin of 3 to 1. Bronin had raised $800,000 in his primary campaign.

Turnout in the Democratic primary was approximately 26%.

2015 Hartford mayoral Democratic primary results
Party	Candidate	Votes	%
Democratic	Luke Bronin	5,110	54.81%
Democratic	Pedro Segarra (incumbent)	4,213	45.19%
Turnout		9,323	26%

=== Republican nomination ===
Theodore T. Cannon won the Republican nomination.

=== Petitioning candidates ===
- Joel Cruz, Jr. (independent), city councilman
- Patrice Smith

=== General election ===
Hartford is a highly Democratic city; therefore, Bronin was anticipated to win the general election.

2015 Hartford mayoral election results
Party	Candidate	Votes	%
Democratic	Luke Bronin	7,550	75.64%
Independent	Joel Cruz, Jr.	1,815	18.18%
Republican	Theodore T. Cannon	480	4.80%
Independent	Patrice Smith	111	1.11%
Write-in	W. Michael Downes	26	0.26%
Turnout		9,982	17.31

== 2019 ==
2019 Hartford mayoral election
- November 5, 2019
- Turnout: 14.74%
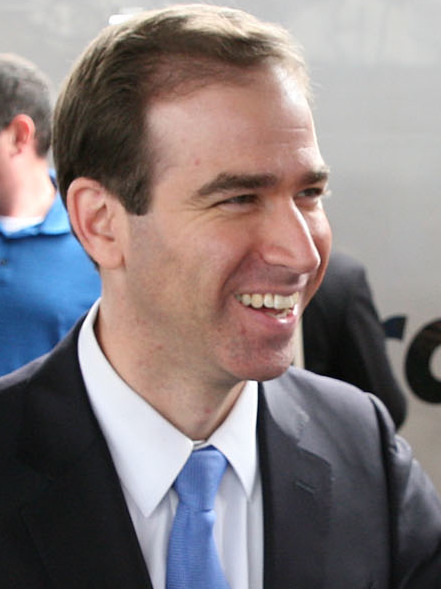

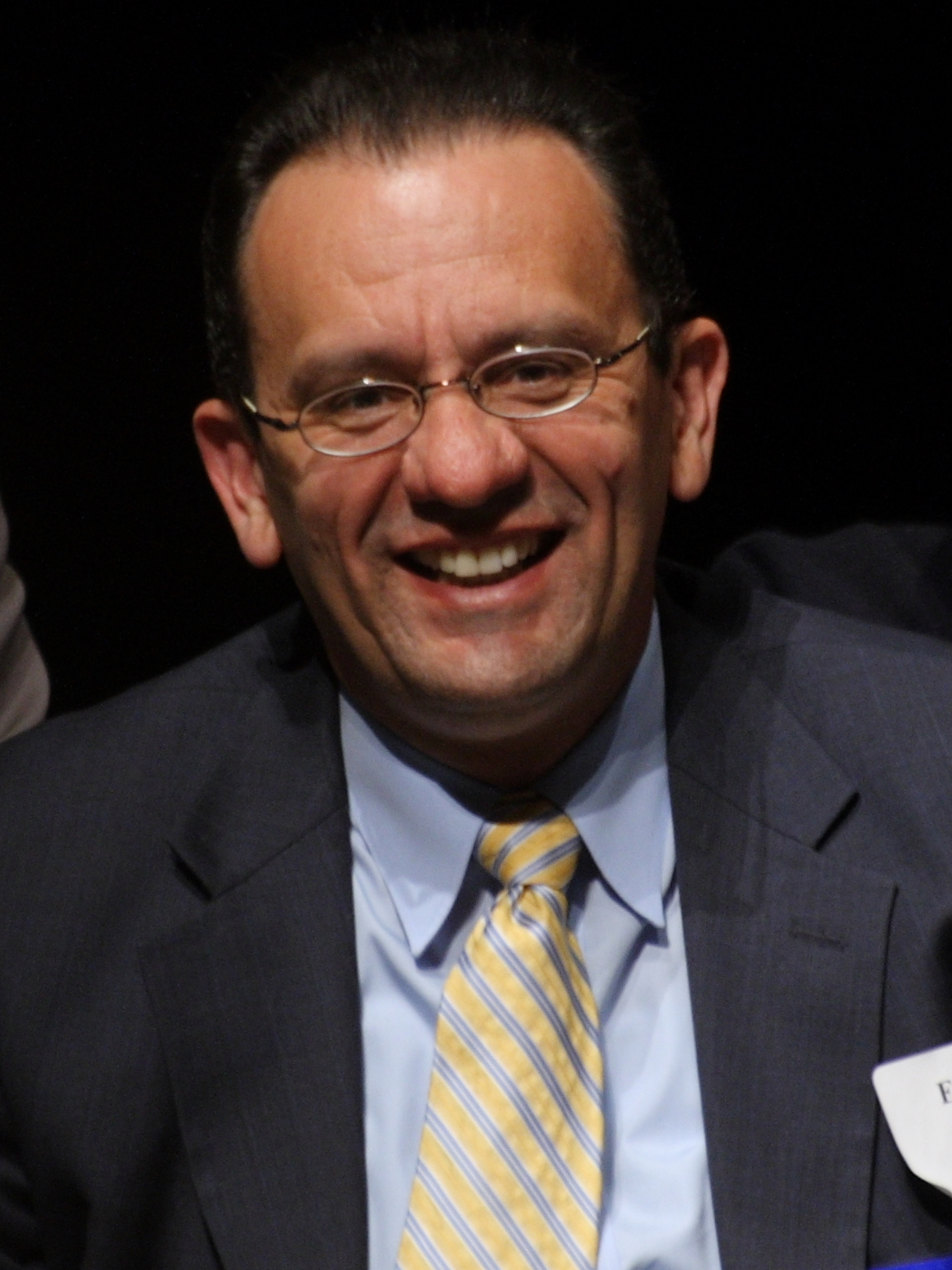

Candidate	Luke Bronin	Eddie Perez	James Stanley McCauley
Party	Democratic	Independent Democrat	Republican
Popular vote	7,638	1,221	846
Percentage	76.51%	12.23%	8.47%
Mayor before election
Luke Bronin
Democratic
Elected mayor
Luke Bronin
Democratic

The 2019 Hartford mayoral election was held on November 5, 2019. Incumbent Democrat Luke Bronin won reelection.

=== Democratic primary ===
The Democratic primary was held on September 10. The race had been considered competitive. Incumbent mayor Luke Bronin defeated former mayor Eddie Perez and state representative Brandon McGee in the Democratic primary.

Turnout in the Democratic primary was approximately 22%.

Democratic primary results by voting district. Bronin: 80-90% 70-80% 60-70% 50-60% 40-50% Tie: Tie Perez: <50% 50–60%

2019 Hartford mayoral Democratic primary results
Party	Candidate	Votes	%
Democratic	Luke Bronin (incumbent)	5,386	59.08%
Democratic	Eddie Perez	2,461	26.99%
Democratic	Brandon McGee	1,270	13.93%
Turnout		9,117	

Results by district
District	Bronin		McGee		Perez		Total
District	Votes	%	Votes	%	Votes	%	Total
1	26	63.89%	8	22.22%	5	13.89%	36
2	615	71.56%	74	9.57%	84	10.87%	773
3	226	65.68%	87	21.48%	52	12.84%	405
4	332	82.79%	37	9.23%	32	7.98%	401
5	319	67.73%	80	16.99%	72	15.29%	471
6	193	61.86%	64	20.51%	55	17.63%	312
7	502	74.15%	99	14.62%	76	11.23%	677
8	448	76.32%	49	8.35%	90	15.33%	587
9	89	54.27%	42	25.61%	33	20.12%	164
10	96	48.98%	20	10.2%	80	40.82%	196
11	81	59.12%	19	13.87%	37	27.01%	137
12	146	36.96%	62	15.7%	187	47.34%	395
13	123	40.46%	58	19.08%	123	40.46%	304
14	206	36.52%	73	12.94%	285	50.53%	564
15	302	56.98%	44	8.3%	184	34.72%	530
16	253	52.06%	48	9.88%	185	38.07%	486
17	174	46.52%	33	8.82%	167	44.65%	374
18	222	57.96%	27	7.05%	134	34.99%	383
19	111	37.00%	32	10.67%	157	52.33%	300
20	106	37.86%	34	12.14%	140	50.00%	280
21	178	47.34%	45	11.97%	153	40.69%	376
21	197	80.74%	19	7.79%	28	11.48%	244
23	66	43.71%	44	29.14%	41	27.15%	151
24	338	59.19%	172	30.12%	61	10.68%	571

=== Republican nomination ===
Republicans cross endorsed candidate J. Stan McCauley, who had been running as an independent. This came despite McCauley identifying himself to be a Democrat. McCauley had twice before been a candidate for mayor.

=== Libertarian endorsement ===
Aaron Lewis, founder and director of the Scribe's Institute, changed his party affiliation from Democratic to Libertarian few months before the election and ran as their nominee.

=== Independent candidates ===
- W. Michael Downes
- Giselle Gigi Jacobs
- Aaron Lewis (Libertarian)
- Eddie Perez, former mayor (2001–2010)

==== Write-in candidates ====
- Tylon R. Butler

=== General election results ===
2019 Hartford mayoral election results
Party	Candidate	Votes	%
Democratic	Luke Bronin (incumbent)	7,638	76.51
Independent Democrat	Eddie Perez	1,221	12.23
Republican	James Stanley McCauley	846	8.47
Independent	Giselle Gigi Jacobs	146	1.46
Libertarian	Aaron Lewis	59	0.59
Independent	Michael Downes	39	0.39
Write-in	Tylon R. Butler	34	0.34
Turnout		9,983	14.74

== 2023 ==
2023 Hartford mayoral election
- November 7, 2023

Candidate	Arunan Arulampalam	Nick Lebron	Eric D. Coleman
Party	Democratic	Independent Democrat	Independent Democrat
Popular vote	4,702	907	737
Percentage	62.0%	11.97%	10.8%
Candidate	Michael T. McGarry	James Stanley McCauley
Party	Republican	Independent Democrat
Popular vote	485	443
Percentage	6.4%	5.9%
Mayor before election
Luke Bronin
Democratic
Elected mayor
Arunan Arulampalam
Democratic

The 2023 Hartford mayoral election was held on November 7, 2023. Incumbent Democrat Luke Bronin did not run for reelection to a third term.

=== Democratic primary ===
The Democratic primary was held on September 12. Arunan Arulampalam was endorsed by both the Hartford Democratic Party and outgoing Mayor Bronin ahead of the primary. He defeated former state Superior Court justice Eric Coleman and state senator John Fonfara in the primary.

==== Candidates ====
===== Nominee =====
- Arunan Arulampalam, CEO of the Hartford Land Bank

===== Eliminated in primary =====
- Eric Coleman, former Connecticut Superior Court justice and former state senator
- John Fonfara, state senator

===== Did not qualify =====
- Renardo Dunn, pastor
- Tracy Funnye
- Giselle Jacobs, activist and entrepreneur
- Nick Lebron, city councilor
- James Stanley McCauley, broadcaster

===== Declined =====
- Luke Bronin, incumbent mayor

==== Results ====
2023 Hartford mayoral Democratic primary results
Party	Candidate	Votes	%
Democratic	Arunan Arulampalam	2,121	40.52%
Democratic	Eric Coleman	1,574	30.07%
Democratic	John Fonfara	1,540	29.42%
Turnout		5,235	

=== Republican primary ===
Mike T. McGarry was unopposed for the Republican nomination. McCarry had previously been the party's mayoral nominee in 1979 and 2003.

=== Independent candidates ===
Jacobs, Lebron, and McCauley all successfully petitioned their way onto the ballot after failing to make the Democratic primary ballot.

- Mark Stewart Greenstein, attorney and perennial candidate
- Giselle Jacobs, activist and entrepreneur
- Nick Lebron, city councilor
- James Stanley McCauley, broadcaster

=== Results ===
2023 Hartford mayoral general election results
Party	Candidate	Votes	%
Democratic	Arunan Arulampalam	4,702	62.05%
Independent	Nick Lebron	907	11.97%
Write-in	Eric Coleman	803	10.60%
Republican	Michael T. McGarry	485	6.40%
Independent	James Stanley McCauley	443	5.85%
Independent	Giselle Jacobs	213	2.81%
Independent	Mark Stewart Greenstein	18	0.24%
Write-in	Odile Dilone	4	0.05%
Write-in	Tracy Funnye	3	0.04%
Turnout		7,578	

=== External links ===
Official campaign websites

- Arunan Arulampalam (D) for Mayor
- Eric Coleman (D) for Mayor
- John Fonfara (D) for Mayor
- Giselle Jacobs (D) for Mayor
- James Stanley McCauley (D) for Mayor
- Nick Lebron (D) for Mayor
