= Connecticut's 3rd House of Representatives district =

American legislative district

Connecticut's 3rd State House of Representatives district
Representative
Minnie Gonzalez; D

Connecticut's 3rd House of Representatives district elects one member of the Connecticut House of Representatives. Its current representative is Minnie Gonzalez. The district consists of part of the city of Hartford, including the neighborhoods of Parkville and Frog Hollow. The district is one of few in Connecticut to have a Hispanic majority population. Owing to this fact, it is one of the safest House districts in Connecticut for Democrats; a Republican candidate has not run in the district in over a decade.

== List of representatives ==
List of Representatives from Connecticut's 3rd State House District
Representative	Party	Years	District home	Note
A. Lucille Matarese	Democratic	1967–1969	Hartford	Seat created
Nicholas M. Motto	Democratic	1969–1973	Hartford	
Paul A. LaRosa	Democratic	1973–1983	Hartford	
Arthur A. Brouillet Jr.	Democratic	1983–1989	Hartford	
Juan Figeuroa	Democratic	1989–1993	Hartford	Resigned in 1993
Ilia Castro	Democratic	1993–1997	Hartford	Elected in 1993 special election
Minnie Gonzalez	Democratic	1997–	Hartford	Incumbent

== Recent elections ==
State Election 2008: House District 3
Party	Candidate	Votes	%	±%
Democratic	Minnie Gonzalez	3,628	100.0	+8.0
Majority		3,628	100.0	+0.0
Turnout		3,628		
Democratic hold		Swing	0.0	

State Election 2006: House District 3
Party	Candidate	Votes	%	±%
Democratic	Minnie Gonzalez	1,668	92.0	−2.7
Working Families	Minnie Gonzalez	146	8.0	+2.7
Majority		1,814	100.0	+5.3
Turnout		1,814		
Democratic hold		Swing	+5.3	

Democratic Primary, August 8, 2006: House District 3
Party	Candidate	Votes	%	±%
Democratic	Minnie Gonzalez	1,032	71.8	
Democratic	Frank Dejesus	406	28.2	
Majority		626	43.5	
Turnout		1,438		

State Election 2004: House District 3
Party	Candidate	Votes	%	±%
Democratic	Minnie Gonzalez	2,895	94.7	−5.3
Working Families	Joseph Clifford Barber	162	5.3	+5.3
Majority		2,733	89.4	−10.6
Turnout		3,057		
Democratic hold		Swing	-5.3	

State Election 2002: House District 3
Party	Candidate	Votes	%	±%
Democratic	Minnie Gonzalez	1,917	100.0	0.0
Majority		1,917	100.0	0.0
Turnout		1,917		
Democratic hold		Swing	0.0	

State Election 2000: House District 3
Party	Candidate	Votes	%	±%
Democratic	Minnie Gonzalez	2,201	100.0	0.0
Majority		2,201	100.0	0.0
Turnout		2,201		
Democratic hold		Swing	0.0	

Democratic Primary, September 12, 2000: House District 3
Party	Candidate	Votes	%	±%
Democratic	Minnie Gonzalez	498	83.3	
Democratic	Martha Allen-Johnson	100	16.7	
Majority		398	66.6	
Turnout		598		

State Election 1998: House District 3
Party	Candidate	Votes	%	±%
Democratic	Minnie Gonzalez	1,291	100.0	
Majority		1,291	100.0	
Turnout		1,291		
Democratic hold		Swing		
