= Juan Figueroa (activist) =

American politician and activist (born 1953)

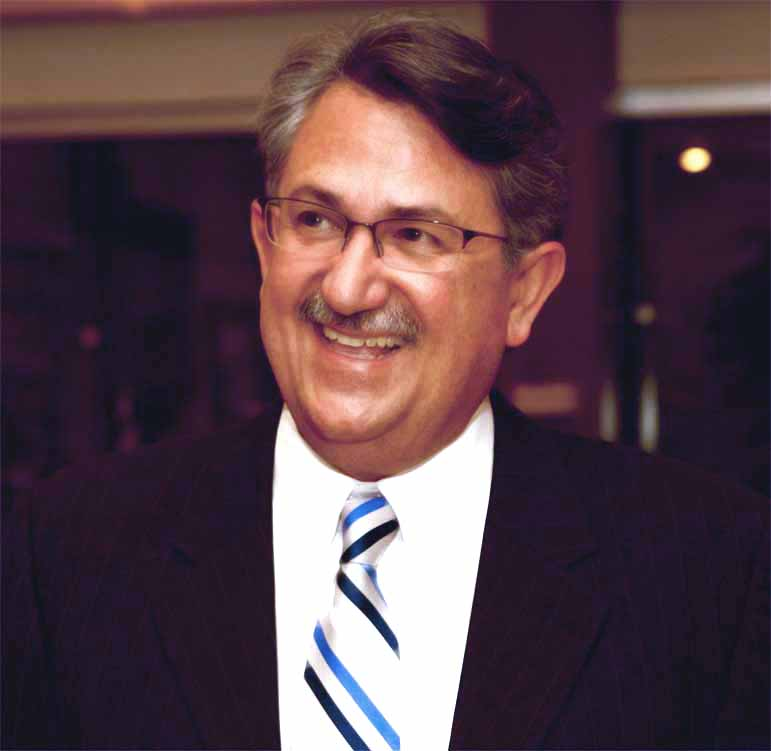

Member of the Connecticut House of Representatives from the 3rd district
- In office 1989–1993
- Preceded by: Arthur A. Brouillet Jr.
- Succeeded by: Ilia Castro

Personal details
- Born: November 13, 1953 (age 73) Ciales, Puerto Rico
- Spouse: Helene Figueroa
- Education: Santa Clara University School of Law (JD)
- Occupation: Consultant

Juan A. Figueroa (born November 13, 1953) is an American consultant and political activist. He is a principal with Helene Figueroa at Soltaino Consultants, a strategic planning, applied research, advocacy and health philanthropy nonprofit consulting firm recognized for authoring an in-depth study on the health status of immigrants and refugees in the U.S. state of Missouri (2019–present).

Previously, he served as the president and CEO of the Jefferson Foundation, a $150 million foundation awarding health and services grants in Jefferson County, Missouri. From 2013 to 2015, Figueroa was Chief of Staff for Mayor Pedro Segarra of Hartford, Conn. He was also the founding president of Universal Health Care Foundation of Connecticut. Prior to that he served as president and general counsel of the Puerto Rican Legal Defense and Education Fund. In 2010, Figueroa pursued the Democratic Party nomination for governor of Connecticut.

== Biography ==
Born and raised in Ciales, Puerto Rico, Figueroa is the grandson of tenant farmer Don Claudio Figueroa Colon and the son of Juan Figueroa Nazario, a Korean War veteran, and his wife Josefa Agosto Rosario, a seamstress and chaplain. He attended Macalester College on scholarship and earned a J.D. degree from Santa Clara University School of Law. He and his wife, Helene Figueroa, live in Atlanta, Georgia and have one daughter.

== Professional and political careers ==
After Figueroa's undergraduate studies, he moved to New Hampshire and worked as a community organizer, going door-to-door to organize Latinos regarding employment and educational issues. Following law school, Figueroa moved to Hartford and served as an Assistant Attorneys General, where he litigated day care center abuse cases and violations of environmental laws. Subsequently, he won election to the Connecticut General Assembly from Hartford's Third District. After three terms, he left the legislature to become the president and general counsel of the Puerto Rican Legal Defense and Education Fund (now "LatinoJustice PRLDEF"), a national civil rights group based in New York City.

After nearly a decade in New York City, he returned to Connecticut to head Universal Health Care Foundation of Connecticut. At the foundation he oversaw the effort to pass a Connecticut universal health care bill. The legislative undertaking was successful. Governor Jodi Rell vetoed the bill; Figueroa's group organized the coalition that successfully lobbied the legislature to override the veto. A nine-member board was established and charged with coming up with a specific plan for a statewide public health insurance plan entitled SustiNet by January 2011. In January 2010, he took a leave of absence to launch his Connecticut gubernatorial campaign.

Following his bid for the Democratic Party nomination for governor of Connecticut in 2010, he returned to Universal Health Care Foundation to lead a succession plan. He later served as Chief of Staff for Mayor Pedro Segarra (2013–2015) and later took the helm as president and CEO of the Jefferson Foundation in Festus, Mo. (2017–2019). He is a principal with Helene C. Figueroa at Soltaino Consultants, a strategic planning, applied research, advocacy and health philanthropy nonprofit consulting firm.

Figueroa has appeared on national news programs, including The Today Show, Crossfire, The O'Reilly Factor, Fox and Telemundo. He is a former columnist for The Hartford Courant. He currently serves on the Latinos for National Health Insurance and is a past board member of the Progreso Latino Fund, the Connecticut Public Health Association, and the Partnership for Strong Communities. The Hartford Business Journal, the region's largest business publication, named him one of its "Health Care Heroes" for his contribution to the advancement of health care in Connecticut.

== 2010 Connecticut gubernatorial campaign ==
Figueroa was attempting to win the Democratic nomination through a direct primary, skipping the traditional nominating convention. This required him to obtain the signature of 15,000 registered Democrats. If he succeeded, he would have been the first statewide candidate to force a direct primary since the option was added to state law.

On May 7, Figueroa dropped out of the governor's race, citing the difficulty of raising money in a potential battle against millionaires.

In July, he returned as president of Universal Health Care Foundation of Connecticut.

== See also ==
- Connecticut gubernatorial election, 2010
- SustiNet
- Universal Health Care Foundation of Connecticut

Connecticut House of Representatives
Preceded by Arthur A. Brouillet, Jr.	Member of the Connecticut House of Representatives from the 3rd district 1989–1993	Succeeded by Ilia Castro
