= Thomas Kimberly Brace =

American politician

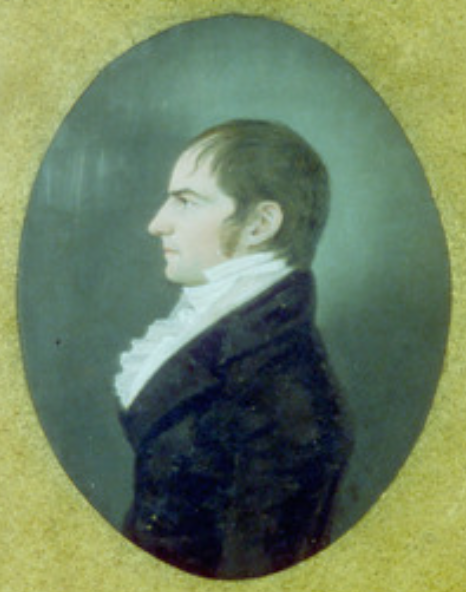
Thomas Kimberly Brace, (1779–1860), Connecticut

Thomas Kimberly Brace (October 16, 1779 – June 14, 1860) was an American insurance executive and politician, who founded the insurance company Aetna, now part of the S&P 500. He is considered the "father" of American life insurance.

He was the son of Congressman Jonathan Brace, and was born in Glastenbury, Connecticut, October 16, 1779. He graduated from Yale University in 1801. He was through life a prominent citizen of Hartford, Connecticut.

For many years he was a merchant there, and in 1819 he became the principal founder and developer of the Aetna (Fire) Insurance Company, established in Hartford. Brace served as the company's first president (and would remain on the Board of Directors until his death).

In 1819, he also became the founder, board director and vice president of the Hartford Society for Savings. He later became the vice president of the Phoenix Bank, board director of the United States Branch Bank, and president of the Hartford County Savings Bank.

In 1820 Brace authored the rewriting of the company charter allowing Aetna to underwrite life insurance and annuities, earning Brace the title of "father" of American life insurance.

He was a Representative of the town of Hartford in the Legislature of Connecticut, and was mayor of Hartford from 1840 to 1843.

He died in Hartford, June 14, 1860, aged 80.

== Sources ==
This article incorporates public domain material from the Yale Obituary Record.
