= Carrie Saxon Perry =

American politician

- Perry in 1987

63rd Mayor of Hartford
- In office December 1, 1987 – December 7, 1993
- Preceded by: Thirman L. Milner
- Succeeded by: Michael P. Peters

Personal details
- Born: August 30, 1931 Hartford, Connecticut, U.S.
- Died: November 22, 2018 (aged 87) Waterbury, Connecticut, U.S.
- Party: Democratic
- Education: Howard University

Carrie Saxon Perry (August 30, 1931 – November 22, 2018) was an American politician from Connecticut. She was notable as the first African American woman to be elected mayor of a major New England city – Hartford, Connecticut – in 1987. She served three terms before being defeated in 1993. She served as a member of the Connecticut House of Representatives from 1980 until 1987. Perry was known for her distinctive broad-rimmed hats.

== Early life and career ==
Perry was born on August 30, 1931, in Hartford to David Saxon and Mabel Lee. She was primarily raised by her grandmother after her father left the family when she was only six months old.

She graduated from Howard University with a degree of economics and attended Howard University School of Law for two years before leaving school to marry James Perry, Jr. After leaving law school, she worked with a number of community organizations and help establish boards for organizations such as Planned Parenthood. She also worked for the state welfare agency.

== Political career ==
Her first run for state representative ended in defeat in 1976. She was elected in 1980 and served until her election as mayor. She was selected as an assistant majority leader, chair of the bonding subcommittee, and a committee member for education, finance and housing.

She became known for donning unique hats, of which she owned about two dozen. She said she started the habit because she didn't have time to take care of her hair.

=== Mayorship ===
Perry was elected the mayor of Hartford at the age of 56.

In 1987, Mayor Thirman L. Milner, the city’s first African American mayor, announced that he would not seek re-election to city hall. Perry entered the race and won the endorsement of the local Democratic Party. In the general election, she defeated Republican Philip Steele with 58 percent of the vote.

She was credited for helping reduce racial tension in the city; notably, she visited black neighborhoods after the Rodney King verdict, which was credited with preventing rioting in Hartford as had happened in other large cities. She championed LGBT rights in Hartford during her mayorship, introducing legislation to prohibit discrimination based on sexual orientation in Hartford schools, 5 years before such legislation was adopted in Connecticut. She also focused on reducing burgeoning gang activity and drug trafficking, which was on the rise at the time. The position in Hartford is considered largely ceremonial, and paid a stipend of $17,500.

After three terms as mayor, she was defeated by first-time Democratic challenger Michael Peters, a city firefighter. He had run on a campaign capitalizing on Hartford's declining economy and a sense that street crime was on the rise.

=== Later career ===
In 2002, Perry became president of the NAACP (Hartford chapter).

== Personal life ==
Perry married James Perry, Jr. from whom she was divorced. She had a son, four grandchildren, and two great grandchildren.

Perry died in Waterbury on November 22, 2018, at the age of 87. However, her death remained unreported until November 2019.

== See also ==
- List of first African-American mayors
