= Thirman Milner =

American politician (1933–2024)

Thirman L. Milner

Member of the Connecticut State Senate from the 2nd district
- In office 1993–1995
- Preceded by: Frank D. Barrows
- Succeeded by: Eric D. Coleman

62nd Mayor of Hartford
- In office December 1, 1981 – December 1, 1987
- Preceded by: George A. Athanson
- Succeeded by: Carrie Saxon Perry

Member of the Connecticut House of Representatives from the 7th district
- In office 1979–1981
- Preceded by: Clyde Billington Jr.
- Succeeded by: Ervin Booker III

Personal details
- Born: October 29, 1933 Hartford, Connecticut, U.S.
- Died: November 29, 2024 (aged 91) Hartford, Connecticut, U.S.
- Party: Democratic
- Education: New York University

Military service
- Allegiance: United States
- Branch/service: United States Air Force

Thirman Leonard Milner (October 29, 1933 – November 29, 2024) was an American politician from Hartford, Connecticut. A Democrat, he served as the 62nd Mayor of Hartford from 1981 to 1987 and was the first popularly elected black mayor in New England.

== Life and career ==
Thirman Milner was born in Hartford, Connecticut's North End. Milner was the sixth child born out of seven children. Milner's father died when Milner was young. Milner largely grew up on Hartford's South End, though he spent some parts of his youth living in Asylum Hill.

During his childhood his mother, Grace Milner, who was working to support her family, went on welfare.

During part of his childhood, he lived in Glastonbury, Connecticut, with a relative that operated a summer camp. While living in Glastonbury, Milner became a member of Future Farmers of America, worked as a camp counselor, and attended high school at Glastonbury High School, which he dropped out of during his junior year.

In the early 1950s, he received a high school equivalency diploma while serving in the United States Air Force.

Milner attended New York University, initially wanting to major in pharmacy. While in college, a speech by Martin Luther King Jr. inspired Milner to pursue a life of public service.

Milner worked as a hospital orderly, a clerk at a drug store, an insurance salesman, an anti-poverty worker, and a civil rights activist.

In 1976, he ran a primary campaign against Connecticut state representative Clyde Billington Jr. He lost the primary to Billington by only five votes. In 1978, he challenged Billington again, and won election.

In 1978, he worked on the mayoral campaign of George A. Athanson.

=== Mayoralty ===
In 1981, Thirman Milner defeated incumbent George A. Athanson in a second Democratic primary election. Athanson had won the first primary by 94 votes but it was re-run after Milner contested the results and a court agreed that there had been irregularities. Milner was elected mayor in a three-way race against Independent Robert F. Ludgin and Republican Michael T. McGarry. He was the first popularly elected black mayor in New England. Milner won re-election in 1983 and again in 1985.

=== State assembly ===
After serving three terms as mayor of Hartford, Milner was elected to a single term in the Connecticut House of Representatives, representing the seventh district. He served in the Connecticut Senate starting in 1992, declining to run for reelection from the second district in 1994 for health reasons.

=== Death ===
Milner died in Hartford on November 29, 2024. He was 91 years old.

== Legacy ==
The Thirman L. Milner Middle Grades Academy (formerly Thirman L. Milner School), a middle school in Hartford, is named after him.

== Works ==
- Up from Slavery: A History from Slavery to City Hall in New England

== See also ==
- List of first African-American mayors
