= Clyde Billington Jr. =

American chemist, businessman, and politician (1934–2018)

Member of the Connecticut House of Representatives from the 7th district
- In office 1971–1979
- Preceded by: Norris L. O'Neill
- Succeeded by: Thirman Milner

Personal details
- Born: August 29, 1934 Hartford, Connecticut, U.S.
- Died: April 2, 2018 (aged 83) Hartford, Connecticut, U.S.
- Party: Democratic
- Education: Lincoln University

Clyde Mark Billington Jr. (August 29, 1934 – April 2, 2018) was an American chemist, businessman, and politician.

Billington was born in Hartford, Connecticut and went to Weaver High School. Billington was African American. He received his bachelor of science degree from Lincoln University, in Chester County, Pennsylvania. He served in the United States Army in the Chemical Corps. He then worked as a chemist for Pratt & Whitney. Billington was in the real estate and liquor businesses in Hartford, Connecticut. Billington served in the Connecticut House of Representatives as a Democrat from 1971 to 1979. He also served as the first chairman of the Legislative Black and Puerto Rican Caucus, formed in 1976. The caucus was dedicated to the advancement of African-American and Latino-American people and has worked to expand economic and educational opportunities for these communities. Billington died at St. Francis Hospital in Hartford, Connecticut.
