= Arunan Arulampalam =

American politician (born 1985)

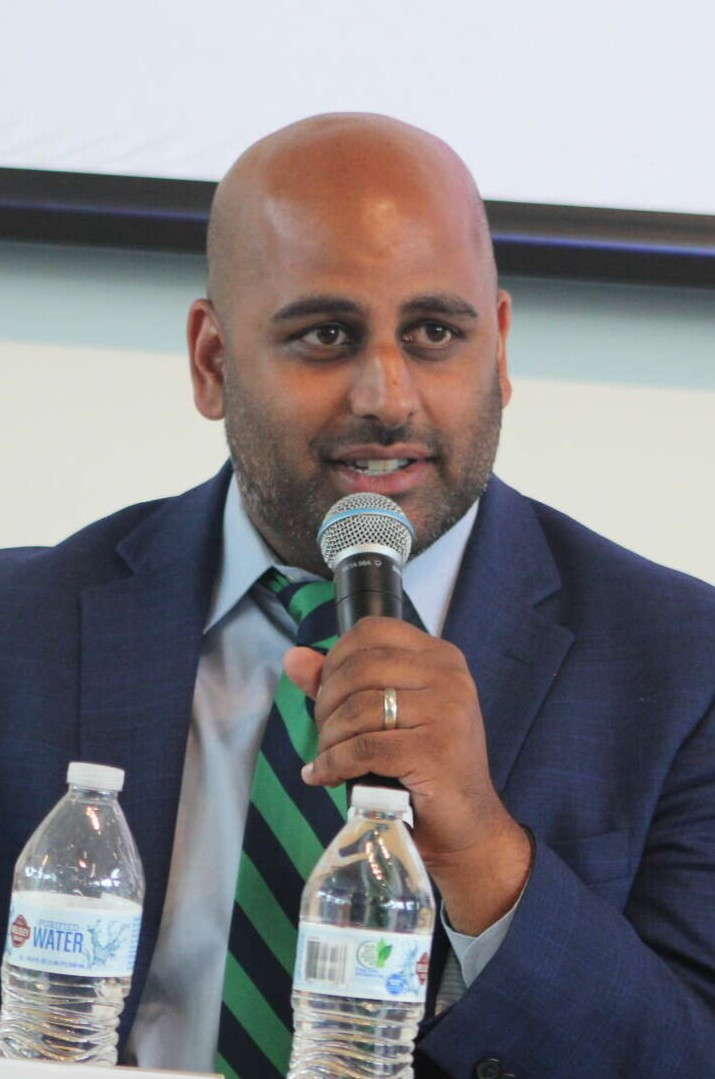
- Arulampalam in 2025

68th Mayor of Hartford
- Incumbent
- Assumed office January 1, 2024
- Preceded by: Luke Bronin

Personal details
- Born: September 15, 1985 (age 41) Bulawayo, Zimbabwe
- Party: Democratic
- Spouse: Liza Butler
- Children: 5
- Education: Emory University (BA); Quinnipiac University (JD)

Arunan Arulampalam (born September 15, 1985) is an American politician who is the 68th mayor of Hartford, Connecticut. A member of the Democratic Party, Arulampalam won the November 2023 election for mayor and was sworn in on January 1, 2024.

== Early life and career ==
Arulampalam is from a Sri Lankan Tamil family from Jaffna. His parents fled Sri Lanka in July 1983, during Black July at the start of the Sri Lankan Civil War. They moved to England, where they married, and settled in Zimbabwe. Arulampalam was born in Bulawayo in 1985. The family later took a vacation to California where they stayed with his uncle before they moved to a one-bedroom apartment. Arulampalam earned a Bachelor of Arts from Emory University and earned a Juris Doctor from Quinnipiac University School of Law.

In 2014, Arulampalam joined the law firm Updike, Kelly & Spellacy and was an associate with the firm for five years. Ned Lamont, the governor of Connecticut appointed Arulampalam to be a deputy commissioner in the Department of Consumer Protection. In July 2021, he became the chief executive officer of the Hartford Land Bank, a non-profit aiming to reduce urban blight.

== Political career ==
In October 2017, Arulampalam announced that he was exploring a run for Connecticut State Treasurer, as long as Denise Nappier, the incumbent, opted not to run for reelection. He received enough support at the Democratic Party of Connecticut convention to qualify for the primary election ballot, but ended his campaign in May 2018, citing his desire to avoid a divisive campaign.

In January 2023, Arulampalam announced his candidacy in the November election for mayor of Hartford, Connecticut. He won the party's endorsement at their nominating convention. Arulampalam defeated state senator John Fonfara and former state senator Eric D. Coleman in the Democratic Party primary election in September, receiving 39.6% of the vote. He won the November general election with 69% of the vote and was sworn into office on January 1, 2024.

== Personal life ==
Arulampalam and his wife, Liza, have five children and live in a house in Hartford's Frog Hollow. He is a naturalized U.S. citizen.

== Electoral history ==
=== Mayor of Hartford, Connecticut ===
General Election, 2023
Party	Candidate	Votes	%
Democratic	Arunan Arulampalam	4,702	62
Independent	Nick Lebron	907	12
Independent	Eric D. Coleman	803	10.6
Republican	Michael McGarry	485	6.4
Independent	James S. McCauley	443	5.8
Independent	Giselle Gigi Jacobs	213	2.8
Total votes		7,553	99.6

Political offices
Preceded by Luke Bronin	Mayor of Hartford, Connecticut; 2024–present	Incumbent
