= Ilia Castro =

American politician (born 1946)

Member of the Connecticut House of Representatives from the 3rd district
- In office 1993–1997
- Preceded by: Juan Figueroa
- Succeeded by: Minnie Gonzalez

Personal details
- Born: March 14, 1946
- Party: Democratic

Ilia J. Castro (born March 14, 1946) is an American politician who served in the Connecticut House of Representatives from 1993 to 1997, representing the 3rd district as a Democrat. She was first elected in a 1993 special election after her predecessor, Juan Figueroa, resigned. Figueroa endorsed Castro in the election. Castro moved from Mayagüez, Puerto Rico, to Hartford, Connecticut, around 1970.
