= Luke Bronin =

American politician and lawyer (born 1979)

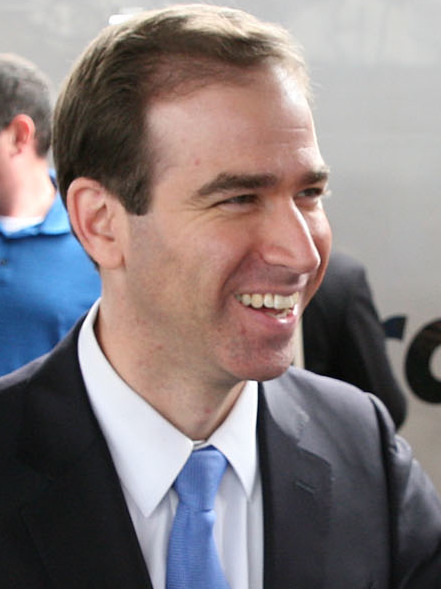
- Bronin in 2018

Member-elect of the U.S. House of Representatives from Connecticut's 1st district
- Assuming office January 3, 2027
- Succeeding: John B. Larson

67th Mayor of Hartford
- In office January 1, 2016 – January 1, 2024
- Preceded by: Pedro Segarra
- Succeeded by: Arunan Arulampalam

Personal details
- Born: Luke Aaron Bronin; June 30, 1979 (age 47) Westchester County, New York, U.S.
- Party: Democratic
- Spouse: Sara Galvan (m. 2007; div. 2024)
- Children: 3
- Education: Yale University (BA, JD); Balliol College, Oxford (MSc)
- Website: Campaign website

Military service
- Allegiance: United States
- Branch/service: United States Navy
- Rank: Lieutenant
- Unit: United States Navy Reserve
- Battles/wars: War in Afghanistan

Luke Aaron Bronin (born June 30, 1979) is an American politician and lawyer who served as the 67th mayor of Hartford, Connecticut, from 2016 to 2024. A member of the Democratic Party, he is the member-elect for Connecticut's 1st congressional district in 2026, having defeated incumbent John B. Larson in the primary, and won the general election.

Prior to serving as mayor, Bronin was general counsel for Connecticut governor Dannel Malloy. Before that, he served in two senior posts at the United States Department of the Treasury during President Barack Obama's first term as senior advisor to the deputy secretary of the treasury, and later as deputy assistant secretary of the treasury for terrorist financing and financial crimes. Bronin has served as an officer in the U.S. Navy Reserve, and was deployed to Afghanistan and assigned to the Anti-Corruption Task Force. He also worked in the private sector, at The Hartford Financial Services Group, as chief of staff to the President of the Hartford's Property and Casualty Division. In December 2014, the law firm Hinckley Allen & Snyder LLP announced Bronin would become a partner. Bronin was first elected mayor of Hartford in 2015 and was re-elected in 2019.

== Early life and education ==
Bronin was born in Westchester County, New York, and completed high school at Phillips Exeter Academy in New Hampshire before he attended Yale University as an undergraduate. Upon graduation he attended the Balliol College, Oxford as a Rhodes Scholar, where he shared a house with Wes Moore. He returned to the United States to earn a Juris Doctor at Yale Law School.

== Career ==
After graduation from Yale Law School, Bronin joined The Hartford Insurance Company in the Asylum Hill neighborhood of Hartford, where he worked first as associate counsel and assistant to the general counsel, and then as chief of staff to the President of The Hartford's Property and Casualty Division Neal Wolin. He is a partner at the private law firm Hinckley Allen LLP.

=== Early political work ===
In 2004, Bronin ran the re-election campaign of Democratic state senator Andrew J. McDonald. McDonald went on to become the first Connecticut Supreme Court Justice from the LGBT community.

In 2006, Bronin served as deputy campaign manager for Dannel Malloy's run for Governor of Connecticut.

=== Military service ===
Bronin served as a commissioned intelligence officer in the Navy Reserve. He was a member of the military's anti-corruption task force during his deployment to Afghanistan from September 2010 to April 2011. He left active service as a lieutenant.

=== Obama administration ===
During the first term of President Barack Obama's administration, Bronin served in appointed positions at the U.S. Department of the Treasury. He first served as Senior Advisor to his former boss, the Deputy Secretary of the United States Treasury Neal Wolin.

Bronin was then named Deputy Assistant Secretary of the Treasury for Terrorist Financing and Financial Crimes. He also testified before Congress in his official capacity.

=== Mayor of Hartford ===
Before running for mayor, Bronin joined the Governor Dannel Malloy's administration as general counsel in January 2013.

In 2015, he ran in and won the Democratic primary in the Hartford Mayoral election against an incumbent, Mayor Pedro Segarra. In July 2015, the Hartford Democratic Town Council endorsed Bronin. Then, in a September 2015 primary, he defeated Mayor Segarra by a ten-point margin. Following the primary victory, he was endorsed by Connecticut Governor Dannel Malloy and Senators Richard Blumenthal and Chris Murphy. He won the general election on November 3, 2015.

Although he pledged that he would serve out his full term as mayor, in December 2017, Bronin formed an exploratory committee to run for Governor of Connecticut in 2018. He abandoned his bid in April 2018 after failing to gain traction. During his campaign, he was criticized for soliciting campaign donations from Hartford public employees using their government email accounts, a misstep that led to a complaint with the Connecticut Elections Enforcement Commission. The campaign had removed ".gov" email addresses from the list but Hartford public school employee email addresses, approximately 50 on the list, end in ".org." The editorial board of the Hartford Courant called it “more of an honest mistake than a deliberate attempt to pressure” city employees.

In January 2019, Bronin announced he would seek reelection for mayor. He faced challenges in the Democratic primary from former Mayor Eddie Perez, who was first elected in 2001 but resigned from office in 2010 after being convicted on corruption charges, and Connecticut State Representative Brandon McGee. Bronin was victorious in the September 10 Democratic primary, capturing nearly 60% of the vote. Perez challenged Bronin again in the general election as an independent candidate. Several other challengers faced Bronin in the November 5 general election. They were TV entrepreneur J. Stan McCauley, a Democrat who was cross-endorsed by the Hartford Republican Town Committee and would appear on the Republican line in the general election, Aaron Lewis, president and CEO of The Scribe's Ink publishing service, and Giselle “Gigi” Jacobs, who owned a cleaning company, Sister Soldier Environmental Services. Lewis and Jacobs were also Democrats. Bronin won the general election by a broad margin, and was elected to a second term as mayor.

In 2022, Bronin announced he would not seek a third term as mayor.

=== 2026 congressional campaign ===
On July 30, 2025, Bronin announced that he would run for the U.S. House of Representatives in Connecticut's 1st congressional district, challenging Democratic incumbent John B. Larson. In an upset, Bronin defeated Larson at the Democratic Party's endorsement nomination convention held on May 11, 2026. He subsequently went on to win the primary on August 11, 2026. Bronin was one of five challengers that cycle to successfully defeat an incumbent Democratic congressperson, the others being Darializa Avila Chevalier, Melat Kiros, Brad Lander, and Donavan McKinney. He then won the general election, defeating Republican Amy Chai.

== Personal life ==
Bronin was married to Sara Cecilia Galvan. They met when they were both Rhodes Scholars. She was a professor at University of Connecticut Law School and is a past president of the Connecticut Hispanic Bar Association. They have three children. Bronin and his wife announced their decision to divorce in September 2024.

Bronin is a songwriter, guitarist, and singer, with a self-titled album of seven songs. One of his songs was played on the television show Dawson's Creek.

== See also ==
- Mayor of Hartford, Connecticut

Political offices
Preceded by Pedro Segarra	Mayor of Hartford; 2016–2024	Succeeded by Arunan Arulampalam
U.S. House of Representatives
Preceded by John B. Larson	Member of the U.S. House of Representatives from Connecticut's 1st congressional district Taking office 2027	Elect
