= Sara Bronin =

American architect

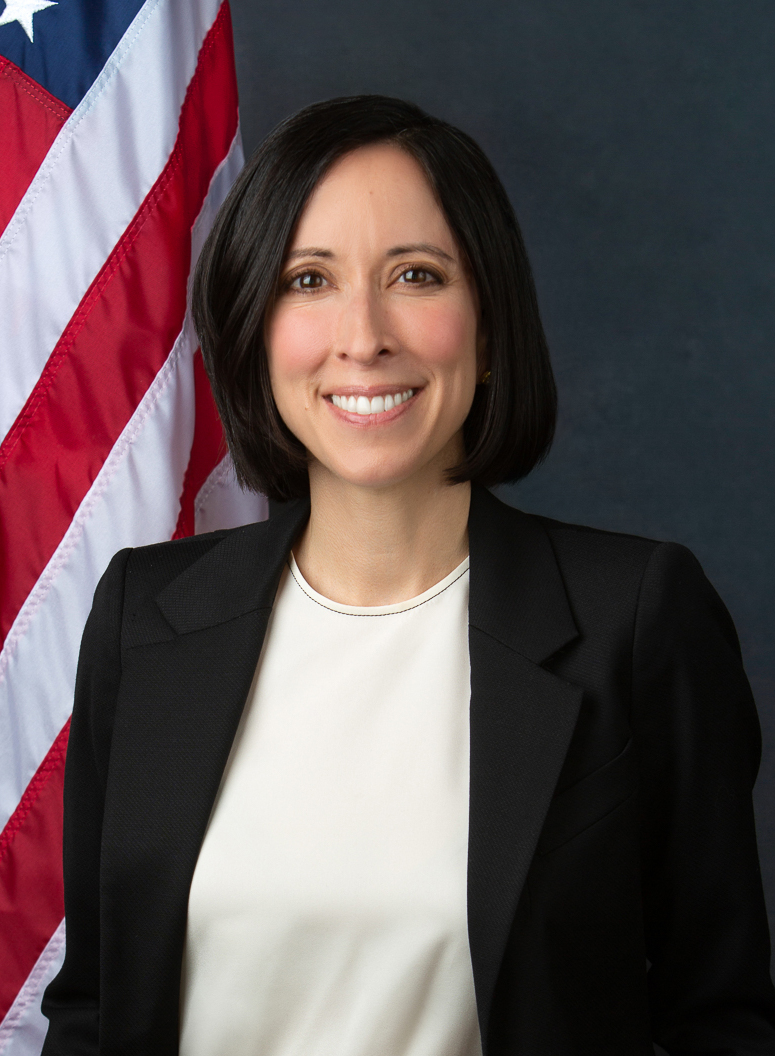
- Official portrait, 2023

Chair of the Advisory Council on Historic Preservation
- In office January 31, 2023 – December 31, 2024
- President: Joe Biden
- Preceded by: Aimee Jorjani
- Succeeded by: TBD

Personal details
- Born: Sara Cecilia Galvan; 1978 (age 47–48) Houston, Texas, U.S.
- Party: Democratic
- Spouse: Luke Bronin (m. 2007; div. 2024)
- Education: University of Texas, Austin (BArch, BA); Magdalen College, Oxford (MSc); Columbia University (attended); Yale University (JD)

Sara Cecilia Bronin (née Galvan) is an American lawyer, professor, and architect. She served as the chair of the Advisory Council on Historic Preservation from 2023 to 2024.

== Early life and education ==
Bronin graduated from the University of Texas at Austin in 2001, where she earned degrees in architecture and the Plan II honors program. She attended Magdalen College, Oxford, on a Rhodes Scholarship. While there, she co-founded the Oxonian Review and served as its publisher. In 2003, she graduated with a master's degree in economic and social history. She earned a Truman Scholarship for public service, which she used for law school. She spent one year at Columbia Law School before transferring to Yale Law School and was senior editor of the Yale Law & Policy Review and graduated in 2006.

== Career ==
Bronin currently serves as the Freda H. Alverson Professor of Law at the George Washington University Law School. Bronin was previously a professor at Cornell University at its school of Architecture, Art and Planning and associate faculty at Cornell Law School. Prior to Cornell, she was a professor of law at the University of Connecticut School of Law. Her interdisciplinary work focuses on how law and policy can foster more equitable, sustainable, well-designed, and connected places.

She is the co-author of a land use treatise, and books on land use and historic preservation law. In addition, she has written dozens of articles, including a 2021 article on road design and federalism in the Iowa Law Review, a 2021 book chapter on the Secretary of the Interior's Standards for Rehabilitation, a 2020 article called "Zoning for Families" in the Indiana Law Journal, and a 2009 article on Solar Rights. She also led the research team behind the Connecticut Zoning Atlas, a groundbreaking project that is the first interactive GIS map of all zoning regulations in a single state. Drawing from that project, she founded the National Zoning Atlas in 2022, which aims to depict key aspects of zoning codes in an online, user-friendly map.

In 2012, she argued in the Vanderbilt Law Review that a primary obstacle blocking "building-related renewable energy" (BRRE) projects was not siting considerations but legal obstacles preventing developers from allocating renewable energy costs to end users. She is working to coordinate the land use portion of the forthcoming Fourth Restatement of Property. She is a past president of the Connecticut Hispanic Bar Association. She has served as an expert witness and as a consultant to cities, state agencies, and private firms interested in creating or facilitating places of value. Among other projects, she served as lead attorney and development strategist for the 360 State Street project, a mixed-use, transit-oriented, LEED-Platinum project in New Haven, Connecticut. She wrote an amicus brief to the Texas Supreme Court, joined by legal scholars and nonprofit organizations, to support the City of Houston's successful defense of an attack on its historic preservation ordinance. She studied microgrid efforts around the United States as a means of preventing energy sprawl and handling energy blackouts. She advocated efforts to limit use of water and energy in architectural building standards. She has also submitted written comments to federal agencies, including one to the Department of the Interior on proposed changes to the National Register of Historic Places regulations. She has also testified many times before the Connecticut General Assembly about legislative matters, including most recently on statewide zoning reform proposals.

In 2021, Bronin founded a coalition of more than 70 nonprofit organizations called Desegregate Connecticut to advocate for zoning reform to enable affordable housing opportunities. The coalition successfully advocated for the adoption of major zoning reform, adopted into Public Act 21-29 in 2021.

In 2023, Bronin completed a report for the city of Boston which outlined the need for the city's zoning code to be overhauled.

=== Biden administration ===
On June 24, 2021, President Joe Biden nominated Bronin to head the Advisory Council on Historic Preservation. Hearings were held before the Senate Energy Committee on the nomination on September 21, 2021. The committee favorably reported the nomination to the Senate floor on November 18, 2021. Bronin's initial nomination expired at the end of the year and was returned to President Biden on January 3, 2022.

President Biden renominated her the following day. On March 8, 2022, the committee favorably reported Bronin's nomination to the Senate floor. Her nomination was confirmed on December 22, 2022.

== Awards and recognition ==
She is an advocate for historic preservation. She previously chaired Hartford’s Planning & Zoning Commission, chaired Preservation Connecticut, and served on the board of Save the Sound. The City of Hartford’s zoning code was awarded the 2020 Richard H. Driehaus Form-Based Codes Award from Smart Growth America and the Form-Based Codes Institute.

As a licensed architect, she received the 2014 Alice Washburn Award of the AIA of Connecticut in the category of Renovations and Additions. She won the Connecticut Trust for Historic Preservation Award of Merit, and she was one of 11 winners in the 2013 Hartford Preservation Alliance Preservation Awards for her design and rehabilitation of her family's Civil War-era brownstone in downtown Hartford. The American Institute of Architects praised the renovation for "its blending of styles and for bringing the traditional into the present." In 2019, Bronin won the Pro Bene Meritis Award from the University of Texas College of Liberal Arts, the highest honor bestowed by the college.

== Personal life ==
Sara Bronin is a fifth-generation Texan, born in Houston. She is of Mexican American descent.

Bronin was married to former Hartford mayor Luke Bronin. The two announced their divorce in September 2024. They have three children. She administered the oath of office to her husband during the mayoral induction ceremony.

== Publications ==
- Historic Preservation Law, 2d ed. (2021)
- Land Use Regulation, 3d ed. (2020)
- Historic Preservation Law in a Nutshell, 2d ed. (2018)
