= Pedro Segarra =

Puerto Rican-American politician and lawyer (born 1959)

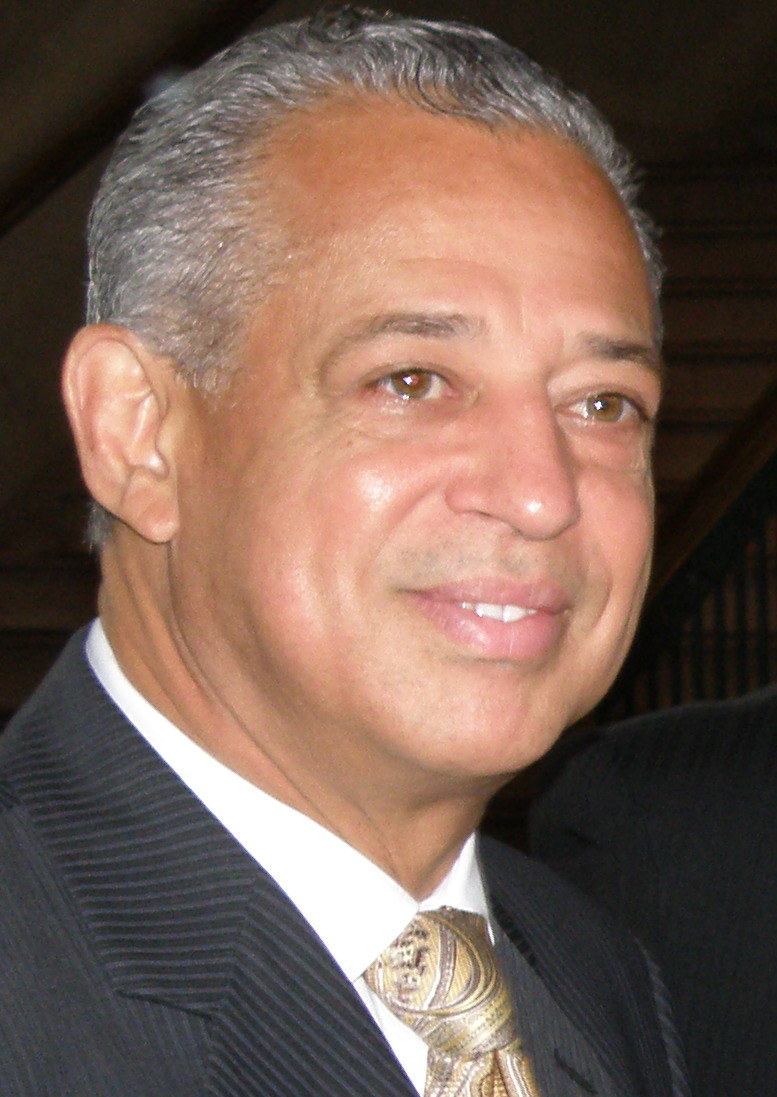

66th Mayor of Hartford
- In office June 25, 2010 – December 31, 2015
- Preceded by: Eddie Perez
- Succeeded by: Luke Bronin

Personal details
- Born: April 28, 1959 (age 67) Maricao, Puerto Rico
- Party: Democratic
- Spouse: Charlie Ortiz
- Education: Greater Hartford Community College; University of Hartford (BA); University of Connecticut (MSW); University of Connecticut School of Law (JD)
- Profession: attorney

Pedro E. Segarra (born April 28, 1959) is a Puerto Rican-American politician and lawyer who served as the 66th mayor of Hartford, Connecticut. Prior to becoming mayor, Segarra was president of Hartford's City Council. He succeeded former Mayor Eddie Perez who resigned after he was convicted by a state Superior Court jury of bribery and extortion in a political corruption case, though Perez' convictions eventually were reversed by the Connecticut Appellate Court. Segarra was sworn in as mayor on June 25, 2010, and won re-election on November 8, 2011. In 2015, Luke Bronin defeated Segarra for the Democratic mayoral nomination. He is Hartford's second mayor of Puerto Rican ancestry and the first openly gay mayor of the city. He is also the second openly gay mayor of an American state capital city (David Cicilline of neighboring Providence, Rhode Island was the first).

== Early life and career ==
Segarra was born in the small rural town of Maricao, Puerto Rico. At age seven his family relocated to the Bronx, New York in search of better opportunities. At the age of fifteen, Segarra moved to Hartford seeking a better life than what he was experiencing in New York City. A resident of Hartford since 1975, Segarra is an alum of Greater Hartford Community College, where he was a founding member of the college’s Latin American Student Organization. He later earned a full scholarship to the University of Hartford, where he received a Bachelor of Arts degree in political science.

Segarra was admitted to the University of Connecticut's Graduate School of Social Work, where he received a Master of Social Work. After graduation, he attended the University of Connecticut School of Law and graduated in 1985. He passed the Connecticut bar that same year. While in law school, Segarra was a founding member of the Latino Law Student Organization and became the organization's first President. He is a member of Connecticut's state and federal bars (since 1986) and the Bar of the State of Florida (since 2000).

In 1991, Segarra was appointed Corporation Counsel for the City of Hartford, the youngest person ever selected for the position at that time. and appointed for the position for three consecutive terms. He is also a founding member of Hartford's branch of Hogar CREA, the Hispanic Health Council (HHC), and Connecticut Latino/as Achieving Rights & Opportunities (CLARO).

In 2024, Segarra was appointed as a Connecticut Superior Court judge by governor Ned Lamont. After frequently missing work, Segarra took a disability retirement from the job in 2026.

== Personal life ==
Prior to becoming mayor, Segarra was a managing partner of the Law Office of Segarra & López, however after taking office he announced to his clients that he would be closing down his private practice to focus on his mayoral duties. As an active member of the community, Segarra resides in the West End of Hartford with his husband, Charlie Ortiz.

== See also ==
- List of Puerto Ricans

Political offices
Preceded by Eddie Perez	Mayor of Hartford; 2010–2015	Succeeded by Luke Bronin
