= Eddie Perez (politician) =

Puerto Rico-born politician

Eddie Pérez
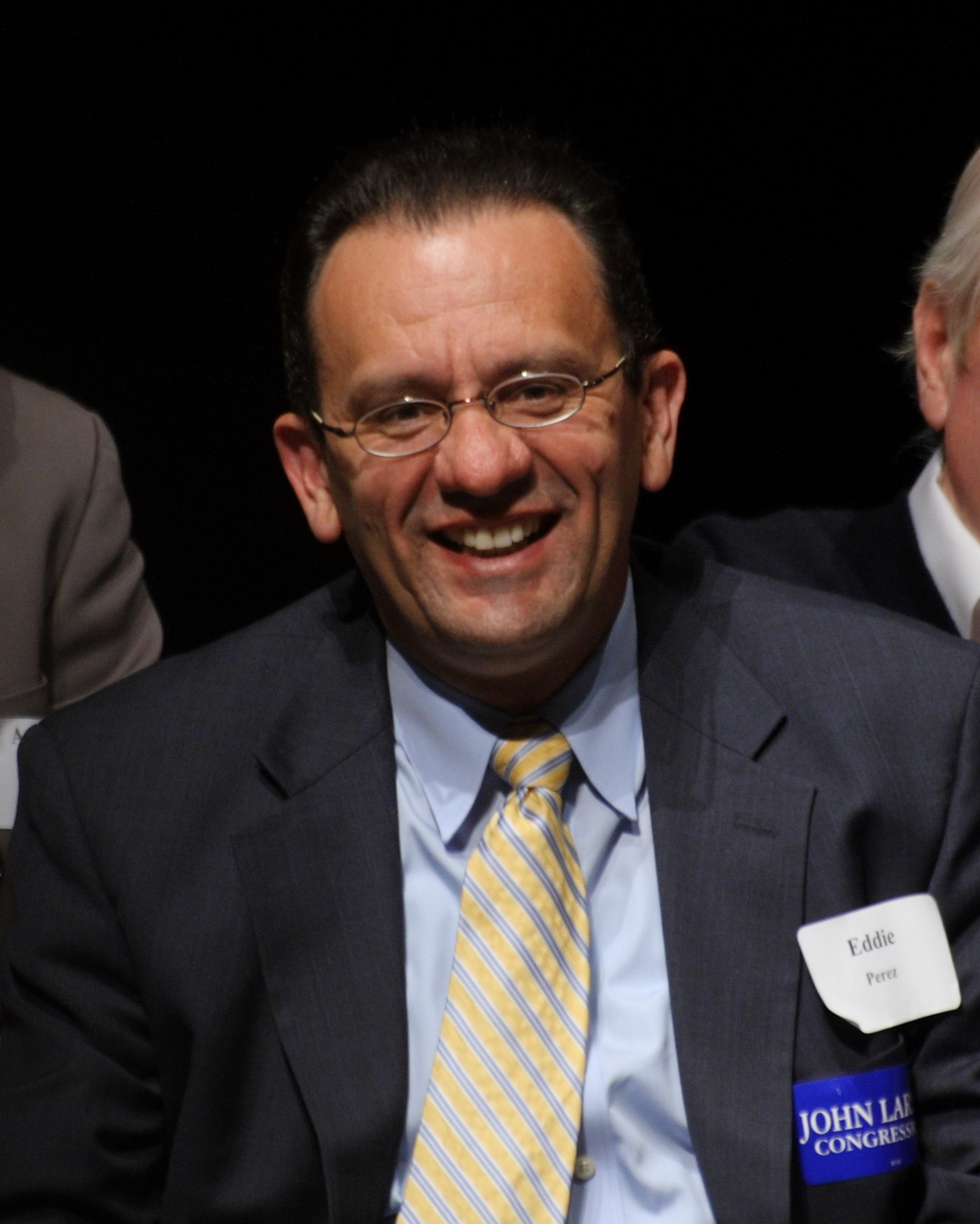
- Perez in 2008

65th Mayor of Hartford
- In office January 1, 2001 – June 25, 2010
- Preceded by: Michael P. Peters
- Succeeded by: Pedro Segarra

Personal details
- Born: 1957 (age 68–69) Corozal, Puerto Rico
- Party: Democratic
- Spouse: Maria Perez
- Education: Capital Community College (AS); Trinity College (BEc)

Eduardo Alberto "Eddie" Perez (born 1957) is an American politician who served as the 65th mayor of Hartford, Connecticut, from 2001 to 2010. Prior to entering politics, Perez worked as a community organizer. Perez served as the first mayor who was also the CEO of the city, a setup known as a Strong Mayor.

Perez was recognized in 2001 for his willingness to challenge the entrenched Hartford political machine and form a multi-party coalition focused on reforming the city government.

In 2017, he pleaded guilty to receiving bribes and criminal attempts to commit larceny in the first degree via extortion, both of which are felonies.

== Youth and early career ==
Eddie Alberto Pérez was born in 1957 in Corozal, Puerto Rico, where he spent much of his childhood. In 1969 the Pérez family moved with Eddie and his eight siblings to Hartford, Connecticut, which at the time had a growing Puerto Rican community. The family moved 14 times between the Clay Arsenal and Frog Hollow neighborhoods while Perez was growing up. During his youth, he was a member of the Ghetto Brothers gang. Perez graduated from Hartford Public High School and holds an associate degree from Capital Community College and a bachelor's degree in Economics from Trinity College (Connecticut).

Beginning in 1979 as a Volunteers in Service to America (VISTA) volunteer, Perez founded Organized Northeasterners/Clay Hill and North End Inc. (ONE/CHANE), a grassroots neighborhood organization dedicated to improving the housing and economic conditions in North Hartford. He then joined Make Something Happen, a program in Hartford's Stowe Village, as its director for two years.

In 1990, Perez became director of community and government relations at Trinity College. In 1999, Perez became the president of the Southside Institutions Neighborhood Alliance, an organization sponsored by Trinity College and Hartford Hospital. As SINA's president, Perez was instrumental in the foundation and implementation of the $110 million Learning Corridor complex.

== Term as mayor ==
In his first run for political office in 2001, Eddie Pérez made history as the first Hispanic American to become mayor of a New England capital. A native of Puerto Rico, Pérez also broke new political ground by forging a bipartisan coalition of community activists and corporate leaders that contributed to his landslide victory. Elected on a platform of administrative reform, educational improvement, and housing development, Pérez received seventy-five percent of the vote on election day. Pérez credited grassroots support for giving him the victory. He also pointed to the reinvigorated sense of citizenship that his campaign had generated in Hartford's Hispanic community. "There was no sense of building social, economic, and cultural capital as Americans, "he told the New York Times shortly after his election, "We have to begin to rebuild that foundation."

Perez, a Democrat, was re-elected in 2003 in a landslide victory and again in 2007. In 2007 an Editorial in the Hartford Courant credited Perez with helping to reform the Hartford public school system, reduce crime, increase the city's historically low homeownership rate, increase the number residents with access to high-speed internet and spark economic development.

Perez gained a reputation for pushing forward urban redevelopment in both the central business district and neighborhoods of the city. At the same time, he worked with grass-roots unions such as UNITE HERE to make sure jobs at new developments went to city residents. Mayor Perez resigned from the office following his conviction on corruption charges in 2010.

=== Corruption cases ===
Perez was arrested in 2009 and convicted in 2010 on charges related to a failed development deal and work done by a city contractor on his house. It was alleged that Perez took part in two separate corrupt schemes, in the first one he was accused of accepting bribes from a city contractor (primarily discounted home renovation) in return for protecting the contractor from the consequences of shoddy work they had done for the city. The second case involved attempted larceny by extortion; it was alleged that Perez tried to coerce a Hartford businessman into paying a bribe to a friendly politician. Even after his conviction Perez claimed that he was innocent and vowed to appeal the conviction. Some, at the time of the Perez investigation, wondered if there was a connection between the Governor's Chief of Staff, the Chief State's Attorney and the investigation of Perez, a political opponent of the Governor.

On December 9, 2013, a ruling the Connecticut Appellate Court vacated Perez's sentence. The court found the trial judge abused her discretion by trying two unrelated cases at the same time, which violated Perez's Constitutional right to a fair trial. However, they did not rule that he could not still be tried for both crimes separately. On July 14, 2016, the Connecticut Supreme Court upheld the December 2013 decision of the Connecticut Appellate Court overturning Pérez's conviction on charges of bribery, fabricating evidence, and conspiracy to fabricate evidence in connection with the failed development of a vacant site, and improvements to his home by a city contractor, and vacated his sentence.

After the Appellate Court decision Perez was re-indicted on the charges but this time split into two separate cases. In 2017 Perez pleaded guilty to avoid facing two lengthy and expensive trials with little chance of success (his previous conviction only being thrown out on a technicality). He pleaded guilty to receiving bribes related to the corrupt contractor case and criminal attempt to commit larceny in the first degree by extortion related to the extortion case. He was sentenced to an 8-year suspended prison sentence and given a conditional discharge.

In March 2019 Perez was stripped of his state pension because of the severity of his crimes. His legal team made the argument that while he had indeed committed the crimes in question there was no direct financial harm to the city, an argument which was disputed by the prosecution and found wanting by the Judge. The Judge stated that “The severity of the crimes, the self-dealing and disdain for the public good demonstrated by his conduct, as well as the high degree of public trust reposed in the defendant, outweigh any factors mitigating his crimes.”

== Activities since leaving office ==
Since leaving office Perez has served as a consultant for non-profits. In 2013, along with two partners, Perez opened an insurance firm on Park Street in Hartford. The firm closed soon thereafter.

Since 2015 he has been employed as a transportation coordinator for the Capitol Region Education Council with a salary of $47,034 per year.

=== 2019 mayoral run ===
On April 4, 2019, Perez announced he was once again running to be Mayor of Hartford. In his announcement speech at the Arch Street Tavern he took responsibility for his past misdeeds and addressed the voters saying "I ask for your forgiveness. I ask the city to give me a second chance."

Perez lost the Democratic primary to incumbent Bronin and unsuccessfully challenged Bronin in the general election as an independent.

Political offices
Preceded by Michael P. Peters	Mayor of Hartford; 2001–2010	Succeeded by Pedro Segarra
