= Mayor of Hartford, Connecticut =

Political office in the United States

- Incumbent; Arunan Arulampalam since January 1, 2024
- Type: Mayor
- Formation: June 18, 1774
- First holder: Thomas Seymour

The following table lists the individuals who served as mayor of Hartford, Connecticut, their political party affiliations, and their dates in office, as well as other information.

== History ==
The city of Hartford switched from a mayor–council government to a council–manager government in 1947. The mayor was chosen from among the city council until 1969, when the mayor began to be directly elected in partisan elections.

In the 1990s and early 2000s, there were three unsuccessful efforts to amend to city charter to switch from a "weak mayor" system to a "strong mayor" system. Advocates for reform argued a switch to a strong-mayor system would "ameliorate the sense of citizen frustration with the Hartford government and the many problems facing the city," such as a significant drop in the city's population (11.1% from 1990 to 1994, the largest drop for a large U.S. city), crime, a broken school system (which had been taken over by the state), an overstaffed and costly fire department, and a scandal-ridden police department, as well as lackluster economic development. Under the system then in place, the mayor had no vote in the city council, and had only the power to veto council legislation. The city council was also solely responsible for hiring or firing the city manager, with the mayor having no formal role. The mayor also lacked effective executive power; it was the city manager who appointed and supervised department heads. The mayor could only hire and fire his own secretary. Moreover, the mayor's salary was very low, $30,000, which discouraged qualified candidates from running. Because of this system, the mayor's influence was based solely on his "ability to cobble together a council coalition," and the mayor's functions were mostly those of "a policy advocate rather than a player in policy implementation."

in 2000, proposed charter revisions written by a Charter Revision Commission would have eliminated the city manager, made the mayor the chief executive of the city, increase the mayor's salary from $30,000 to $105,000, increased the size of the city council (from nine to fifteen), and switched to elections of council members by ward rather than at-large. The proposed charter revisions were put to a vote in a city special election; the majority of voters supported the revisions, but the revision fell short of the required 15% of all registered voters, and so the proposal failed.

In January 2002, shortly after taking office, mayor Eddie A. Perez—an advocate for a strong-mayor government—formed a new fifteen-member Charter Review Commission to review the charter and recommend changes. The commission recommended several changes, many of which had been recommended by the previous commission. The revision proposed shifted to a strong-mayor system in which the mayor would serve as chief executive officer and chief operating officer of the city, appoint a majority of the board of education, appoint all department heads, remove department heads (with the approval of six council members), and prepare and present the annual city budget to the council. On November 5, 2002, the revisions went to a city vote, and all were approved, with about 77% of voters approving the changes, effective with the 2003 election.

== List of mayors ==
The following table lists the individuals who served as mayor of Hartford, Connecticut.

| # | Name | Party | Served | Notes |
|---|---|---|---|---|
| 1 | Thomas Seymour | Federalist | June 18, 1774 – May 28, 1812 | Resigned |
| 2 | Chauncey Goodrich | Federalist | June 8, 1812 – September 9, 1815 | Died in office; Served simultaneously as Lieutenant Governor of Connecticut |
| 3 | Jonathan Brace | Federalist | September 9, 1815 – November 22, 1824 | |
| 4 | Nathaniel Terry | Whig | November 22, 1824 – March 28, 1831 | |
| 5 | Thomas Scott Williams | Whig | March 28, 1831 – April 27, 1835 | |
| 6 | Henry Leavitt Ellsworth | Democratic | April 27, 1835 – June 15, 1835 | Resigned |
| 7 | Jared Griswold | Whig | June 15, 1835 – November 22, 1835 | Died in office |
| 8 | Jeremy Hoadley | Whig | November 23, 1835 – April 18, 1836 | |
| 9 | Henry Hudson | Whig | April 18, 1836 – April 20, 1840 | |
| 10 | Thomas Kimberly Brace | Whig | April 20, 1840 – April 17, 1843 | Resigned |
| 11 | Amos M. Collins | Democratic | April 17, 1843 – April 19, 1847 | |
| 12 | Philip Ripley | Democratic | April 19, 1847 – April 21, 1851 | |
| 13 | Ebenezer Flower | Democratic | April 21, 1851 – April 18, 1853 | |
| 14 | William Jas. Hamersley | Democratic | April 18, 1853 – April 17, 1854 | |
| 15 | Henry C. Deming | Democratic | April 17, 1854 – April 12, 1858 | |
| 16 | Timothy M. Allyn | Republican | April 12, 1858 – April 8, 1860 | |
| 17 | Henry C. Deming | Democratic | April 9, 1860 – February 27, 1862 | Resigned |
| 18 | Charles S. Benton | Democratic | February 10, 1852 – April 14, 1862 | Elected by Common Council |
| 19 | William Jas. Hamersley | Democratic | April 14, 1862 – April 11, 1864 | |
| 20 | Allyn S. Stillman | Republican | April 11, 1864 – April 9, 1866 | |
| 21 | Charles R. Chapman | Democratic | April 9, 1866 – April 1, 1872 | |
| 22 | Henry C. Robinson | Republican | April 1, 1872 – April 6, 1874 | |
| 23 | Joseph H. Sprague | Democratic | April 6, 1874 – April 1, 1878 | |
| 24 | George G. Sumner | Democratic | April 1, 1878 – April 5, 1880 | |
| 25 | Morgan Bulkeley | Republican | April 5, 1880– April 2, 1888 | |
| 26 | John G. Root | Republican | April 2, 1888 – April 7, 1890 | |
| 27 | Henry C. Dwight | Republican | April 7, 1890 – April 4, 1892 | |
| 28 | William Waldo Hyde | Democratic | April 4, 1892 – April 2, 1894 | |
| 29 | Leveret Brainard | Republican | April 2, 1894 – April 6, 1896 | |
| 30 | Miles B. Preston | Democratic | April 6, 1896 – April 2, 1900 | |
| 31 | Alexander Harbison | Republican | April 2, 1900 – April 7, 1902 | |
| 32 | Ignatius A. Sullivan | Democratic | April 7, 1902 – April 4, 1904 | |
| 33 | William F. Henney | Republican | April 4, 1904 – April 7, 1908 | |
| 34 | Edward W. Hooker | Republican | April 7, 1908 – April 5, 1910 | |
| 35 | Edward L. Smith | Democratic | April 5, 1910 – April 2, 1912 | |
| 36 | Louis R. Cheney | Republican | April 2, 1912 – April 7, 1914 | |
| 37 | Joseph H. Lawler | Democratic | April 7, 1914 – April 4, 1916 | |
| 38 | Frank A. Hagarty | Republican | April 7, 1916 – April 7, 1918 | |
| 39 | Richard J. Kinsella | Democratic | April 2, 1918 – April 4, 1920 | |
| 40 | Newton C. Brainard | Republican | April 6, 1920 – May 2, 1922 | |
| 41 | Richard J. Kinsella | Democratic | April 4, 1922 – April 6, 1924 | |
| 42 | Norman C. Stevens | Republican | April 1, 1924 – May 1, 1928 | |
| 43 | Walter E. Batterson | Republican | April 3, 1928 – December 1, 1931 | |
| 44 | William J. Rankin | Democratic | November 3, 1931 – December 4, 1933 | |
| 45 | Joseph W. Beach | Republican | November 7, 1933 – December 3, 1935 | |
| 46 | John A. Pilgard | Democratic | November 5, 1935 – November 14, 1935 | Died before taking oath of office |
| 47 | Thomas J. Spellacy | Democratic | December 3, 1935 – June 18, 1943 | Elected to first term by Common Council; resigned in fourth term. |
| 48 | Dennis P. O'Connor | Democratic | June 24, 1943 – December 7, 1943 | Elected by Common Council |
| 49 | William H. Mortensen | Republican | December 7, 1943 – December 4, 1945 | |
| 50 | Cornelius A. Moylan | Republican | December 4, 1945 – December 24, 1946 | Died in office |
| 51 | Edward N. Allen | Republican | January 3, 1947 – January 6, 1948 | Elected by Common Council |
| 52 | Cyril Coleman | Democratic | January 6, 1948 – December 4, 1951 | |
| 53 | Joseph V. Cronin | Democratic | December 4, 1951 – December 1, 1953 | |
| 54 | Dominick J. DeLucco | Democratic | 1953–1955 | |
| 55 | Joseph V. Cronin | Democratic | 1955–1957 | |
| 56 | James H. Kinsella | Democratic | 1957–1960 | |
| 57 | Dominick J. DeLucco | Democratic | November 14, 1960 – December 5, 1961 | Deputy mayor, succeeded to office |
| 58 | William E. Glynn | Democratic | December 5, 1961 – December 7, 1965 | |
| 59 | George B. Kinsella | Democratic | December 7, 1965 – December 5, 1967 | |
| 60 | Antonina Uccello | Republican | December 5, 1967 – April 12, 1971 | Resigned to take U.S. Department of Transportation post; City's first female mayor; first female mayor of a state capital |
| 61 | George A. Athanson | Democratic | April 12, 1971 – December 1, 1981 | Deputy mayor, succeeded to office |
| 62 | Thirman L. Milner | Democratic | December 1, 1981 – December 1, 1987 | City's first black mayor, and first black elected mayor in New England |
| 63 | Carrie Saxon Perry | Democratic | December 1, 1987 – December 7, 1993 | City's first black female mayor, and first black female elected mayor of a major Northeastern city |
| 64 | Michael P. Peters | Democratic | December 7, 1993 – December 4, 2001 | |
| 65 | Eddie A. Perez | Democratic | December 4, 2001 – June 26, 2010 | Resigned after being convicted on corruption charges City's first Hispanic mayor |
| 66 | Pedro Segarra | Democratic | June 26, 2010 – December 31, 2015 | City Council president, succeeded Perez; city's first openly gay mayor |
| 67 | Luke Bronin | Democratic | January 1, 2016 – December 31, 2023 | |
| 68 | Arunan Arulampalam | Democratic | January 1, 2024–present | City's first Asian American mayor |

== See also ==
- Mayoral elections in Hartford, Connecticut
