= Frog Hollow, Hartford, Connecticut =

Historic district in Connecticut, US

- Frog Hollow
- U.S. National Register of Historic Places
- U.S. Historic district
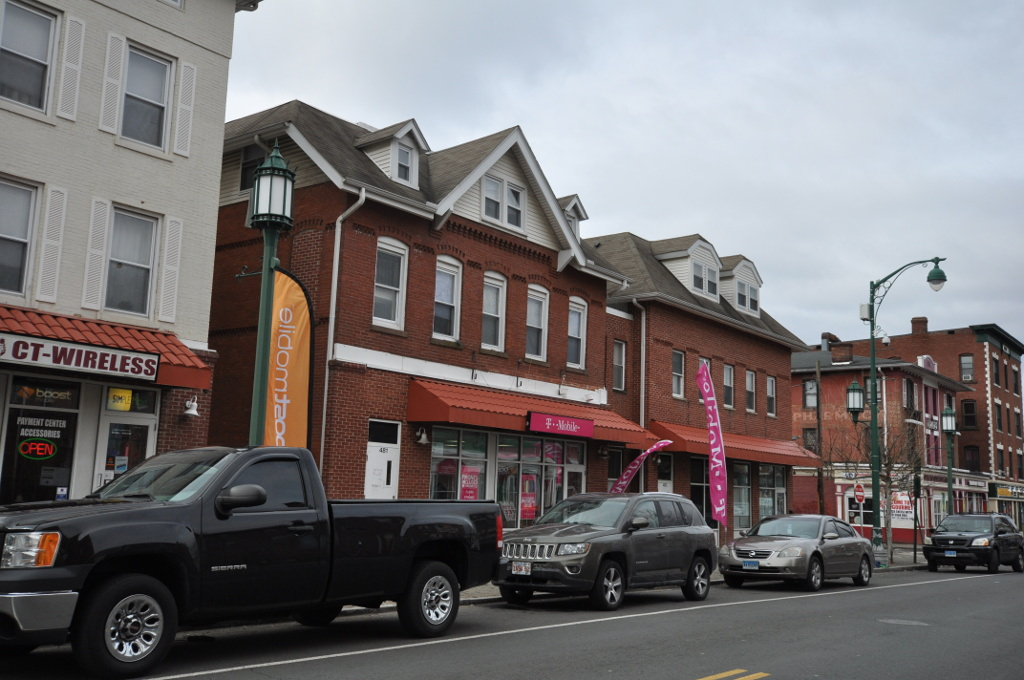

- Location within Connecticut Location within the United States
- Location: Roughly bounded by Park River, Capitol Ave., Oak, Washington, and Madison Sts. and Park Ter., Hartford, Connecticut
- Coordinates: 41°45′22.08″N 72°41′13.51″W
- Area: 159 acres (64 ha) (original size); 9 acres (3.6 ha) (size of 1984 increase)
- Built: 1850
- Architect: George Keller, et al.
- Architectural style: Queen Anne, Italianate, Greek Revival
- NRHP reference No.: 79002635 (original); 84001005 (increase)

Significant dates
- Added to NRHP: April 11, 1979
- Boundary increase: March 1, 1984

Frog Hollow is one of the neighborhoods of Hartford, Connecticut. It is a predominantly residential area, bounded on the north by Capitol Avenue, the east by Lafayette Street, the south by Madison and Hamilton Streets, and on the west by Interstate 84. The neighborhood was developed between about 1850 and 1930, and still contains a remarkable concentration of residential housing from that period. The entire neighborhood, covering more than 150 acres (61 ha) and including more than 900 buildings, is listed on the National Register of Historic Places.

== Description ==
Frog Hollow takes its name from the marshy conditions in the low land near what is now the corner of Broad and Ward streets. Most of the area was farmland until 1852 when the Sharps Rifle Manufacturing Company constructed a factory, beginning the area's transformation into a major industrial area. Although not the first factory to be situated along now-buried Park River, Sharps located there specifically to take advantage of the railroad line that had been constructed along the river in 1838. After the Sharps Rifle Company failed in 1870, the Weed Sewing Machine Company took over its factory and soon surpassed the Colt Armory in nearby Coltsville in size.

Inspired by a British-made, high-wheel bicycle, or velocipede, he saw at the 1876 Philadelphia Centennial Exposition, industrialist Albert Pope bought patent rights for bicycle production in the United States. Wanting to contract out his first order, however, Pope approached George Fairfield of Hartford, and the Weed Sewing Machine Company produced Pope's first run of bicycles in 1878. Bicycles proved to be a huge commercial success and production in the Weed factory expanded, with Weed making every part but the tires, and by 1890, demand for bicycles overshadowed the failing sewing machine market. That year, Pope bought the Weed factory, took over as its president, and renamed it the Pope Manufacturing Company.

The bicycle boom was short-lived, peaking near the turn of the century when more and more consumers craved individual automobile travel, and Pope's company suffered financially from over-production amidst falling demand. In an effort to save his business, Pope opened a Motor Carriage Department and turned out electric carriages, beginning with the "Mark III" in 1897. Pope's venture might have made Hartford the capital of the automobile industry were it not for the ascendency of Henry Ford and a series of pitfalls and patent struggles that outlived Pope himself.

After his business failed, Pope donated a 75-acre (300,000 m^{2}) parcel park to provide recreational facilities for neighborhood families. Today, the park provides recreational facilities for neighborhood families.

Park Street has also been called "New England's Spanish Main Street" because of the predominantly Puerto Rican population and merchants. Former Hartford Mayor Eddie Perez hoped to attract new merchants looking to expand their businesses into Hartford and in 2005, plans were first floated to spend $64 million on a project at the intersection of Park Street and Main Street. Original plans included two luxury condo towers, some retail, and a massive main square—or Plaza Mayor, as it came to be known. The plan later got smaller in size, and was eventually shelved entirely during the Great Recession.

The neighborhood is home to Hartford Superior Court, Hartford Community Court, Family Court, Trinity College, The Learning Corridor, The Lyceum Resource and Conference Center, Broad Street Juvenile Court, Hartford Hospital, and Connecticut Children's Medical Center.

Residential construction in Frog Hollow began around 1850, with the construction of Greek Revival houses along Grand Street, and continued with Italianate houses, including a number of duplexes, along Affleck Street. The major building boom in the area took place between 1890 and 1910, when houses, schools, churches, and commercial properties were developed in large numbers. Much of this housing was multi-unit housing, with a locally distinctive "perfect six" wood-frame building, three stories in height with two units per story, coming to typify the housing built at that time. A significant number of triple deckers (one unit per floor) were also built.

== See also ==
- National Register of Historic Places listings in Hartford, Connecticut
