= Neighborhoods of Hartford, Connecticut =

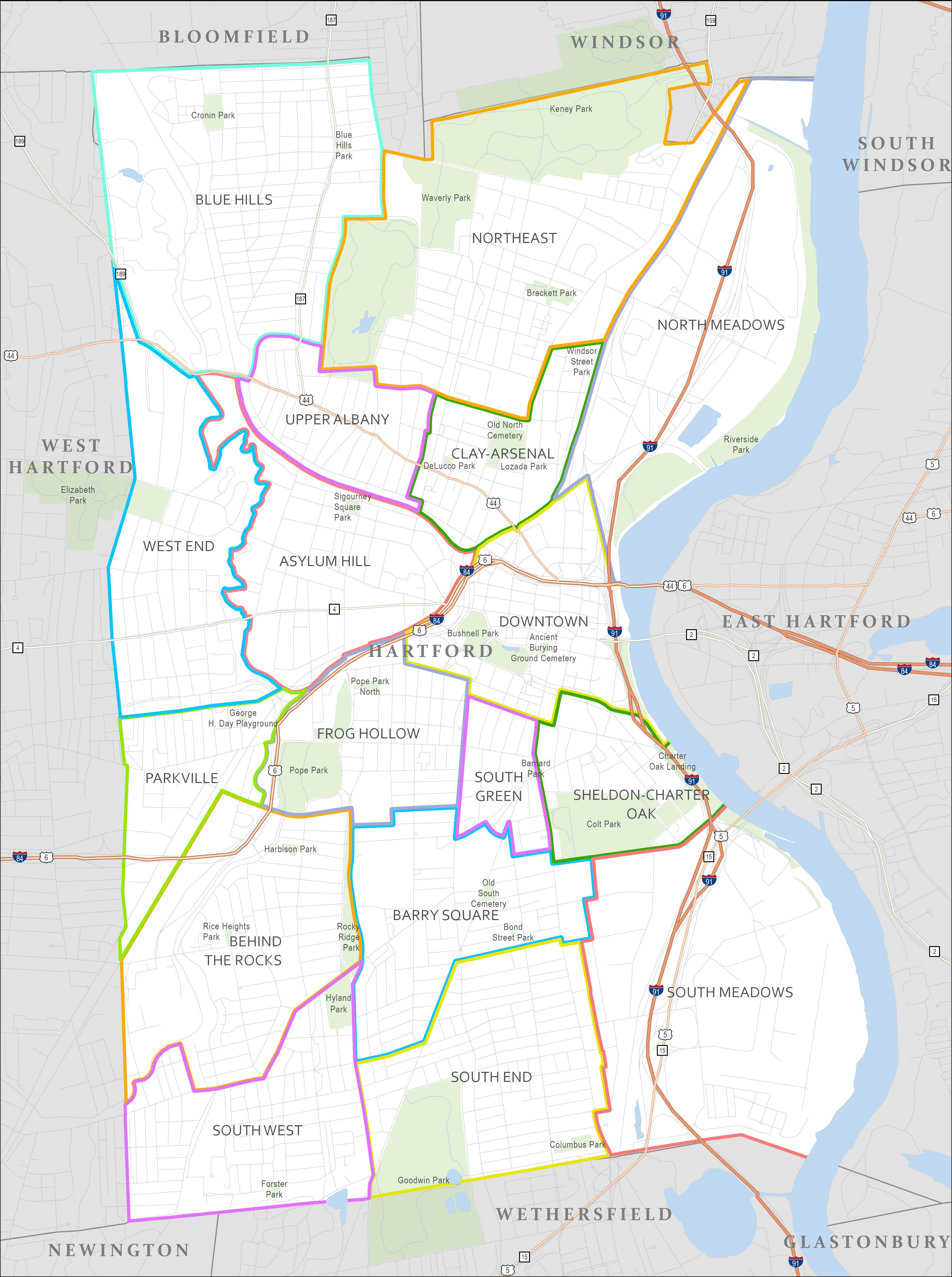
A map of the neighborhoods of Hartford

The neighborhoods of Hartford, Connecticut in the United States are varied and historic.

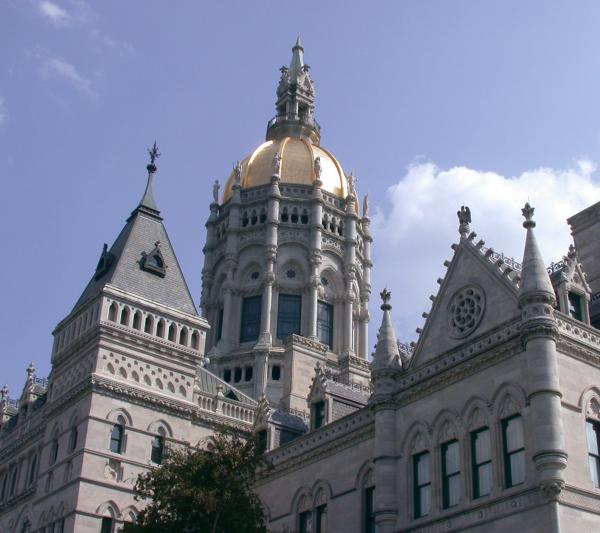
The Connecticut State Capitol in downtown Hartford

== Central Business District/Downtown ==
Downtown is Hartford's primary business district. It is the location of the city government offices as well as the State Capitol.

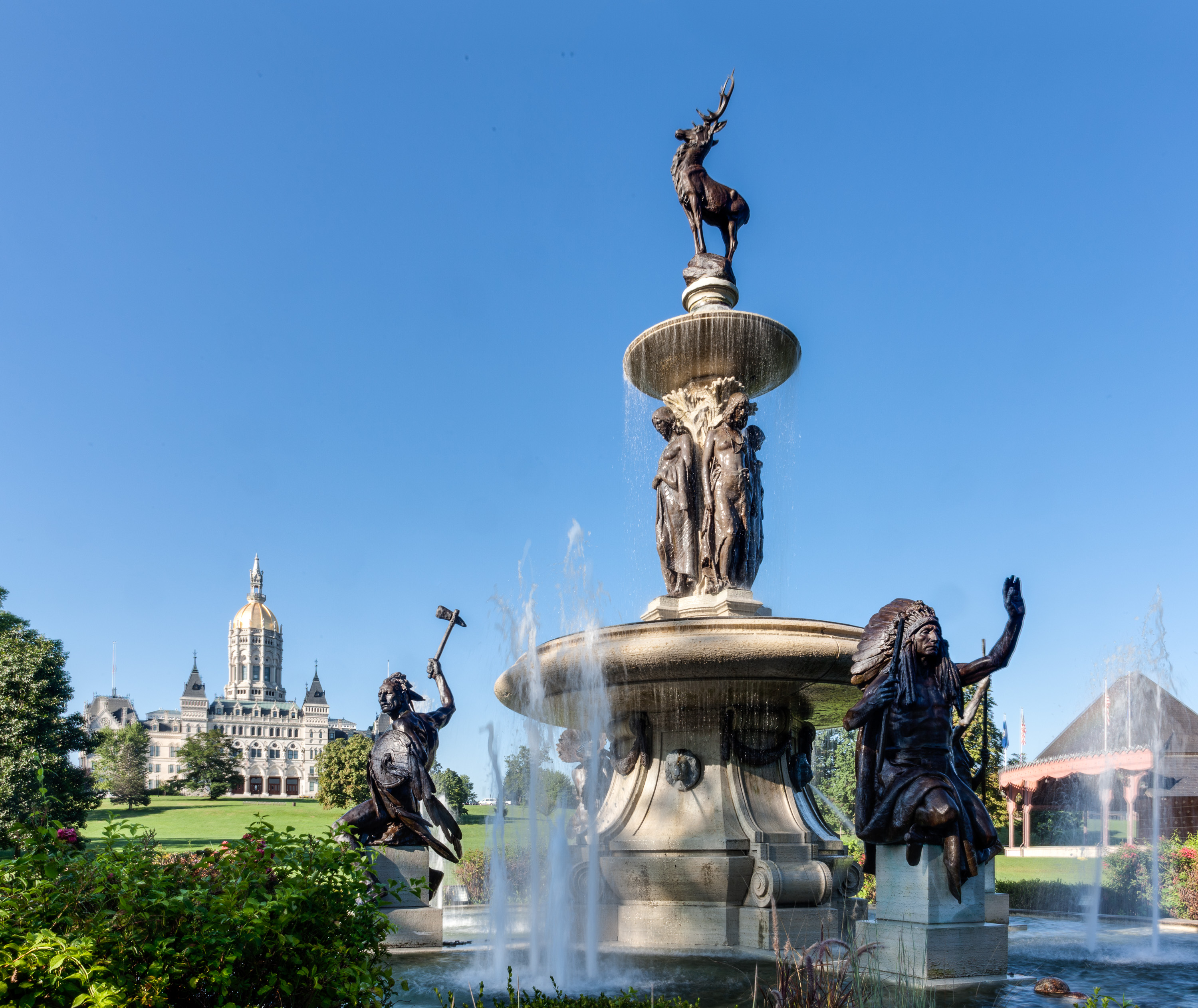
Corning Fountain, with the Connecticut State Capitol behind

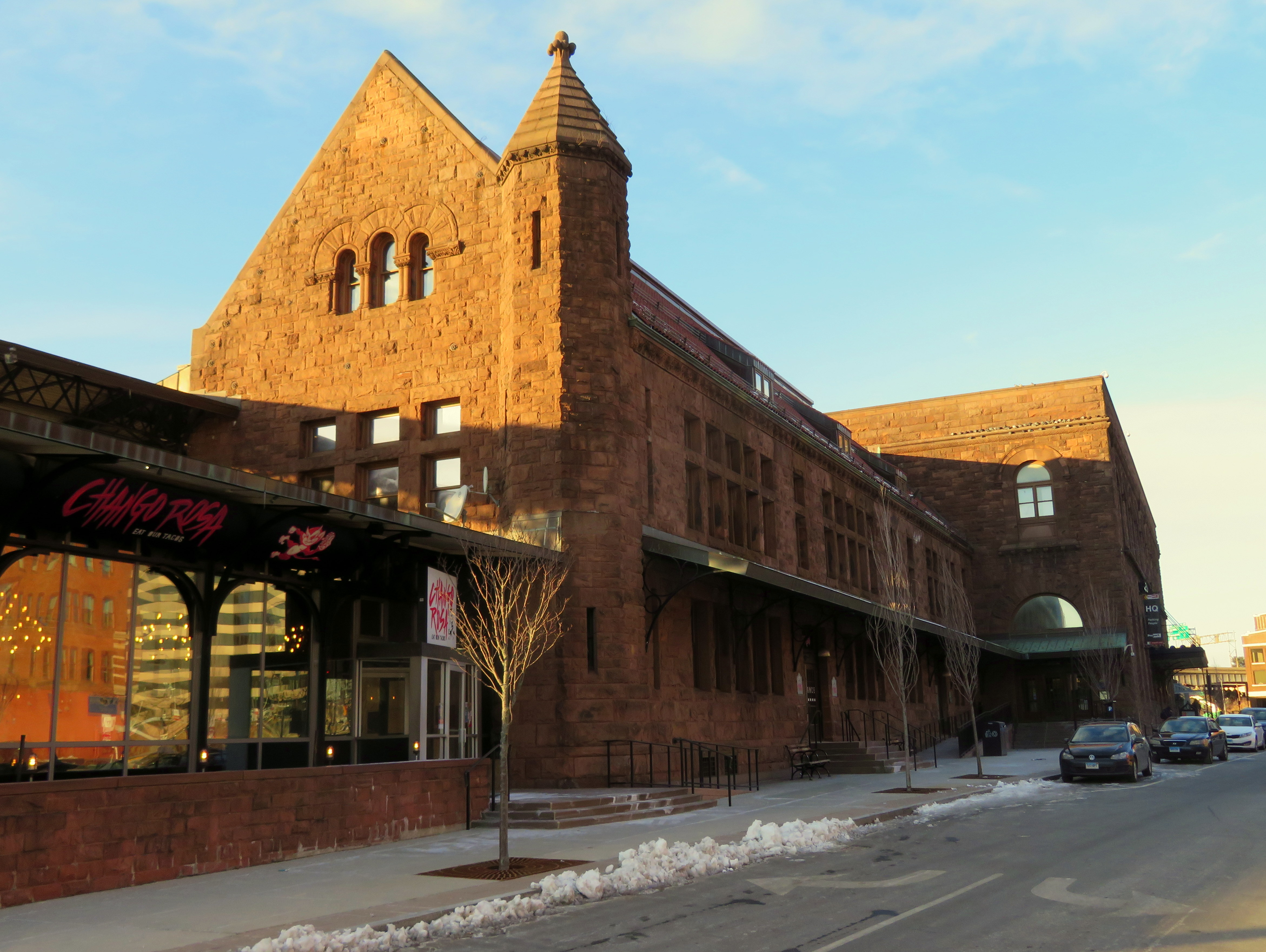
Hartford Union Station

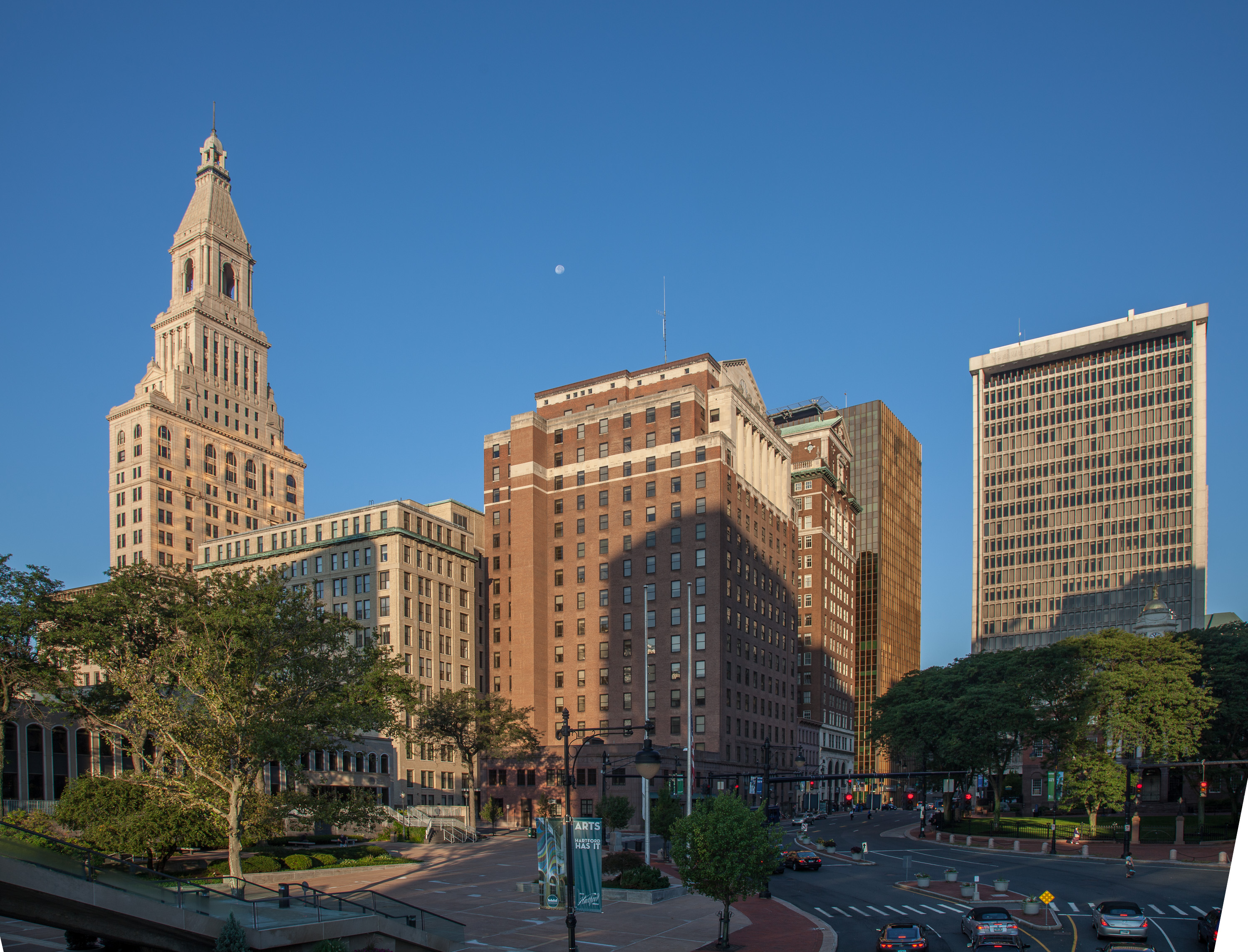
Central Row, with Travelers Tower on the left

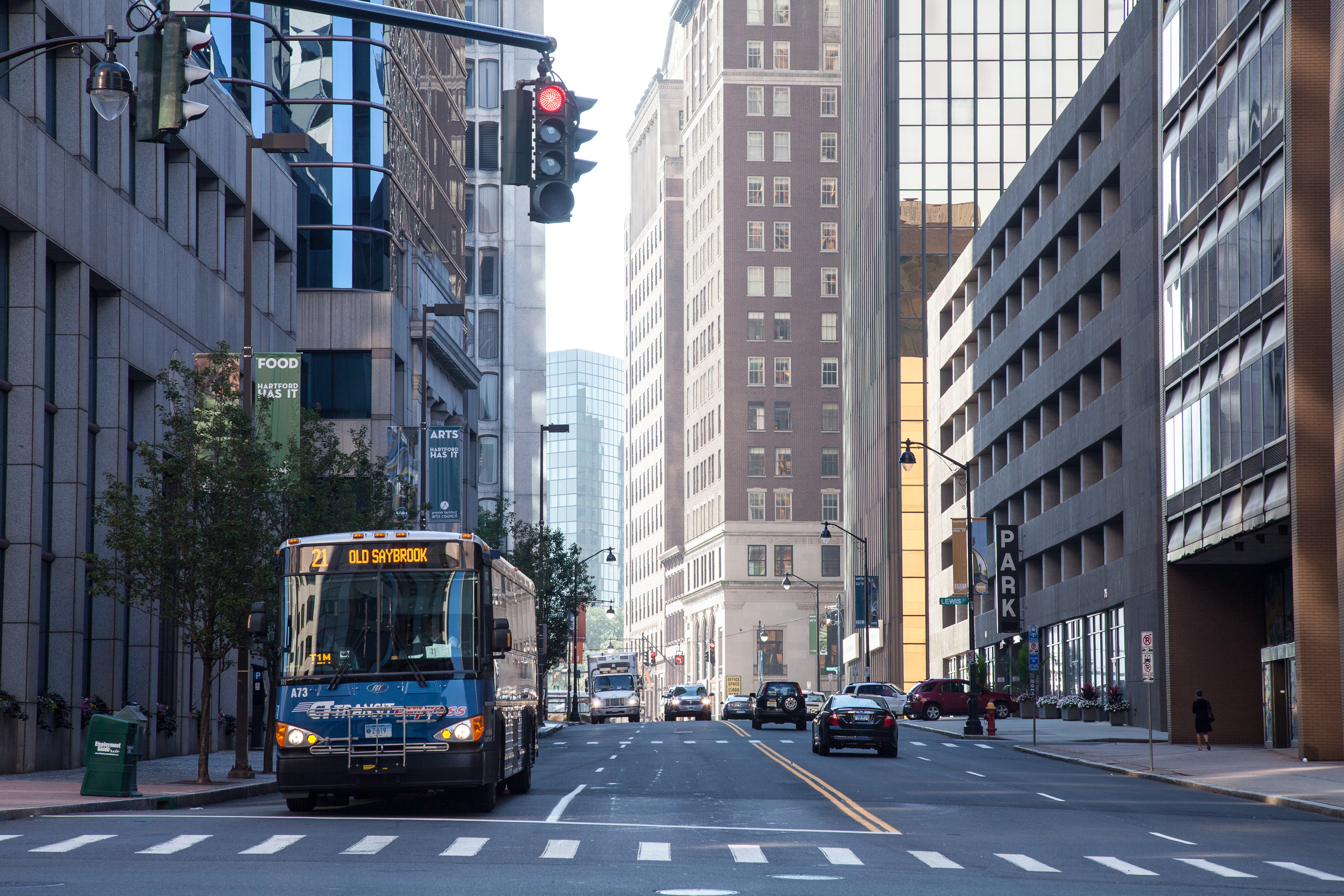
A typical downtown scene on Pearl Street

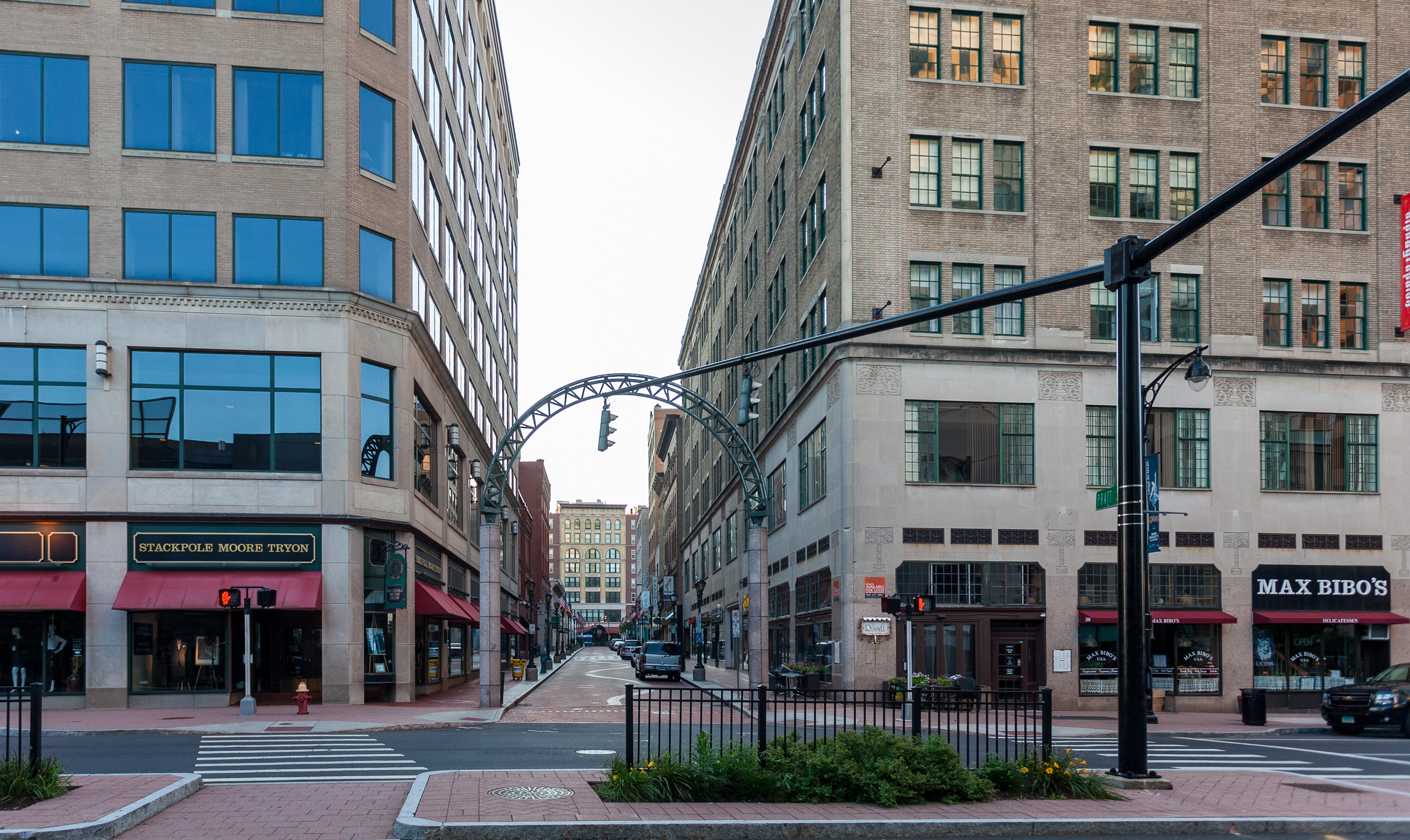
The entrance to Pratt Street, a pedestrian area with shops

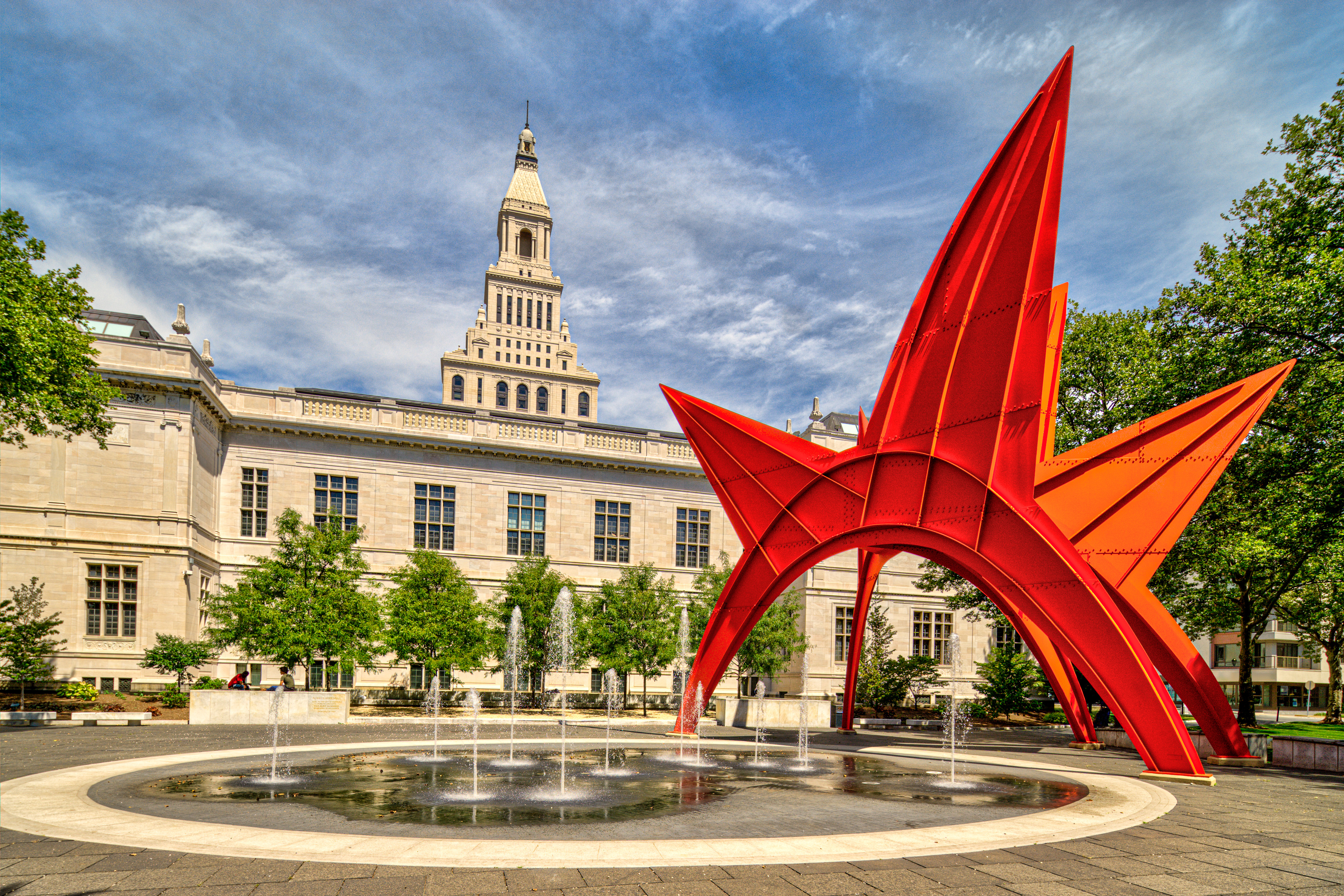
Burr Mall, facing the stegosaurus sculpture, and a building of the Wadsworth Atheneum

== Parkville ==
Parkville is a mixed industrial-residential area on Hartford's west side, and was one of the last parts of the city to be developed. Parkville is bounded by Capitol Avenue, Interstate 84, and New Park Avenue.

Although the modern city of Hartford was founded in 1636, farms only began to be established in the Parkville area after 1750. In the 1870s large-scale industrial development began in Parkville as a shortage of construction materials affected the rest of the city, with its new industry later promoting the expansion of the neighborhood's residential areas. A brickyard was established in 1873, and a rubber works began operation in 1881. Despite increasing industrialization, in 1878 residents of Parkville unsuccessfully attempted to secede from the rest of Hartford, with some claiming they were too highly taxed for how little-developed their neighborhood was, especially when compared to others nearby such as Frog Hollow. As late as 1909, northern areas of Parkville remained largely vacant, with one section of Capitol Avenue between Arbor Street and Sisson Avenue containing only two houses. From continued industrial growth in the early-20th century however, the same area was entirely developed by 1912.

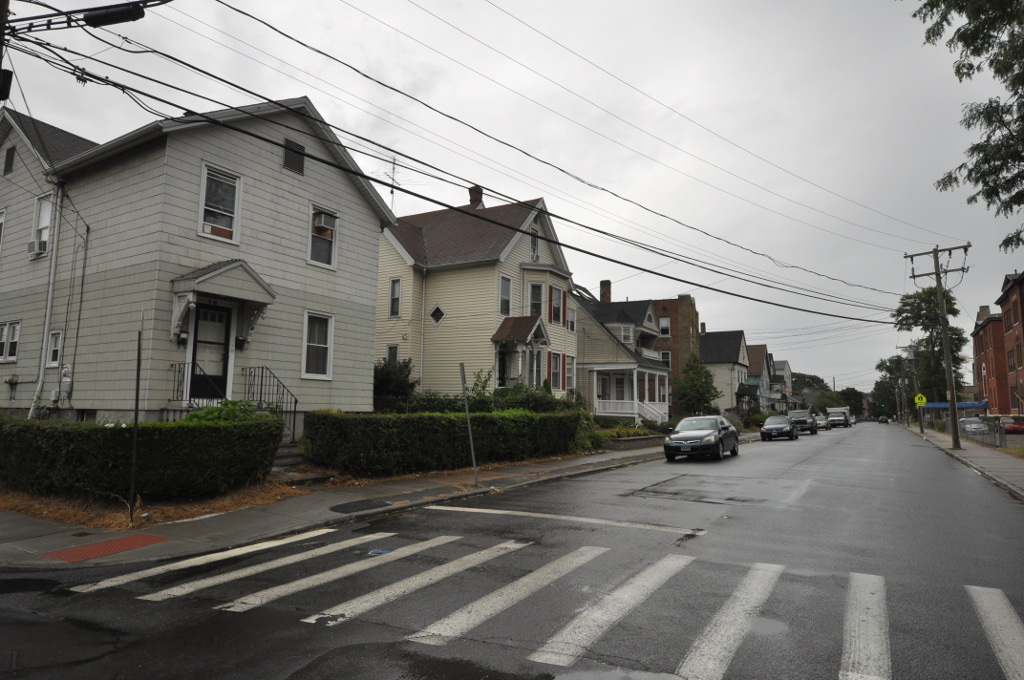
A typical street scene in Parkville

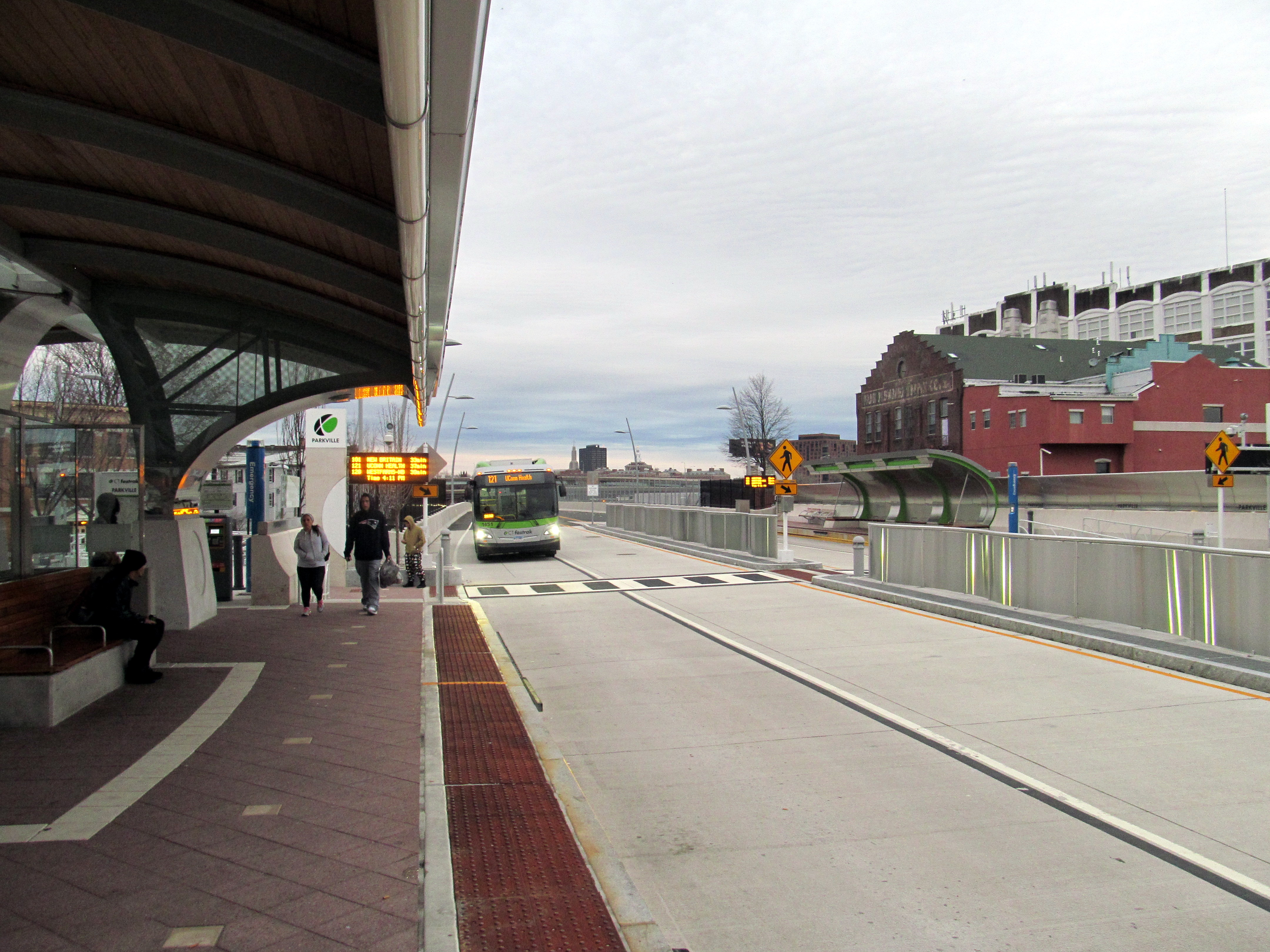
Parkville station along the CT Fastrak busway

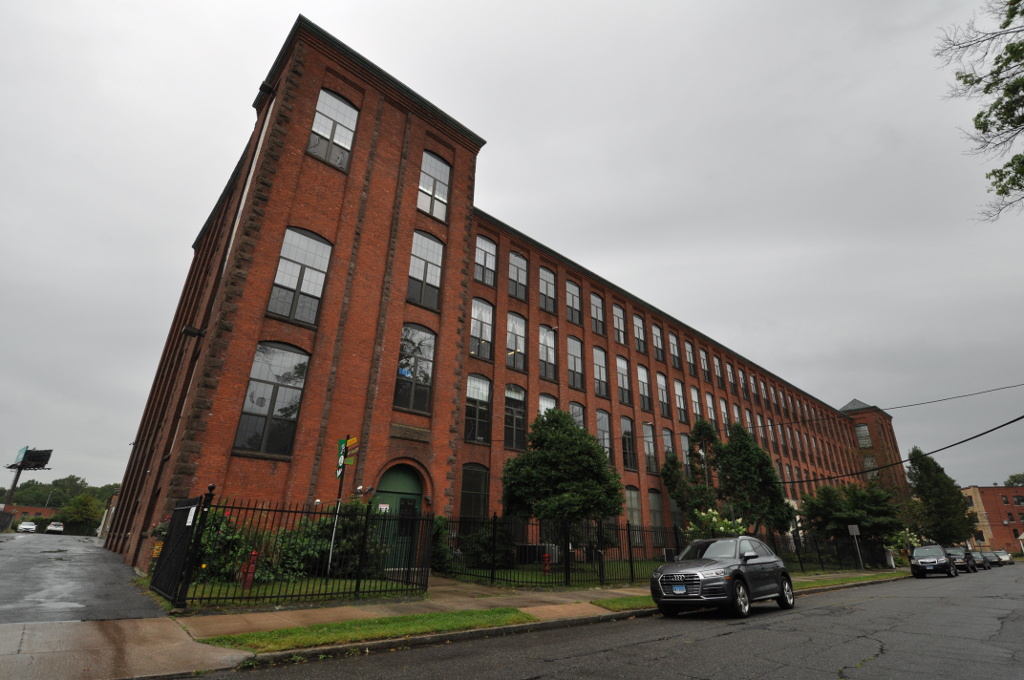
The historic Underwood Computing Machine Company Factory in Parkville

== Frog Hollow ==
Frog Hollow stretches along Capitol Avenue directly west of the State Capitol until Laurel Street, and south towards Trinity College. The area takes its name from the marshy conditions in the low land near what is now the corner of Broad and Ward streets.

Most of the area was farmland until 1852 when the Sharps Rifle Manufacturing Company constructed a factory, beginning the area's transformation into a major industrial area. Although not the first factory to be situated along now-buried Park River, Sharps located there specifically to take advantage of the railroad line that had been constructed along the river in 1838. After the Sharps Rifle Company failed in 1870, the Weed Sewing Machine Company took over its factory and soon surpassed the Colt Armory in nearby Coltsville in size.

Inspired by a British-made, high-wheel bicycle, or velocipede, he saw at the 1876 Philadelphia Centennial Exposition, industrialist Albert Pope bought patent rights for bicycle production in the United States. Wanting to contract out his first order, however, Pope approached George Fairfield of Hartford, and the Weed Sewing Machine Company produced Pope's first run of bicycles in 1878. Bicycles proved to be a huge commercial success and production in the Weed factory expanded, with Weed making every part but the tires, and by 1890, demand for bicycles overshadowed the failing sewing machine market. That year, Pope bought the Weed factory, took over as its president, and renamed it the Pope Manufacturing Company.

The bicycle boom was short-lived, peaking near the turn of the century when more and more consumers craved individual automobile travel, and Pope's company suffered financially from over-production amidst falling demand. In an effort to save his business, Pope opened a Motor Carriage Department and turned out electric carriages, beginning with the "Mark III" in 1897. Pope's venture might have made Hartford the capital of the automobile industry were it not for the ascendency of Henry Ford and a series of pitfalls and patent struggles that outlived Pope himself.

After his business failed, Pope donated a 75-acre (300,000 m^{2}) parcel park provides recreational facilities for neighborhood families. Today, the park provides recreational facilities for neighborhood families.

Park Street has also been called "New England's Spanish Main Street" because of the predominantly Puerto Rican population and merchants. Former Hartford Mayor Eddie Perez hoped to attract new merchants looking to expand their businesses into Hartford and in 2005, plans were first floated to spend $64 million on a project at the intersection of Park Street and Main Street. Original plans included two luxury condo towers, some retail, and a massive main square—or Plaza Mayor, as it came to be known. The plan later got smaller in size, and was eventually shelved entirely during the Great Recession.

The neighborhood is home to Hartford Superior Court, Hartford Community Court, Family Court, Trinity College, The Learning Corridor, The Lyceum Resource and Conference Center, and Broad Street Juvenile Court.

== Asylum Hill ==
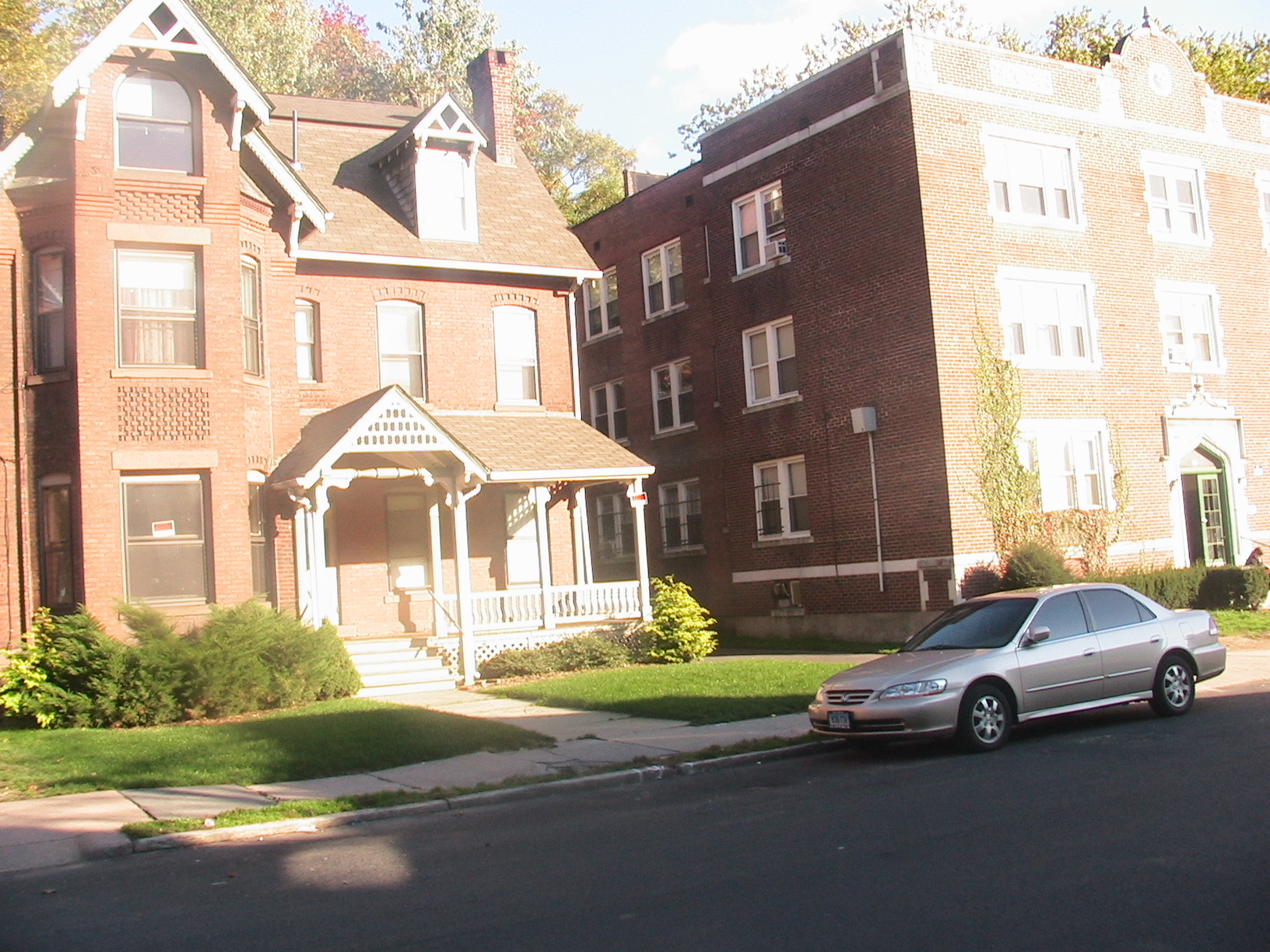
Asylum Hill

Asylum Hill is a 615-acre (2.49 km^{2}) centrally located Hartford neighborhood with about 10,500 residents. It rises uphill directly west of Downtown Hartford but is mostly flat until it slopes downward at its western edge, along the flood plain of the north branch of the now-buried Park River. Aside from the river, it is bound on its other three sides by railroad tracks and I-84.

Originally known as 'Lords Hill', the area was primarily farmland and named after one of the city's original settlers. In the early 1800s, the area was dominated by the 100-acre (0.40 km^{2}) Imlay farm, which occupied most of the land from present-day Imlay Street west to the north branch of the Park River, and from Farmington Avenue south to the Park River.

In 1807 the Asylum for the Education and Instruction of Deaf and Dumb Persons was founded here and its first student, Alice Cogswell, was enrolled. She is depicted in a commemorative statue, designed by Frances Wadsworth, that honors Thomas Hopkins Gallaudet, Mason F. Cogswell and Laurent Clerc, founders of the American School for the Deaf, which was the first of its kind in the country. It remained at its original location for 100 years. The area became known as Asylum Hill.

John Hooker and Francis Gillette purchased the farm in 1853 for the purpose of developing the real estate into smaller holdings. They built their own homes and encouraged friends to do the same. As a result, a literary colony developed that included Isabella Beecher Hooker, the Gillettes, Charles Dudley Warner, Harriet Beecher Stowe, Mark Twain, and other reformers and activists. The area became known as Nook Farm, taking its name from the bend‚ or “nook‚” in the Park River‚ which bordered the area.

Some houses of this colony still survive. Most notably, the home of Samuel Clemens who wrote under the pseudonym Mark Twain. He created some of his most notable works, including The Adventures of Tom Sawyer and A Connecticut Yankee in King Arthur's Court, while living in Hartford. These houses, along with the Katherine Day House, are preserved as museums open to the public. By the early 1900s Asylum Hill had become an established residential area, with spacious Victorian-style homes.

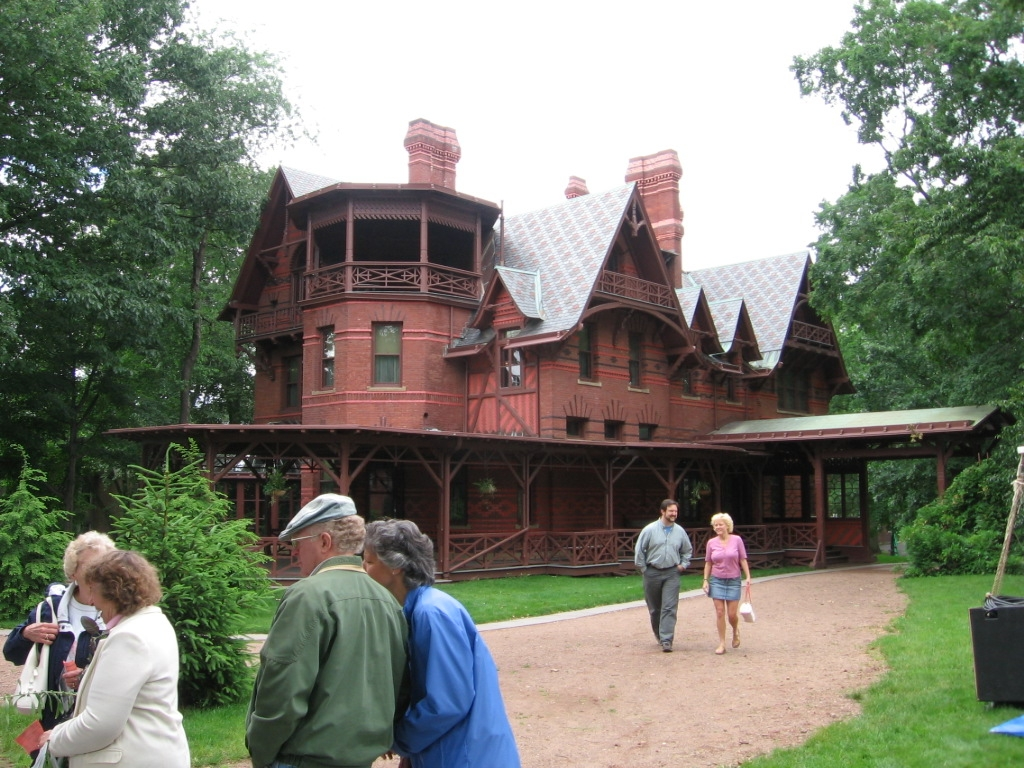
Mark Twain House

Beginning in the 1920s, major insurance companies began moving from downtown to Asylum Hill and would bring major change with office development. The Hartford was the first major corporation to move into the neighborhood, followed by the Rossia Insurance Company (now Northeastern Insurance Company) and Aetna. To make room for corporate headquarters, employee parking and housing, blocks of single family homes were gradually replaced by apartment buildings with small one-bedroom and efficiency apartments. Aetna remains as a major fixture along Farmington Avenue and recently moved more than 3,400 of their Middletown employees to its Hartford campus.

With many dating from the 19th-century residential period, a number of significant religious institutions are located in the neighborhood, including the Asylum Hill Congregational Church (1864) (where Mark Twain's good friend Joseph Twichell was minister for nearly 50 years) and the Trinity Episcopal Church (1890s). The modernist Cathedral of St. Joseph, was constructed in the mid-20th century and dedicated in 1962. Asylum Hill also was home to many educational institutions. The original Hartford Public High School was designed by architect George Keller. It was demolished in 1963 to make way for construction of Interstate 84.

Saint Francis Hospital was established in 1897 by the Sisters of Saint Joseph of Chambéry. The 617-bed acute care hospital is located on Woodland Street and is the largest Catholic hospital in New England.

In March 2006, the Connecticut Culinary Institute, which was recently renamed the Lincoln Culinary Institute, opened a branch in the former Hastings Hotel and Conference Center next to the world headquarters of Aetna. The Hastings was primarily a business hotel; President Bill Clinton stayed here when he visited the city while he was in office. The hotel closed abruptly in 2003, but reopened as the Lincoln Education Center. In late 2016, the Lincoln Culinary Institute announced that it was closing.

== West End ==
West End

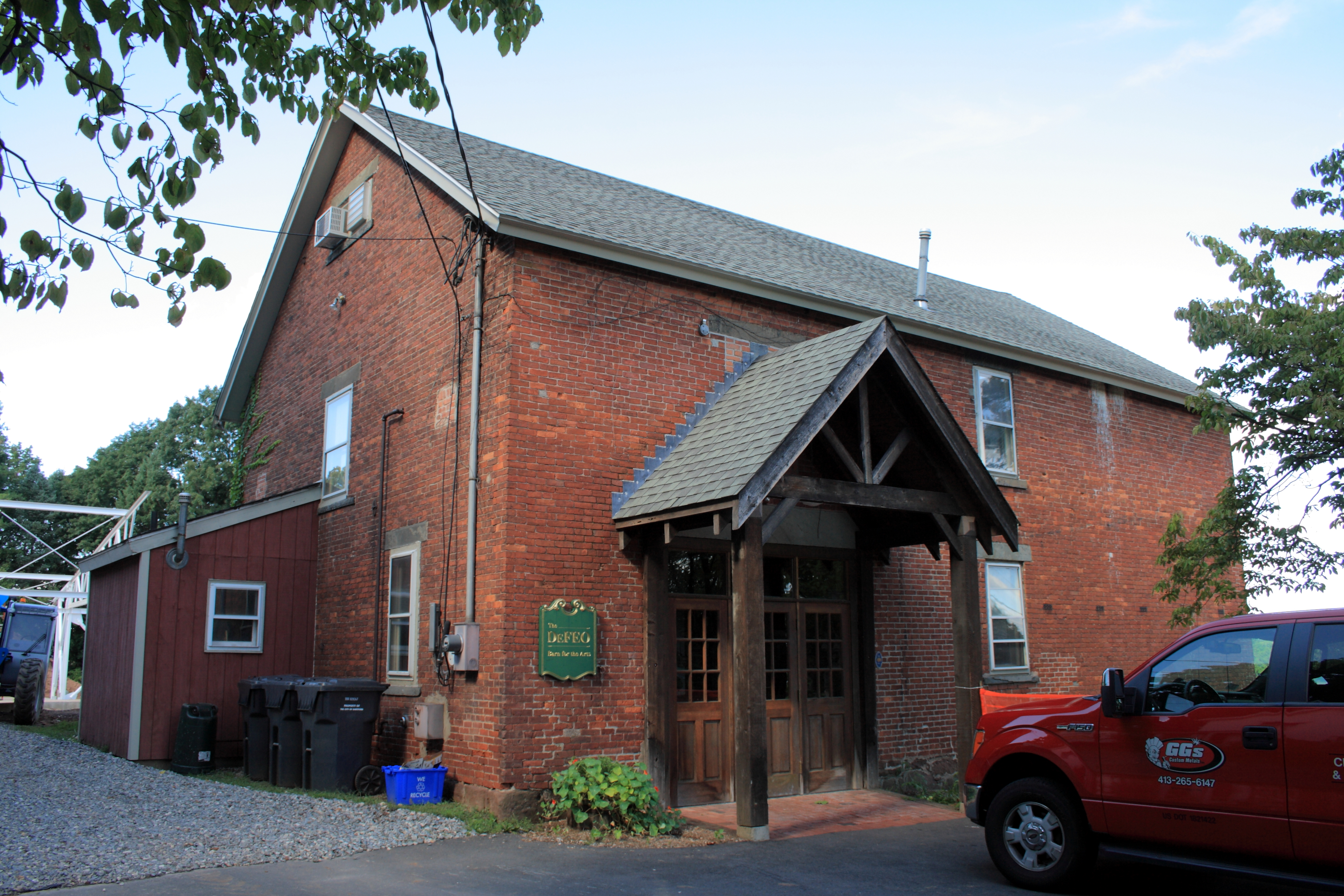
Watkinson School art barn

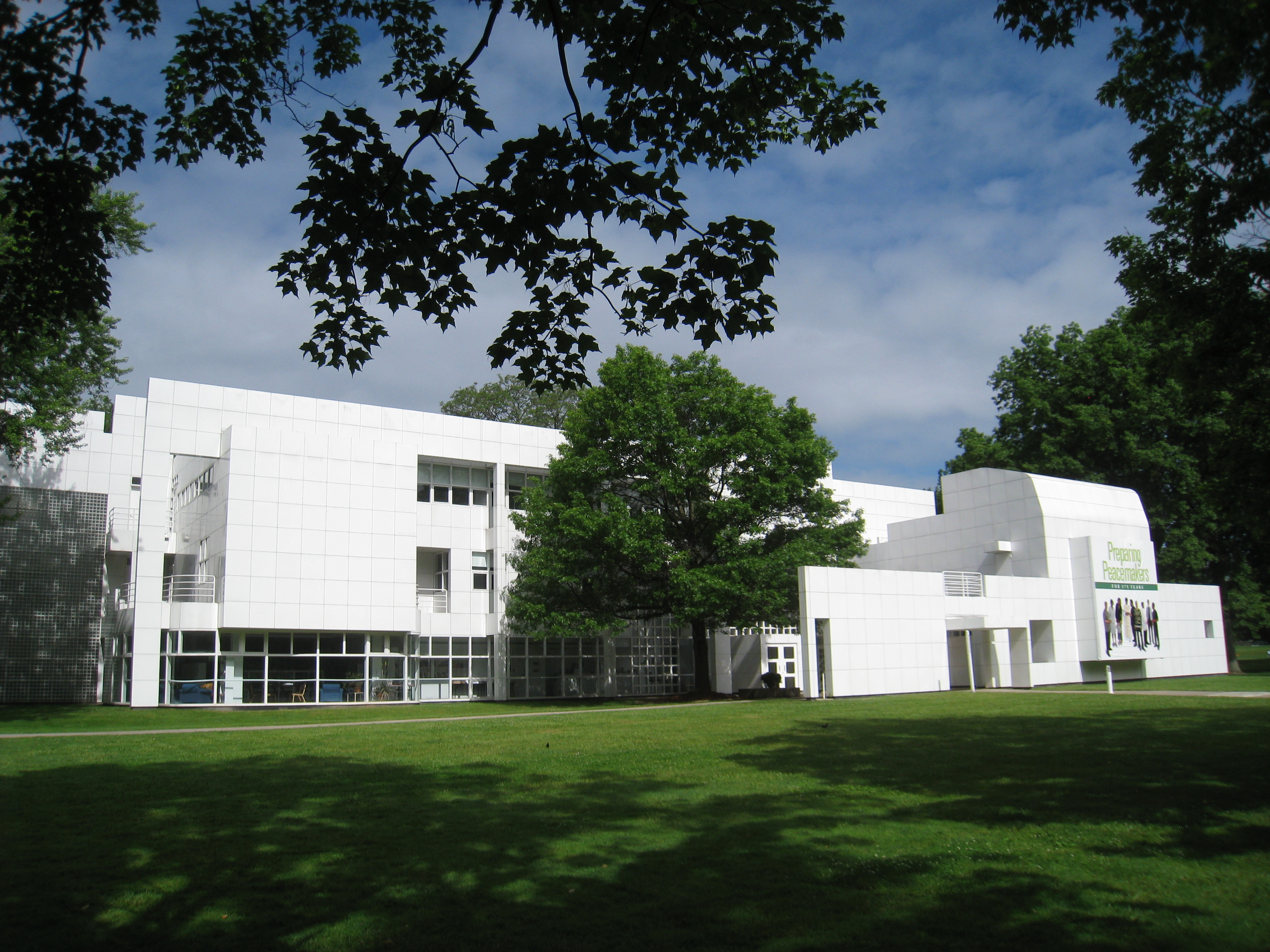
Hartford Seminary

The West End neighborhood, which runs from the Park River, just past the Mark Twain House to the West Hartford border, was mostly farmland until 1870. During the 1900s–1920s many two and three story homes were built, lending a residential, Victorian air to the neighborhood which persists to this day.

Elizabeth Park in the West End was created in 1895, when Charles N. Pond gave his estate to the Hartford Parks Commission which created the park and named it in honor of his wife. The park boasts a playground, softball field, and other recreational facilities in addition to views of the downtown skyline. It features the oldest, and one of the largest, municipal rose gardens in the United States. Elizabeth Park's famous rose arches were designed by noted rosarian Theodore Wirth in 1904.

The University of Connecticut School of Law, Watkinson School and the Hartford Seminary are located in the West End. Prospect Avenue boasts belle epoque and jazz age mansions, including the Governor's Mansion. Grand estates also line Scarborough Street, including the former residence of A. Everett 'Chick' Austin (Director of Wadsworth Atheneum from 1927 to 1944).

The southern West End and Parkville also constitute a local gay village, with many notable residents — including former Mayor Pedro Segarra, the second openly gay mayor of a US state's capital city.

== Sheldon/Charter Oak ==
Header

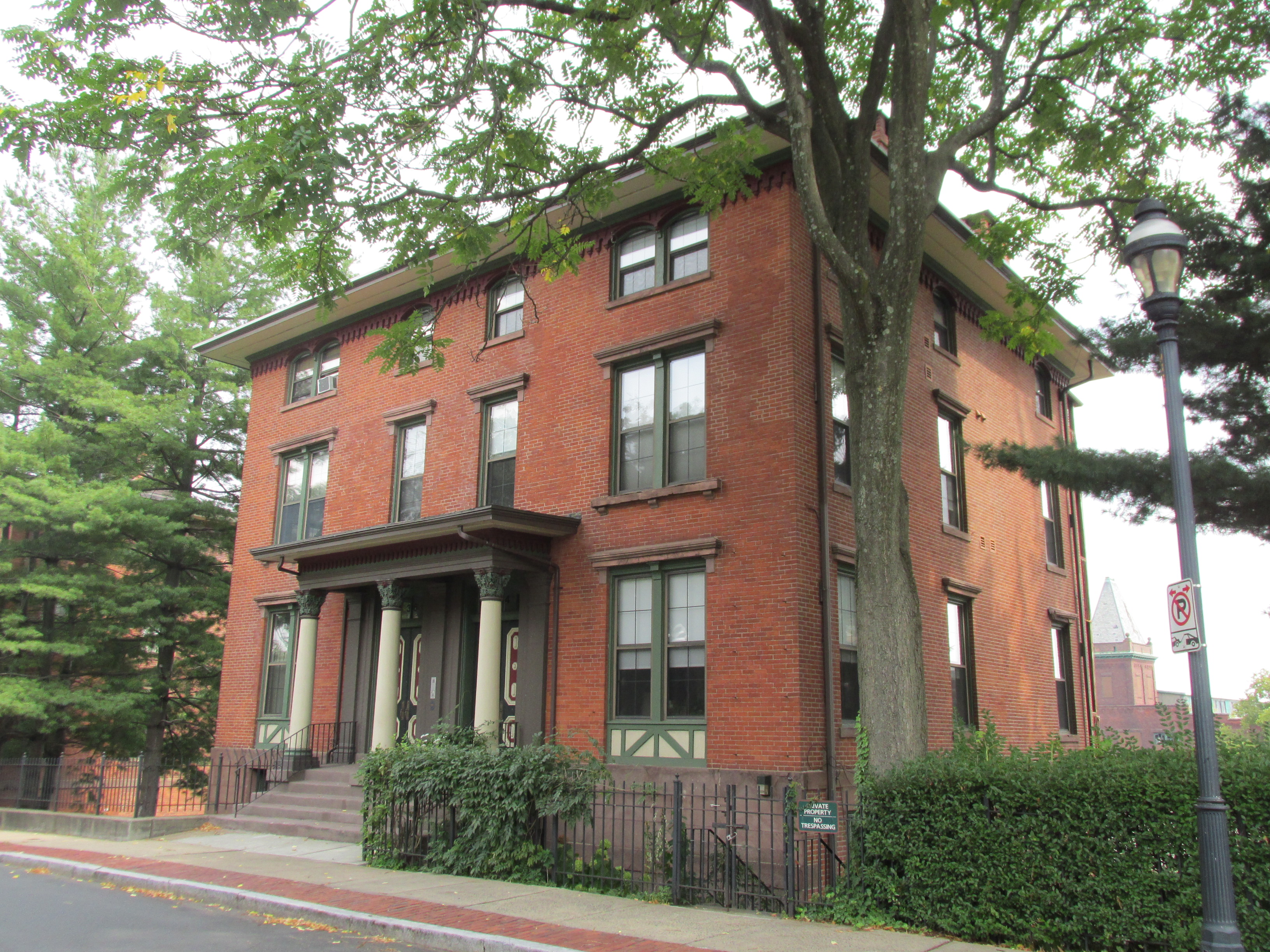
Charter Oak Place

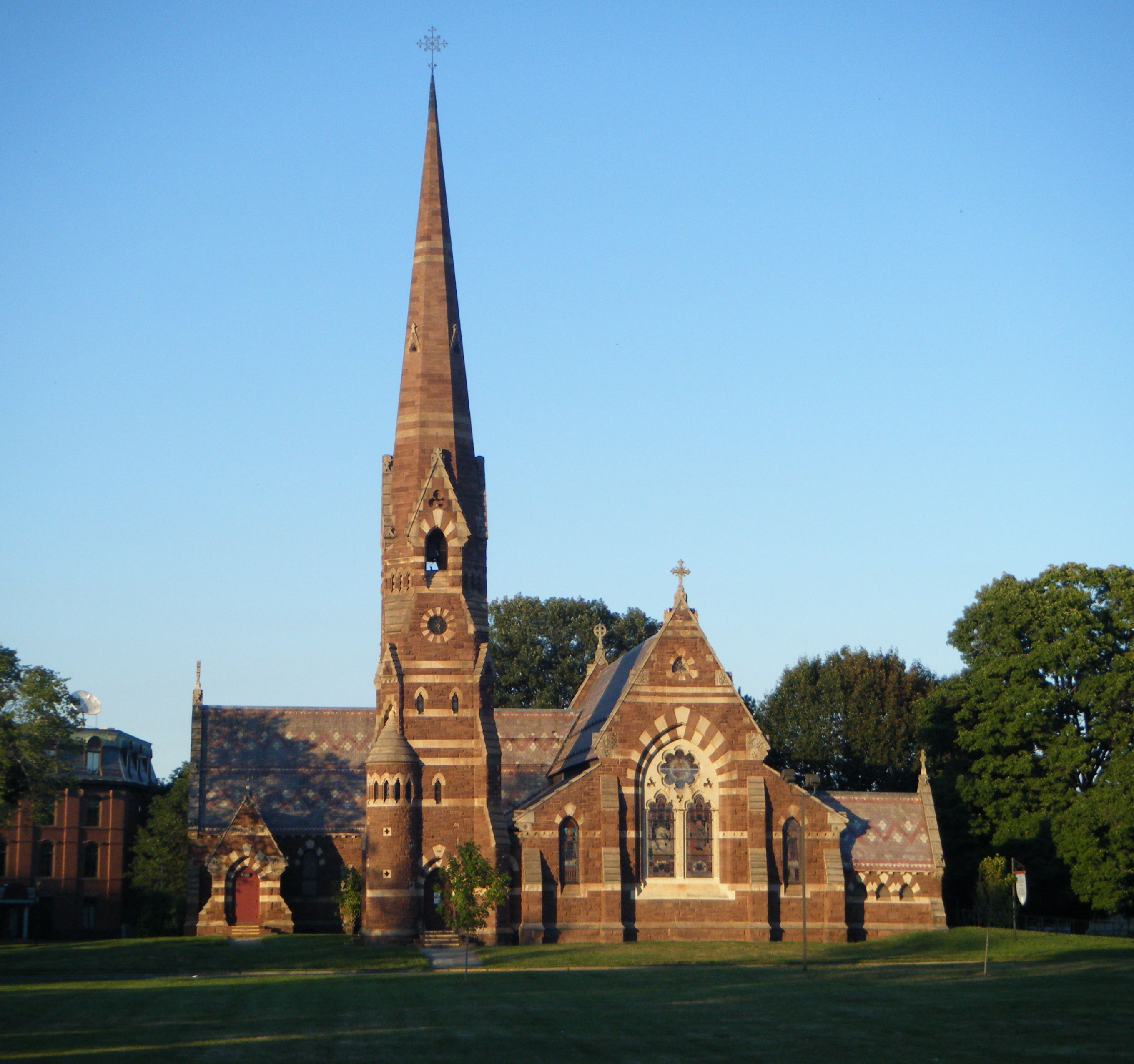
Church of the Good Shepherd

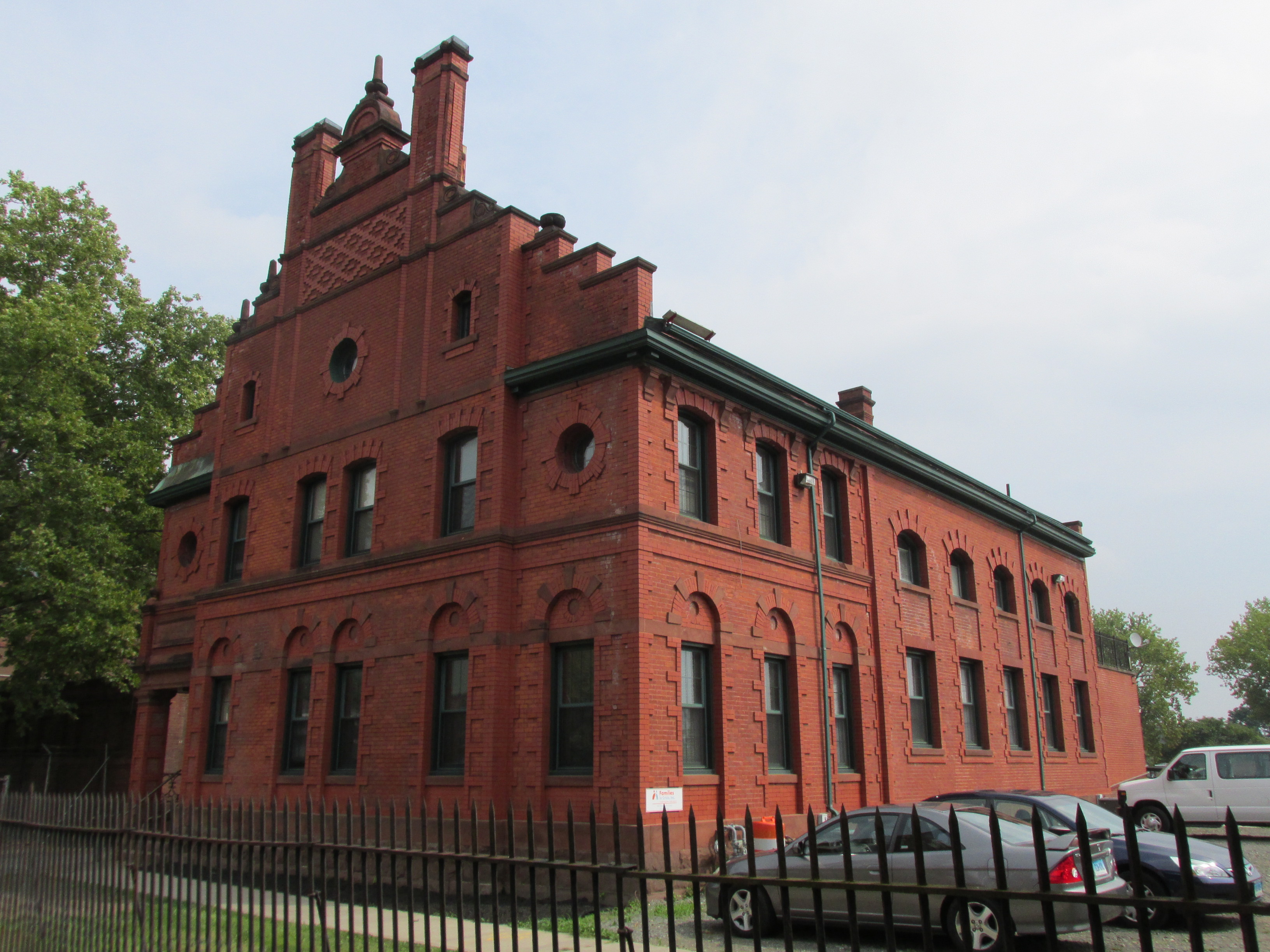
60 Popieluszko Court

The neighborhood is located just south of Downtown Hartford and Charter Oak Avenue, between Wethersfield Avenue and the Connecticut River.

In the neighborhood, the now-buried Park River connects to the Connecticut River via an underground conduit. In 1633, the Dutch chartered a trading post on the south bank of the river in the present-day Sheldon/Charter Oak, then known as the Little River, to contrast it with the Connecticut, the Great River. The area became known as Dutch Point, and the name of the Dutch fort, "House of Hope," is reflected in the name of Huyshope Avenue. It was here that, in 1636, the first English colonists founded the settlement of Hartford and laid out house lots in the South Plantation. The area was the site of The Charter Oak, an unusually old white oak tree in which, according to legend, colonists hid the Connecticut Royal Charter of 1662 to protect it from confiscation by an English governor-general. Thus the grand, stately tree came to symbolize the power of nature as a defender of freedom throughout Connecticut. In fact, the state adopted the image as the emblem of the Connecticut state quarter. The Charter Oak Monument is located at the corner of Charter Oak Place, a historic street, and Charter Oak Avenue.

The greatest influence on the development of Sheldon/Charter Oak and South Green was Samuel Colt, inventor of the automatic revolver, and his wife Elizabeth Colt. Although Colt is often considered the father of the Connecticut River Valley industrial revolution, there were in fact a handful of small outfits already in operation by the time the Colt Armory opened in 1848 in the South Meadows area of Sheldon/Charter Oak. Inspired by what he had seen during a trip to London in 1851, Colt embarked upon one of the boldest real estate development campaigns in Hartford's history. His intention to build an industrial community to house his workers adjacent to the armory. While not the largest, the most prominent or the most tightly controlled of America's 19th century company towns, Coltsville was among the country's first – and easily the most advanced of its time. By 1856, it was a city within a city, where workers of many nationalities and religions worked, lived and recreated alongside one another. Colt's complex also included the largest armory in the world, wharf and ferry facilities on the Connecticut River, and a gathering place named Charter Oak Hall for community gathering and leisure. Crowning the hilltop in the northwest corner of the complex was Armsmear, an enormous Italian villa Colt built for himself and his wife in 1857 that was likely by far the most luxurious structure in Hartford by fair at the time.

After a major fire destroyed the original armory in 1864, Colt's widow had the original armory rebuilt including the original structure's most dramatic feature: the blue onion dome with gold starts, topped by a gold orb and a rampant colt, the original symbol of Colt Manufacturing Company. Visible to commuters on I-91, the Colt Armory stands a monument to Hartford's first "celebrity industrialist," and the once mighty empire he created.

Following her son's death, Elizabeth Colt commissioned the Church of the Good Shepherd in 1896 as a monument to his life. Built in High Victorian Gothic style, architectural features include a variety of gun parts, such as bullet molds, gunsights and cylinders. This unusual characteristic earns the building the title of likely being the only church in the world with a gun motif.

When Elizabeth Colt died in 1904, she willed the majority of her estate, Armsmear, to the City of Hartford for use as a public park. Today, the 105 acres (42 ha) Colt Park services the community with a number of athletic fields, playgrounds, a swimming pool, playground, skating rink and Dillon Stadium.

Another Hartford industrialist who made his mark in the neighborhood is George Capewell. In 1881, he invented a machine that efficiently manufactured horseshoe nails, and his success made Hartford the "horseshoe nail capitol" of the world. The Capewell Horse Nail Company factory was built in 1903 at the corner of Charter Oak Avenue and Popieluszko Court. Shuttered by mid-century, it is slated to be turned into apartments. The factory's Romanesque Revival square tower and high pyramid-shaped slate roof is one of the last of its kind in Hartford. Capewell continued to manufacture horsenails and other products at its Bloomfield facility until its closure in 2012.

Towards the end of the 19th century, an influx of Polish immigrants occurred. Many worked in Hartford's factories and shops, including Colt and Capewell. The concentration of factories in the neighborhood allowed the Polish immigrants to settle along Sheldon, Governor, Woodbridge and Union streets. A second influx of Polish to the area during World War I grew the community. In 1913, the Polish National Alliance was formed to assist both newcomers and established residents and, in 1915, a new Saints Cyril and Methodius church was built on Governor Street to accommodate the ever-expanding congregation. The Polish National Home is a cultural and social organization that was created more than 80 years ago to serve the Polish-American community in Hartford. The 1930 Art Deco building on Charter Oak Avenue contains a full-service restaurant, banquet hall and meeting rooms.

== Upper Albany ==
Hartford's Upper Albany neighborhood is a large residential area extending on either side of Albany Avenue, one of the city's major traffic arteries, which runs through the center of the Upper Albany Historic District in a northwest–southeast direction and connects the area to downtown Hartford. Upper Albany is characterized almost exclusively by large, two-family frame houses built in the first two decades of the 20th century, when the area was developed as middle-class housing in the Queen Anne and Colonial Revival styles.

Prior to the 1890s the land which is included in the Upper Albany Historic District was occupied by family farms or by large estates associated with some of Hartford's leading families; it was mostly open. In 1871, the construction of the Connecticut Western Railroad (south of Homestead Avenue) attracted some industry to the area, but for the most part the land remained undeveloped. Albany Avenue had been a major thoroughfare since it was established as a turnpike at the beginning of the 19th century, but there were few houses along it. Most of the land along Albany Avenue was owned by railroad and insurance entrepreneur James Goodwin, with additional acreage held by James G. Batterson, a quarry owner and president of the Travelers Insurance Company. The Goodwin and Batterson estates were the major features of the area in the 19th century.

Just prior to 1900, the extension of Hartford's electric streetcar system up Albany Avenue enhanced the area's residential possibility. Real estate development companies quickly capitalized purchasing the acreage, laying out new streets, platting out house lots, and constructing most of the houses which now stand in the district. Hartford's oldest surviving school building is the North-West School. Built in 1891 as an addition to another school, and with other subsequent additions enlarging the facility, the school functioned until 1978 and is a well-preserved example of a late 19th-century school building, considered state of the art at the time of its construction. All but the current building were demolished. The building is listed on the National Register of Historic Places.

The character of Albany Avenue changed rapidly after World War I. It became largely commercial, with some older homes torn down to make way for businesses, and retail store fronts added to other residences. By 1920, most of the property owners in the area were Irish or Jewish because of the close-knit communities that had developed. Part of the attraction to the neighborhood was the proximity to Keney Park. The southernmost entrance is located on Greenfield Street. By the end of the 1920s the district was a multi-ethnic area with distinct Jewish, Irish, and Italian elements.

During and following World War II, the number of Black families living in Hartford increased dramatically, more than tripling as a percentage of the city's population between 1940 and 1960. Upper Albany continued to reflect the ethnic make-up of Hartford, as Black families bought homes in the neighborhood. Today, the neighborhood is composed of predominantly African-American, Puerto Rican and West Indian residents. One of the poorest neighborhoods in Hartford, it has a strong presence of community groups that are working towards revitalization through economic development. It is home to Artist Collective and new University of Hartford Performing Arts Center

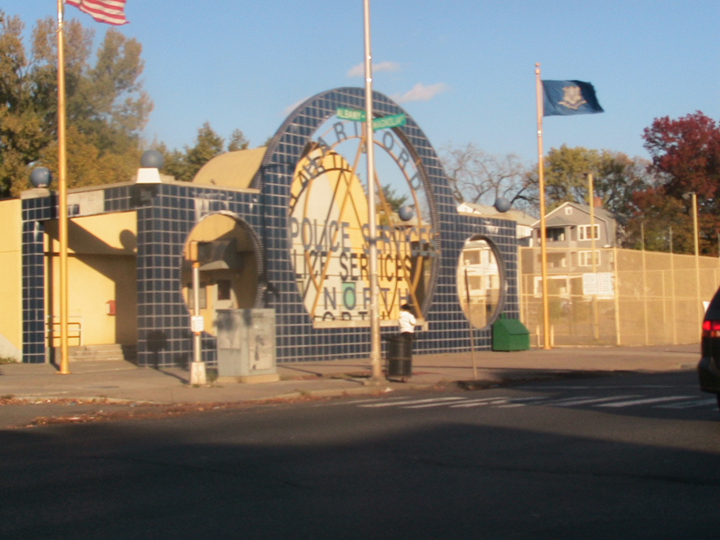
North End Police Headquarters

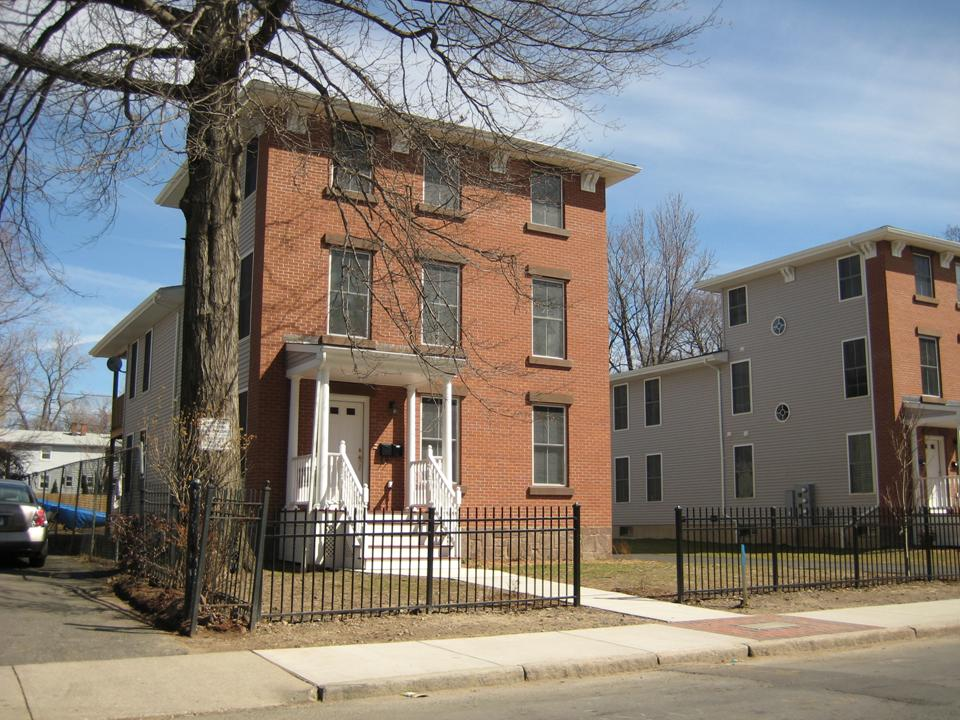
Belden Street revitalization

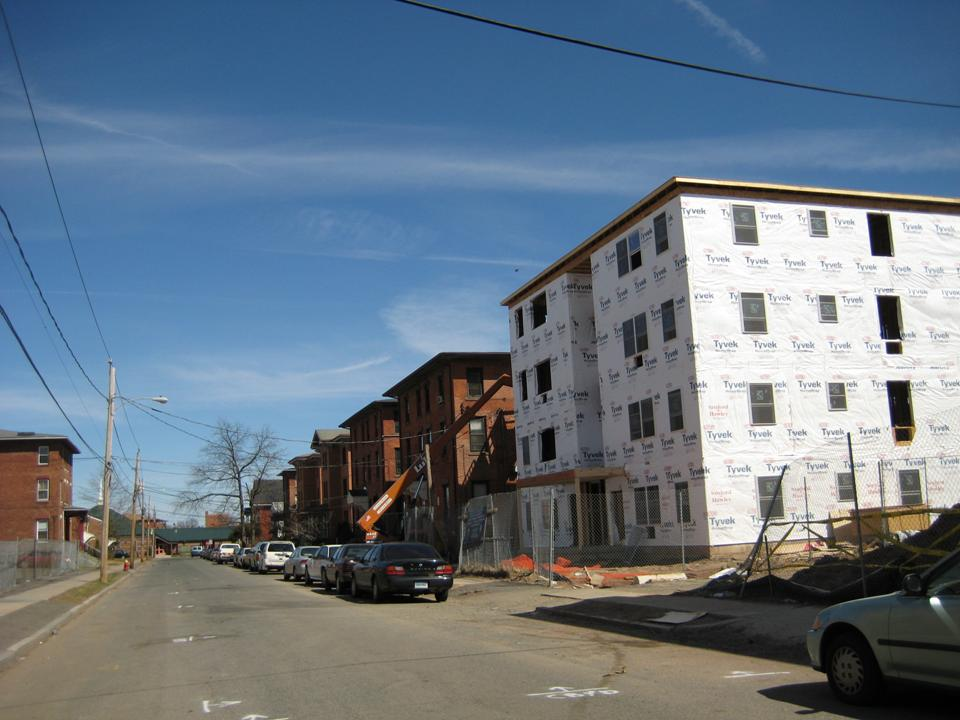
Bellevue Street revitalization

== Clay-Arsenal ==
Clay Arsenal is one of Hartford's oldest neighborhoods, developed in the middle and late 19th century. It was mainly farmland prior to 1847, when the Hartford and Springfield Railroad, which now forms the neighborhood's eastern border, was constructed. The section west of Main Street lies on a gentle rise above Downtown and is known as Clay Hill, so named for the type of soil there. The area east of Main Street has been known since 1812 as the Arsenal District, when a State Arsenal was constructed on the corner of North Main and Pavilion streets. The Arsenal was demolished in 1909.

The mid-19th century development of the Clay Hill area from rural to urban conditions was caused by the strong industrial growth of the city. As the city's factories rapidly grew more successful, the community at large was forced to keep up. The changes took the form of converting the farmland of long time residents to city streets for new homeowners. Multi-family dwellings were the dominant development in the late 19th century as the neighborhood became home to Irish and Jewish working-class families. The Irish had been emigrating to Hartford through a recruitment effort for work on the Enfield Falls Canal in Windsor Locks. Although he area has been primarily residential, in the post-Civil War era, the railroad attracted businesses, including a lumber yard, brewery and carriage works. Additionally, the Hartford County Jail was built in 1873 on Seyms Street. Designed by Hartford architect George Keller, it embodied the High Victorian Gothic style. The structure was demolished in 1978.

In 1895, Clay Hill was predominantly Irish. At about the same time, large numbers of Jews began arriving from Eastern Europe. The African-American community grew significantly during World War I when large numbers of southern blacks began to arrive. After World War II, the area began to see a growing number of Puerto Rican and West Indian families as well.

== South End and Little Italy ==
Maple Avenue, Wethersfield Avenue and Franklin Avenue are the three major roads in the South End, adjacent to the Hartford-Wethersfield town line in the southern part of the city. Franklin Avenue is known as the city's Little Italy. Although many Italians have moved just over the border to Wethersfield, Newington, and Rocky Hill, there is still a major Italian presence in that portion of the city. Eric Mangini, the former head coach of the New York Jets and the Cleveland Browns grew up on Franklin Avenue.

There are numerous Italian bakeries and merchants along Franklin Avenue. In the past few decades, there has been migration out of the South End, with many Puerto Rican families moving into the neighborhood.

The area's Italian population came out in full force when Italy won the FIFA World Cup in 2006 with thousands marching and driving down Franklin Avenue for hours with Italian flags raised high. In recent years many eastern European ethnic groups have moved into South End neighborhoods, predominantly Bosnians, Albanians and other ethnic groups from the former Republic of Yugoslavia.

The Hartford portion of 237-acre (0.96 km^{2}) Goodwin Park (85 acres of which are in the town of Wethersfield) is in the South End.

== South Green ==
The green was originally laid out as a common pasture in the 17th century and remained so well into the 19th century. The South Green Historic District encompasses a predominantly 19th-century residential area. This area features a variety of residences in both high and common styles, from the elaborate home of armsmaker Samuel Colt to multi-unit apartment houses, many of which were built between about 1860 and 1900. The district is roughly triangular, extending from South Green along Main Street and Wethersfield Avenue to include Morris, Dean, and Alden Streets. South Green is home to Barnard Park in honor of Henry Barnard, located on Main Street.

Hartford Hospital, the largest hospital in the area, and the adjacent Connecticut Children's Medical Center, which is the only hospital primarily for children, are also located in South Green.

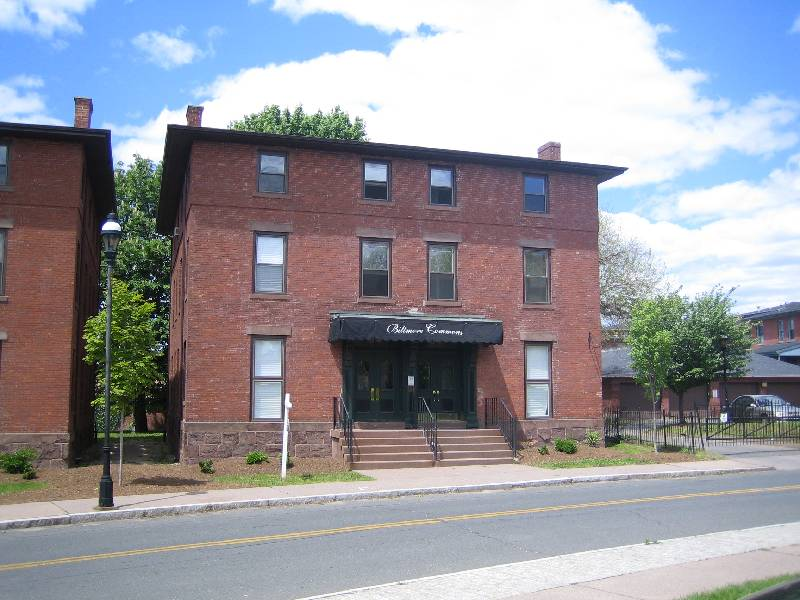
Biltmore Commons condominiums

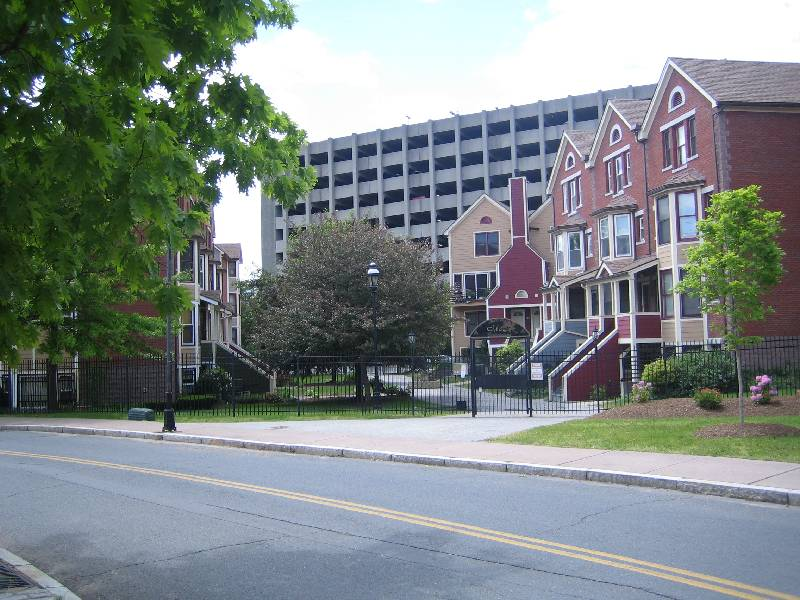
The Maple Avenue Mews condominiums

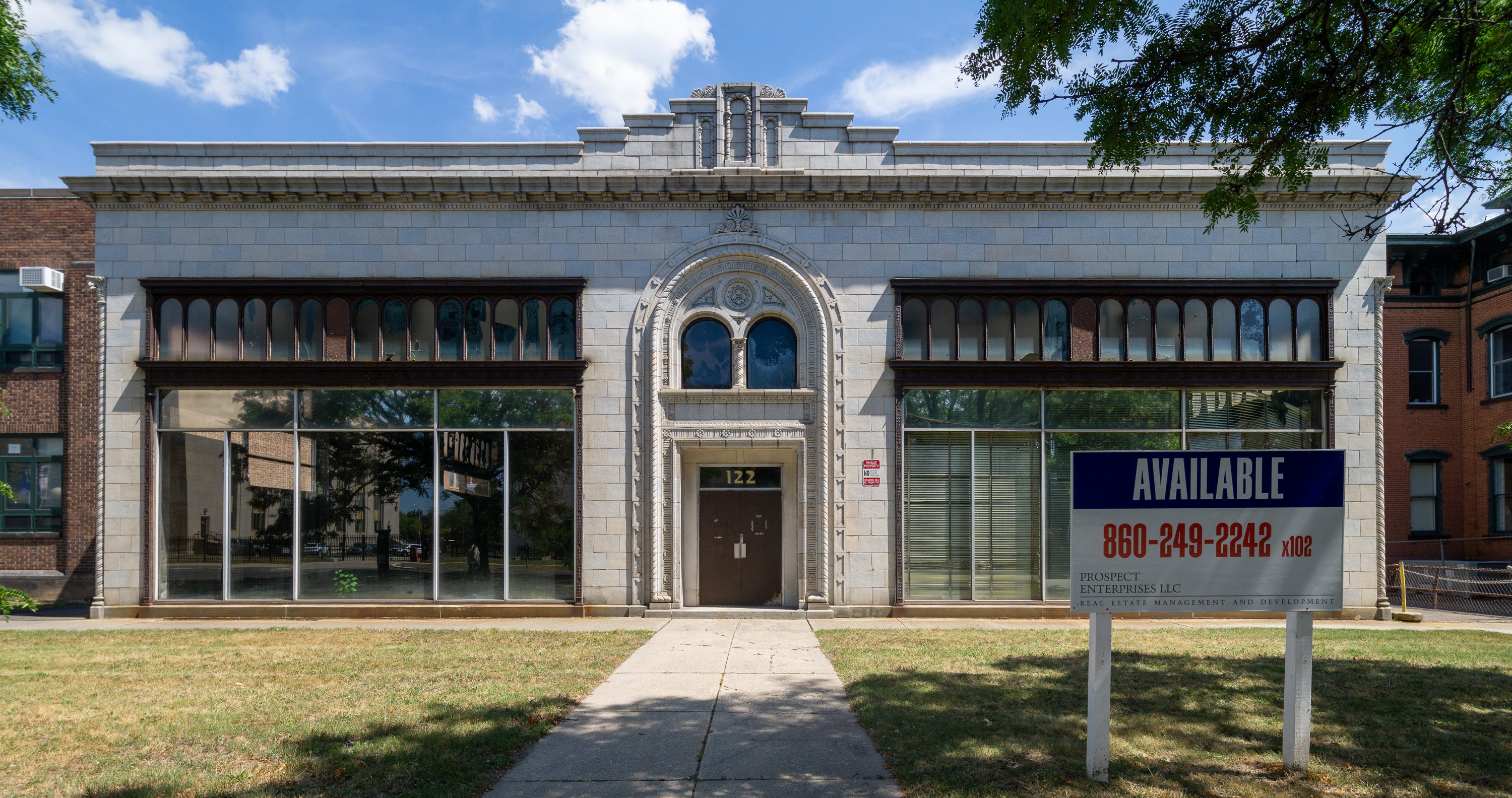
Art Deco building at 122 Washington Street

== Barry Square ==
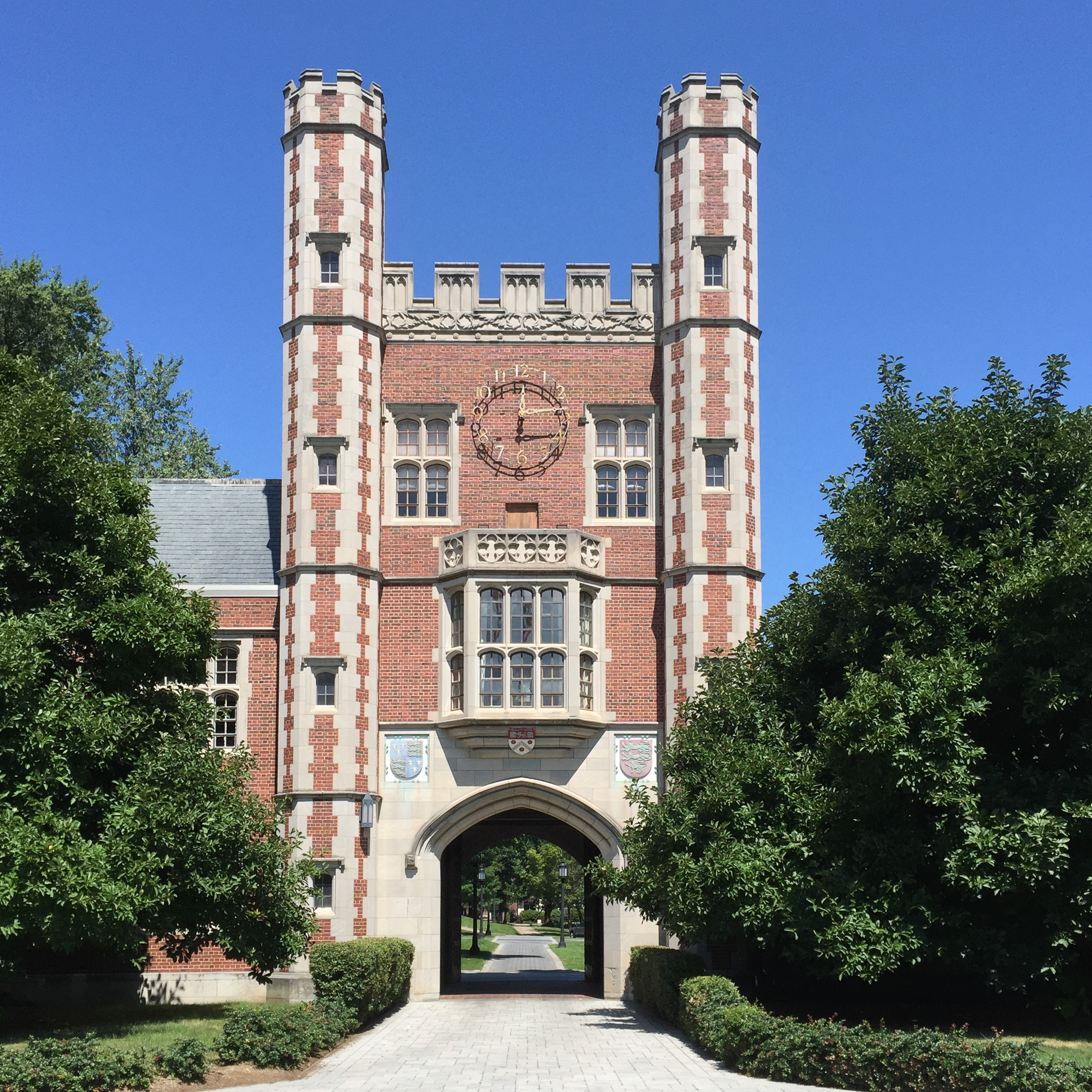
Downes Memorial Clock Tower, Trinity College

South of the South Green neighborhood is Barry Square, named for Father Michael Barry, Roman Catholic priest of St. Augustine's Church on Campfield Avenue, built in 1902. Many early parishioners at St. Augustine's were Irish who came to Hartford as laborers, the greatest number having come from County Kerry. This is Hartford's original Irish neighborhood.

Historically, the central part of the neighborhood served as a military campground in both the Revolutionary and Civil Wars, due to the open fields west of Campfield Avenue. In fact, this how the street acquired its name—the camp field stretched south and east from the site of the existing Campfield branch of the Hartford Public Library.

The Collegiate Gothic architecture of Trinity College Trinity College's campus dominates the northeast corner of the neighborhood, on land that was formerly known as "Gallows Hill" due to the number of hangings there. Although originally located in downtown Hartford where the Connecticut State Capitol building when founded in 1823, Trinity moved to its current site in 1872 after it purchased the land from the city of Hartford.

The Old South Burying Ground on Maple Avenue was established when the first burying ground in Hartford became filled. It is city's second oldest cemetery, dating to 1770. Originally called the Hartford Retreat for the Insane, The Institute of Living was founded in 1822. One of the oldest psychiatric treatment facilities in the country, landscape architect Frederick Law Olmsted, laid out the grounds as a park-like campus of 35 acres (14 ha). Today, it is part of Hartford Hospital and serves as a patient care, research and education facility in the fields of behavioral, psychiatric and addiction disorders.

Engine Company 15 Fire Station of the Hartford Fire Department has been in its Fairfield Avenue location since it opened in 1909. It is now the oldest extant firehouse in Hartford, and one of two surviving firehouses in the city which was built to stable horses.

== South Meadows ==
Located at the southeastern corner of the city, the area the South Meadows is an industrial and commercial area adjacent to the Connecticut River and transected by Interstate 91, Route 5 and Connecticut Route 15.

The area is home to Hartford–Brainard Airport. Located in a former cow pasture, Brainard Airfield is said to the first municipal airport in the country. Brainard Field, named after Hartford Mayor Newton C. Brainard, was dedicated on June 12, 1921. In 1927, 25,000 gathered there to greet Charles Lindbergh after his return from an historic flight to Paris. Brainard was the principal airport for the Greater Hartford region until Bradley International Airport opened in 1952. Today categorized it as a regional reliever airport facility, Brainard serves small aircraft, providing charter service and flight instruction. Today, the airport serves small aircraft, providing charter service and flight instruction. In addition, the Connecticut Aero Tech School is now located at Brainard. Offering training programs in aviation maintenance technology fields, the school is part of the Connecticut Technical High School System under the Department of Education. B

The Hartford Regional Market has been in operation since 1951 and is the largest perishable-food distribution terminal between New York and Boston, with a 32-acre (13 ha) facility and 185,000 square feet (56,388 square meters) of warehouse space. The Hartford Electric Light Company power plant, which started in 1921, is still operational and owned by Eversource Energy. The Metropolitan District Water Pollution Control Plant has been in operation since 1938; it is the largest of its kind in the state. Wastewater from greater Hartford communities is treated at the rate of an average of 100 million gallons daily. The Mid-Connecticut Resource Recovery Facility opened in 1987 and is on 57 acres (23 ha). Tucked into a corner of the neighborhood, away from public view, the South Meadows Pumping Station quietly does its work of flood control and prevention. It is part of the Metropolitan District Commission and a sister station of the Bushnell Park pumping station. Due to the large area required by the airport, industrial facilities and the dike that runs along the riverbank, access to the river in South Meadows is extremely limited.

== Southwest ==
South West is a predominantly residential neighborhood at the southwestern corner of the city, adjoining the towns of Wethersfield, Newington and West Hartford. Cedar Hill Cemetery, which was designed by landscape architect Jacob Weidenmann is located in Southwest.

The eastern boundary of the neighborhood is Fairfield Avenue, which runs along a natural ridge of land that is 159 feet above the Connecticut River and was once promoted as the "highest elevation in Hartford." The road was considered to be the main thoroughfare to Wethersfield and attracted leisure drivers with its sweeping vistas eastward and westward. In 1874 the Hartford Courant reported, "[Fairfield Avenue] commands from almost every rod of its entire distance a view of the Connecticut valley on the east and the fine stretch of country lying on the west—a most sightly and beautiful landscape in either direction. It will make altogether the longest direct drive with unobstructed outlooks, and the most attractive too, that we have in Hartford, and that is saying a good deal...."

While there are houses on Fairfield Avenue that date from the nineteenth century, the majority of the single and multi-family houses in the South West neighborhood were built between the 1940s–1960s. Recognizable patterns of American vernacular architecture predominate in the South West, including small colonial revival and cape cop designs, and there is a large degree of variability in house and lot size.

The most notable landmarks in the neighborhood are the beautiful Hyland Park and Cedar Hill Cemetery. Hyland Park, an old stone quarry site, was acquired by the City of Hartford in 1907 and, with its neighbor Rocky Ridge Park, was opened in 1911. Cedar Hill Cemetery is an exemplary landscape-park style open space. Laid out by landscape architects Jacob Weidenmann and Fredrick Law Olmsted, the chapel, gatehouse and several monuments were designed by George Keller. Several notables are buried at Cedar Hill, among them J.P. Morgan, Samuel Colt, the Galludets, Gideon Welles, and poet Wallace Stevens. Forster Heights Playground and Park, in the most southern portion of the neighborhood, also borders Cedar Hill Cemetery.

== Behind the Rocks ==
Behind the Rocks is a predominantly residential neighborhood at the southwestern corner of Hartford below Parkville, bordering the town of West Hartford. It was named from the rocky outcropping that serves as the western border of the Trinity College campus.

In the 1890s, the Rocky Hill Quarry, located on what is now called Rocky Ridge, produced trap rock which was used primarily for road building. Much of the heavy labor was performed by Irish immigrants. In 1876, the first St. Lawrence O'Toole Church was constructed to meet community needs. At the turn of the 20th century, trolley lines along Zion Street and New Britain Avenue opened up the neighborhood for residential development.

By 1912, the Rocky Hill Quarry had become a park, that is today known as the Thomas Hyland Memorial Park. The park provides a playground and sports fields for area families.

As the area became built up, blasting from the quarry became an issue with residents as well as with Trinity College. George Fairfield, park commissioner and civic leader, was very vocal, having had his home on Fairfield Avenue damaged by the concussions of blasting. In the early 1900s, the quarry was turned over to the city to be turned into a park. Today, there are ball fields and a playground to serve the neighborhood.

In 1920 a housing boom occurred on land between Zion Street and Hillside Avenue to accommodate workers in local factories. Ninety homes were built in a matter of seven months, some of which were of the Elizabethan style of architecture, some of which can still be seen.

In the 1940s, the city's fourth public housing project was built. Originally designed as low-income house, it was used to house for defense workers and their families as the country prepared for World War II. The project was named Charter Oak Terrace through a contest, the winner of which was awarded $15. The 1000-unit project was bounded by Flatbush Avenue, Newfield Street, Chandler Street and the south branch of the Park River. When the units were no longer needed to house defense workers, they became low-rent housing. The following decades saw the decline of the community as it became plagued with crime and drugs. It was demolished in the mid-1990s and in its place, a shopping center and new housing was built.

Along a segment of Brookfield Street, the Park River Greenway trail was created in 2008 as a recreational and environmental amenity that would ultimately hook into the East Coast Greenway, a planned pedestrian/bicycle corridor, from Maine to Florida. For now, the area is a stopover point for migrating birds as well as home to wildlife, including turkeys and foxes.

Behind the Rocks is also home to Breakthrough Magnet School, A.I. Prince Technical High School, the Job Corps Academy and the Hartford Housing Authority headquarters.

== North Meadows ==
Located just north of downtown along the CT River and I-91 the North Meadows is a commercial, industrial and recreational area that is home to many of the area's car dealerships. Once undeveloped farmland, where military encampments were held and wintertime brought skating on the Connecticut River, the North Meadows underwent tremendous change in the late 20th century. With large parcels of land and convenient access to Interstate 91 and downtown Hartford, it developed into an industrial, commercial and recreational area and is home to several auto dealerships, the headquarters of Connecticut Transit, the city's Bulky Waste & Recycling Center, the main branch of the U.S. Post Office, a correctional facility, municipal offices, as well as a live music venue and Riverside Park. The dike that prevents the Connecticut River from causing the kind of damage it once did can be seen on the way to Riverside Park. Included in the park are a high ropes challenge course, a playground, boat launch, and the Riverfront Recapture boathouse, home to numerous private clubs and the crew teams for numerous regional schools, including Watkinson School, East Hartford and Hartford public schools. After heavy rains or snow melt, parts of the park are underwater and it is then that the dike can be appreciated.

A landfill sited here operated from 1940 until December 31, 2008, when it was closed and a long-term environmental control system put into place. In 2011, the Connecticut Resources Recovery Authority embarked upon a project to install solar 4,000 collectors at the site, allowing for a six-acre solar field. It is also the home of Xfinity Theatre, an outdoor/indoor amphitheater. Also in the North Meadows are some of Hartford's "adult" attractions: Multiple shops specializing in pornography and other sexual novelties and a strip club are visible from I-91 north of the I-84 interchange.

== Blue Hills ==
Primarily a residential neighborhood, Blue Hills is located in the city's northwest section, and borders the suburbs of Bloomfield and West Hartford. The neighborhood is bordered by Albany Avenue on the south, Keney Park on the east, City Line to the north and the North Branch of the Park River (Hog River) to the West. It is home to approximately 10,000 residents, and is home to several schools and the University of Hartford. Other well-known institutions include Mount Sinai Hospital and Oak Hill Academy, the latter being a century-old establishment serving people with disabilities. The neighborhood boasts a wide variety of housing styles, varying from large, historic Tudors and colonials along Bloomfield Avenue and Ridgefield Street, to duplexes and modest capes and colonials. Although Blue Hills contains housing projects, it is mostly a working-class, African-American and Caribbean-American enclave. Its main thoroughfares include Granby Street, Blue Hills Avenue (Route 187), Plainfield Street, Bloomfield Avenue (Route 189) and Albany Avenue (Route 44). Connecticut Transit operates several bus routes through the neighborhood, such as the 50, 52 and 54, which run on Blue Hills Avenue, the 56 and 58, which run up on Albany Avenue and Bloomfield Avenue, the 74, which runs through Westbrook Village on its way to Copaco Shopping Center via Granby Street, and the 76, which runs on Cornwall Street towards Bowles Park. Blue Hills Avenue serves as both a main artery and a light commercial district, and is home to the two fire stations serving the area.

== Northeast ==
The Northeast neighborhood (sometimes known as North End) is the portion of Hartford east of the Blue Hills neighborhood and west of Interstate 91. It is home to the 1944 Hartford Circus Fire Memorial, Keney Park, which is the largest municipal park in New England and Weaver High School, which was also the alma mater of ER actor Eriq La Salle, All in the Family producer Norman Lear and (actress/comedian) Totie Fields.
