= List of killings by law enforcement officers in the United States, January 2021 =

This is a list of people reported killed by non-military law enforcement officers in the United States in January 2021, whether in the line of duty or not, and regardless of reason or method. The listing documents the occurrence of a death, making no implications regarding wrongdoing or justification on the part of the person killed or officer involved. Killings are arranged by date of the incident that caused death. Different death dates, if known, are noted in the description. The table below lists 89 people.

== January 2021 ==
| Date | Name (age) of deceased | Race | State (city) | Description |
|---|---|---|---|---|
| 2021-01-31 | Keith Scales (60) | White | Indiana (Carmel) | |
| 2021-01-31 | Chad Songer (42) | White | Tennessee (Pikeville) | |
| 2021-01-31 | Karl Walker (29) | Black | California (Dixon) | |
| 2021-01-31 | Ezekiel Meza (41) | Latino | New Mexico (Albuquerue) | |
| 2021-01-30 | Eric Kessler | White | Kentucky (Louisville) | |
| 2021-01-30 | Kenneth Dallas (61) | White | Arizona (Paradise Valley) | |
| 2021-01-29 | Javier Magdaleno (60) | Latino | California (La Quinta) | |
| 2021-01-29 | Chase Coats (34) | White | Texas (Baylor County) | |
| 2021-01-28 | Roger Hipskind (37) | Black | Indiana (Wabash) | |
| 2021-01-27 | Randy Miller (55) | Black | California (Los Angeles) | Miller was armed with a knife and assaulting his girlfriend inside a vehicle when he was shot dead by police. |
| 2021-01-27 | Erick Mejia (26) | Hispanic | Texas (San Antonio) | An officer inspecting 18-wheelers pulled Mejia over, and Mejia fled on foot. At a mall parking lot, video captured by a witness showed Mejia with a gun he refused to drop. He was shot when he raised the gun at officers. |
| 2021-01-27 | Kevin Levira Desir (43) | Black | Florida (Pompano Beach) | While in custody at Broward County Jail in Pompano Beach, Desir cut himself and was placed in a restraint chair, where he "attempted to kick staff and defeat all efforts to be restrained for his own safety". Desir lost consciousness and died ten days later in hospital. |
| 2021-01-26 | Steven Crosby (38) | White | California (Hemet) | |
| 2021-01-26 | Harmony Wolfgram | White | Colorado (Aurora) | |
| 2021-01-26 | Mark Meza (61) | White | California (Vacaville) | |
| 2021-01-26 | Edward Bittner (37) | White | Alabama (Mobile) | |
| 2021-01-26 | Felix Santos (48) | Hispanic | Texas (San Antonio) | Santos was shot and killed by police after a car chase. Santos allegedly exited his vehicle and fired at Bexar County Sheriff's deputies, leading them to shoot back. |
| 2021-01-25 | John Ostbye (50) | White | Washington (Graham) | |
| 2021-01-24 | Tyree Rogers (38) | Black | Texas (Wichita Falls) | |
| 2021-01-24 | Caleb McCree (43) | White | Louisiana (Slidell) | |
| 2021-01-22 | Steven Verdone | White | Florida (Homosassa) | |
| 2021-01-22 | Jose Lizarraga Garcia (41) | Latino | California (Indio) | |
| 2021-01-21 | Ryan Stallings (33) | White | Texas (College Station) | |
| 2021-01-21 | Brain Abbott (34) | White | Kentucky (Caneyville) | |
| 2021-01-21 | David McFarlane (51) | Black | New York (New York City) | In the Wakefield neighborhood of The Bronx, a police sergeant and detective observed a man later identified as 51-year old David McFarlane chasing a woman with a knife, the officers approached the individual and the individual ran at the officer with the knife. Officers fired 5-6 shots at individual. |
| 2021-01-21 | David Lee Tovar Jr. (27) | Black | California (San Jose) | Tovar Jr., allegedly connected to several violent offenses, ran from police and was given multiple commands to show his hands. He was shot by police after reaching into his waistband to pull out what looked like a gun. However, Tovar had been unarmed. |
| 2021-01-20 | Frank Gonzales (38) | Latino | California (Fresno) | |
| 2021-01-20 | Bradley Lewis (19) | White | Arizona (Casas Adobes) | |
| 2021-01-20 | Eusi Kater (21) | Black | Alabama (Titusville) | |
| 2021-01-19 | Robert Bull (55) | White | Arkansas (Perryville) | |
| 2021-01-19 | Christopher Austin Dockery (32) | White | Colorado (Greeley) | Dockery eluded police attempting to pull him over. An ensuing car chase ended in a car crash; Dockery attempted a carjacking, armed with a handgun; he was fatally shot after refusing to comply with police demands to surrender. At the time of his death, Dockery was on parole (having been released from prison in September 2020) and had active felony kidnapping, menacing and robbery warrants arising from an incident on January 5. |
| 2021-01-18 | Kevin Well (56) | White | Alabama (Cropwell) | |
| 2021-01-18 | Christopher Anderson (27) | Black | Ohio (Toledo) | During a police standoff, Anderson came running out of a house in which he had barricaded himself, firing at police and shooting one fatally. Officers returned fire, hitting him 8 times and killing him. |
| 2021-01-18 | Robert Calderon (46) | White | California (Sacramento) | |
| 2021-01-17 | Daniel Young (25) | White | Indiana (Marion) | |
| 2021-01-17 | Daniel Canales | Latino | Arizona (Goodyear) | |
| 2021-01-17 | Zonterius Johnson (24) | Black | Oklahoma (Lawton) | Police were conducting a compliance check at a lounge when they heard shots fired outside. When police encountered Johnson, he faced an officer and drew the weapon. He was ordered to drop the weapon, and was shot by police. |
| 2021-01-15 | Jean Paul Stanley | White | Texas (El Paso) | |
| 2021-01-15 | Kershawn Geiger (24) | Black | California (Carmichael) | |
| 2021-01-15 | Reginald Johnson (48) | Black | Mississippi (Biloxi) | Police responded to a disturbance outside Harrison County Courthouse, where Johnson displayed a knife and advanced on a deputy, who then shot and killed him. |
| 2021-01-15 | Unnamed man (65) | Unknown | Arizona (Prescott Valley) | |
| 2021-01-15 | Justin Pegues | White | Texas (Rusk) | |
| 2021-01-14 | Jeffrey Kite (36) | White | Virginia (South Chesterfield) | |
| 2021-01-13 | Joshua Van Machado (43) | White | California (Visalia) | |
| 2021-01-13 | Vinnie Hamlet (17) | White | Oklahoma (Oklahoma City) | |
| 2021-01-13 | Lymond Moses (30) | Black | Delaware (Wilmington) | Police body cam video shows Moses driving away from police in his vehicle, making a U-turn, and then driving toward police at a high speed. Police then fired on his vehicle. |
| 2021-01-12 | Gary Rodriguez (54) | Latino | Louisiana (Montegut) | |
| 2021-01-12 | Antonio Carbajal (23) | Latino | Arizona (Phoenix) | |
| 2021-01-12 | Ty Walvatne-Donahey (32) | White | Colorado (Lakewood) | |
| 2021-01-11 | Junius Thomas (31) | White | Ohio (Liberty Township) | |
| 2021-01-11 | Jesse Davila | Latino | Texas (Edinburg) | |
| 2021-01-11 | Daryl Dye (45) | White | South Carolina (Warrenville) | |
| 2021-01-10 | Brian Williams (37) | White | Arkansas (Bentonville) | |
| 2021-01-10 | Kenya Reed (18) | Black | Alabama (Chickasaw) | |
| 2021-01-10 | Mark Bivins (28) | Unknown | Indiana (Munster) | |
| 2021-01-10 | Joseph Howell (49) | White | Kansas, Topeka | |
| 2021-01-10 | Allen Mirzayan (48) | White | California (Altadena) | Shot by law enforcement near 481 Figueroa Drive. |
| 2021-01-10 | Patrick Warren Sr. (52) | Black | Texas (Killeen) | During a mental health call Warren exited his house waving his arms and approached an officer, who shouted for Warren to stop and stay down. The officer tasered Warren, who then charged at the officer and was shot. Warren was unarmed during the shooting. |
| 2021-01-09 | Paul Bolden (37) | Black | Arizona (Phoenix) | |
| 2021-01-09 | Xzavier Hill (18) | Black | Virginia (Ridge) | |
| 2021-01-09 | Mathew Oxendine (46) | Black | North Carolina (Pembroke) | |
| 2021-01-09 | Jason Nightengale (32) | Black | Illinois (Evanston) | Nightengale was shot and killed by Evanston Police after killing five and injuring two in a mass shooting in Chicago and Evanston. |
| 2021-01-09 | Betty Francois (91) | White | California (Victorville) | Francois, a blind and deaf 91-year-old woman, was fatally shot by police. |
| 2021-01-08 | Brian Andren (47) | White | Minnesota (Robbinsdale) | The Robbinsdale Police Department tried to stop a vehicle that was registered to an individual with an active felony warrant. The vehicle was stopped by police using a PIT maneuver. The driver, Andren, charged at officers with a knife. After unsuccessfully attempting to tase him, one officer shot Andren as he continued to advance. |
| 2021-01-08 | Kwamena Ocran (24) | Black | Maryland (Gaithersburg) | Four Gaithersburg Police Department plain clothes officers approached Ocran after a report of a man with a handgun. Ocran fled and was chased by police, who shot him dead when he displayed his gun. |
| 2021-01-08 | Charles Williams (47) | Unknown | Tennessee (Sparta) | |
| 2021-01-07 | John Neitling (40) | White | Michigan (Chesaning) | |
| 2021-01-06 | Jacob Macduff (26) | White | Oregon (Tigard) | |
| 2021-01-06 | Ashli Babbitt (35) | White | Washington, D.C. | During the storming of the United States Capitol, Babbitt, was fatally shot by a Capitol Police officer inside the Capitol building, as she and more than a dozen other pro-Donald Trump rioters attempted to gain access to a hallway leading to the House chamber. |
| 2021-01-06 | Benicio Vasquez (34) | Hispanic | Connecticut (Hartford) | An FBI task force was arresting a suspect in the North End neighborhood when another man, Vasquez, allegedly opened fire on them. An FBI agent and a New Britain Police officer returned fire, killing Vasquez. The New Britain officer had been involved in a separate shooting in 2017, in which the officer was cleared of wrongdoing. |
| 2021-01-06 | Robert Howard | Black | Tennessee (Memphis) | A Memphis Police officer was arrested for allegedly kidnapping and murdering Howard while on-duty. Howard's brother said that Howard was dating a woman who used to be in a relationship with the officer. |
| 2021-01-05 | Jose Guzman (27) | Latino | Texas (Houston) | |
| 2021-01-05 | Vincent Belmonte (18) | Black | Ohio (Cleveland) | |
| 2021-01-05 | Michael Conlon (28) | White | Massachusetts (Newton Highlands) | |
| 2021-01-05 | Shawn McCoy (36) | White | Washington (Spokane) | |
| 2021-01-05 | Alex Gonzales (27) | Black | Texas (Austin) | Off-duty Austin police officer Gabriel Gutierrez shot Gonzales after he claimed Gonzales cut him off in traffic and pointed a gun at him. Austin police officers yelled at Gonzales to get on the ground, but Gonzales, bleeding, ignored the calls as he moved to check on his 2-month-old child. Austin police officers then shot Gonzales 10 times. |
| 2021-01-05 | Jamal Sutherland | Black | South Carolina (North Charleston) | While attempting to remove Sutherland from a jail cell for a bond hearing, a Charleston County Sheriff's deputy deployed a stun gun after Sutherland resisted. After being stunned multiple times, Sutherland became unresponsive and was later pronounced dead. |
| 2021-01-04 | Michael Romo (28) | White | Arizona (Payson) | |
| 2021-01-04 | Amanda Faulkner | White | Alabama (Columbiana) | |
| 2021-01-03 | Sonny Brower (85) | White | South Carolina (Mount Pleasant) | A deputy was speeding while responding to a non-emergency domestic dispute call and hit the vehicle Brower and Eisner were sitting in, killing them both. |
| 2021-01-03 | Sandra Eisner (77) | White | South Carolina (Mount Pleasant) | A deputy was speeding while responding to a non-emergency domestic dispute call and hit the vehicle Brower and Eisner were sitting in, killing them both. |
| 2021-01-03 | Henry Martinez (49) | White | Oregon (Ontario) | |
| 2021-01-03 | Tre-Kedrian White (20) | Black | South Carolina (Richburg) | |
| 2021-01-03 | La Garion Smith (27) | Black | Florida (Homestead) | |
| 2021-01-03 | James Reising (59) | White | Missouri (Jefferson City) | Missouri state troopers say Reising raised a large knife at them. Reising allegedly refused commands to drop it, leading the troopers to shoot. |
| 2021-01-02 | Anthony Cano (17) | Latino | Arizona (Chandler) | An officer attempted to pull Cano over when he abandoned his bicycle and ran towards a park. According to police Cano dropped a gun but reached towards it, causing the officer to shoot. Cano died on January 23. |
| 2021-01-02 | David Alvarado | Latino | California (San Gabriel) | |
| 2021-01-01 | Carl Dorsey III (39) | Black | New Jersey (Newark) | |
| 2021-01-01 | Isaac Matheney (37) | Black | Oregon (Lakeview) | |

== See also ==
- Death in custody § United States
- Henry A. Wallace Police Crime Public Database
- List of cases of police brutality
- List of countries with annual rates and counts for killings by law enforcement officers
- List of law enforcement officers killed in the line of duty in the United States
- List of law enforcement officers convicted for an on-duty killing in the United States
- List of police reforms related to the George Floyd protests
- List of unarmed African Americans killed by law enforcement officers in the United States
- Lists of killings by law enforcement officers
- Police brutality in the United States
- Police misconduct § United States
- Police riot § United States
- Police use of deadly force in the United States
