= Capewell Horse Nail Company =

- U.S. National Register of Historic Places
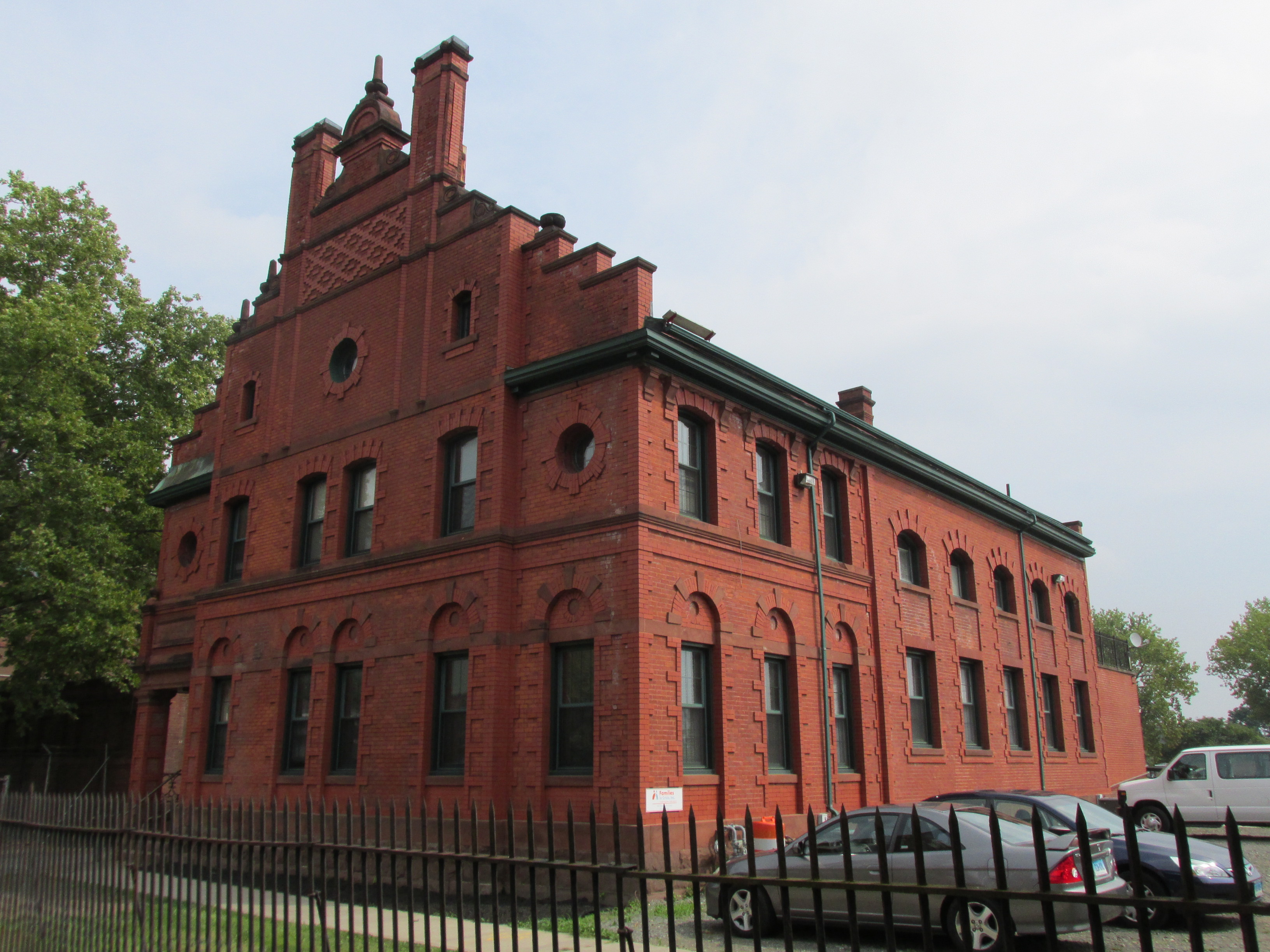
- Capewell Horse Nail Company

- Location within Connecticut Location within the United States
- Location: 60-70 Popieluszko Street Hartford, Connecticut
- Coordinates: 41°45′28″N 72°40′20″W
- Area: 6.07 acres (2.46 ha)
- Built: 1903
- Architect: Berlin Iron Works, Empire Bridge Company
- NRHP reference No.: 99000927
- Added to NRHP: March 1, 2000

The Capewell Horse Nail Company is a historic brick industrial complex located in the neighborhood of Sheldon/Charter Oak in Hartford, Connecticut. It was built in 1903 by industrialist George Capewell at the corner of Charter Oak Avenue and Popieluszko Court after the previous headquarters burned down.

Twenty years earlier, in 1881, Capewell invented a machine that efficiently manufactured horseshoe nails, and his success made Hartford the "horseshoe nail capital" of the world.

The factory building includes a Romanesque Revival-style square tower with brick corbeling and a high pyramidal roof. The administration building is Hartford's finest example of Dutch architecture with highly articulated brick and brownstone details. The Jacobean front gable is detailed with elaborately patterned brickwork not found elsewhere in Hartford.

The company was acquired by Hartford/Standard Machine Screw Company in 1970 and operated as a subsidiary. The company was then sold to private investors in the early 1980s. The horseshoe nail division was sold to Mustad in 1985 and the saw blade division was sold to Rule Industries in 1986. The plant was closed when the parachute hardware division was moved to Bloomfield in the late 1980s. Capewell continued to manufacture horsenails and other products at its Bloomfield facility until its closure in 2012.

The Corporation for Independent Living, a non-profit housing group, acquired the property in 2014 and plans to convert it into apartments. The property was listed on the National Register of Historic Places in 2000.

== See also ==
- National Register of Historic Places listings in Hartford, Connecticut
