= Engine Company 15 Fire Station =

- U.S. National Register of Historic Places
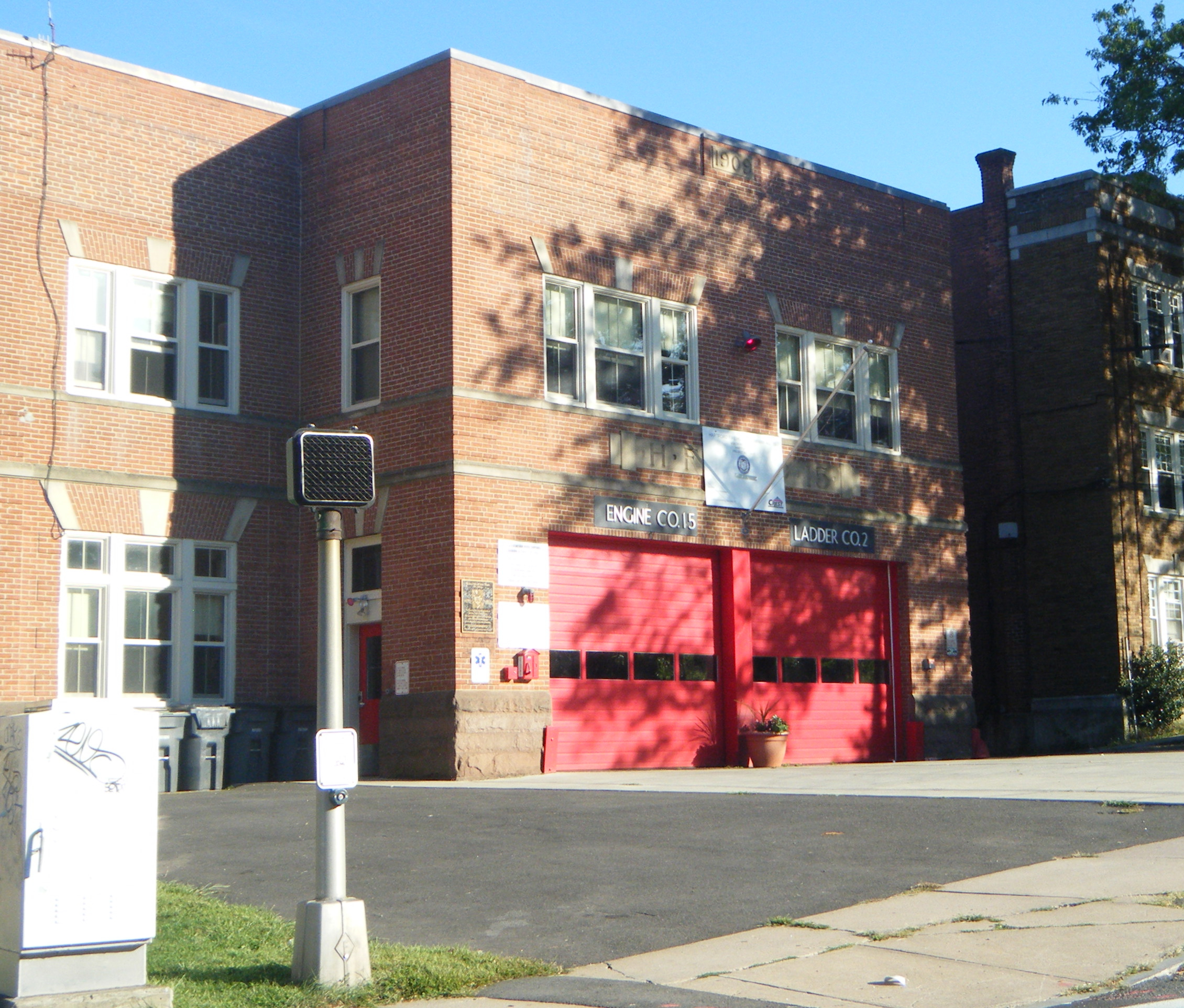

- Location within Connecticut Location within the United States
- Location: 8 Fairfield Avenue, Hartford, Connecticut
- Coordinates: 41°44′31″N 72°41′32″W
- Area: 0.3 acres (0.12 ha)
- Built: 1909
- Architect: Zunner & Sellew
- Architectural style: Colonial Revival
- MPS: Firehouses of Hartford MPS
- NRHP reference No.: 89000023
- Added to NRHP: March 2, 1989

The Engine Company 15 Fire Station is located at 8 Fairfield Avenue in Hartford, Connecticut. It was built in 1909, and is one of two surviving firehouses in the city which was built to stable horses. It was listed on the National Register of Historic Places on March 2, 1989. It presently houses Engine Company 15 and Ladder Company 2 of the Hartford Fire Department.

== Description and history ==
The Engine Company 15 Fire Station is located in southwestern Hartford, at junction of Fairfield and New Britain Avenues. It is a two-story brick building with Colonial Revival features. It is roughly rectangular in shape, three bays wide, with the leftmost pedestrian entrance bay recessed. The right two bays house equipment, and have rectangular garage door openings. Windows on the second floor are in groups of three, with splayed lintels that have stone keystones. Stone stringcourses run at the top of the first-floor windows and at the bottom of the second-floor windows. A stone panel above the equipment bays is carved with the company identification. The upstairs rooms feature original woodwork, including door and window trim. Wooden doors conceal the slide pole, and the rear of the story contains exposed elements of what originally served as a hay loft. Behind the equipment bays on the ground floor is a kitchen space that is built into what were originally horse stalls. The basement includes an area formerly used for hose drying.

Engine Company 15 was organized in 1909, and this was its first station. It was designed by the Hartford firm of Zunner and Sellew. It has lost a number of its exterior architectural features, particularly around the equipment bay openings, which have been enlarged, and the roof, which used to have a more elaborate cornice.

== See also ==
- National Register of Historic Places listings in Hartford, Connecticut
