= North-West School =

- U.S. National Register of Historic Places
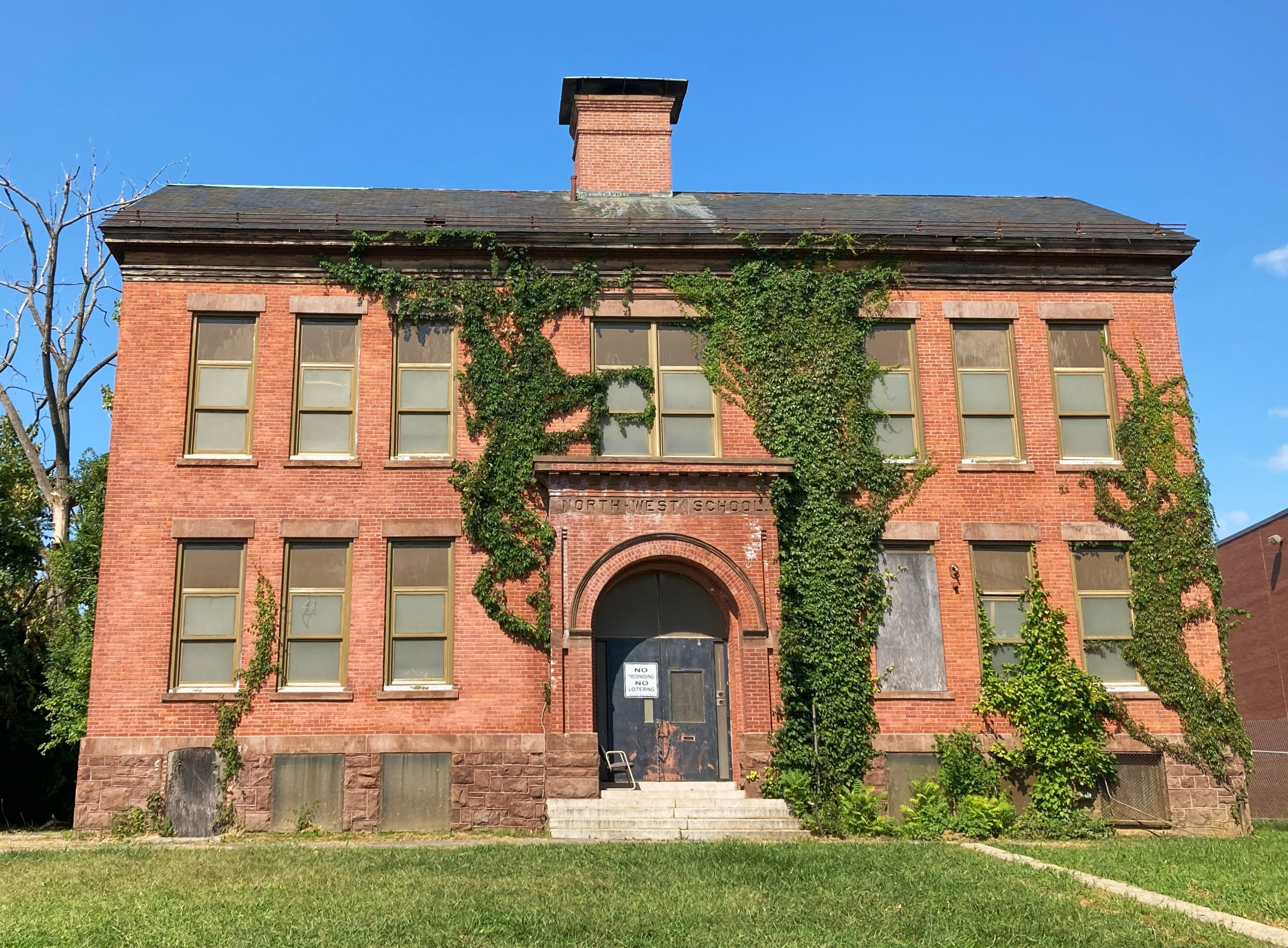

- Location within Connecticut Location within the United States
- Location: 1240 Albany Avenue, Hartford, Connecticut
- Coordinates: 41°46′57″N 72°41′48″W
- Area: less than one acre
- Built: 1891
- Architect: Cook, Hapgood & Co.
- Architectural style: Late Victorian
- NRHP reference No.: 10000339
- Added to NRHP: June 10, 2010

The North-West School is a historic school building at 1240 Albany Avenue in Hartford, Connecticut. Built in 1891, it is a well-preserved example of a late 19th-century school building, considered state of the art at the time of its construction. It served the city as a school until 1978, and now stands vacant. It was listed on the National Register of Historic Places in 2010.

== Description and history ==
The North-West School is located in northern Hartford, on the north side of Albany Avenue (United States Route 44), between the Albany branch of the Hartford Public Library, and an arts organization. It is a two-story masonry structure, built out of brick and covered by a gabled roof. Its front facade is seven bays wide, with a center entrance recessed behind a broad round-headed arch lined with drip moulding. The outer bays have single sash windows with brownstone lintels and sills, while above the entrance are a pair of similar windows; that space was originally occupied by a three-part window. The interior is organized around a central hall and staircase, with classrooms on either side, one of which was later converted into school offices.

The first school to be built on this property was a two-room structure built in 1871. The present building, the only survivor of a long series of alterations, was built in 1891 as a major addition to the first building, and was originally oriented facing Woodland Street, where the arts center now stands. In 1915, the 1871 building was demolished, and this structure was relocated to its present site. It underwent a number of additions, as the area's population increased and more classroom space was needed. The school was used until 1978, at which time all of the additions were demolished.

== See also ==
- National Register of Historic Places listings in Hartford, Connecticut
