= Polish National Home (Hartford, Connecticut) =

- U.S. National Register of Historic Places
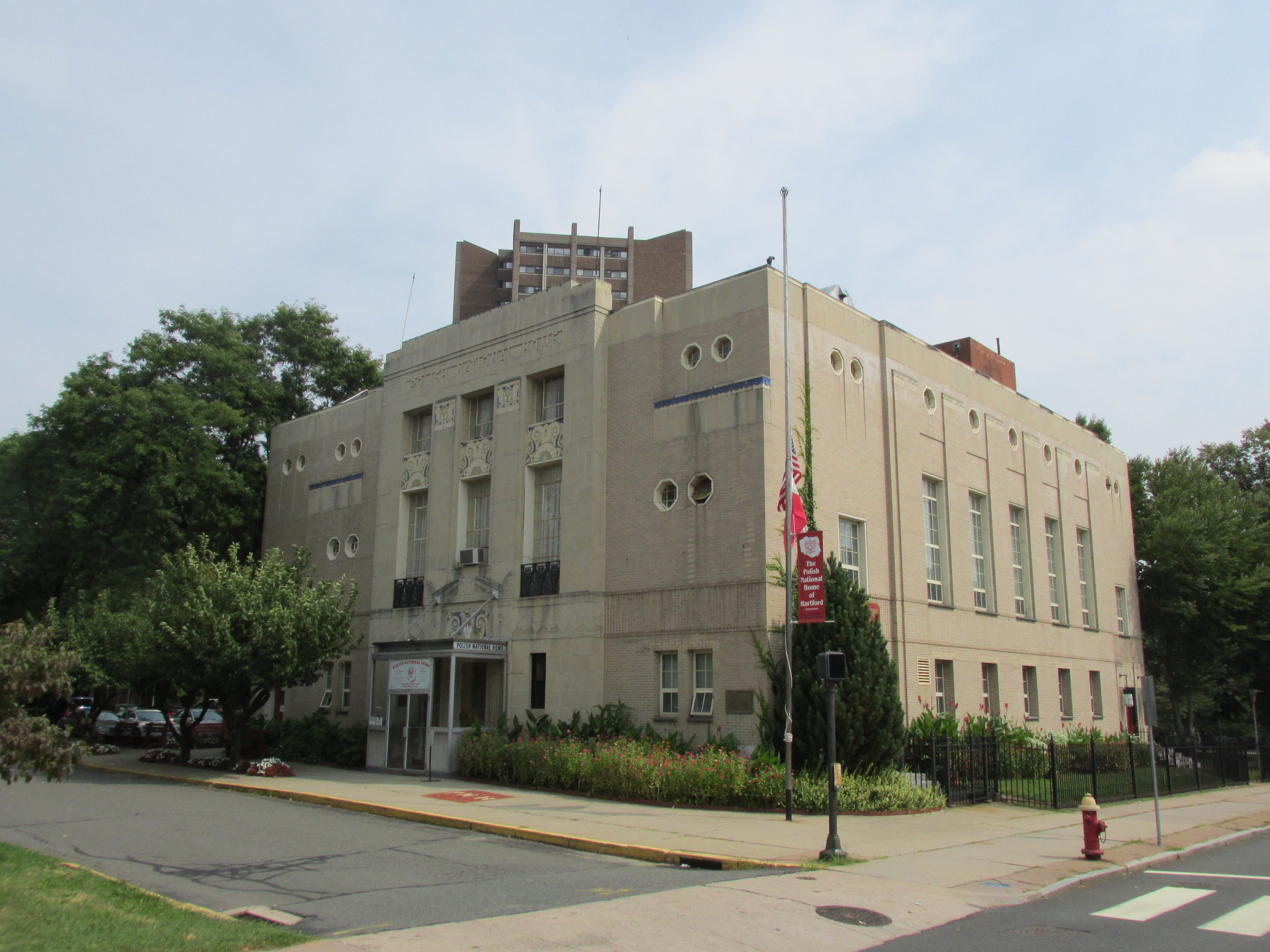

- Location within Connecticut Location within the United States
- Location: 60 Charter Oak Ave., Hartford, Connecticut
- Coordinates: 41°45′33″N 72°40′18″W
- Area: 1 acre (0.40 ha)
- Built: 1930
- Architect: Ludorf, Henry F.
- Architectural style: Art Deco
- NRHP reference No.: 83003566
- Added to NRHP: October 20, 1983

The Polish National Home is an ethnic community support organization in Hartford, Connecticut. Its facilities are located at 60 Charter Oak Avenue, south of downtown Hartford, in an architecturally distinctive Art Deco building. It was built in 1930 to a design by Polish-American architect Henry Ludorf, and was listed on the National Register of Historic Places in 1983.

== History ==
Polish immigrants began settling on Hartford southeast side as early as 1889, and the area soon developed as an ethnic enclave. The Roman Catholic Church of Sts Cyril and Methodius was established in 1902 as an early focus of the community. A number of social support organizations were also established, to lend assistance to arriving immigrants and provide mutual assistance. In 1917 the Polish National Corporation was founded as an umbrella for these efforts. In 1918, after the church moved to a new building, it occupied the church's old building. This organization changed its name to the Polish National Home Corporation in 1927, and solicited plans from Polish-American architects for construction of a new home. This project was awarded to Henry Ludorf, and the present edifice was built with funds raised from the local Polish community. It was dedicated in 1930, and served as a focal point for local Polish cultural events. A small, rather inconspicuous plaque displays the high water mark of the Flood of 1936.

On December 30, 2022, the Polish National Home building was sold to For His Glory Church Ministries.

== Architecture ==
Architecturally, the Home's building is a distinctive local example of Art Deco architecture. Its facades facing Charter Oak Avenue and Governor Street are finished in buff brick, with a central projecting entry section of ashlar concrete block. Eagle crests (the eagle being a symbol of Polish identity) are found above the entrance, and in panels above the windows in the projecting section. Stylized piers with Art Deco capitals separate the main windows on the Governor Street facade, and both facades have small octagonal windows placed at several levels. The octagonal pattern is repeated in the interior fixtures of the hall, which are also part of Ludorf's original design. The interior space is organized with a banquet hall, bar, and kitchen on the ground floor, and a large auditorium space on the second level.

== See also ==
- National Register of Historic Places listings in Hartford, Connecticut
