= George Capewell =

English-born American inventor

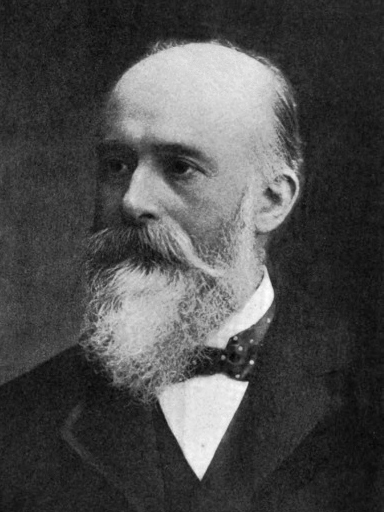
- Born: June 26, 1843; Birmingham, England
- Died: November 6, 1919 (aged 76)

George Joseph Capewell (June 26, 1843 – November 6, 1919) was an inventor and businessman who developed an automated process for the production of horse shoe nails and founded the Capewell Horse Nail Company.

== Biography ==
Capewell was born in Birmingham, England, and came to the United States in 1845. He was educated in Woodbury, Connecticut, and went to work at fifteen for the Scoville Manufacturing Company in Waterbury, Connecticut. At twenty he was Mechanical Superintendent of Cheshire Manufacturing Company.

In 1870 he founded a business manufacturing metal devices of his own invention. The most well known was the Capewell Giant Nail Puller. In 1876, he began the invention of an automated process to produce horse nails. After years of frustration, failure, and the loss of thousands of dollars, a perfected machine was exhibited to investors in Hartford, Connecticut, in the fall of 1880. In 1881, Capewell formed the Capewell Horse Nail Company in Hartford, making it the horshoe nail capital of the world.

In 1887, he established two companies in England; the Capewell Horse Shoe Nail Company (Limited) and the Capewell Continental Patent Company (Limited). He worked as director in both of the companies.

He had to rebuild his factory after fire destroyed the building in 1902.

Capewell was among the passengers who attended the maiden voyage of the RMS Lusitania in September 1907.

Due to worker shortages during World War I, Capewell began hiring female workers. He opened a free daycare at the factory so that mothers could work without leaving their children at home.

Capewell was the holder of over 100 patents including the Capewell Giant Nail puller (patented 1872); the Capewell self-fastening cone-button (patented 1866); electric trucks; anti-friction roller bearings, revolving wheel-fender for carriages; a machine for forming glass buttons and ornaments; and a machine for driving and pulling tacks and nails.

He died on November 6, 1919.

The company continued to manufacture nails in Bloomfield, Connecticut, on machines designed by Capewell until it closed in 2012.
