= Gordon Wilson =

Gordon Wilson may refer to:

== Politicians ==
- Gordon Wilson (British Columbia politician) (born 1949), Canadian politician, former leader of British Columbia Liberal Party
- Gordon Wilson (Nova Scotia politician) (born 1955), Canadian politician, member of the Nova Scotia House of Assembly
- Gordon Wilson (peace campaigner) (1927–1995), Irish peace campaigner and senator
- Gordon Wilson (Scottish politician) (1938–2017), leader of the Scottish National Party
- Gordon Crooks Wilson (1872–1937), Conservative and Unionist Party member of the Canadian House of Commons

== Sportspeople ==
- Phat Wilson (Gordon Allan Wilson, 1895–1970), Canadian ice-hockey player
- Gordon Wilson (American football) (1915–1997), American football player
- Gordon Wilson (footballer, born 1944), Scottish footballer
- Gordon Wilson (footballer, born 1904) (1904–1947), English footballer

== Other people ==
- Gordon Wilson (architect) (1900–1959), New Zealand architect
- Sir Gordon Wilson (British Army officer) (1887–1971), British Army officer
- Gordon Chesney Wilson (1865–1914), British Army officer
