= Fat (disambiguation) =

Fat is an oily or greasy organic substance.

Fat or FAT may also refer to:

== Health and sports ==
- Adipose tissue, also known as body fat
- As an adjective, overweight or having obesity
- FAT (gene), which encodes the protein protocadherin FAT1
- Female athlete triad, now known as relative energy deficiency in sport (RED-S)
- Football Association of Thailand, the governing body of football in Thailand
- Fully automatic time, a method of recording times during running events

== Arts and entertainment ==
=== Literature ===
- Fat (cookbook), by Jennifer McLagan
- Fat (novel), by Rob Grant
- "Fat", a short story from the collection Will You Please Be Quiet, Please? by Raymond Carver

=== Music ===
- Fat (EP), by American punk rock band the Descendents
- "Fat" (song), a parody by Weird Al Yankovic of Michael Jackson's "Bad"
- "Fat", a song by Violent Femmes from the album 3
- "Fat", a song by Lindemann from the album Skills in Pills

=== Television ===
- "Fat" (Law & Order: Special Victims Unit), an episode in season 7 of Law & Order: Special Victims Unit
- The Fat, a former Australian television sports talk show

=== Other uses in arts and entertainment ===
- Fat (film), a 2013 indie drama film
- Wo Fat, Steve McGarrett's archenemy in Hawaii Five-O (1968 TV series) and Hawaii Five-0 (2010 TV series)
- Fashion Architecture Taste, an art and architecture collective based in London

== Military and transportation ==
- Forces Armées Tchadiennes, the Chadian central government's forces until 1979
- Togolese Armed Forces (Forces Armées Togolaises) the National Military of Togo
- FAT (torpedo), a type of torpedo used by Germany during World War II
- Ashok Leyland FAT, a series of military trucks
- Field Artillery Tractor, a vehicle for towing field artillery
- Far Eastern Air Transport, an airline on Taiwan
- FAT, IATA code for Fresno Yosemite International Airport, California

== People ==
- Fan Fat, king of Champa (in what is now Vietnam) from 349 to 380
- Lafayette Fat Lever (born 1960), American National Basketball Association player
- Ralph Waldsmith (1892–1925), American football player in the early days of the National Football League, nicknamed "Fat"
- Andrew Wong (politician) (born 1943), politician known in Hong Kong as "Uncle Fat" (full name Andrew Wong Wang Fat)
- List of people known as the Fat

== Other uses ==
- Factory acceptance testing, acceptance testing prior to installation
- Frente Auténtico del Trabajo (Authentic Labor Front), a Mexican labor confederation
- File Allocation Table (FAT file system and its variants FAT12, FAT16 and FAT32), a computer file system architecture and a family of file systems utilizing it
- Fath, Iran, a village also known as "Fāt"
- FAT, ISO 639-2 and 639-3 codes for the Fante dialect (Mfantse, Fanti), a formal language (literary dialect) of the Akan language

== See also ==
- Free Art and Technology Lab or F.A.T. Lab, a New York-based artist group
- Fats (disambiguation)
- Fatty (disambiguation)
- Phat (disambiguation)
- Gordo (disambiguation), the Spanish and Portuguese word for "fat"
