= Fatty =

Fatty is a derogatory term for someone who is obese. It may refer also to:

== People ==
=== Nickname ===
- Roscoe Arbuckle (1887–1933), American actor and comedian
- Fatty Briody (1858–1903), American Major League Baseball player
- Bob Fothergill (1897–1938), American Major League Baseball outfielder
- William Foulke (footballer) (1874–1916), English cricketer and footballer
- Richard Lamb (1907–1974), Australian racing cyclist
- Fatty Lawrence (1903–1976), American college gridiron football player
- W. T. McLain (1885–1938), American college gridiron football player, lawyer and politician
- Charles H. Smith (American football), University of Michigan football player in 1893–1894
- Fatty Taylor (1946–2017), retired American Basketball Association and National Basketball Association player
- Paul Vautin (born 1959), Australian former rugby league footballer and coach, television presenter and commentator
- Thomas Walsh (mobster) (died 1929), New York City mobster
- Fatty Warren (1898–1946), college football player

=== Other ===
- Mai Fatty, Gambian politician
- Fatty George, Austrian jazz musician Franz Georg Pressler (1927–1982)
- April Flores, American pornographic actress also known as Fatty Delicious and Fatty D

== Fictional characters ==
- The titular character of Fatty Finn, a long-running Australian comic strip
- Fatty Fudge, in "Minnie the Minx" in the UK's The Beano comic
- Frederick "Fatty" Brown, in "The Bash Street Kids" in the UK's The Beano comic
- Frederick Algernon Trotteville, in Enid Blyton's Five Find-Outers series of mystery novels
- One of the titular characters of Fatty and George, a 1981 Australian children's television series

== See also ==
- Mike "Prince Fatty" Pelanconi, British sound engineer and record producer
- Fat (disambiguation)
- Fats (disambiguation), including a list of people with the nickname
- Skinny (disambiguation)
