= Phat =

Phat is modern English slang for "very good". It is derived from African-American Vernacular English.

Historically it was an occasional alternative spelling for "fat". It may also refer to:

== Leisure activities ==
- Phat (card game), a variant of the game All-Fours
- Phat (comics), a fictional character in Marvel comics

== People ==
- Phat Watts (born 1999), American football player
- Huỳnh Tấn Phát (1913–1989), South Vietnamese politician and revolutionary
- Lâm Văn Phát (1920–1998), Vietnamese army officer
- Phat Wilson (1895–1970), Canadian amateur ice hockey player
- Richard Temple-Nugent-Brydges-Chandos-Grenville, 1st Duke of Buckingham and Chandos (1776–1839), nicknamed Phat Duke

== See also ==
- Fat (disambiguation)
- Phat Farm, a designer clothing company
