= Gordo =

Gordo may refer to:

== People ==
=== Nickname ===
- Afonso II of Portugal (1185–1223), King of Portugal nicknamed "o Gordo" ("the Fat")
- Agustín Calleri (born 1976), Argentine retired tennis player
- Gordon Cooper (1927–2004), one of the seven original American astronauts
- John Gordon (sportscaster) (born 1940), retired Major League Baseball radio broadcaster
- Kaio de Almeida (born 1984), Brazilian swimmer nicknamed "Gordo" as a child

=== Surname ===
- David Gordo, Spanish football manager
- João Gordo (born 1964), Brazilian vocalist and TV host
- Ricardo María Carles Gordó (1926–2013), Roman Catholic cardinal priest and Archbishop Emeritus of Barcelona

=== Other people ===
- Gordo (DJ), Guatemalan-American DJ and record producer
- Gordon Lish (born 1934), American writer and editor who used the pseudonym "Gordo Lockwood"

== Places ==
- Gordo, Alabama, United States, a town
- Monte Gordo (Cape Verde), the highest point on the island of São Nicolau, Cape Verde
- Gordo, a hill or mountain in Añasco, Puerto Rico

== In entertainment ==
- Gordo (comic strip), a comic strip (1941–1985) created by Gus Arriola
- David "Gordo" Gordon, a character from the Disney sitcom Lizzie McGuire
- Eddy Gordo, a character from the Tekken series of fighting games
- Gordo, a gluttonous Black Pirate in the video game Skies of Arcadia
- Gordo, an undead abomination in the Warcraft Universe
- Gordo, a fictional character from the anime series Beyblade V-Force
- Gordo, a common enemy character from the Kirby video game franchise
- Mr. Gordo, the name of Buffy Summers' stuffed pig in Buffy the Vampire Slayer

== Other uses ==
- Gordo High School, Gordo, Alabama
- Gordo (monkey), the first monkey to travel beyond Earth's orbit
- Gordo (dinosaur), a dinosaur specimen of the genus Barosaurus
- Chipotle, also called gordo in Mexico
- Gordo, another name for the Muscat of Alexandria grape

== See also ==
- El Gordo (disambiguation)
- Gordos, a 2009 film
