= Beyblade season 1 =

Beyblade
- Season 1
- The cover of the first DVD compilation of Beyblade.
- No. of episodes: 51

Release
- Original network: TV Tokyo
- Original release: January 8 – December 24, 2001

Season chronology
- Next → V-Force

Beyblade is the first season of the 2001 Japanese collaboration anime television series Beyblade based on Takao Aoki's manga series of the same name, which itself is based on the Beyblade spinning top game from Takara Tomy. The 51-episode season was produced by Madhouse under the direction of Toshifumi Kawase.

The series was first broadcast on TV Tokyo in Japan from January 8 to December 24, 2001. The season was licensed for English adaptation, broadcast, and release by Nelvana. The series was broadcast on the sibling cable channel YTV in Canada and ABC Family in the United States in 2002.

The opening theme is "Fighting Spirits – Song for Beyblade" by System-B while the ending theme is "Cheer Song" by System-B. For the English version, the opening and ending themes are "Let's Beyblade!" by Sick Kid ft. Lucas Rossi.

== Episode list ==
No.	Title	Original release date	English air date
1	"The Blade Raider"; Transliteration: "Bakuten Batoru, Gō Shūto!" (Japanese: 爆転バトル、ゴー・シュート!)	January 8, 2001	July 6, 2002
Takao Kinomiya (Tyson Granger in the English dub and the versions based on it) realizes he is running late for a Beyblade battle with Akira (Andrew in the English dub and the versions based on it), the best Beyblader in town. Before Takao gets there, a member of the "Shell Killers" ("Blade Sharks" in the English dub) named Hiruta (Carlos in the English dub and the versions based on it) fights and defeats him, taking his blade. Takao arrives and snaps, challenging him to a battle at 3:00 by the river next day. A boy named Manabu Saien "Kyouju" (Kenny "The Chief" in the English dub and the versions based on it) becomes friends with Takao, and they realize that they need a faster Beyblade to defeat Hiruta's heavier one. Takao attempts and almost gives up until he has a vision of the Great Dragoon Spirit, a power that has been in the family from generations. With new inspiration, Takao defeats Hiruta with a newly developed technique. Before Hiruta can escape with his stolen Beyblades, his leader Kai appears and strikes him down for his failure. Disgusted by Kai's callous attitude, Takao challenges him to a battle.
2	"Day of the Dragoon"; Transliteration: "Hoero Seiryū! Doragūn Tanjō!" (Japanese: ほえろ青龍! ドラグーン誕生!)	January 15, 2001	July 6, 2002
Takao's Blade is destroyed by Kai due to the latter's Bit-Beast Dranzer. Andrew and Kyojyu inform him that the Shell Killers are looking for the ultimate Bit-Beast nobody can beat. Andrew, Kyojyu and Takao rebuild Takao's Bey. Meanwhile, Kai then orders Hiruta's beyblade to be destroyed as punishment. After destroying Hiruta's bey, Kai's goons; Suzuka (Stewart in the English dub and the versions based on it), Tsukuba (Casey in the English dub and the versions based on it), and Motegi (Trevor in the English dub and the versions based on it) kidnap Kyojyu to use his laptop to find the ultimate Bey. Takao asks the Dragoon for guidance when Dragoon goes right into his Bey. Takao then re-challenges Kai, and they draw.
3	"Take It to the Max!"; Transliteration: "Atarashiki Tomo, Sononaha Makkusu" (Japanese: 新しき友、その名はマックス)	January 22, 2001	July 7, 2002
Takao and Kyojyu meet Max Mizuhara (Max Tate in the English dub and the versions based on it), the new kid in town, just before a puppy is washed away to a waterfall. Takao attempts to save him, but fails. Max then tries, and succeeds. Max and Takao battle in Max's dad's shop, but Max wins, due to his defensive-type Beyblade. Kogorou Daitokuji (president of the BBA (Beyblade Battle Association), named Stanley A. Dickinson in the English dub and the versions based on it) then arrives and informs them of the Beyblade Battle Tournament, and they are all looking forward to it. Kyojyu and Takao argue over Takao's cockiness that his Bey need not be improved. Takao then attempts to control the Dragoon, and succeeds, while Kyojyu is watching through the window. They then become friends again.
4	"The Qualifier Begins"; Transliteration: "Kaimaku! Batoru Tōnamento!" (Japanese: 開幕! バトルトーナメント!)	January 29, 2001	July 13, 2002
The Beyblade Regional Qualifying Tournament begins as Takao, Max, and even Kyojyu enter to see if they can dethrone Kai, the reigning champion. Max wins his block, and advances to the finals. Kyojyu is second but without a Bit-Beast in his blade, he falls quickly to Kai, angering Takao. Takao battles third, against Motegi, Suzuka, Tsukuba (Alternately, the 3 goons who kidnapped Kyoujyu) and Hiruta. Hiruta then destroys one of his partners' Beys, leaving it between Takao and Hiruta. Takao ends up winning, and is a good sport to Hiruta. Rei Kon (Ray Kon in the English dub and the versions based on it) is introduced at the end of the episode.
5	"Draciel of Approval"; Transliteration: "Gekitotsu! Makkusu VS Kai" (Japanese: 激突! マックスVSカイ)	February 5, 2001	July 20, 2002
In the semifinals, Max goes up against Kai, the champion while Takao looks forward to fighting Rei, an undefeated Blader. The dish for Max's battle against Kai is based around a tower; the winner is determined by being the first to stay on the top for 10 seconds. The first round goes quickly, with Max being defeated by Kai's Spin Fire attack. But in the second round, Max uses a reverse launch strategy, which absorbs Kai's Spin Fire attack, allowing him to win. Max's Bey then explodes due to the energy overload. Max then finds a Bit-Beast chip inside his Grandma's pendant and embeds it within his reconstructed Beyblade. Max and Kai fight fiercely, but Max loses. Takao cheers Max up with the fact that he now has a Bit-Beast, and he can't wait for his battle with Rei.
6	"Dragoon Storm"; Transliteration: "Fukiarero! Doragūn Sutōmu!" (Japanese: 吹き荒れろ!ドラグーンストーム!)	February 12, 2001	July 20, 2002
The final battle of the semifinals is Takao versus Rei, an undefeated Blader. Kenny is working on something, and is not there for the first round. Tyson and Rei clash, but Rei easily beats Takao with his stronger Bit Beast, Driger and his Tiger Claw attack, destroying Takao's Bey. Kenny shows up before he forfeits, and Tyson's Bey is fixed with a new Defense Ring Kenny was working on. The second round is ferocious, but Tyson's Defense Ring pulls through, despite not being built for attacking. Rei forfeits the third match, saying he has nothing left to prove, and joins the team. The finals are decided – Tyson versus Kai.
7	"Thirteen Candles"; Transliteration: "Takao VS Kai, Shukumei no Taiketsu!" (Japanese: タカオVSカイ、宿命の対決!)	February 19, 2001	July 21, 2002
Takao, Max, and Manabu are working on Dragoon to ensure victory in the finals when Ryunosuke interrupts and reveals to Tyson that it is his 13th birthday! After the party, the first round ends quickly, with Tyson unexpectedly defeating Kai. Kai then goes harder on Tyson and easily defeats him in the second round. The third round is explosive, with Tyson just managing to defeat Kai, and become the National Beyblade Champion. Mr. Daitokuji then reveals to Tyson, Kai, Max, Kenny, and Rei that they will become a team and participate in the World Championships.
8	"Bladin' in the Streets"; Transliteration: "Kessei! BBA Chīmu, Sekai e" (Japanese: 結成! BBAチーム、世界へ)	February 26, 2001	July 27, 2002
As Takao, Kai, Max, Kyojyu, and Rei fly to Hong Kong to prepare for the Asian Tournament, Kai "quits" the team and walks into the streets. The rest of the team try to follow him and fail when they hear a Bey spinning, and find a back-alley Beyblader challenging them to a battle. Takao battles and manages to just defeat him, when another Beyblade, belonging to a boy named Kevin, knocks Dragoon out of the stadium and nearly hits Rei (Kai then reappears and knocks Dragoon out of his way).
9	"Showdown in Hong Kong"; Transliteration: "Aratanaru Seijū, Byakko Zoku" (Japanese: 新たなる聖獣、白虎族)	March 5, 2001	July 28, 2002
Kevin disses the Bladebreakers (especially Rei) and challenges Rei to a battle. Takao has had enough and battles Kevin instead, but he falls quickly to the Bey's ability to wobble and multiply. The Blader who challenged Takao beforehand bumps into Lee, Gao (Gary in the English dub and versions based upon it) and Mariah, the other members of the White Tigers, and he tells them about his encounter with Rei. Takao then beats Kevin in battle, before the rest of the White Tigers show up. They all seem to know Rei, calling him "traitor", and tell him that they will be entering the tournament too.
10	"Battle in the Sky"; Transliteration: "Kake Agare! Ajia Taikai!" (Japanese: 駆け上がれ! アジア大会!)	March 12, 2001	August 3, 2002
The BBA Asian Tournament is underway, at the peak of an unbelievably high tower in China. The Bladebreakers and the White Tigers realize that they will eventually battle each other, and they use this against each other. First up, the Bladebreakers versus the Tall Boys. The Bladebreakers manage to scrape through to the next round, despite some of the Tall Boys' Beys having spikes and being able to generate heat. First of all, Ray was against Andre, who has the power of the Yak, secondly Max was up against Waylan, whose got his blade's power of heat, and finally Tyson against Tommy, the Tall Boys' leader, who uses the power of the Muay Thai Kick. They then check out Mariah's Galux Bit-Beast, from the White Tigers, and Takao can't wait for their fight.
11	"Bye Bye Bit Beast"; Transliteration: "Rei, Byakko o Ushinau!" (Japanese: レイ、白虎を失う!)	March 19, 2001	August 4, 2002
With Kyojyu working all night before the day of the Tournament, Kevin from the White Tigers tries to sneak into where they're sleeping and steal and/or destroy Rei's Driger. With a speech from Mariah, Kevin cannot do it, but instead steals one of Kyojyu's data disks while he's making tea. Rei confronts him before he can escape and they battle for the disk. Rei, however, gets distracted by Kevin's plea for mercy and Driger escapes from his Bey. Luckily, Takao then battles Kevin and beats him, getting the disk back but leaving Kai disappointed with Rei and Rei with himself.
12	"Adios Bladebreakers"; Transliteration: "Saraba BBA Chīmu!" (Japanese: さらばBBAチーム!)	March 26, 2001	August 10, 2002
Rei leaves the Bladebreakers and journeys into the mountains to try to get Driger back. Mariah finds him, beats him in battle, confronts him about his stupidity and asks him to come back to the White Tigers. The other Bladebreakers discover that Rei has gone, and Takao and Max venture off into the mountains. Rei nearly goes back to the White Tigers when Takao and Max find him. Takao challenges him to a battle, and if Rei wins he can do whatever he wants. Takao, however, loses to Rei. When Rei discovers the Bladebreakers wanted him back without a Bit Beast, Rei goes back to the Bladebreakers.
13	"Crouching Lion, Hidden Tiger"; Transliteration: "Sakebe Rei! Unare Byakko!" (Japanese: さけべレイ! うなれ白虎!)	April 2, 2001	August 11, 2002
The White Tigers face the Spin Shepherds. Due to hunger, Gao loses to one member called Bobby. Mariah manages to destroy Doug's bey. But when Lee uses Rei's special move, Rei is forced to open up about their past. Driger had been passed down from generation to generation, and Rei was chosen instead of Lee. Rei then left to pick up new skills. A challenge is set, whichever team wins in the finals gets Driger. The Bladebreakers face up against the Charming Princes, and Takao, Max and Rei destroy them, with Rei finally getting Driger back.
14	"The Race Is On!"; Transliteration: "Fusenpai? Bundan no BBA Chīmu" (Japanese: 不戦敗? 分断のBBAチーム)	April 9, 2001	August 17, 2002
It's the morning of the semi-finals at the Asian Beyblade Tournament and Takao manages to sleep in. The rest of the team leaves early, but Rei stays behind to make sure Takao wakes up. As the tournament gets underway, Max is the first to battle. Meanwhile, Rei and Takao are caught up in a traffic jam created by a landslide (caused by Kevin), so they decide to walk. But the shortest route is over a mountain where Rei sprains his ankle and Takao is left to carry him all the way to the tournament. Meanwhile, back at the tournament, Team Bladebreakers has heard about the landslide and are worried about their teammates. And to add insult to injury, if Takao doesn't show up soon, their team will have to forfeit. Time is running out for Takao and Rei, when Kai uncharacteristically steps up to the plate to stall for time until Takao shows up.
15	"Going for the Gold"; Transliteration: "Kessen! Ajia no Chōten o Kakete!" (Japanese: 決戦! アジアの頂点をかけて!)	April 16, 2001	August 18, 2002
The finals are about to begin in the Asian Qualifying Tournament with the winning team advancing to the World BeyBlade Championships. In the first round, Max goes against Gao from the White Tigers in a best of three battle. The first round goes without a hitch as Max easily takes care of his opponent and with the win, Max becomes a little overconfident. Meanwhile, Gao loses it and as his rage intensifies, so does the strength of his Galzzy Bit Beast. In the second round, Gao surprises Max with his blade's newfound power, and after Max puts up a respectable defense, Max finally falls prey to Gao's Galzzy. Now the Bladebreakers realize they're not quite as tough as they think they are, and when they enter the ring for the final round, they try a new strategy. But Gao has other plans and makes quick work of defeating his opponent handing a first round loss to the Bladebreakers.
16	"My Enemy, My Friend"; Transliteration: "Byakko VS Yamaneko" (Japanese: 白虎VS山猫)	April 23, 2001	August 24, 2002
In the second round of the finals of the Asian Tournament, Rei faces off against his old teammate, and former friend, Mariah. When Galux and Driger team up to show the pair a glimpse of the happiness they shared in the past, Rei and Mariah come to realize how much they have lost to their rivalry. Rei makes a promise to Mariah before he wins the match that no matter what happens, they'll stay friends.
17	"A Score to Settle"; Transliteration: "Fainaru Batoru! Shikkoku no Inazuma!" (Japanese: ファイナルバトル! 漆黒の稲妻!)	April 30, 2001	August 25, 2002
The final match of the Asian Beyblade Tournament reaches an uncertain conclusion when Takao and Lee's decisive battle ends in a draw. The resulting sudden death session between Rei and Lee rekindles the pair's old hometown grievances. Rei manages to defeat Lee and the two of them make up.
18	"A Star Is Born"; Transliteration: "Makeruna! Chīsana Burēdā" (Japanese: 負けるな! 小さなブレーダー)	May 7, 2001	August 31, 2002
Fresh from the Bladebreakers win in Asia, Takao comes home and once again meets his friends, Andrew and Billy, and then realizes he's on the front page news. With his ego out of control, Takao takes on the attitude of a rock star, which upsets Kyojyu who tries to keep him focused on blading and not his popularity. Meanwhile, at a local playground, the local kids are all out Beyblading when Takao spots a kid named Nicky, being handled easily in the Beystadium by a bully named Riley. After Nicky's blade is completely destroyed, Takao vows to help the kid fix it and fight his way back. After enlisting the help of Max, Kyojyu and Dizzi, Takao manages to rebuild Nicky's blade and they return to the playground where they find Riley and immediately demand a rematch. With the knowledge of the Bladebreakers backing Nicky, he quickly takes care of Riley. Meanwhile, in a conspiratorial meeting at Kai's grandfather's mansion, he spells out Kai's next assignment: "to fight all the Beyblades that possess the bit beasts within them". Kai walks out of the room speechless and says to himself he will that he'll get "what he wants" and he will be crowned "the undisputed Beyblade champion of the World".
19	"Under the Microscope"; Transliteration: "Jōriku, Aratana Senjō!" (Japanese: 上陸、新たな戦場!)	May 14, 2001	September 1, 2002
The Bladebreakers arrive in the USA for the American Tournament. During a tour of a BBA research facility, Max is shocked to learn that his Mom (Judy Tate) works there, and not at a college, like he thought. Also, the team discovers that they are being tested for weaknesses, by a competing team. Although Takao and Rei easily beat their opponents, Max is easily defeated by his mother's assistant, Emily, who uses her tennis racket as a launcher.
20	"It's All Relative"; Transliteration: "Senritsu no Amerikan Pawā!" (Japanese: 戦慄のアメリカン・パワー!)	May 21, 2001	September 7, 2002
After their non-competition loss to Emily of the All Starz at the BBA Research Center, the Bladebreakers sneak around the high-tech facility, hoping to learn more about their competition. There, they confront two other All Starz called Eddie and Steve (who use respectively, a basketball and an American football as launchers), and Max learns more about his Mom's job at the BBA – specifically, a rumor of why Max wasn't asked to join the All Starz Team.
21	"Practice Makes Perfect!"; Transliteration: "Tokkun! Atarashiki Chikara o Motomete" (Japanese: 特訓! 新しき力を求めて)	May 28, 2001	September 8, 2002
Kaichou sends the Bladebreakers to a remote mountain retreat to hone their blading skills for the upcoming American Tournament as well as to get Kyojyu and Dizzi to figure out a way to increase Rei's Bit-Beast's power. Once there, they meet up with an enthusiastic young boy named Antonio who they think is there to train them. It turns out that Antonio is a weak blader. Frustrated, the Breakers question the reason why Kaichou would send them all the way up to the middle of nowhere to train without any decent equipment. Turns out, the BBA Chairman had an ulterior motive – to teach the boys a lesson about the importance of practice. Even Kyojyu learns from this and is able to tweak Rei's blade up a few notches.
22	"Blading with the Stars"; Transliteration: "Daitōryō VS Sekai Senbatsu!" (Japanese: 大統領VS世界選抜!)	June 4, 2001	September 14, 2002
A charity event in the Heartland of America gives the Bladebreakers a taste of the All Starz's prowess. Featuring celebrities in a three-on-three contest against young Beybladers of note, Emily of the All Starz, bullies her way to an easy win. It's not until Emily knocks out her own opponent, loses the second match and is on her way to throwing the whole competition, that Max teaches her a lesson about teamwork. All Starz's team leader, Michael, is also introduced in this episode.
23	"Showdown in Vegas"; Transliteration: "Kaimaku! Amerika Taikai" (Japanese: 開幕!アメリカ大会)	June 11, 2001	September 15, 2002
The Bladebreakers arrive in Las Vegas for the start of the American Tournament. Takao looks forward to facing off against the arrogant All Starz, and their scientifically advanced Beyblades – but first his team needs to get past the Hispanic beybladers, The Renegades in the qualifying round. Kai surprises everyone by stepping into the dish for the first battle after being confronted by Emily about his apparent coldness towards his team mates – Kai wants to give her a chance to know what he's made of, but it was only a plan so that the All Starz could study his skills. However, Kai beats his opponent so fast that Emily is unable to record any data. Max and Takao also defeat their opponents, though not as quickly as Kai.
24	"Viva Las Vegas"; Transliteration: "Amerikan Hīrō Maikeru no Chikara!" (Japanese: アメリカンヒーロー マイケルの力!)	June 18, 2001	September 21, 2002
The Bladebreakers have advanced to the second round of the American Tournament where they square off against the Savage Slammers. The winner of this round advances to the semi-finals. Their competition first appears to be a bunch of slackers, but when Rei loses out in the first round, they quickly realize what they're up against. Max is next, and for some odd reason, his rival folds under pressure, so the best of three is tied at one a piece with Takao coming in for the deciding battle. At first it looks like a quick win for the Slammers simply because of the size of his opponents enormous Beyblade and things get even more tense when Takao begins to lose his temper and his focus. The other Breakers convince him to concentrate and when he does, Takao pull off the victory. Next, the Bladebreakers decide to check out the American Team who are competing in another stadium. That's where they get their first taste of the ultra-inflated ego of the All Starz's captain, Michael.
25	"My Way or the Highway"; Transliteration: "Junkesshō, Chō Kōsoku Sākitto!" (Japanese: 準決勝、超高速サーキット!)	June 25, 2001	September 22, 2002
It's the Bladebreakers versus Spintensity in the semi-finals of the American Tournament. But before the match can begin, Takao is forced to withdraw with a stomachache which he got from too much celebratory eating. Kai replaces him and the trio advance to the final round after a perfect three at the whirlwind, highway-themed dish called the New Jersey Turnpike.
26	"Catch a Shooting All-Star!"; Transliteration: "Gekitotsu! Amerika Taikai Kesshōsen" (Japanese: 激突! アメリカ大会決勝戦)	July 2, 2001	September 27, 2002
Tensions rise as the American Tournament heats up. Max fights for a chance to Beyblade against his mother's team (the All Starz) in an upcoming match, while Takao and the rest of the Bladebreakers realize that the All Starz are a bigger threat then they previously thought. At the end of two tense rounds, Takao and Steve are tied one-all.
27	"The Battle of America"; Transliteration: "Shakunetsu no Sukōpion!!" (Japanese: 灼熱のスコーピオン!!)	July 9, 2001	September 28, 2002
It's the finals of the American Tournament and the Bladebreakers are going head to head with the All Starz with the winner going to the World Championships. In the first round, Takao is pitted against Steve and at first, things don't appear to be going Takao's way. But with sheer determination, Takao pulls out a victory that puts the Bladebreakers ahead 1–0 in the best of three finals. The second round isn't quite so easy as Rei squares off against the NBA wannabe named Eddy, whose blazing fast basketball style attack quickly knocks him out and evens the score at one a piece. Now the stage is set for the final battle, and Max is chosen to fight Michael.
28	"Bottom of the Ninth"; Transliteration: "Ketchaku! Amerika Taikai!!" (Japanese: 決着! アメリカ大会!!)	July 16, 2001	October 5, 2002
The deciding match of the American Tournament Finals comes down to Max vs. Michael of the 'All Starz'. The beystadium for the final round is a replica of a baseball diamond – Michael's favorite ball sport. After an intense battle, with Michael recurring to a fastball launch at the final round, Max wins and prove his mother that science and technology are not always enough to ensure victory.
29	"Play It Again Dizzi!"; Transliteration: "BBA Atsuki Tatakai no Kiseki!!" (Japanese: BBA 熱き戦いの軌跡)	July 23, 2001	October 6, 2002
After narrowly defeating the All Starz at the American Tournament, Kyojyu decides he should record a database of the highs and low points of the Bladebreakers since the very beginning. In fact, through a series of flashbacks, Kyojyu along with Dizzi, takes a trip down memory lane as far back to the first time he ever met Takao. With clips from various shows, Kyojyu narrates the progress of his friends who eventually form the Bladebreakers and go on to the Asian Tournament. After watching the progress of his team, evaluating individual battles to eventually winning the American Tournament, Kyojyu concludes that they really have come a long way in a very short time. And just when he thinks they've reached the pinnacle of their success, Max, Takao and Rei show up to take Kyojyu to board the ship that's about to take them to the World Championships in Russia.
30	"Cruising for a Bruising"; Transliteration: "Seijū o Shitagaeru Mono" (Japanese: 聖獣を従える者)	July 30, 2001	October 12, 2002
The Bladebreakers travel by boat across the Atlantic, where Kyojyu discover he suffers from seasickness. Meanwhile, he wants the Bladebreakers to evolve – however, they don't have any good opponents around and there's no use in battling each other since there will be no surprises. Meanwhile, an arrogant unknown Beyblader at the ship's cargo depot is challenged by some amateur players. He destroys every beyblade used against him, and Takao arrives in time to see him breaking one last beyblade in two with just one hit. Takao challenges him and releases Dragoon to make it clear he's no amateur. However, his opponent reveals his own bit beast, the much larger Griffolyon, and easily throws Takao's Beyblade out of the stadium. He then introduces himself as Ralf (Robert in the English dub and the versions based on it) and the Bladebreakers realize not all good Beybladers are taking part of the World Championship and the defeat exposes the team's vulnerability going into the Russian Tournament.
31	"London Calling"; Transliteration: "Yōroppa, Haran no Tabidachi" (Japanese: ヨーロッパ、波乱の旅立ち)	August 6, 2001	October 19, 2002
The kids are tricked by an old man into missing their boat, forcing them to spend the night in London where a mysterious videotape of Takao's father is delivered to them. Later, Takao's Beyblade is stolen and the kids are lured into a fight with the evil Cenotaph and his powerful Bit-Beast, Sarcopholon. Kai then appears and defeats the mummy by using his own strengths against him. The team agree to travel by land, learning from every European Beyblader they can find.
32	"Darkness at the End of the Tunnel..."; Transliteration: "Kyōshū! Yami no Burēdā!" (Japanese: 強襲! 闇のブレーダー!)	August 13, 2001	October 20, 2002
After their train is mysteriously hijacked, the kids find themselves in the dark recesses of a tunnel. This is where the Bladebreakers meet a foursome of zombie-like ghouls, the Dark Bladers. Cenotaph grabs Kyojyu and his three teammates challenge the Bladebreakers for a fight in order to release Kyojyu. However, if they lose, they'll have their Bit-Beasts captured. Max and Takao face off against Sanguinex and Lupinex, a vampire and werewolf, respectively. By making an "X" sign with their Beyblades, they manage to beat Sanguinex, since vampires are scared of crosses. Rei then joins in with a silver coin attached to his Beyblade in order to unleash a silver-version of Driger that weakens Lupinex's blade. When Cenotaph and Zomb are just about to start their rounds, an ambulance arrives, forcing the Dark Bladers to flee.
33	"Last Tangle in Paris"; Transliteration: "Kuroi Kage no Gundan" (Japanese: 黒い影の軍団)	August 20, 2001	October 26, 2002
As the Bladebreakers make their way to the World Championships in Russia, they are stuck in Paris where they end up wasting a day looking for Kai who had mysteriously disappeared. Takao comes up with the idea of using the Eiffel Tower as a vantage point to speed up their search. Rei, Kyojyu, Takao and Max make their way to the observation deck of the tower where they are again confronted by the Dark Bladers, who have vowed to steal the Bladebreakers' Bit-Beasts, as part of their ultimate plan to capture all Bit-Beasts in the world. A massive battle ensues but the odds are against the Bladebreakers. Finally, Kai shows up with his newly modified Dranzer and, as an unknown kid watches from behind a corner, almost single-handedly wins the battle. The Dark Bladers fade away after their loss. The unknown kid appears to the Bladebreakers and introduces himself as Oliver. Raised in Paris, he tells the Bladebreakers they did good, but they could do more with the power of their Bit Beasts. He then walks away.
34	"Art Attack"; Transliteration: "Kareinaru Seijū Tsukai" (Japanese: 華麗なる聖獣使い)	August 27, 2001	October 27, 2002
The Bladebreakers spend an extra day in Paris and split up to see the sights. Rei catches up with his uncle, Max goes on a wild shopping spree, and Kai goes in search of information about Oliver. Takao and Kyojyu try to see the Louvre but end up meeting Oliver, again, who rented an entire gallery just for himself to contemplate the works of art. Oliver is the son of a French millionaire who owns a number of restaurants. A chef himself, Oliver is also the French Beyblading champion. Kyojyu suggest both should have a fight, which ends in a tie. Oliver mentions a group of four European champions and says they should go to Italy meet his friend and undefeated national champion Enrique.
35	"When in Rome... Beyblade!"; Transliteration: "Korosseo no Kettō!" (Japanese: コロッセオの決闘!)	September 3, 2001	November 2, 2002
The Bladebreakers arrive in Rome, searching for the local champion Enrique. Scoffing at their Beyblade challenge, Enrique decides he would rather spend the day with some of his lady-friends. But Takao soon convinces him to battle. Enrique accepts and the match takes place in his personalised Beystadium, modeled after the Colosseum. Enrique, dressed up in an actual Roman centurion uniform, soon unleashes his bit-beast Amphilyon, which has two heads and, as such, battles as if it was controlling two Beyblades at the same time. Eventually, Amphilyon tries to attack Takao himself, forcing Dragoon to block it with its body, costing Takao the match.
36	"Déjà Vu All Over Again"; Transliteration: "Taose! Anpisubaina" (Japanese: 倒せ!アンピスバイナ)	September 10, 2001	November 3, 2002
Unwilling to let his initial defeat to Enrique faze him, Takao gets busy reworking his Beyblade. With Enrique having doubts about his own technique, and Oliver visiting him in Rome from France, the stage is set for a rematch. This time, Takao pits the two heads of Enrique's Bit Beast Amphilyon against each other, and saves Enrique's life when Amphilyon turns on him for being so ruthless and treating it like a slave. Enrique eventually loses, but learns to respect his own Bit-Beast.
37	"A Knight to Remember!"; Transliteration: "Joōheika no Burēdā" (Japanese: 女王陛下のブレーダー)	September 17, 2001	November 9, 2002
Enrique and Oliver decide to take the Bladebreakers on a dirigible ride to visit Ralf's castle, so that Takao can have a rematch. Takao's patience, however, is tested when they have to sit and wait for their host who is 'not to be disturbed'. So, Takao decides to find Ralf on his own and ends up getting lost in the medieval castles' many eerie secret passages. Finally, everyone converges in the room where Ralf is playing chess against the fourth member of the group mentioned by Oliver: Johnny, the arrogant Scottish champion. Takao challenges Ralf to a rematch, but Ralf refuses, stating that once you defeat your opponent, they simply cease to exist, and goes into a history lesson about his family and how Griffolyon has been passed on from generation to generation. Eventually, Johnny decides to pick a battle with Kai. As the fight begins, it appears to be even, but Johnny, dressed like a warrior, calls out his family's Bit-Beast Salamulyon and easily wins the match, leaving Kai speechless and shocked. In the end, the Bladebreakers resolve that they have their work cut out for them to become the world champion Beybladers.
38	"Olympia Challenge"; Transliteration: "Kessei! Saikyō no Yūro Chīmu" (Japanese: 結成!最強のユーロチーム)	September 24, 2001	November 9, 2002
The Bladebreakers have made themselves at home at Ralf's mansion, refusing to leave unless the Europeans agree to a final Beybattle. To teach his guests a lesson, Ralf agrees to battle them under the condition that if the Bladebreakers lose, they have to forfeit their berth at the World Championship to them. Ralf hosts the three-round match at his newly built stadium and makes it the inaugural event, with an entire audience and even the presence of DJ Jazzman and TV narrators AJ Topper & Brad Best. Introduced as the Majestics, the four Europeans send Oliver as the first challenger, with Rei as his opponent. They battle fiercely for the first round, but it ends in a tie. Johnny and Kai then step to the bowl, where they are expected to their rematch.
39	"A Majestic Battle... a Majestic Victory?"; Transliteration: "Kimero! Shōri e no Chikara" (Japanese: 決めろ! 勝利への力)	October 1, 2001	November 9, 2002
Match two gets underway at the Olympia Coliseum, and with both fighters getting unsolicited help from their respective teammates, Kai manages to defeat Johnny. Both leave the bowl criticizing their colleagues' attitude, while Enrique reflects on how the Majestics have always been just a group of undefeated Beybladers, while the Bladebreakers work better as a team due to their team dynamic. Takao and Ralf battle toe-to-toe, but Takao wins and the Majestics learn a lesson about teamwork. The Dark Bladers, who have held Kyojyu hostage at the stands, announce they have given up their evil plans. Kaichou appears and reveals that he was the old man who tricked them into missing their boat, as part of a plan to force them to explore Europe and its talented beybladers.
40	"Hot Battle in a Cold Town"; Transliteration: "Kesshō no Ji Roshia" (Japanese: 決勝の地ロシア)	October 8, 2001	April 12, 2003
The Bladebreakers arrive in Moscow on a brisk winter's day in anticipation of the World Beyblading final tournament. As they search for their hotel in the chilly city, they happen upon Boris, a strange man who claims to be the head of a rather eerie Beyblading training center. With the charm of an old world count, Boris invites them to lunch and them brings them to the training facility where they meet the next generation of Beybladers. It's here where Boris decides that one of his pupils should test his blading skills against Takao. The Bladebreakers are led into a rather stark, castle-like chamber which houses nothing more than a Beystadium. There, Takao takes on a young kid named Alexander. At first the battle is in favour of Alexander, but Takao quickly turns the tide with Kai's advice and wins with his patented Phantom Hurricane Attack. After the match, Alexander's Beyblade is crushed under Boris' foot and the young lad is dragged off in disgrace much to the confusion of the Bladebreakers who quickly leave. At the end of the episode, Kai vows to return.
41	"Out of the Past"; Transliteration: "Ima wa Shiki Kioku no Tobira" (Japanese: いまわしき記憶の扉)	October 15, 2001	April 19, 2003
The Bladebreakers run into some old friends in Russia when the All Starz and the White Tiger Clan show up for an exhibition match. The Beybattle between the two teams ends in a tie and they become fast friends, except for Emily and Mariah, who quickly develop a bitter rivalry. Meanwhile, Kai returns to the Abbey to find out why it fills him with foreboding. He discovers a cruel Beyblade facility in the sub-basements, housing twisted science experiments and an army of children being trained under extreme pressure to become deadly Beybladers. When Boris confronts Kai, his lost memories come flooding back as he realises that he was raised in the abbey.
42	"Drawn to the Darkness"; Transliteration: "Saikyō o Nozomu Mono" (Japanese: 最強を望む者)	October 22, 2001	April 20, 2003
Kai is torn between escaping the Abbey, now known as the Biovolt Corporation (with Biovolt being an acronym for Beybladers Intent On Victory Over Lawless Tyranny), or exploring it further in an attempt to unlock forgotten memories from his childhood. The Bladebreakers attempt to enter the abbey to track down their missing teammate, but are denied access by two of its bladers, Ian and Yuri Ivanov (Tala in the English dub and the versions based on it), under orders to stall them. After fighting his way through the tunnels, Kai discovers the existence of Black Dranzer, the world's most powerful Beyblade. Boris offers it to him – but only if Kai quits the Bladebreakers forever and rejoins the Biovolt Corporation. Flooding memories of using Black Dranzer as a child and the lure of its dark, corrupting power leads Kai to accept Black Dranzer and rejoin Biovolt. Yuri and Ian are then ordered to tell the Bladebreakers that Kai was caught sneaking around the facility and got a fever for staying too long out in the cold.
43	"Live and Let Kai!"; Transliteration: "Akumu no Seremonī Matchi" (Japanese: 悪夢のセレモニーマッチ)	October 29, 2001	April 26, 2003
It's the first day of the Beyblade World Championships in Moscow, and as the Bladebreakers leave their hotel, they still haven't been able to locate Kai who's been missing for some time now. Regardless, they arrive at the tournament and meet up with both the White Tigers and the All Starz who invite them to watch their first match against the Neo Borg (Demolition Boys in the English dub and the versions based on it), the reigning World Champions. At first things seem fairly normal, that is, until they start to battle. Ian and Yuri defeat Steve and Eddie respectively, with Yuri going as far as not having to make any move, he simply repels Trypio when it comes to touch his beyblade Wolborg. In the next match, Michael has to square off against a mystery member of the Neo Borg and it turns out to be none other than Kai, who has defected from the Bladebreakers. In the final battle, Kai challenges the whole team to battle him alone and wins with just one hit for every opponent. After his victory, he captures all his adversaries' Bit-Beasts and announces to the world that he now possesses the most powerful Beyblade ever.
44	"Losing Kai"; Transliteration: "Saraba Kai!" (Japanese: さらばカイ!)	November 5, 2001	April 27, 2003
Determined to avenge the All Starz's devastating defeat, the White Tigers are the next to face the Neo Borg in the Tournament. Kai is arrogant towards Yuri and the others, which makes them grow disgusted of him. Kai demands Boris to send him alone to the battle, and, one by one, he beats and captures every White Tigers Bit Beast, except for Kevin's Galmon, since he previously tried to talk his team mates out of facing Kai, and is as such the only one not to fight. The Bladebreakers storm the abbey in a desperate attempt to free Kai. Takao stumbles into Biovolt's secret lab and learns the truth about Kai's past from a gloating Boris. Takao refuses to give up on his friend until Kai hands over his old Dranzer and tells him to leave. In tears, Takao shows Kai's former beyblade to his team mates and tell them that Kai is over for them.
45	"Breaking the Ice"; Transliteration: "Baikaru-ko no Kettō" (Japanese: バイカル湖の決闘)	November 12, 2001	May 3, 2003
While the Bladebreakers prepare for the finals, they are approached by a man in a suit who tells them that Kai demands to meet them at a frozen Lake Baikal. All of them go except for Max, who is at the airport meeting his mother. At the lake, Kai despises his former team mates and challenges them for a battle. Takao, Rei and even Kyojyu face him altogether, but are all easily defeated. When Kai is just about to steal Takao's Dragoon, Max parachutes from his mother private plane and launches his newly improved Draciel, which is able to hold on even when Kai unleashes an all-out attack with his eight bit beasts. While Max keeps Kai busy, Takao takes the chance to launch Dranzer. Combining the powers of the four Bladebreakers Bit Beasts, Kai's former team mates are finally able to defeat Black Dranzer. While Kai regrets his own loss, the ice around him begins to break and he is just about to let himself fall into the cold water below. However, the Bladebreakers urge him to jump to safety, and he finally jumps back and asks for forgiveness. He then boards the helicopter that brought the Bladebreakers to the lake and goes back to the Abbey, where he intends to "make things right".
46	"First Strike"; Transliteration: "Bōgu Shūrai!" (Japanese: ボーグ襲来!)	November 19, 2001	May 4, 2003
Now that Kai is finally loyal to the Bladebreakers, he returns Black Dranzer to Boris, doing severe damage to the enemy headquarters in the process. Voltaire orders the operation to proceed and have the Neo Borg team capture the stolen bit beasts from Black Dranzer's blade. Meanwhile, Kai tells the Bladebreakers everything he knows about Biovolt Corporation and reveals that the company is creating a breed of powerful Bit-Beasts that are designed for war and the plan is to use them to take over the entire World. Soon after, Kaichou, Takao's father (Mr. Kinomiya) and grandfather (Ryu) enter the room and Mr. Kinomiya informs them that he had been hired by Kaichou to do some archaeological research on Bit Beasts. Eventually, he was approached by Boris, who informed him that he was carrying out some scientific research and figured out how to design Bit-Beasts out of the DNA of real creatures. Mr. Kinomiya was then contacted by the Russian police and learned that Boris was connected to Voltaire, the president of the international Biovolt Corporation and suspected of managing a top secret criminal organization within it. He then contacted Kaichou. Mr. Kinomiya then confirms that Voltaire is willing to take over the World and that BBA has been investigating him. Kai then reveals that Voltaire is his grandfather, which is why he was raised in the Abbey. Afterwards, the Neo Borg team attacked the BBA bus. Max battles Ian, but the two other members of the team, Sergei (Spencer in the English dub and the versions based on it) and another unnamed one join in and Sergei easily knocks him out, stealing Draciel in the process.
47	"A Lesson for Tyson"; Transliteration: "Saikai! Yūro Chīmu" (Japanese: 再会!ユーロチーム)	November 26, 2001	May 10, 2003
The Bladebreakers are stranded on the barren Russian Tundra after their run-in with the Neo Borg when Oliver and Enrique mysteriously show up in a bus. After picking them up, they are mysteriously forced to stop in front of an abandoned palace where Ralf challenges Takao to battle. At first it seems strange that Ralf would do this, but Takao accepts and a battle ensues with Takao losing two straight, making him infuriated. Ralf then tells Takao that he must harness his power back into his blade, which totally confuses Takao. Finally, Max tells Takao to remember the battle he had against Ralf back in his stadium. That's where Takao realised he must work together with his Bit Beast. With this knowledge, a third battle takes place and Takao defeats Ralf. In the end, Kaichou reveals he set this whole 'lesson' up to get the Bladebreakers ready for the final match with the Neo Borg. Without accessing their 'power from within', the Bladebreakers wouldn't stand a chance against the Neo Borg in the finals at the World Championships.
48	"Victory in Defeat"; Transliteration: "Kai no Sentaku" (Japanese: カイの選択)	December 3, 2001	May 11, 2003
The World Championship Finals are about to begin and Kai insists on Beybattling first, hoping his knowledge of the Neo Borg will give him an advantage over the Neo Borg' first fighter, Sergei. But in the first set of the best-of-three match, Seaborg, Sergei's whale Bit Beast, uses the water in the Black Sea Bowl to create a tsunami, which overwhelms Dranzer. Kai is desperate for victory and Voltaire makes him a tempting offer: the power of Black Dranzer in exchange for betraying his friends and stealing their Bit Beasts. Kai puts Black Dranzer's Bit chip in his beyblade, but he unleashes Dranzer instead and launches his special attack towards Sergei's Wolborg. However, his power is not enough and he loses the second round, with Dranzer being captured next. Despite Sergei's victory, Voltaire is angry and vows to destroy Kai and his teammates for betraying him and not using Black Dranzer.
49	"A Wicked Wind Blows"; Transliteration: "Byakko no Sakebi" (Japanese: 白虎の叫び)	December 10, 2001	May 17, 2003
After Kai's first round loss to the Neo Borg in the World Beyblade Finals, it's Rei's turn to take on the fourth member of the Neo Borg – now introduced as Bryan, described as a powerful and ruthless competitor who has learned to "block all emotions but hate". Rei learns the hard way that Bryan will do anything to win – including putting Rei himself through the wringer by having pieces of the stadium being thrown towards him via the rapidly spinning center of the dish. Bryan's attack includes the ability to manipulate air itself into a weapon, and he easily throws Rei out of the dish with a minor move. In the second round, Bryan uses the wind to hit Rei directly, but Rei keeps holding on and eventually beats Bryan. However, he faints just afterwards in front of a confident Bryan due to the energy used to hold on. In the third and decisive round, Rei is hit several times until he is pushed away from the dish. After seeing Driger holding on against Bryan's Fallborg and reminding of his friends' words of motivation, he musters up some strength, have Driger shield him and unleashes his final attack, shattering Fallborg to pieces and bringing the finals to a tie. He faints just afterwards, badly injured, but wakes up in time to realize he won just as he is taken to the hospital.
50	"New and Cyber-Improved..."; Transliteration: "Setsugen no Mokushiroku" (Japanese: 雪原の黙示録)	December 17, 2001	May 18, 2003
After a devastating match puts Rei in the hospital, Takao trains his heart out to prepare for his battle against Yuri, leader of the Neo Borg. Meanwhile, Yuri has become one of Boris' weird experiments, uploaded with dangerous Biovolt technology and being genetically modified and is called Cyber Tala/Yuri. Max's parents work together to come up with an improved Beyblade that can combat the existing threat of the Neo Borg' prowess. Using Judy's vast data on Dragoon, Max's father builds an upgraded version of Dragoon. Even though Yuri uses multiple Bit-Beasts plus his newly improved brain in the first round of the final match, he "chooses to lose" and Takao wins the first round. In the next round, Yuri unleashes a massive freezing attack that sends them both to a parallel dimension and warps the dish in a huge ice block.
51	"Final Showdown!"; Transliteration: "Beiburēdo yo Eien ni!" (Japanese: ベイブレードよ永遠に!)	December 24, 2001	May 24, 2003
With no contact with the outside world (though the broadcasting cameras are still able to somehow shoot images through the thick wall of ice), the second round begins, and it takes little time for Yuri to combine his multiple Bit Beasts into one and tie the score at 1-1 in the best of three finals. Meanwhile, Voltaire looks on and begins celebrating the victory, while Judy assembles Kevin and the Majestiks, the only world-class bladers who still have their Bit Beasts and are in good shape for a battle, in order to defeat Yuri in case Takao loses. With the second round loss, Takao has fallen into a funk and sees no way of winning, when Dragoon suddenly starts to talk to him. With a new outlook and positive thinking, Takao's confidence translates into a more powerful Dragoon, which handily defeats Yuri and ruins Voltaire's and Boris' plans. Despite his defeat, Yuri gladly shakes hands with Takao as he congratulates him on the battle. All the stolen Bit-Beasts are returned to their owners and in the end, Takao's friends gather around him, each willing to take on the new World Champion Beyblader.
