= Fats =

Fats or FATS may refer to:

- More than one type of fat, one of the three main macronutrients, along with carbohydrate and protein

== People with the nickname "Fats" ==
- Harmonica Fats (1927–2000), American blues harmonica player who was active in the 1950s through to the 1990s
- Hollywood Fats (1954–1986), American blues guitarist, active in Los Angeles, California
- Fats Dantonio (1918–1993), American Major League Baseball catcher
- Alex Delvecchio (born 1931), Canadian hockey player
- Fats Domino (1928–2017), American rock and roll singer and pianist
- Fats Everett (1915–1969), American politician
- Peter Fatialofa (1959–2013), Samoan rugby player
- Bob Fothergill (1897–1938), American Major League Baseball player
- Fats Heard (1923–1987), American jazz drummer
- Pete Henry (1897–1952), American football player
- Fats Jenkins (1898–1968), American Negro leagues baseball and barnstorming basketball player
- Frank Kalin (1917–1975), American Major League Baseball outfielder
- Fats Kaplin, American fiddler
- Anthony Lacen (1950–2004), American jazz tuba player and band leader nicknamed "Tuba Fats"
- J. D. Lawrence (1903–1971), American college football player
- Fats Navarro (1923–1950), American jazz trumpeter
- Fats Pichon (1906–1967), American jazz pianist and singer
- Alvin Roth (basketball) (1929–2003), American basketball player
- Fats Sadi (1927–2009), Belgian jazz musician
- Fats Waller (1904–1943), American jazz pianist
- Rudolf Wanderone (1913–1996), American billiards player

== Other uses ==
- Fish acute toxicity syndrome, responses in fish resulting from a short-term, acute exposure to a lethal concentration of a toxicant
- Foreign affiliate trade statistics, data detailing the economic operations of foreign direct investment-based enterprises
- Minnesota Fats, a fictional character in the novels The Hustler and The Color of Money and the film adaptation of the former

== See also ==
- Fat (disambiguation)
- Fatty (disambiguation)
