= El Gordo =

El Gordo is Spanish for "the fat one" or "the big one", and may refer to:

== Lottery prizes ==
- An alternative name for the Spanish Christmas Lottery as well as the name of its largest prize.
- El Gordo de la Primitiva, a Weekly Public lottery in Spain

== Places ==
- El Gordo (galaxy cluster), a very large distant galaxy cluster
- El Gordo, Cáceres, Spain, a municipality

== People ==
- Henry I of Navarre (1244–1274), King of Navarre, called in Spanish Enrique el Gordo
- Raúl De Molina (born 1959), nicknamed "El Gordo", co-host of the entertainment news show El Gordo y la Flaca
- El Gordo, the nickname of one of Pablo Escobar's men, discussed in Sebastián Marroquín's book Pablo Escobar: My Father (2014)
- "El Gordo," nickname of Nicolás Sierra Santana, the leader of the Mexican criminal organization Los Viagras

== See also ==
- Gordo (disambiguation)
