= Beyblade V-Force =

- Season 2
- The cover of the first DVD compilation of Beyblade V-Force.
- No. of episodes: 51

Release
- Original network: TV Tokyo
- Original release: January 7 – December 30, 2002

Season chronology
- ← Previous; Beyblade Next → G-Revolution

Beyblade V-Force is the second season of the 2001 Japanese anime television series Beyblade based on Takao Aoki's manga series of the same name, which itself is based on the Beyblade spinning top game from Takara Tomy. The 51-episode season was produced by Madhouse under the direction of Yoshio Takeuchi.

The season was first broadcast on TV Tokyo in Japan from January 7 to December 30, 2002. The season was licensed for English adaptation, broadcast, and release by Nelvana. The series was broadcast on the sibling cable channel YTV in Canada and ABC Family in the United States in 2002.

The season uses four pieces of theme music: Two opening themes and two ending themes. From episodes 1–21, the first opening theme is "OFF THE CHAIN" by TOSS & TURN while the ending theme is "URBAN LOVE" by Shiori. From episodes 22–51, the second opening theme is Jet (ジェット, Jetto) by FAIRY FORE while the ending theme is "What's The Answer?" by Retro G Style (R.G.S). For the English version, the opening and ending themes are "Let's Beyblade!" by Sick Kid ft. Lukas Rossi.

== Episode list ==
| No. overall | No. in season | Title | Original release date | English air date |
|---|---|---|---|---|
| 52 | 1 | "Shot Down in Flames!"; Transliteration: "Aratanaru teki" (Japanese: 新たなる敵) | 7 January 2002 | 30 August 2003 |
Bladebreakers, the current Beyblade world champions, have split up. Max is back to the United States and Rei to China; Kai's whereabouts are unknown; and Takao spends his days peacefully in Japan, dealing with every day issues at school and having some arguments with his classmate Hiromi Tachibana (Hilary in the English dub and the versions based on it). One day, a local supermarket promotes a minor beyblade championship whose winner will have the chance to challenge Takao. The champion, a mysterious boy who goes by the name of Mister X, shows an overwhelming difference in strength in the battle and it ends in his easy victory, leaving Takao speechless before a shocked audience.
| 53 | 2 | "The Search for Mr. X"; Transliteration: "Nazo no Burēdā Hantā tachi" (Japanese: 謎のブレーダーハンター達) | 14 January 2002 | 6 September 2003 |
Takao still can't get over losing his town's Beyblade Tournament to the mysterious Mister X. Kyojyu and Dizzi try to come up with some answers but the three discover a greater mystery. On the same day as Takao's loss, Max and Rei were also visited by similar shadowy figures that easily defeated them as well. While Takao does his best to avoid his school chores, Kyojyu makes a discovery about Mister X's Beyblade: it possesses an invisible bit-beast. Meanwhile, Takao unexpectedly runs into Mister X at a local park and immediately challenges him to a rematch.
| 54 | 3 | "Unseen and Unleashed"; Transliteration: "Mienai seijū" (Japanese: 見えない聖獣) | 21 January 2002 | 6 September 2003 |
Takao takes on the mysterious blader - introduced as Ozuma - again and loses for a second time when Dragoon mysteriously fails to appear on command. Effects from the battle sickened Hiromi and damaged Dizzi, whom Kyojyu endeavors to repair. Meanwhile, a group of shady Men in Black have been busy monitoring Takao and Ozuma the entire time, but their monitors exploded with Ozuma's power. At school, tensions between Takao and Hiromi continue to rise. Takao's turmoil over Dragoon's behavior sets him on an increased training regimen. Kyojyu fixes Dizzi, and encounters Hiromi en route to his meeting with Takao to work on the Dragoon problem. Before he can get there however, two Men in Black confront Kyojyu and Hiromi and demand to have Kyojyu's laptop.
| 55 | 4 | "Searching For Dragoon"; Transliteration: "Osorubeki IQ Burēdā" (Japanese: 恐るべきIQブレーダー) | 28 January 2002 | 13 September 2003 |
Takao heads to the park to meet Kyojyu, who has a plan to get Dragoon back "on line". But when Kyojyu and Hiromi are kidnapped, Takao is forced to jump through a series of hoops set out by their captors, which test his speed and determination. After successfully completing their orders, Takao arrives on a harbor and jumps aboard an unmanned boat, while being watched from the distance by Mister X. Takao then finds himself on a ship equipped with a fancy computer system – and his friends, locked in a glass-walled cage. A mysterious voice challenges Takao to a battle and he accepts, having the lives of Kyojyu and Hiromi at stake. Takao's opponent is a robot, it can read his every move before he makes it and Takao is easily defeated twice. After his second loss, the walls of his friend's cage begin to close in, but Takao begs for a third chance and is finally able to call upon Dragoon. However, under orders from an unnamed purple-haired man, the scientists that had been monitoring him try to have Dragoon captured. Takao manages to muster up some strength to set Dragoon free, destroy the robot, knock its beyblade out and save his friends. As they leave the ship, Ozuma is once again shown watching them from the distance.
| 56 | 5 | "Guess Who's Back in Town?!"; Transliteration: "Yomigaeru, Kai" (Japanese: よみがえる、カイ) | 4 February 2002 | 20 September 2003 |
Takao and Kyojyu are safe on dry land once again but are totally baffled trying to figure out why Kyojyu and Hiromi were targeted by the two mystery men. The best that they can deduce is that two factions are out to steal the bit-beasts of all the members of the Bladebreakers. This leads them to wonder about Kai, who supposedly has retired. The episode cuts to Kai's prep school, where a curious student named Minami (Wyatt in the English dub and versions based upon it) is all over Kai trying to get him to come out of retirement and show him a few pointers on how to blade. Kai ignores him until an unnamed beyblader starts attacking Kai to force him out of his retirement. Kai tries to hide Dranzer, but Minami steals it to battle the unnamed beyblader. In no time, the attacker wins, but Kai decides to fight the rematch. The fight is fierce and ends in a draw. After the battle, Kai decides to come out of his self-imposed retirement because he believes he has at last found a worthy opponent.
| 57 | 6 | "The Magtram Threat!"; Transliteration: "Kyōi no magutoramu" (Japanese: 脅威のマグトラム) | 11 February 2002 | 27 September 2003 |
The two men in black that have been monitoring Takao are seen within the facilities of the company they work for. The purple-haired man that appeared during Takao`s match against a robot is introduced as Gideon, and he is accompanied by the head of the scientists. Inside Gideon's training center, the two men in black discover a talented blader named Snakey and offer to equip his blade with the Magtram, a device that creates a magnetic field around the user's Beyblade and gives an unfair advantage to anyone using it. Kyojyu and Hiromi are on the look out for their mysterious captors when Takao shows up with a new scheme to find Ozuma. Out of nowhere, Snakey shows up and challenges Takao to a match. Little does Takao know that Snakey is being used as bait so that Gideon can collect data on Dragoon. Takao accepts the challenge but it looks like he might lose until Kai appears and offers some much-needed support. Takao releases Dragoon and after an intense battle he knocks Snakey's Blade out of the stadium and wins the match. Gideon's henchmen, hiding in the bushes, record the whole event and send it back to Gideon's lair. Meanwhile, Ozuma and his unnamed friend who challenged Kai watch all the action from afar and discuss their next move.
| 58 | 7 | "The Reunion Begins"; Transliteration: "Shikumareta chōsen" (Japanese: 仕組まれた挑戦) | 18 February 2002 | 23 September 2003 |
Takao and Kyojyu try to determine what was the mystery material inside Snakey's Beyblade that made it so magnetic. Gideon orders the two men in black to find a way to assemble the Bladebreakers. It is part of his yet-unknown plan involving their bit-beasts. Kai is tight-lipped after rejoining his friends following his draw against Dunga. Kai crashes at Takao's place, but departs quickly after old grievances resurface, and Hiromi suspects him of being a spy. Takao and Kyojyu e-mail Max's Mom, asking for help with their analysis of the mystery metal, while Hiromi suggests visiting another person who could help them - Kaichou. At the same day, the head of the BBA is visited by the scientist-in-chief of Gideon's organization. He introduces himself as Doctor B and his team as the Team Psychic. He wants to challenge the Bladebreakers for the Championship title, but to become eligible they must first defeat the BBA Trainee Team, which they easily do in front of a shocked audience consisting of Takao, Kaichou, Kyojyu and the remaining trainees. Kai rejoins Takao, and Daitokuji Kaichou puts out a call to Max and Rei. The Blade Breakers reunion is imminent. Kyojyu investigates on Snakey's blade and finally learns about the Magtram system, which Takao suggests he applies to the Bladebreakers' blades.
| 59 | 8 | "Return of The Bladebreakers!"; Transliteration: "Fukkatsu! BBA chīmu" (Japanese: 復活!BBAチーム) | 25 February 2002 | 24 September 2003 |
With the arrival of Max and Rei, the Bladebreakers are back together again. With one week to train, Max and Kyojyu reveal the new technology developed by Max's mom, the MG Core. It produces a magnetic field similar to the one in the Magtram technology, giving the beyblader optimal control over their Beyblade and increasing the Beyblade's power ten fold. However, it's not an easy thing to control, and the guys have a rough start. Hiromi and Kyojyu come up with a "back to the basics" practice schedule, but Takao is initially reluctant to follow a beginner's training program and ends up insulting Hiromi. The Bladebreakers start following their own training program but are still unable to control their beyblades with only three days left. Kai decides to give Hiromi's schedule a try and manages to regain full control of Dranzer. His other team mates are also successful and Takao apologizes to Hiromi, The Bladebreakers and Hiromi are ready to take on Team Psykick and board the bus to the battle. However, the bus driver tranquilizes them with some sleeping gas as they are taken to an unknown location.
| 60 | 9 | "La Isla Bey-Nita!!"; Transliteration: "Mitsurin no batoru sutajiamu" (Japanese: 密林のバトルスタジアム) | 4 March 2002 | 30 September 2003 |
The Bladebreakers awake on an island (though initially unaware that it is an island) with electronic bracelets stuck on their arms. Through a speaker, Doctor B informs them that they are trapped and that the tournament is going to happen in that area, and that the only way they can escape is by battling Team Psykick members one by one. Meanwhile, Kaichou discovers that there was never a tournament booked for the stadium he went to, and the bus company never charted a bus for the Bladebreakers. Ozuma and Dunga (the mysterious beyblader who challenged Kai) overhear the conversation from behind a corner and discuss their next moves. Back at the island, the Bladebreakers try to find a way out, but are eventually forced to fight Chameleon, who specifically picks Max for a fight. His beyblade is able to change its colour just like a chameleon, but Max manages to defeat it by calling upon Draciel. Doctor B tries to have it captured, but Draciel easily tears the bit-beast capturing system apart. Shortly after, the group realizes they are trapped in an island and Takao hurts his leg.
| 61 | 10 | "The Island of No Return"; Transliteration: "Kurayami no Gekitotsu" (Japanese: 暗闇の激突) | 11 March 2002 | 7 October 2003 |
The Bladebreakers decide to split up in order to find a way off of the island. Hiromi, Kai and Kyojyu head for the lighthouse where they hope to find a way to communicate with the outside world and call for help, while Takao, Rei and Max decide to carry on with the beybattles, hoping that if they win, they will be able to leave the site. Meanwhile, Kaichou and Takao's grandfather discuss their disappearance and try to figure out how to find them, while being watched from afar by Ozuma and Dunga. Kai's gang face difficult obstacles when their mysterious captor tries to dissuade them from reaching the lighthouse, and they barely escape in one piece. On the other side of the island, Takao, Rei and Max are led into a cave and right into a trap. They are challenged by Bat, a blader with the ability to see in the dark. Because Takao's ankle is sprained, Rei steps up to the plate. He almost loses Driger to his opponent, but Takao's quick thinking helps him win. By focusing on what he can hear instead of what he can't see, Rei manages to target Bat's Batranzer Beyblade and defeat him, as well as setting Driger free from Psykick's bit-beast capturing system. Meanwhile, as Hiromi and gang have found a way to the lighthouse, a new blader challenges Kai to a battle.
| 62 | 11 | "The Evil Island of Dr. B"; Transliteration: "Kotō no Daisakusen" (Japanese: 孤島の大決戦) | 18 March 2002 | 14 October 2003 |
Kai and Figel fight on top of a bridge while Kyojyu tries to hack into Psykick's system in order to shut down the bit-beast capturing mechanisms. He makes it, but Kai manages to defeat his opponent without having to bring Dranzer out, anyway. Kyojyu, Kai and Hiromi then resume their quest to the lighthouse to get a clear satellite signal to get help from the outside. Finally they make contact, but not before they return to find Takao in battle against another member of Team Psykick, Daryl, the one who defeated a BBA training beyblader and earned the right for Psykick to challenge the Bladebreakers. Because Takao's ankle is still hurt, he starts the battle in disadvantage, a condition that is worsened by the fact that the stadium is wet due to a waterfall next to it, but Deryl's blade is unaffected since it has a spraying mechanism at the bottom tip of it. Hiromi and the others try to talk Takao out of the fight before he gets a permanent bruise, but Takao is determined to take the victory and get away from the island. In the end, Takao pulls off a win, sets Dragoon free from the bit-beast capturing mechanism and the island's laboratory is destroyed. Doctor B and his team flee by boat. Soon after, Daitokuji Kaichou and Takao's grandfather arrive in a helicopter to rescue the kids, and Ozuma and Dunga are seen on the island, relieved that the Bladebreakers are safe and that they "won't have anyone else interfere with their plans".
| 63 | 12 | "Bring Me Dranzer!"; Transliteration: "Hoero! Doranzā" (Japanese: 吠えろ! ドランザー) | 25 March 2002 | 14 October 2003 |
Takao recuperates in the hospital after being rescued from the island where he fought Team Psykick. Away from school, Takao discovers he really likes hospital life until Hiromi and their teacher Mrs. Kinkaid show up with all his homework assignments. Kaichou goes to the hospital to meet the Bladebreakers and they ask him to help them finding Ozuma, Dunga and the other two beybladers who defeated Rei and Max, while being watched from afar by Ozuma himself, which Kai almost notices. Meanwhile Gideon, disappointed with Doctor B's failed attempts to capture the Bladebreakers bit-beasts, demands that he and his team create their own bit-beasts - Cyber bit-beasts - using the data they have gathered on the Blade Breakers. Across town, Ozuma and Dunga meet their team mates Mariam and Yusufu (Max's and Rei's opponents, respectively. Yusufu was named Joseph in the English dub and the versions based on it; they are respectively the English and Japanese variations of Yossef) and plot their own strategy to get the Bladebreakers bit-beasts before Psykick. Eventually, Mariam picks on Dunga for being the only one who failed to defeat his opponent and Dunga goes for Kai in a rage to settle his account with the Bladebreaker. This creates a good opportunity for Psykick to get some missing data from Dranzer, since they failed to study it at the island due to Kyojyu hacking into their system and Kai defeating Figel without even calling upon his bit-beast. Dunga heads for Takao's house and lures Kai to a beystadium under a bridge while Gideon's henchmen record the whole event. Eventually, the group realizes they are being watched, but Ozuma destroys the camera with his beyblade, forcing the two men in black to flee, unaware that Yusufu has hidden under their van. The camera's explosion damages the bridge and the debris disturb the match, which ends in another draw. Dunga leaves and, despite the destruction of the camera, Doctor B's team still manage to acquires the necessary data to create the Cyber bit-beasts.
| 64 | 13 | "Testing One, Two, Three"; Transliteration: "Okite ya Buri no Beibatoru" (Japanese: 掟やぶりのベイバトル) | 1 April 2002 | 28 October 2003 |
Yusufu infiltrates the Psykicks' laboratory and discovers that they are using the data they collected on the Blade Breakers to create Cyber Bit-Beasts based on the original ones. But the Doctor's first test ends in a failure and he goes insane while an unimpressed Gideon leaves. Yusufu takes the information to the rest of his team - now introduced as the Saint Shileds - and it is revealed that he and Mariam are siblings. Yusufu thinks of a way to prepare the Bladebreakers to face the cyber bit-beasts. As for the Bladebreakers, they learn that the Saint Shields are all in the vicinity. With the Psykicks still after them as well, the Bladebreakers hold a full-on practice to prepare themselves for all potential threats. During their session, Max is lured away by Mariam, who initiates a battle with him in the woods that's secretly being observed by the other Saint Shields. Yusufu soon joins in, outnumbering Max. Rei finds them and interrupts the battle. Together, the four combatants start a two-on-two beybattle which ends with Max and Rei losing decisively as a result of Mariam and Yusufu's heightened team play. Ozuma and Dunga come out of their hiding and the group prepares to leave, but Takao arrives and challenges Ozuma for a third battle.
| 65 | 14 | "Gideon Raises Gerry"; Transliteration: "Tsukurareta seijū" (Japanese: 作られた聖獣) | 8 April 2002 | 4 November 2003 |
Ozuma accepts Takao's challenge and they fight at the Saint Shield's warehouse. As it rages on, Takao is forced to call out his Victory Tornado Attack in order to win. After the fight, Ozuma flippantly tells Takao he needs to "improve his bit-beast technique". Meanwhile, Gideon oversees Doctor B who unveils the first stable Cyber bit-beast. This cloned power from the sacred bit-beasts has been compressed into one blade. Doctor B then introduces Gerry, one of the best Bladers Team Psykick has to offer and the one that was picked to control the Cyber bit-beast. The scientist also introduce the Cyber Launcher, a launcher with all data collected from beybladers from all the World. Gideon wants to have the beyblade tested before it engages in a battle against the Bladebreakers, so they enroll Gerry in a local tournament. Gerry reaches the semi-finals and draws out the Cyber Beast in battle to see how it handles. The Bladebreakers show up at the same tournament after an invitation of Kaichou just as Gerry calls out his bit-beast. The Beast goes totally out of control and self destructs, knocking Gerry out. Psykick's men in black break into the stadium, collect Gerry and the blade and flee. Takao and the Bladebreakers watch and Ozuma is seen behind a wall, checking on the situation.
| 66 | 15 | "Show Me The Bit Beasts!"; Transliteration: "Seijū o mite mitai!" (Japanese: 聖獣を見てみたい!) | 15 April 2002 | 4 November 2003 |
The Blade Breakers discuss the bit-beast they've seen at the tournament. Kyojyu consults his laptop and realizes the bit-beast is a digital copy of Dragoon made of data from the Bladebreakers bit-beasts. This motivates the team to get themselves in shape for battle, and Hiromi takes the chance to ask them to show her the bit-beasts - which she had always been unable to see. The Saint Shields are still eager to test the power of the Blade Breakers' bit-beasts as well, so they head to the beach where Takao and the others are training and ultimately make their presence known. Rei challenges Yusufu for a rematch. Just when it looks like Rei's bit-beast Driger is going down, he manages to pull off some impressive moves and win the match. Everyone is ecstatic, especially Hiromi because she's finally able to see the bit-beasts. At Psykick's labs, Doctor B is busy experimenting with the Cyber bit-beasts. His first shown attempt is another failure, but he eventually succeeds and manages to get two Cyber bit-beasts to keep stable and battle each other.
| 67 | 16 | "Team Psykick's New Recruit"; Transliteration: "Saibā burēdā no Higeki" (Japanese: サイバーブレーダーの悲劇) | 22 April 2002 | 21 September 2003 |
As the Bladebreakers continue their training program, Kai's classmate Minami returns and begs Kai to help him train to become a first-class Beyblader. Remembering the time back at school that Minami betrayed Kai by stealing Dranzer and using it in battle against Dunga, Kai turns him down. Hurt, Minami vows to return and defeat Kai one day. Because Gideon has finally approved Doctor B's Cyber bit-beast program, Psykick is searching for beybladers willing to give the new system a try. Doctor B approaches Minami with an offer to join Team Psykick, and Minami jumps at the chance. When his training is complete, Minami is sent to battle Kai, with the hopes of capturing his bit-beast. Despite warnings from Ozuma, Takao and the gang are ready for a fight, but Dunga jumps in and challenges Minami to fight him instead. The new bit-beast wins over Dunga's Vortex Ape, but Minami goes insane and eventually dies in Kai's arms (this scene is omitted from the English dub and the versions based on it, and it is instead implied that he went insane). The Saint Shields leave and tell the Bladebreakers to be more serious about their next warnings. Gideon and Doctor B are pleased with the bit-beast's performance and are eager to find another skilled blader. Kai vows to make them pay for Minami 's death.
| 68 | 17 | "Hilary's Bey-B-Cue"; Transliteration: "Shukumei no pureryudo" (Japanese: 宿命のプレリュード) | 29 April 2002 | 27 September 2003 |
Takao is back home practicing his blading and quickly tires of it. The rest of the Bladebreakers, including Hiromi, keep harping on him to continue until he gets it right. But Takao gets angry and decides to quit the training program. Everyone gets in an argument until they simply decide to call the Bladebreakers' quits. In order to keep the team together, Hiromi suggests they should take a day off and invites them to an afternoon barbecue with Grandpa playing the part of the Chef. At first Takao wants nothing to do with it, but finally he relents and joins in. Meanwhile, a foursome of beybladers arrive at the airport and save a beyblade from being run over. Back at the barbecue, the kids relax by the river after eating while Grandpa fishes. Suddenly he hooks a big one and gets dragged in the water. The kids run to the rescue, however, the group of four new characters were passing by and rescue Gramps. They introduce themselves as bladers that are just back from a one-year trip around the world made in order to acquire experience and knowledge. Takao challenges their leader, to a battle. After a fierce fight, it ends in a tie and the new kids leave, with their leader introducing himself as Kane. Soon after, the new team arrives at Psykick's headquarters, where they are greeted by Gideon and Doctor B, who show them the new Cyber bit-beast-powered beybldes. Kane, as well as his friends (introduced as Goki, Jim and Salima) were brought back home in order to form the new Team Psykick. Kai was absent for most of the episode, being shown only at the beginning, when he recalls Minami's last battle and promises to avenge his death.
| 69 | 18 | "When Friends Become Foes"; Transliteration: "Saikai no Kein" (Japanese: 再会のケイン) | 6 May 2002 | 28 September 2003 |
Kane, Goki, Jim, and Salima arrive at Doctor B's lab to begin battle tests for Gideon. Jim goes first after being given his new Beyblade, Cyber Draciel. He battles against a lopsided number of automated Beybades, including one behemoth the size of a football. But with Cyber Draciel in tow, victory is decisive. However, the Cyber Bit-Beast's power is having a corrupting influence on Jim. At Kaichou's office, the Bladebreakers are blackmailed into a future battle against the Psykick's when Doctor B threatens an all-out assault on the city by the Cyber Bit-Beasts. When Takao hears that his new friend Kane has joined the Psykick's, he refuses to believe it without concrete proof. Together with Kyojyu, Hiromi, Rei and Max, and with some information from Ozuma, Takao sneaks into Doctor B's lab, though Max is left outside just as they approach the building. There, they come upon a fight between an arrogant Jim and Goki, whose blade is easily destroyed by Cyber Draciel, which is more powerful than Draciel itself and is even able to evolve to higher levels of strength. It's confirmed that Kane and his friends have indeed been recruited by the Psykick. Takao tries to talk Kane out of using a cyber bit beast, but that reveals the Bladebreakers' position and they are searched by the guards. Kai, alerted by Max, makes a timely arrival and saves their skins. Having noticed the negative effect of the Cyber Bit-Beasts on their users, Kane, Goki and Salima are wary about using them. Kane refuses Doctor B's offer to have his own Cyber Bit-Beast, insisting that his upcoming battle with Takao be on even terms.
| 70 | 19 | "Their Own Private Battles"; Transliteration: "Sorezore no tatakai" (Japanese: それぞれの戦い) | 13 May 2002 | 4 October 2003 |
After seeing the power of the Cyber bit-beasts in Team Psykick's BeyBlades, Takao vows to do whatever it takes to beat them. Even if that means breaking the rules and modifying his own Beyblade illegally, which his friends are initially against, specially Rei, who protests and demands that the Bladebreakers play fair even if the odds are against them. At the Psykicks' lab, Goki is the second to give in to the power of the Cyber bit-beasts. He is given the Cyber Dranzer and tests it against Jim. Rei and Salima go out for a walk and eventually meet each other by a river, where they find out both feel the same way. Salima tries to convince Rei to get the Bladebreakers to forfeit their upcoming match and even offers to reveal the secrets of the Cyber bit-beasts in return. They agree to meet the next day. Rei tries to convince his friends to forfeit the match. Rei gets to the meeting point, but Salima is not there, since she was caught by Kane trying to take a cyber bit-beast. Instead, Kai shows up and talks to Rei about the upcoming match and how they should do whatever it takes in order to win and avenge Minami's death. Back at the Psykicks', Kane convinces Salima to accept her Cyber bit-beast and confront the Bladebreakers, so that they can prove they will not be controlled by the creatures. Rei waits until the early morning, but since Salima didn't show up, Rei changes his mind and decides to accept the challenge. Meanwhile, the Saint Shields discuss the situation and Ozuma decides to intervene in Takao's attitude.
| 71 | 20 | "The Power Half Hour!"; Transliteration: "Ashita e no ketsui" (Japanese: 明日(アス)への決意) | 20 May 2002 | 5 October 2003 |
Kyojyu unveils Takao's new Dragoon, equipped with illegal modifications, as Takao requested in the previous episode. But because his blade now has too much offensive power, Takao is unable to control it and he blames Kyojyu. His friends try to tell him cheating isn't the way to win, yet Takao ignores them and goes off to sulk about his dilemma. Meanwhile, the Psykick's are with Doctor B who informs them that he just wants to do some last minute finishing touches on their cyber bit-beasts. Both Kane and Salima protest saying, they feel they are more important as players than any cyber bit-beast. But once they go into battle and feel the raw cyber power, they are immediately hooked and want more. When Gideon is finally convinced that the four bladers are ready to face the challenge, he leaves the room and talks to a shadowy male figure through video conference, bowing before him and informing that the program is going as planned. Meanwhile, Takao is still trying to get a hold of his new illegal Dragoon just as Ozuma walks up. He challenges Takao for a fight and intends to "teach him a lesson". Takao is still unable to fully control his beyblade and Dragoon even ignores him when he tries to bring it out. Ozuma then makes his final move, severely damaging Dragoon. Takao finally understands that cheating is wrong and apologizes to his friends.
| 72 | 21 | "Battle Tower Showdown"; Transliteration: "Batoru tawā no inbō" (Japanese: バトルタワーの陰謀) | 27 May 2002 | 11 October 2003 |
The Bladebreakers travel by helicopter together with Kyojyu, Hiromi and Kaichou to their re-match against the Psykick's while the Saint Shields watch from afar and decide to follow them. During the flight, Hiromi remembers how Psykick trapped her and Kyojyu on a cargo ship; Max ponders their recent training; Kai regrets the Psykick' mistreatment of Minami; Rei recalls the time Salima reached out to him; and Takao remains bitter about Kane joining Psykick. Gideon is seen talking to the shadowy figure, now introduced as Dr. Zagart. When they arrive at the battle location - a five-story, monolithic building called 'The Battle Tower' - Gideon finally introduces himself to them via video screen, and outlines the format. On each floor, one Psykick awaits a different Bladebreaker, and each match will be a one-match-only sudden death battle, which Kaichou objects but ultimately accepts when the Bladebreakers say they will not be intimidated by Gideon. When the video screen is turned off, a squad of 'Blade Bruiser' Meka-Shooters launches a hailstorm of beyblades. The Bladebreakers revel in thwarting the threat - until they realize its only a plot to weaken their blades before the real battles. More Blade Bruisers join the fray, but a surprise appearance by the Saint Shields helps them escape the ground floor and ascend the tower. Kaichou stays behind, too scared to go through the beyblade war. On the second floor, they're confronted by Jim, who faces off against Max while the rest of the Bladebreakers are imprisoned within a glass cage. Cyber Draciel overpowers its Bit-Beast progenitor, but Max's determination spurs a comeback and the cyber-copy is defeated. However, Psykick has set a cyber bit-beast repairing machine that restores the fallen Cyber Draciel.
| 73 | 22 | "Max Takes One For The Team"; Transliteration: "Dorashieru no Kiki" (Japanese: ドラシエルの危機) | 10 June 2002 | 18 October 2003 |
Cyber Draciel is repaired and this upsets Max and the whole team, but he defeats it once again, collecting his beyblade back and celebrating with his friends. However, Cyber Draciel is repaired again and Jim wants another match. Even though everyone warns him against it, Max goes back for another round. His team mates then decide to destroy the cyber bit-beast repairing system, but the glass cage trapping them is too resistant. Meanwhile, the Saint Shileds are off to the second floor after overcoming the robots. Doctor B tries to stop them, but only manages to separate them from Kaichou. Back at the battle zone, Max keeps ignoring his friends' advice and attacks Jim with everything he's got. In the end, he loses and Draciel is captured and placed in a holding tank in front of the shocked team of the Saint Shields, who had just arrived. Furious that Max lost his bit-beast, Dunga punches him in the face (this is omitted the English dub and versions based on it) and is subsequently held by Takao and Rei and then reprehended by Hiromi. Takao and the others come to Max's side and vow to win Draciel back for him no matter what. The Saint Shields start searching for Draciel but are tricked into falling down a deep pitch. They manage to grab some pipes and survive. The Bladebreakers reach for the third floor, a cave-like stadium, where Rei is shocked to find Salima waiting for him.
| 74 | 23 | "The Bigger The Cyber-Driger... The Harder It Falls"; Transliteration: "Yakusoku no Batorufīrudo" (Japanese: 約束のバトルフィールド) | 17 June 2002 | 25 October 2003 |
A confused and heartbroken Rei faces Salima and despite the threat of losing his bit-beast forever, he hesitates, baffled by the extreme change in Salima's personality. Frustrated with Rei's attitude, Salima attacks him with more and more power. When Kai shows him the beastless Max's beyblade and tells him that he is letting those responsible for Draciel's capture win, he fights back and the match ends in a draw. Salima immediately demands a rematch. Rei is still reluctant and thinks Salima is not really willing to fight him but eventually accepts to battle. Doctor B decides to intervene and activates some ventilators that generate strong winds within the battlefield, affecting the battle and putting Rei in disadvantage. Salima protests and has her Cyber bit-beast destroy the fans' generator. Doctor B still tries to put her in advantage and start enlarging Cyber Driger. This makes Salima more powerful than Rei, but she appears unable to control such power. Eventually, she tells Rei why she didn't meet him as they agreed, but keeps trying to resist Cyber Driger's power. Rei keeps battling and finally wins. As Salima leaves the field, Rei and the others try to convince her not to come back to the Psykicks, but she leaves anyway, frustrated. The Saint Shields are shown trying to reach for Draciel and facing some obstacles in their way.
| 75 | 24 | "Ghost in The Machine"; Transliteration: "Kiri no Naka no Maboroshi" (Japanese: 霧の中の幻) | 24 June 2002 | 26 October 2003 |
The Bladebreakers reach the fourth level of Gideon's Battle Tower and meet their next opponent, Goki, whom Kai is willing to face. Meanwhile, tension grows between Gideon and Doctor B. The scientist guarantees to his boss that he still has some surprises, such as using the information gathered from the previous two beybattles, Doctor B has programmed Driger and Draciel's attack patterns into Goki's beyblade. Meanwhile, the Saint Shields continue to explore the Psykick's headquarters in an attempt to find Max's captured Draciel. But Dunga's impatience sets off the alarms, alerting Gideon to their presence at last. Doctor B has the system enlarge Cyber Dranzer the same way he did with Cyber Driger, but Kai still manages to pull out a draw even though he is still confused about who he is facing: Goki or Minami, whose death still haunts him. Kai reveals that he thinks he's facing Minami in the match, and can't bring himself to fight. Takao warns Kai that Doctor B is taking advantage of his guilt to launch a psychic assault during the match. Kai is almost eliminated when Goki overplays his role as the "ghostly" Minami and gives Kai the key to breaking his psychic hold. Kai and Dranzer destroy Goki's Cyber Dranzer in a spectacular counter-move. Thanks to his friends, Kai has finally laid his guilt to rest.
| 76 | 25 | "Raising Kane!!"; Transliteration: "Dengeki seijū NO. 4" (Japanese: 電撃聖獣NO.4) | 1 July 2002 | 1 November 2003 |
Following his defeat, Goki is thrown into a glass cage together with Salima, as a punishment for losing. Gideon is even more disappointed with Doctor B, but the scientist guarantees Kane will not fail. The Bladebreakers arrive at the top and last floor, where Takao is expected to face Kane. As with the previous battles, Doctor B sets a system to put Kane in unfair advantage: a recharging mechanism just above the stadium which Kane is easily able to reach by activating a jumping mechanism in the bottom tip of his beyblade. The fight is fierce from the get-go but as it progresses, Takao manages to get under Kane's skin by telling him the only way to win is by using one's skill, not relying on a manufactured bit-beast. Takao's words hit a chord with Kane and he decides not to call out the Cyber Dragoon to fight for him. Instead, he wants to win it on his own. Gideon and Doctor B are incensed, but because Kane wants to win so badly, he summons up enough energy for Doctor B to force Cyber Dragoon out of the beyblade. Kane orders the scientist to stop, but his will to win eventually brings it out. The beast grows beyond control and puts Takao in clear disadvantage. Meanwhile, Ozuma and his gang are lost within the massive building and frantically split up to race and find Draciel.
| 77 | 26 | "Cyber Dragoon Takes Control"; Transliteration: "Senritsu no saibā" (Japanese: 戦慄のサイバー) | 8 July 2002 | 2 November 2003 |
Kane's Cyber bit-beast keeps growing in size and strength, and it even has the ability to copy Dragoon's moves and improve on them. Cyber Dragoon grows so powerful that it starts releasing energy shock waves which damages the stadium and the building's system. It also starts controlling Kane's mind, driving him insane and changing his personality. The energy waves get stronger and reach the control room where Gideon, Doctor B, the rest of Team Psykick and a couple of scientists are overseeing the matches. Gideon demand Doctor B to do something and Salima takes the chance to escape, since her cage was destroyed. With the odds against him, Takao reluctantly tells Dragoon to get back to its beyblade, but the bit-beast summons the strength to continue the fight. This inspires Takao and he vows to defeat the demented Kane at any cost. Salima reaches the battle room and tries to talk Kane out of succumbing to Cyber Dragoon, but he simply ignores her and fights back. She tries to convince him a second time but now Kane answers by having Cyber Dragoon knock Salima several meters away. This enrages Takao, who wows to defeat him. The Saint Shields are shown in a couple of unsuccessful attempts to reach for Draciel and the Bladebreakers.
| 78 | 27 | "Building the Perfect Beast!"; Transliteration: "Bōsō Tawā no Saigo" (Japanese: 暴走タワーの最期) | 15 July 2002 | 8 November 2003 |
Ozuma reaches the fifth floor and finds Takao and Kane carrying on with their furious battle, with Cyber Dragoon growing stronger and damaging the building. Kane succumbs as his energy is being drained by his bit-beast and he is losing control over it. As Cyber Dragoon grows, it looks more and more like Takao is about to lose, when Kai tells him the only way to get rid of the Cyber bit-beast is for Takao to destroy it. Takao musters up all his power and in one fell swoop, Dragoon destroys its doppelganger and Zagart is shown moving away from the video screen he was using to watch the battles. However, Cyber Dragoon's power has compromised the building's structure and it begins to collapse. An insane Doctor B tries to have the whole building destroyed at once, but Gideon stops him, tackling him towards a damaged computer in the process. Doctor B is subsequently electrocuted to death and soon after Gideon is also killed by fallen debris, (both instances are drastically shortened in the English dub and versions based upon it). The Bladebreakers, Kane and Salima are soon joined by Goki, Jim and Kaichou, but Max realizes his Draciel is still being held captive in the lab. Max races back inside followed closely by Takao. Once inside the lab, they meet up with Ozuma and his gang who had just set Draciel free and Max orders it to return to his beyblade. Everyone manages to leave the building in safety. Just when they try to thank Ozuma for all the support, the Saint Shields reveal they have never been on the same side and Ozuma says that "the day is coming when the Bladebreakers' bit-beasts will be theirs". Before they can understand what's going on, Kane and his friends thank them for the help and leave.
| 79 | 28 | "Hot Rock"; Transliteration: "Nyū Yōku Nazo no Sekiban" (Japanese: ニューヨーク 謎の石版) | 22 July 2002 | 9 November 2003 |
The Bladebreakers are en route to New York City, where Max's mother Judy is expected to fix their beyblades from the damage they suffered at the Psykick's building. Just as they leave the airport, however, Judy takes them to the BBA research lab where she shows them an ancient rock, covered in mysterious writing. Judy reveals that not only is the rock believed to hold the secret of the bit-beasts, but an organized crime syndicate is plotting to steal it. A test battle is fought, using a bit containing a piece of the rock but the power it produces is far too unstable. The blader who performed the test turns out to be Max's school friend, Alan, and the two pals make plans to enter a Beyblade tournament scheduled for the next day. But that night, the rock is stolen by Alan himself and two men. The Bladebreakers are informed of it just as Judy unveils the newly repaired Driger and Dranzer. Arriving at the BBA facility, Takao grabs a bike and sets off in hot pursuit, using a practice blade to blow out the getaway car's tire. The thieves take off on foot and Max runs into them only to discover that his pal, Alan, is in on the plot.
| 80 | 29 | "Bad Seed in The Big Apple"; Transliteration: "Makkusu Tomo no Sakebi" (Japanese: マックス 友の叫び) | 29 July 2002 | 15 November 2003 |
The Bladebreakers discuss the stealing of the rock and Alan's involvement. Meanwhile, he is seen in a warehouse receiving a new beyblade with a piece of the rock from a mysterious blond woman. She leaves the warehouse only to be chased by the police, which she easily evades. The tournament mentioned by Alan in the previous episode is about to take place and Max's first opponent turns out to be Alan. Alan tells Max that if Max wins, he'll explain why he agreed to be part of the plot to steal the rock. The battle is heated and Max is determined to win. After one draw and several close calls, Max finally wins with his new Draciel Viper built by his father. In the end Alan explains that he was approached by the blond woman (who is shown at the airport taking a wig off, revealing her true black hair, and taking off with the rock) who convinced him if he stole the rock she would give him a new, more powerful Beyblade. He then walks away with a police inspector.
| 81 | 30 | "Get a Piece of The Rock"; Transliteration: "Yomigaeru Sekiban no Chikara" (Japanese: よみがえる石版の力) | 5 August 2002 | 16 November 2003 |
When the kids return to Japan accompanied by Judy, they are taken to an abandoned research facility where Daitokuji Kaichou had once worked on a similar rock with his old partner, Dr. Zagart. Like the one that was stolen from the BBA, this rock was covered in mysterious writing and possessed strange powers. It too disappeared, along with Dr. Zagart who was never seen again. Dickinson recalls Zagart being obsessed with the rock. The last time he saw Zagart was the day before he went missing. At a science lab, the mysterious woman who took the rock from New York City is revealed to be a scientist working for Zagart. She is just about to complete her analysis on the rock, which reveals several different creatures sealed in it. The researchers make it to extract one foxy-like beast from the rock and place it into a beyblade. After a quick battle with Kyojyu and his new "Einstein" Beyblade, Takao realizes he still has to learn how to control his new Beyblade, Dragoon V2. While practicing down by the river, he is challenged to a battle by Ozuma and the Saint Shields. When asked why they want to steal the four bit-beasts, Ozuma simply answers that this is their "mission". Takao accepts the challenge and manages to hold his own until the entire Saint Shields clan gangs up on him. It looks like all is lost until a mysterious stranger steps in to save the battle and the day. The Saint Shields vow to return and fulfill their mission to capture and seal the four Bit-Beasts. Meanwhile, the stranger introduces himself as Zeo and reveals Takao has always been his idol.
| 82 | 31 | "Attack of The Rock Bit Beast"; Transliteration: "Sekiban seijū shūgeki!" (Japanese: 石版聖獣襲撃!) | 12 August 2002 | 16 November 2003 |
Daitokuji Kaichou and Judy show up at Takao's dojo empty-handed. Dr. Zagart and the mysterious rock have vanished without a trace. Knowing Dr. Zagart is the key to finding the missing rock, the Bladebreakers decide to launch their own search. One problem, they have no idea where to start looking. Meanwhile Dr. Zagart and the mysterious woman - now introduced as Dr. K - have designed a new powerful blade using the rock, and they've chosen a blader named Foxy to challenge the Bladebreakers. Zeo takes Takao for a visit at the beyblade gym where he trains. Meanwhile, Foxy breaks into Takao's house and attacks Rei, Hiromi and Kyojyu. Rei challenges him and they fight in a local park where Kai joins the audience. Foxy's rock powered Blade nearly destroys Rei's Blade but Takao shows up in the nick of time and coaches Rei to victory. The Bladebreakers congratulate Rei on his victory but the Saint Shields also witnessed the battle and discuss the new kind of rock bit-beasts.
| 83 | 32 | "Lots Of Questions... Few Answers"; Transliteration: "Wasurekaketa tamashī" (Japanese: 忘れかけた魂) | 19 August 2002 | 16 November 2003 |
The Bladebreakers try to figure out who or what was behind his attack, and how it all tied into the mysterious rock. Kyojyu finds out that the bit-beast used against Driger was certainly extracted from the rock. Meanwhile, Takao reaches a breaking point, discouraged and upset by the constant attempts of fanatic groups trying to steal the sacred bit-beasts. His anxiety goes overboard when he coaxes Kyojyu to create a wacky training platform for the team to practice with. He takes his jaded attitude out on Zeo, who simply wants to spar with one of the greats. At the Psykick's facilities, tension grows between Zagart and Doctor K. While the first wants deeper studies to better understand the rock and why Foxy was defeated, the latter prefers to keep extracting bit-beasts from it. Zagart ultimately orders Doctor K to follow his orders and she ends up instructing her assistant to secretly carry on with her personal project. Takao starts training Zeo and coaches him so he can pass his Beyblading exam. Meanwhile, the Saint Shields' frustration level grows, as Ozuma decides that it is time for them to start stealing the four bit-beasts.
| 84 | 33 | "Rock Bottom!"; Transliteration: "Sento· Shīruzu" (Japanese: セント·シールズ) | 26 August 2002 | 16 November 2003 |
Daitokuji Kaichou deciphers the words that are carved onto the mysterious rocks and reads the kids this warning; "Dare not disturb this stone, for here, the bit-beasts are sealed", written in a dialect that dates back to the ancient China times. Dickinson shows them a picture taken at the only place in the world where such language is still spoken, and the kids realize the people depicted are wearing the same type of clothing as the Saint Shields. The decide to go after the team to ask questions. Yusufu takes them to Ozuma among the woods and he reveals the history of the bit-beasts to the Bladebreakers, telling them of their origin ten thousand years ago as benevolent spirits until evil men discovered how to control them and use them for their own malicious needs. The Saint Shields' ancestors have tried to seal the four bit-beasts using the same beasts Ozuma and his mates have now, but they were too weak, and the bit-beasts escaped, never to be seen again. Since that time, the clan of the Saint Shields has made it their mission to seal the bit-beasts and save the world from destruction when the creatures reappear. since Dragoon, Dranzer, Driger and Draciel have all reappeared, it was time they did something to seal them back to the rock. Dunga issues a battle challenge to the Bladebreakers and Rei answers it with confidence, but Dunga's new Vortex Ape proves too much for Driger and it is captured before a shocked Rei. Back at their warehouse, the Saint Shields seal Driger in the stone. The Bladebreakers go into training and Rei proves much less capable. Takao reprehends him for being unfocused and he leaves frustrated that nobody respects his difficult situation. He battles a few amateur fans and realizes that bit-beasts are not what beyblading is all about. He then meets Zeo and congratulates him for another win. Rei is still down and Kai talks to him so that he is back to focus. After seeing that his friends have been practicing all day, he realizes he is not the only one who's affected by Driger's capture and gets back to training. At the Psykick's labs, Doctor K is informed about Driger's capture and demands the researches to be accelerated.
| 85 | 34 | "Itzy Bey-Itzy Spider"; Transliteration: "Monokage kara supaidā" (Japanese: 物陰からスパイダー) | 2 September 2002 | 6 December 2003 |
Zeo shows up at another Bladebreakers' training session and sees Draciel and Dragoon in the sky during battle. Suddenly, he decides he must have a bit-beast of his own, but everyone tells him you have to "earn" a bit-beast and it's "not a toy". Meanwhile, Doctor K has secretly extracted a spider bit-beast from the rock, under her assistant warnings that this is irregular since Zagart has not authorized such researches and gives it to a new blader named Net whose mission is to go out and capture Takao's Dragoon. As Takao races to a Junior Beyblade Tournament, Net cuts him off and draws him into battle. Zeo eventually interferes in Takao's favor, but is easily knocked out by Net. During the fight, the new Psykick recruit keeps telling Takao to release his Dragoon so he can steal it, but when Takao finally does, Dragoon wins and Net runs away crying. Takao rushes to the tournament and Zeo absorbs the lesson taught to him by the Bladebreakers, who invite him to train with them.
| 86 | 35 | "See No Bit Beast, Hear No Bit Beast"; Transliteration: "Sugata Naki Shikaku" (Japanese: 姿なき刺客) | 9 September 2002 | 7 December 2003 |
At night, Kai is busy practicing his Beyblade skills alone in the park when out of nowhere a gust of wind appears and starts slicing everything to pieces and damaging Dranzer. The same gust of wind attacks Takao and Zeo at the BBA gym, cutting Zeo's Zeronix in two and even creating a hole in the ground. They spot a suspicious kid leaving the room, but they quickly lose him. It turns out that it's the work of Jack, one of Dr. K's bladers, and he's got a bit-beast that harnesses the wind. Jack eventually attacks Max, too. Ozuma witness the attack and informs his team mates about this new fighter. Once the Bladebreakers figure that a bit-beast is behind the attack, Rei volunteers to fight, but Kai stops him. At night, Kai secretly sneaks out to battle Jack. Discovering Kai is gone, the gang runs and finds him just as he's about to begin the battle. The gang realizes Kai doesn't stand a chance against this wind bit-beast because he can't see it, but reluctantly, they let him fight, while the Saint Shields secretly watch from among the woods. An intense battle ensues and Kai takes a severe beating as he waits to catch a glimpse of Jack's bit-beast. Finally Kai summons Dranzer and spots the wind Bit-Beast, a weasel with sickles in place of arms, and defeats it. Jack runs off while Kai leaves the rest of Bladebreakers in awe for the damage Dranzer has taken as he walks off into the night.
| 87 | 36 | "Friends and Enemies"; Transliteration: "Makkusu to Mariamu" (Japanese: マックスとマリアム) | 16 September 2002 | 13 December 2003 |
Goaded by Dunga, Mariam goes off to capture Max's Draciel and finds him training by the river. Before she can challenge him, Dennis, the new Psykick recruit, tries to defeat Max. Using his new Bit Finder Kyojyu measures Dennis' bit-beast Tyranno's strength and is surprised when Dennis backs out of the battle before using its full power. Unaware that Mariam is following him, Max runs off in pursuit of Dennis and finds himself deep in the bowels of a mysterious building. He is ambushed by Dennis - who is now backed up by Dr. K and her technicians. Mariam lies in wait, planning on taking Draciel once Tyranno weakens him. But when she discovers that Dr. K is using Power Injection to make Tyranno even stronger mid-fight, Mariam launches Sharkrash and destroys the machinery. The systems overload and explode, compromising the building's structure. Max thanks Mariam for helping him, but she makes it clear that she was just making sure no one other than her captured Draciel. Despite the tension, both team up to find a way out of the building. Mariam acts cold towards Max until he saves her from falling down a hole that suddenly opened just before their feet. Max is hurt in the process but Mariam helps him treat his bruise. Max feels she is ultimately a nice person, but she insists they're enemies. When they finally find an exit in the form of a small hole on a wall, they realize they must use their beyblades to make it bigger. The join forces to enlarge the hole, but Mariam reminds him once again that they are enemies and leaves.
| 88 | 37 | "Beybattle at the Bit-Beast Corral"; Transliteration: "Senjō no Yuenchi" (Japanese: 戦場の遊園地) | 23 September 2002 | 1 February 2004 |
Fed up with all the recent attempts by Zagart and others to acquire the Bladebreakers bit-beasts, the Saint Shields decide to take action. They challenge the Bladebreakers to a match at an abandoned amusement park at the outskirts of town. The Bladebreakers spend the night discussing the match, while the Saint Shields make one last training session and vow to fulfill their mission. In the amusement park's wild west area, Mariam and Max are the first to engage in battle. The match goes back and forth as their bit-beasts take giant form and thrash about the wild west saloon. It ends in a draw, and while Max laments his draw, Ozuma harshly asks Mariam if she is still aware of their mission. He also says that Yusufu and Dunga are supposed to back Mariam up when at his signal. Max and Mariam go for another round. Over the course of it, Max's bond with Draciel makes Mariam realize she and her bit-beast Sharkrash share an equal closeness. Max's determination not just to win, but to fight for the return of Rei's bit-beast Driger culminates in Mariam's defeat. But she's not as upset as losing as she thought she'd be. Mariam realizes how much Max has taught her about treating her own Bit-Beast with respect, and how the determination of an entire team can overcome any obstacle. She says she feels confident that Max and the others are capable of protecting their bit-beasts, but Ozuma ends the chapter by saying he doesn't think so.
| 89 | 38 | "The Fate of The Spark Battle"; Transliteration: "Innen no Supāku Batoru" (Japanese: 因縁のスパークバトル) | 30 September 2002 | 1 February 2004 |
Dunga goes into battle against Kai and the fight intensifies as the blades race along the rails of an abandoned roller coaster to what looks like their doom. But suddenly, Yusufu launches his blade and both Dunga and Yusufu gang up on Kai. But just when things start to heat up, Rei launches his new blade to try to even the score. As the battle rages, the roller coaster collapses part by part around all the blades. The roller coaster chart starts riding and eventually falls out of the structure, exploding and creating a wall of fire, which is soon put out by the rain. Eventually, some energized wires threaten Dranzer, Vortex Ape and Vanishing Moot. Rei has Driger break the power box's door and expose the power switch. However, before he can have it shut down, Yusufu has his blade stop it. When part of the roller coaster structure is about to fall on Rei, Driger breaks free from the rock to protect Rei and return to the beyblade. Together, Rei and Kai defeat their opponents. Ozuma steps up and warns Takao his Dragoon will be the next to be sealed as the skies clear.
| 90 | 39 | "The Bit Beast Bond"; Transliteration: "Kizuna to Puraido" (Japanese: 絆とプライド) | 7 October 2002 | 1 February 2004 |
Ozuma makes a final play for the Bladebreakers four bit-beasts. Before the battle starts, Ozuma recalls the time when the leader of his tribe informed him of his mission and the heavy training he has been subjected to since then. Ozuma uses this memoirs mid-battle to make him stronger and eventually corners Takao, attacking him with full force and even putting his own bit-beast at stake by burning itself to the limit. Dragoon manages to break free, but Ozuma points numerous pieces of Dragoon spread across the battlefield, making it clear to Takao that he means business. In a quiet moment of reflection, Takao communicates with Dragoon for a second and final time in the series and they decide to fight the good fight no matter what the result. Takao and Dragoon lock horns with Ozuma's bit-beast and weave a path of destruction on the playing field. The match ends in a tie with a burned Flash Leopard and a severely damaged Dragoon. Ozuma realizes that Takao and the Bladebreakers are worthy enough to look after the four Bit-Beasts on their own and walks away with the rest of the Saint Shields.
| 91 | 40 | "Squeeze Play"; Transliteration: "Yūjō no Akashi" (Japanese: 友情の証) | 14 October 2002 | 7 February 2004 |
Pleased that the Saint Shields no longer wish to seal the four bit-beasts, Dr. K gives a new blader, Denny, a powerful, octopus-like rock bit-beast named Klarken and orders him to capture the four sacred bit-beasts. Meanwhile, the Bladebreakers are training by the sea and Kyojyu asks Rei to test a new weigh disk he developed in a battle against Max. With this new addition, Driger easily knocks Draciel out. Zeo catches up with them and shows them his invitation to the upcoming World Championships. To his surprise, the kids invite him to practice with them but are interrupted by the sudden arrival by boat of Denny who challenges them to a battle. Rei answers the challenge and Denny takes him to the edge of a nearby cliff at Doctor K's request. Rei manages to hold his own against the powerful Klarken. When Denny launches a second Beyblade, releasing yet another Klarken, Driger is overpowered and the battle seems lost. It is Zeo who comes to the rescue, refusing to back down despite having no bit-beast of his own. Inspired by Zeo's courage and determination and enraged that Zeo got his beyblade destroyed by Denny, Rei rises to the occasion, vanquishing the two Klarken's and sends Denny packing. As the Psykick boat sails away, Doctor K emerges at the deck and stares at the Bladebreakers. She spots and recognizes Zeo and asks "what on Earth is he doing there". In gratitude for Zeo's attitude, Takao makes him the fifth member of the Bladebreakers.
| 92 | 41 | "Who's Your Daddy?"; Transliteration: "Totsuzen no Sayonara..." (Japanese: 突然のサヨナラ...) | 21 October 2002 | 21 February 2004 |
The Bladebreakers show up at the World Championship Tournament and go up into the stands to cheer on Zeo, who's fighting in the preliminaries. Takao is pumped watching his new friend who wins his first fight. Later backstage, Takao tells Zeo he's totally impressed and asks if Zeo would like to become his training partner. Zeo excitedly agrees. Meanwhile, at Psykick's lab, Zagart finally finds out that Doctor K has been secretly extracting bit-beasts from the rock. Furious, he interrupts her research and fires her just as she is on the verge of removing the strongest bit-beast sealed in it. Zeo is shown arriving at his mansion, happy that he advanced to the next round at the World Championship. That night, he greets his father as he arrives, and it is revealed that the father is Zagart. Zeo is eager to tell him of his success at the tournament, but Zagart coldly sends him to his room and walks away. Later, an angry Doctor K (accompanied by her main assistant) shows up to confront her former boss in his house and as she does, Zeo overhears the entire conversation. Zeo realizes it's his dad who's been after the Bladebreakers' Bit-Beasts and cries. As the argument continues, Zeo accidentally drops his beyblade, alerting everyone of his presence. Doctor K leaves but not before telling Zagart of Zeo's partnership with Takao and the others. Furious, Zagart grabs Zeo and puts him up against a wall, then drops him (this is not shown in the English dub and the versions based on it). Zagart explains to Zeo that he needs the power of the four bit-beasts and gives him Cerberus, the strongest bit-beast from the rock (the one Doctor K was about to extract before being fired), telling him that he must steal his friends' bit-beasts. Zeo asks him why, and Zagart explains, but that's not shown. Instead, the anime jumps to the point where Zeo is shocked by whatever his father just told him. On the following day, the Bladebreakers' are worried about Zeo and are informed by his partner at the World Championship that he quit. He spends the whole day walking and reflecting about the secret he was just told and eventually comes upon the Bladebreakers. They try to confront him but he ends his friendship with them and leaves, crying. As he arrives home, he demands his father to give him Cerberus.
| 93 | 42 | "Fortunes Dear and Dire"; Transliteration: "Aku no Pātsu kari" (Japanese: 悪のパーツ狩り) | 28 October 2002 | 22 February 2004 |
Zeo focuses on Beyblade training with his father Zagart. The most powerful rock Bit-Beast named Cerberus is designated for Zeo, but he must first be able to summon it. Zeo trains furiously against another Psykick recruit named Gordo, but the elusive bit-beast never fully materializes. Meanwhile, the Bladebreakers must choose their two team-pairs for the World Beyblade Championships. Hiromi brings in a pile of her fortune-telling books to help. They decide that Takao will team with Max, and Kai with Rei. Then, they head for the preliminary rounds of the World Championship. A couple of beybladers are seen watching the games and saying the competing bladers are "amateurs". Not long afterward, Kai is training at the beach and the same pair meets him, impressed by Dranzer. They talk Kai into battling them, with Dranzer's attack ring up for grabs if they win. To Kai's surprise, not only do they have bit-beasts of their own, but they're not above tag-teaming him to avoid defeat. By the end of the battle, Dranzer is so damaged that its attack ring is useless, which sends the couple on their way empty-handed. When Kai discusses the incident with his Bladebreaker teammates, it's discovered that they are known as King and Queen and are infamous "parts hunters" - bladers who search for high-end Beyblade parts from others that they can acquire for themselves. Back at Zagart's lab, Zeo tries summoning Cerberus one last time – his 42nd attempt - and succeeds. Cerberus is a massively powerful canine bit-beast with three snarling heads that disintegrates Gordo's beyblade against a wall. Zeo then wows to beat the Bladebreakers and acquire their bit-beasts.
| 94 | 43 | "Kai's Royal Flush"; Transliteration: "Kai no Ribenji Batoru" (Japanese: カイのリベンジバトル) | 4 November 2002 | 28 February 2004 |
Kai is given a brand new Beyblade crafted for him by Kyojyu and longs for a rematch against King and Queen. Doctor K is also after them and tracks the duo down to offer them a chance to team up with her so they can capture and wield the power of the four sacred bit-beasts together. The pair blow her off, interested only in their quests for stealing the perfect Beyblade parts. Eventually, Kai is informed that both are fighting kids for their parts. Kai heads for the location and demands them a revenge. The battle is fierce, and eventually Kai's Dranzer throws King's Ariel towards a tree, which falls between them. Dranzer is left spinning, but the pair disappears, meaning the fight has no outcome. They are later seen at Doctor K's car and learn that Dranzer was one of the sacred bit-beasts. Later, Takao advances to the finals of the championship and the team learns that King and Queen have entered the finals. Kane and Jim, the Psykick's ex-recruits that battled the Bladebreakers at the Psykick tower, are back in town and are also competing in the finals while Goki and Salima travel around the World to teach kids how to beyblade. At Psykick's lab, Gordo is chosen as Zeo's partner at the tournament and is given Orthrus, a two-headed canine bit-beast from the rock.
| 95 | 44 | "The Calm Before The Storm"; Transliteration: "Haran no Sekai-sen Zen'ya" (Japanese: 波乱の世界戦前夜) | 11 November 2002 | 29 February 2004 |
After disappearing thirty years ago, Dr. Zagart confronts Daitokuji Kaichou in his room, forcing him to enter Zeo and Gordo in the World Championship preliminaries. Takao, Max, Hiromi and Kyojyu arrive and finally meet their enemy. He reveals to them that Zeo is his son and that he won't show mercy when he confronts the Bladebreakers in the tournament. The Bladebreakers try to attend Zeo's match so they can find out what's happened to him but arrive at the arena too late - they are informed that Zeo and Gordo advanced in a matter of minutes, ending most of their matches with only one hit. Meanwhile, Dr. K works with King and Queen to improve their powers so they can get the four sacred bit-beasts for her. At the World Championship's opening night gala, the Bladebreakers meet Kane and Jim, King and Queen, and the Saint Shields, who have also advanced to the finals. The final pairings are announced: Zeo and Gordo (absent from the event) vs. Ozuma and Dunga; Kai and Rei vs. Sanchez and Marcos, the Central American champions; Yusufu and Mariam vs. King and Queen; and Kane and Jim vs. Takao and Max. As Kaichou delivers his speech, King and Queen interrupt him and say they don't care about beyblading, just about Takao and his team mates and that the rest of the competitors are irrelevant. This enrages Dunga and he starts a no-rules beybattle against King in the middle of the crowd. They take the match outside but the Bladebreakers manage to stop the duel. Zeo and Gordo are shown at the building looking down on the other finalists.
| 96 | 45 | "Zeo vs. Ozuma"; Transliteration: "Zeo vs Ozuma" (Japanese: ゼオVSオズマ) | 18 November 2002 | 6 March 2004 |
The Beyblade World Championship Finals are underway and the eight pairs are introduced with King and Queen being heavily booed. In this final part, each team member fight one sudden death match. Teams with two wins advance to the next round. If there is one win and one loss for each competing team, then the winners of each match will face each other in a tiebreaker. Takao tries to talk to Zeo before his match begins, but Gordo pushes him against the wall (this is not shown in the English dub and versions based on it). Zeo eventually emerges from his room and agrees to talk. Takao asks Zeo to explain his actions to him and says they are "friends" but Zeo rejects this and makes it clear once again that now they are enemies. Ozuma, who overheard the conversation, confronts Takao and says if he's not capable of realizing that Zeo is now his enemy, he will seal Dragoon right away to protect it. Takao understands and heads for the stands to watch them fight. Once the competition begins, Zeo's team mate Gordo makes short work of Dunga. Then it's Zeo turn. It's a very intense battle, with Zeo motivated by his need to capture the four bit-beasts and Ozuma motivated by his mission of protecting them, and Zeo seems unable to overcome Ozuma's power, but when he remembers his father telling him of a still-unrevealed secret, he summons up his power and calls upon Cerberus, which surprises everyone. At this point, Kyojyu's laptop malfunctions due to some interference. Ozuma brings Flash Leopard out and gives everything he's got, setting his beyblade on fire (though this was for some reason cut from the English dub and versions based on it), but loses anyway.
| 97 | 46 | "Black And White Evil Powers"; Transliteration: "Kuro to Shiro no Ma no Te" (Japanese: 黒と白の魔の手) | 25 November 2002 | 7 March 2004 |
The World Beyblade Championships continue and the next round has Takao and Max squaring off against Kane and Jim. Kane and Jim decide to have a little practice battle at the beach, but King and Queen show up and jump into battle in a surprise attack, destroying their Beyblades and forcing them to withdraw from the tournament. In tears, they are later comforted by the Bladebreakers. The next battle up is King and Queen facing Mariam and Yusufu from the Saint Shields in a special stadium with magnets placed above and below the beyblades, creating magnetic fields that provide a considerable obstacle for the competitors. Mariam and Queen launch first, and as they battle, King suddenly launches his blades making it two against one. The officials are about to call off the fight when Yusufu tells them not to do so and joins in the fray. In the end, King and Queen combine forces and first attack Mariam and then Yusufu, dismantling both their beyblades and stealing their attack rings. The crowd is stunned as they qualify to face Max and Takao in the semi-final.
| 98 | 47 | "Deceit From Above"; Transliteration: "Tokihanata Reta Akui" (Japanese: 解き放たれた悪意) | 2 December 2002 | 13 March 2004 |
Rei and Kai fight the last quarter-final match for the World Championship and win over Sanchez and Marcos with no great difficulties and advance to the semi-final round where they will face Zeo and Gordo. Takao and Max are next and must face King and Queen for the other semi-final. Doctor K tempts Queen into using a vicious new attack ring she's created called "The Shredder". Queen uses it against Max, and nearly grinds Draciel into a pulp. But using the new Draciel V2 Judy gave him, and having the will of the crowd and his teammates behind him, Max overcomes this attack, reverses her ring and destroys Queen's beyblade, winning the first match of the best-of-two. Next up, is King versus Takao, who has an improved Beyblade of his own, thanks to Kyojyu. Angered by the failure of Doctor K's attack ring, King dissolves his partnership with the scientist and vows to combat Takao without her assistance. The resulting match is an intense, high-powered battle that's not only fair, but completely up for grabs. When Takao's blade begins faltering for some unknown reason, the combatants spot Doctor K high above the stadium. Through a rooftop window, she's using a particle beam to try and disable Dragoon. Disgusted by her attempt to throw the match, King and Takao put aside their differences, combine their Bit-Beasts' attack, and interrupt her attack. Zagart approaches her and destroys the weapon, telling her she's "over". With the playing field even again, the Blader's resume their match and Takao wins. King's display of honesty generates a newfound respect for King and Queen from the Bladebreakers and they promise to acquire experience instead of beyblade parts. Takao and Max advance to the final.
| 99 | 48 | "Phoenix Falling"; Transliteration: "Gekishin no Batoru Noizu" (Japanese: 激震のバトルノイズ) | 9 December 2002 | 14 March 2004 |
The second semi-final round begins pitting Kai and Rei against Zeo and Gordo. Rei faces Gordo first and attacks fiercely but Orthrus always seems to evade Driger's attacks. Zagart has programmed all of the Bladebreakers moves into Zeo and Gordo's Beyblades, making them unbeatable. Soon, Driger is almost out of power and Gordo seizes his chance. But when Kai reminds Rei of the pain he felt losing Driger to Dunga, Rei taps into his Beyblade spirit and helps Driger salvage a tie. Victory now rests on Kai's shoulders. Kai and Zeo begin a fierce battle, taking the fight to the stands and the video screen and unleashing so much power that the stadium begins to take damage. The duel becomes a matter of endurance. As the effects of one final, powerful blast subside, Kai falls to Zeo and witness Dranzer being taken away by Cerberus. Zeo and Gordo advance to the finals where they are expected to face Takao and Max.
| 100 | 49 | "The Enemy Within"; Transliteration: "Takao VS Kai Yūjō no Tatakai" (Japanese: タカオVSカイ友情の戦い) | 16 December 2002 | 20 March 2004 |
Takao confronts Zeo over stealing Dranzer, but once again he states that he is determined to win and that Dragoon will be his. Impressed, Takao wants Max to focus on the battle so that they don't lose but he comes off harsh on is partner and Hiromi throws her bag onto his head (this is not shown in the English dub and versions based on it) to make him realize he shouldn't mistreat his own partner like that. Meanwhile, Kyojyu studies Kai and Zeo's match and discovers his laptop had the same interference problem it had when Zeo was facing Ozuma. Kyojyu then makes an astonishing discovery and takes it to Kaichou, who is also shocked by the news, though they remain unrevealed to the viewer. Kai, racked with guilt over the loss of Dranzer, decides to quit beyblading. Hiromi tries to change his mind but Kai is determined to never touch a beyblade again. All alone, Takao visits the beystadium where he will fight the final match of the Beyblade World Championships. He has a vision and sees his friends and teammates and begins to realize what they mean to him. Suddenly Kai appears and forces Takao into a beyblade battle hoping that he will stop doubting himself and focus on his important match with Zeo. The rest of the Bladebreakers show up and witness the battle. Takao realizes that with his friends by his side he can win the championship again.
| 101 | 50 | "Clash of the Tyson"; Transliteration: "Shijō saidai no Kesshōsen" (Japanese: 史上最大の決勝戦) | 23 December 2002 | 27 March 2004 |
The Championship Finals begin as Takao faces Gordo. Despite Orthrus' increased size and power, Takao and Dragoon emerge victorious due to their spiritual link and destroy Orthrus. Determined to win back Dranzer for Kai, Max battles with an intensity he's never had before and pushes Zeo to the brink of defeat. By then, Kyojyu's laptop detects the same interference seen when Zeo faced Ozuma and Kai and decides to get Kaichou to confront Zagart about their recent, still unrevealed discovery about Zeo. Zagart listens to their pleas but refuses to pull Zeo from the match despite the strain that he is putting on his body. He reasons that Zeo is no longer under his control and is fighting for himself. Back to the battle, Zeo eventually summons a super bit-beast that combines the powers of Cerberus and Dranzer and overwhelms Draciel, capturing it in the process. The final victory comes down to a tie-breaking match between Zeo and Takao. As the match begins, Kyojyu tells his friends at the stands that "Zeo is a Robot" and as Zeo attacks, his body succumbs to the pressure brought upon it and a part of his right arm is damaged, revealing mechanic parts under its skin.
| 102 | 51 | "Destiny of The Final Battle"; Transliteration: "Shukumei no Rasuto Batoru" (Japanese: 宿命のラストバトル) | 30 December 2002 | 28 March 2004 |
It is revealed that Zeo is an android and Kyojyu deduces he will try to defeat Takao before his entire body short circuits. Zeo eventually explains he's a robot Zagart created to replace his real son who died in a tragic accident. And according to his father, if Zeo can capture Takao's Dragoon, then by using all the Sacred bit-beasts powers, Zeo could be turned into a real boy. The battle rages on and Zeo seems to be the aggressor. Takao tries to rally, but each move he makes is countered by the aggressive Zeo, who eventually calls upon Draciel and Dranzer to increase Cerberus' power. Takao himself gets knocked out of the stadium right under Max's feet, who helps him get back up again (Takao flying towards Max is not shown in the English dub and versions based on it). Eventually Cerberus multiplies and Takao starts facing three beyblades at once. Takao summons all his remaining strength and destroys the two extra beyblades, sets Draciel and Dranzer free and defeats Zeo. Zeo is sad to realize he'll never become a boy, but Takao convinces him to be happy with who he is and that he must be able to do many things a normal person can't. The Bladebreakers greet him as the World champion once again.
