= Gordon Wilson (footballer, born 1944) =

Scottish footballer & rugby union player

Personal information
- Full name: Henry Gordon Wilson
- Date of birth: 21 March 1944 (age 82)
- Place of birth: Glasgow, Scotland
- Position: Goalkeeper

Senior career*
Years	Team	Apps	(Gls)
- Netherlee Church
1966–1969	Queen's Park	45	(0)
1971	Hawick Royal Albert		
1973–1974	Netherlee Church		
1979	Queen's Park	2	(0)

International career
1966–1974	Scotland Amateurs	14	(0)
Rugby union career
Senior career
Years	Team	Apps	(Points)
1974	Melrose		
–	Selkirk		
–	Edinburgh Wanderers		
- * Club domestic league appearances and goals

Henry Gordon Wilson (born 21 March 1944) is a Scottish retired amateur footballer who played in the Scottish League for Queen's Park as a goalkeeper. He was capped by Scotland at amateur level. Wilson also played rugby union.
