= Thomas Walsh (mobster) =

Thomas "Fat" or "Fatty" Walsh (died March 7, 1929) was a New York mobster involved in narcotics and an associate of Dutch Schultz and Charles "Lucky" Luciano.

He was taken in for questioning along with Luciano and George Uffner regarding the 1928 gangland slaying of Arnold Rothstein, of whom he was a former bodyguard with Jack "Legs" Diamond, however he and the others were later released. He was later killed at the Miami Biltmore Hotel in Coral Gables, Florida during a gambling dispute on March 4, 1929.

It has been claimed that his ghost haunts the hotel elevator, doors opening and closing and lights blinking on and off.
