= Gordon Wilson (footballer, born 1904) =

English footballer (1904–1947)

Personal information
- Full name: Gordon Gill Wilson
- Date of birth: 18 June 1904
- Place of birth: West Auckland, England
- Date of death: 1947 (aged 42–43)
- Position: Full-back

Senior career*
| Years | Team | Apps | (Gls) |
| 1920–1921 | Evenwood Juniors | | |
| 1921–1922 | Middlesbrough | 0 | (0) |
| 1922–1924 | Evenwood Town | | |
| 1924–1925 | West Auckland Town | | |
| 1925 | Scotswood | | |
| 1925–1931 | Hull City | 28 | (0) |
| 1931–1932 | Luton Town | 7 | (0) |
| 1932–1934 | Norwich City | 2 | (0) |
| 1934–1935 | Barrow | 19 | (0) |
| 1935 | Linfield | | |
| Total | | 56 | (1) |
- * Club domestic league appearances and goals

Gordon Gill Wilson (18 June 1904 – 1947) was an English footballer who played in the Football League for Barrow, Hull City, Luton Town and Norwich City.
