= James G. Batterson =

American designer and builder (1823–1901)

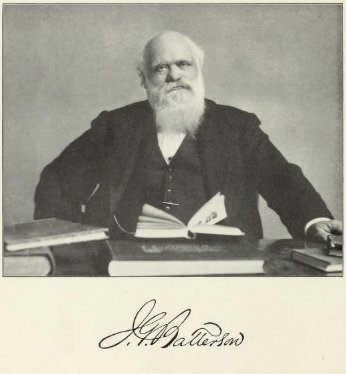
- Born: February 23, 1823. Bloomfield, Connecticut
- Died: September 18, 1901 (aged 78); Hartford, Connecticut
- Occupations: Designer and builder
- Known for: Owner of New England Granite Works from 1845

James Goodwin Batterson (February 23, 1823 – September 18, 1901) was an American designer and builder, the owner of New England Granite Works from 1845 and a founder in 1863 of Travelers Insurance Company, both in Hartford, Connecticut. He introduced casualty insurance in the United States, for which he was posthumously inducted into the Insurance Hall of Fame (1965).

== Biography ==
Batterson was born in Bloomfield, Connecticut. He was prepared for college but did not attend (he was later awarded honorary degrees of M. A. from both Yale University and Williams College); instead he immersed himself in his father's business in quarrying and importing stone, briefly studied law, then opened a granite and marble company. Batterson spent several years in Egypt, and was recognized as such an authority of Egyptology, he became honorary secretary of the Egyptian Exploration Fund. While in Europe he studied art and wrote poetry. In England he was impressed with the record and success of the Railway Passenger Assurance Company, and resolved to gather a group of progressive men to launch a similar venture in the United States, the Travelers Insurance Company. He remained in charge until his death in 1901.

Before the Civil War he designed and built the monument to Gen. William J. Worth, New York City (1857). after the war Batterson supplied many cemetery and civil monuments.

As chairman of the Connecticut State War Committee in the Civil War he served as a construction consultant for the Union.

As Batterson was a leading supplier of granite and other construction stone, President Abraham Lincoln appointed him building contractor for the Library of Congress building in Washington, D.C. Batterson also constructed the Masonic Temple in New York City and the Connecticut State Capitol in Hartford, designed by Richard M. Upjohn. He also constructed the Connecticut Mutual Life Insurance Building, Hartford, the Mutual Life Insurance Building, New York, the Equitable Life Insurance Building, New York, and the William K. Vanderbilt residence Marble House, Newport, Rhode Island. He had granite quarries at Westerly, Rhode Island, and at Concord, New Hampshire, and introduced mechanical granite polishing.

Batterson traveled to Italy to find talented sculptors to work on his designs for bronze and stone sculptures for national cemeteries and Civil War monuments. Many of the largest Civil War monuments were built by Batterson, including The American Volunteer at Antietam National Cemetery (Carl Conrads, sculptor, George Keller, architect); and the Soldiers' National Monument at Gettysburg National Cemetery (Randolph Rogers, sculptor, George Keller, architect). He erected the granite statue, Alexander Hamilton, in Central Park, New York City (Carl Conrads, sculptor); the Thayer Monument at West Point, New York (Carl Conrads, sculptor); the Texas Heroes Monument in Galveston, Texas (Louis Amateis, sculptor); and the Halleck Monument at San Francisco (Carl Conrads, sculptor).

He joined forces with Elizabeth Colt to make the Wadsworth Atheneum a free public institution; on 16 October 1880, he was honored at the Atheneum by ex-President Ulysses S. Grant for his contributions to historic preservation. He founded Cedar Hill Cemetery, Hartford, where he is interred and where many of his granite monuments may be seen.

He married Eunice Elizabeth, daughter of Jonathan Goodwin, of Hartford, in 1851.

He died on September 18, 1901, in Hartford, Connecticut.

Batterson Hall at the University of Connecticut commemorates his name.
