= New England Granite Works =

Firm incorporated in 1871 by James G. Batterson

The New England Granite Works was a firm incorporated in Hartford, Connecticut on June 16, 1871 by James G. Batterson. It was notable for creating a large number of works in the New England area until it was dissolved on June 26, 1926.

== Projects ==
- Samuel Colt Monument, Cedar Hill Cemetery, Hartford, Connecticut (1862–64), Randolph Rogers, sculptor, James G. Batterson, architect.
- Soldiers' National Monument, Gettysburg National Cemetery, Gettysburg, Pennsylvania (1866–69), Randolph Rogers, sculptor, George Keller, architect.
- Connecticut State Capitol, Hartford, Connecticut (1872–78), Richard M. Upjohn, architect.
- U.S. Soldier Monument, Antietam National Cemetery, Carl Conrads, sculptor, George Keller, architect (1876–80). Prior to being placed at the National Cemetery the statue was used as an "industrial exhibit" for the firm at the Centennial Exhibition in Philadelphia in 1876.
- Alexander Hamilton statue, Central Park, New York City (1880), Carl Conrads, sculptor.
- Thayer Monument, West Point, New York (1883), Carl Conrads, sculptor.
- Library of Congress, Washington, D.C. (1890–97), John L. Smithmeyer and Paul J. Pelz, architects.
- Edwin Lister Monument in Sleepy Hollow Cemetery, Westchester County, New York (ca. 1898), featured in the company catalog to showcase its skill in creating one-of-a-kind, custom memorials.

== Gallery ==
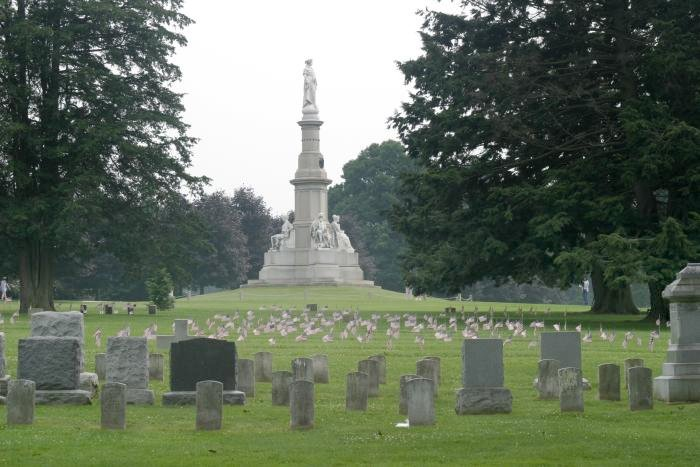
Soldiers' National Monument, Gettysburg National Cemetery, Gettysburg, Pennsylvania (1866–69).

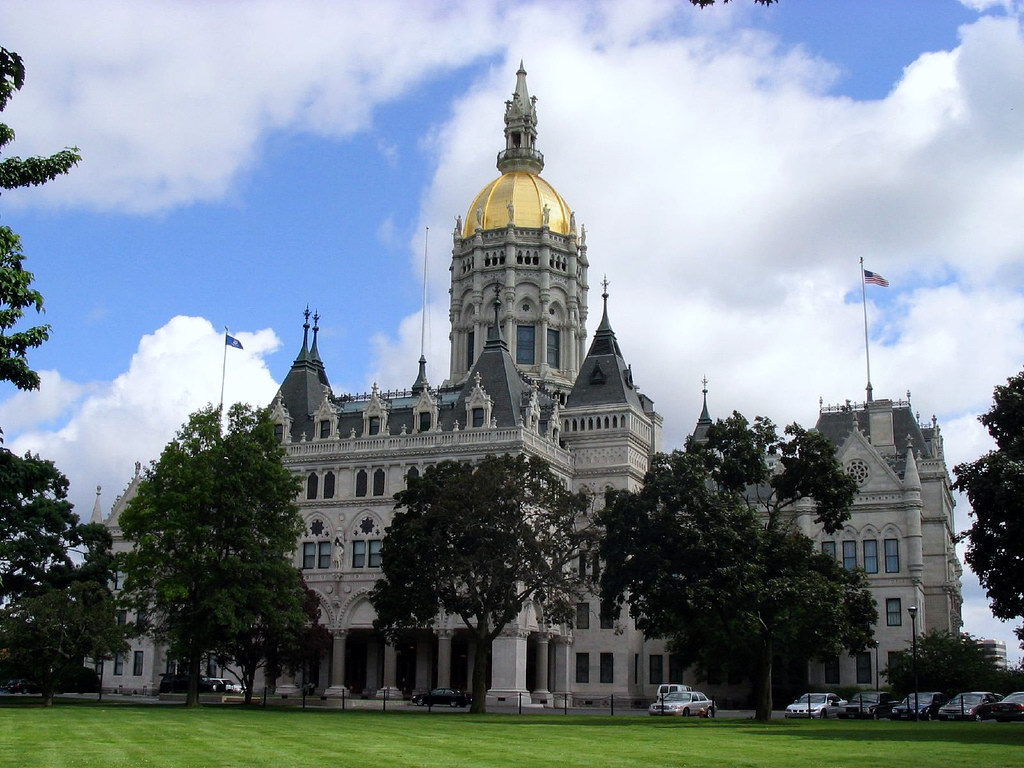
Connecticut State Capitol, Hartford, Connecticut (1872–78).

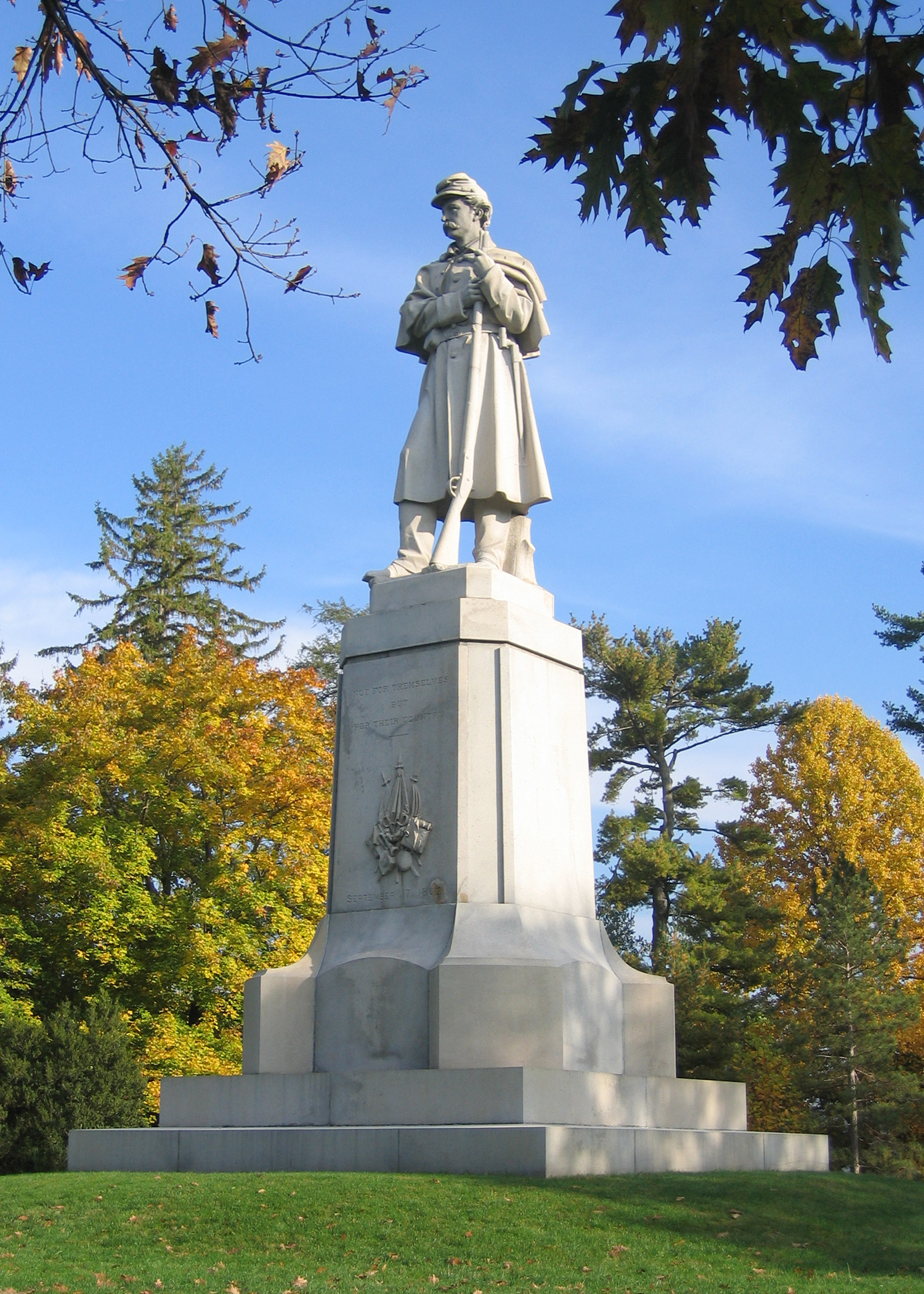
U.S. Soldier Monument, Antietam National Cemetery, Sharpsburg, Maryland (1876–80).

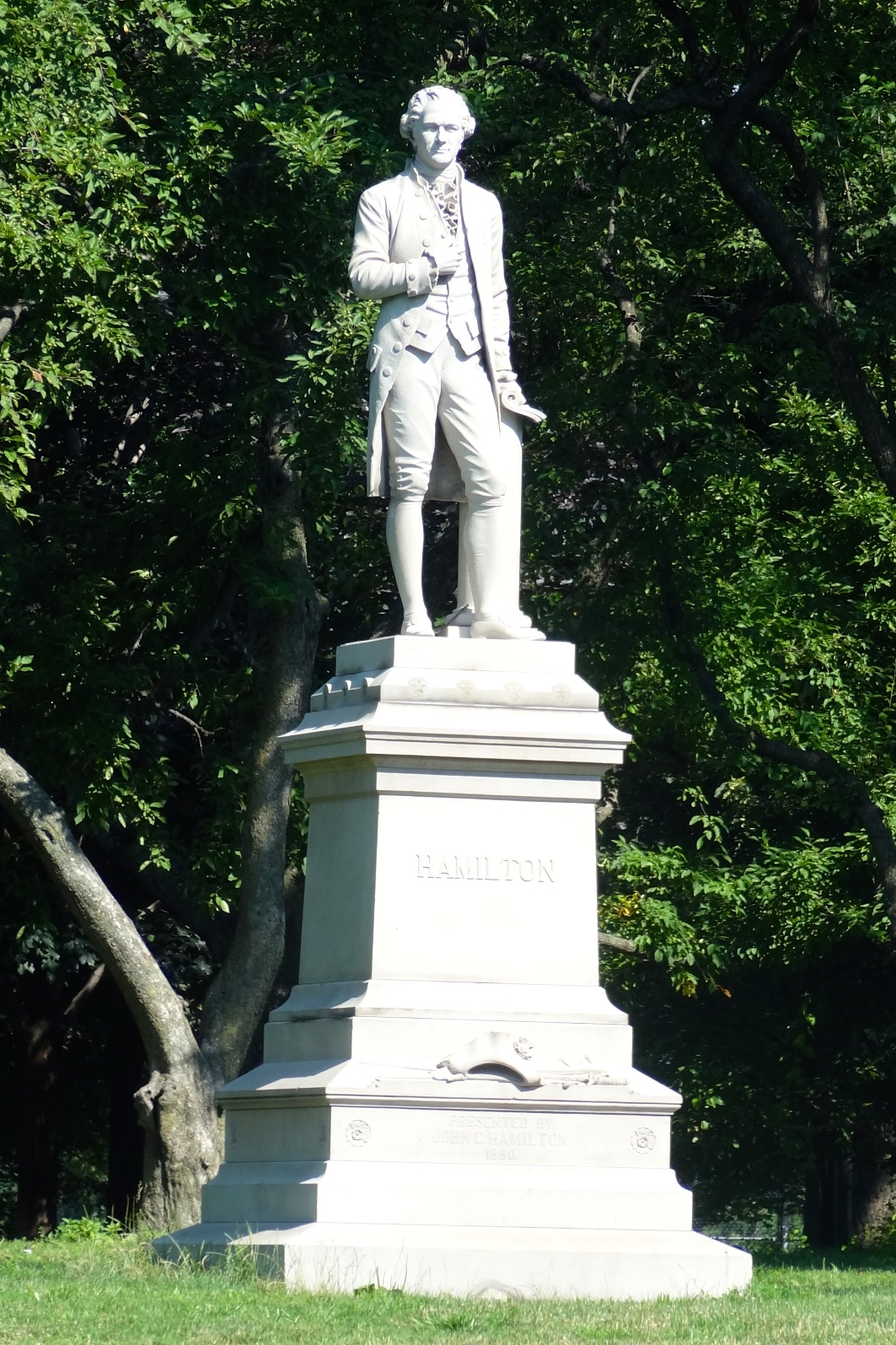
Alexander Hamilton, Central Park, New York City (1880).

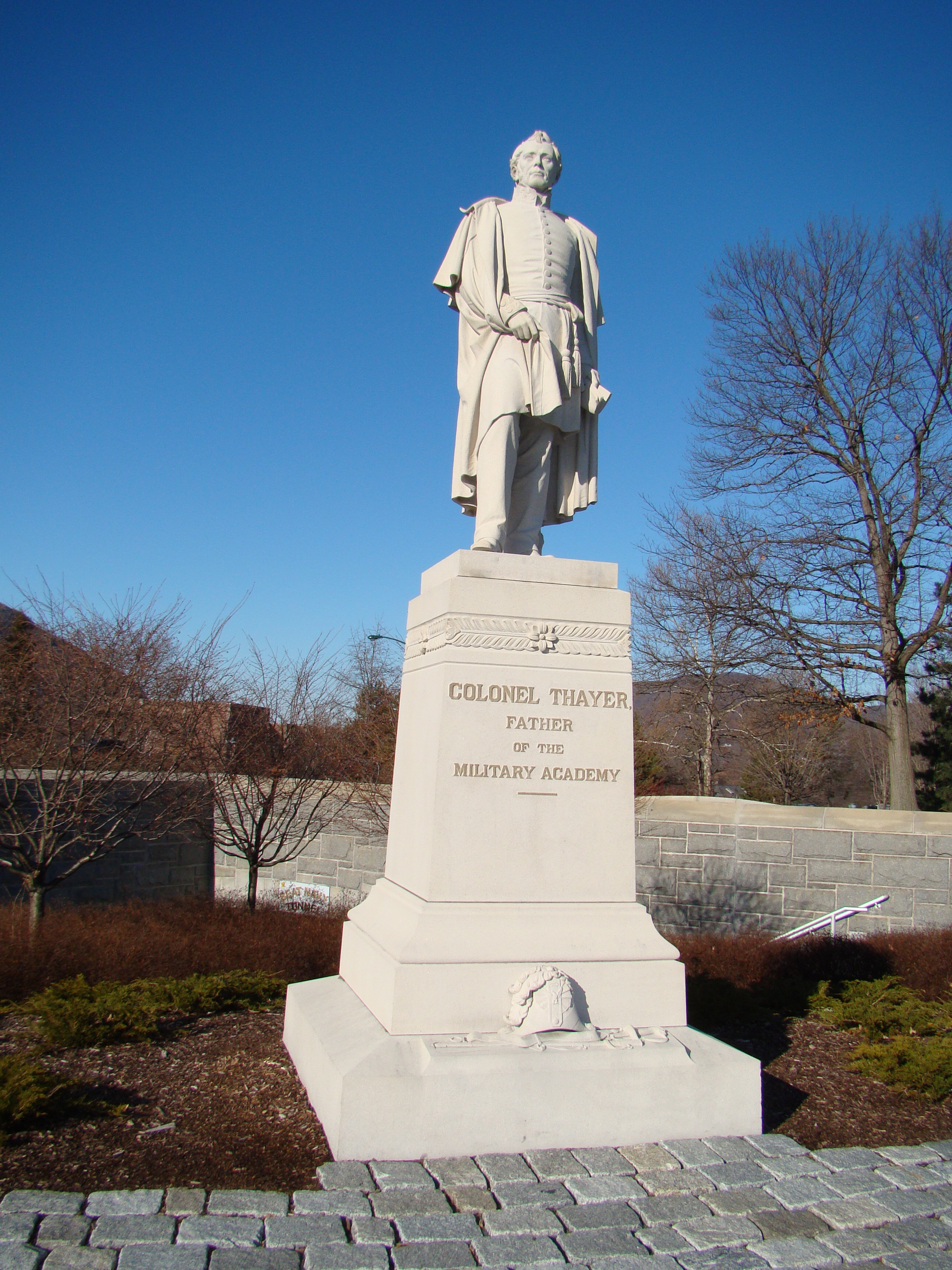
Thayer Monument, West Point, New York (1883).

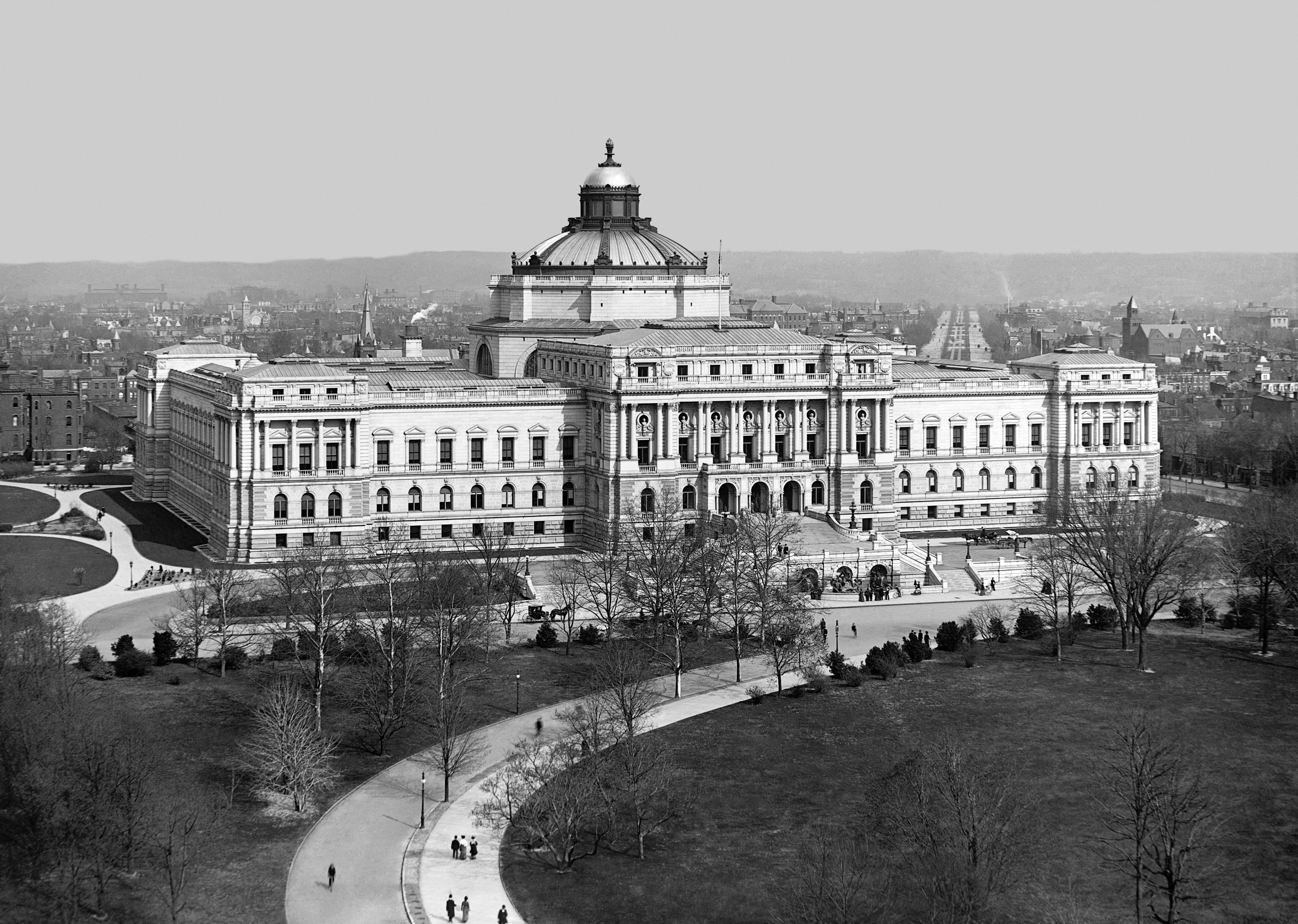
Library of Congress (1890–97).
