= Statue of Daniel Webster =

Statue of Daniel Webster may refer to:

- Statue of Daniel Webster (Boston), Massachusetts, U.S.
- Statue of Daniel Webster (New York City), New York, U.S.
- Statue of Daniel Webster (U.S. Capitol), Washington, D.C., U.S.

== See also ==
- Daniel Webster Memorial
