= Statue of Alexander Hamilton (Central Park) =

Statue by Carl Conrads in Central Park, Manhattan, New York, U.S.

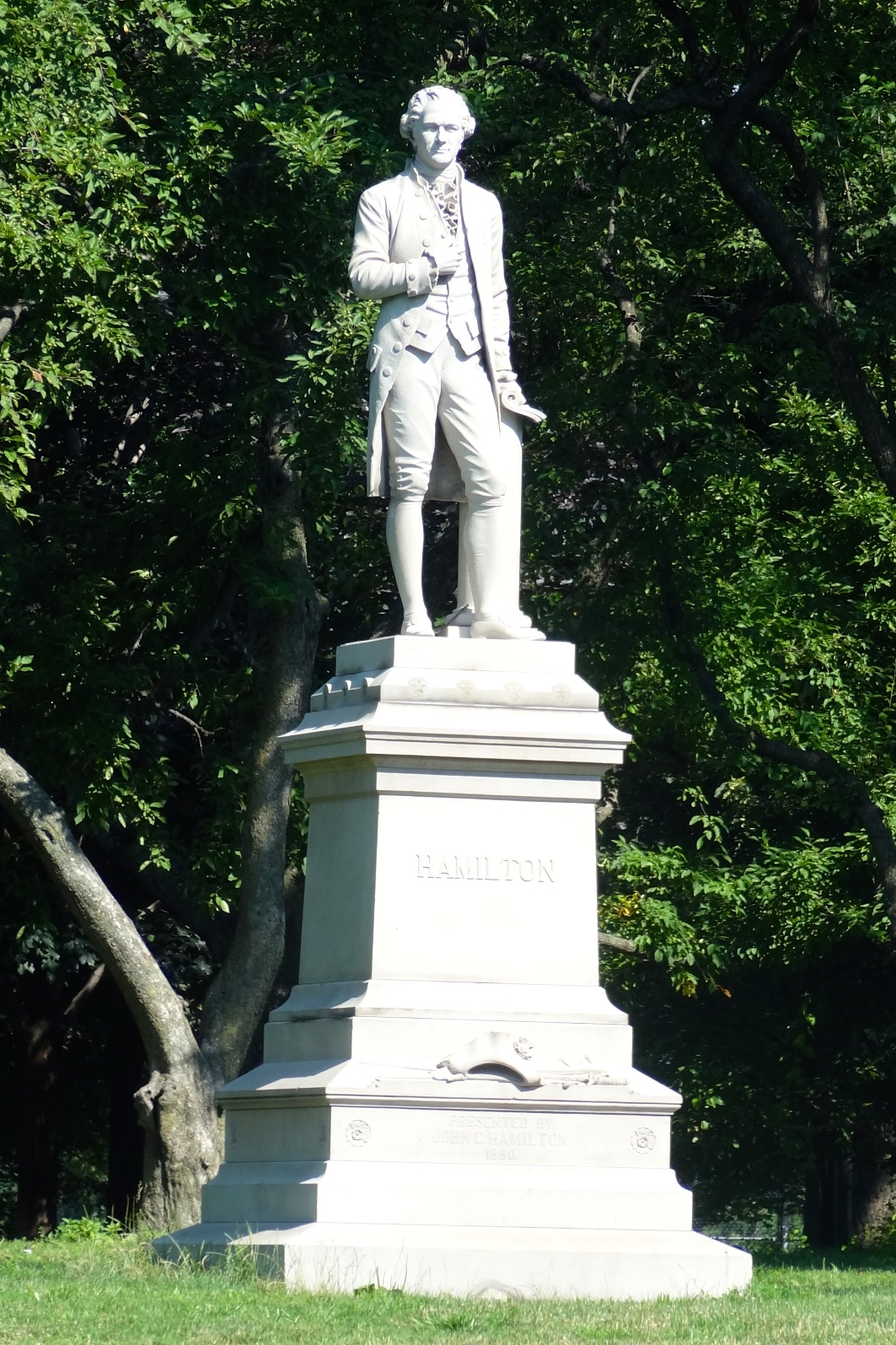

- Location in Manhattan
- Artist: Carl Conrads
- Year: 1880
- Type: Sculpture
- Medium: Westerly granite
- Subject: Alexander Hamilton
- Location: New York City, New York, United States; 40°46′51.7″N 73°57′52.4″W

An outdoor granite sculpture of Alexander Hamilton by Carl Conrads is installed in Central Park, Manhattan, New York. Hamilton's son, John C. Hamilton, commissioned Conrads to sculpt this statue, which was dedicated on November 22, 1880, and donated to the city. Conrads used the bust of Hamilton created by the sculptor Giuseppe Ceracchi as a model for Hamilton's head.

American founding father Alexander Hamilton lived nearby in Manhattan, at Hamilton Grange, when he died in 1804.

== Description ==
Hamilton is dressed in Colonial style with a wig, ruffled collar, knickers, and buckle shoes. His right hand is on his chest, while his left hand is holding a rolled document, resting on a stone column. Thirteen stars encircle the top of the pedestal. A sword, scabbard and military hat are near the base of the pedestal.

Conrads, working for New England Granite Works owned by James G. Batterson, used a block of Westerly granite since it was both beautiful and durable, able to withstand the highest pressures.

== Dedication ==
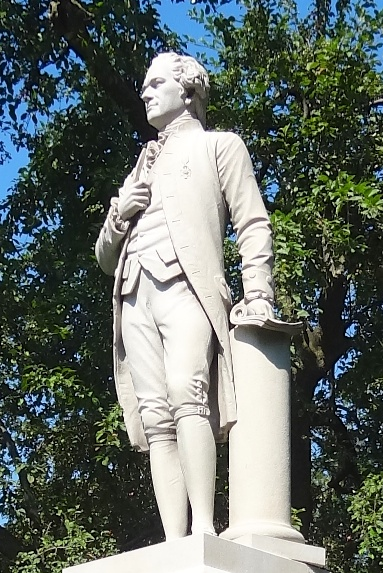
Statue view showing left hand, document, and column

The dedication, held on November 22, 1880, a cold and windy day, was attended by nearly 500 people. Hamilton's son, John C. Hamilton, made a brief speech to the crowd and guests, including members of the Society of the Cincinnati. Hamilton described the statue:

Upon a base of granite rock, with a tracing of forest trees marking its central position, and facing the rising sun, is beheld the statue of my father. With reverence for his character, and valuing the sympathies of this distinguished assemblage, I present it to this great Metropolis through your Honor, its esteemed Mayor.

The Mayor, Edward Cooper, then made a brief address praising Alexander and thanking John C. for his donation.

Fitting is it, my fellow-countrymen, that the statue of our illustrious townsman should stand in the chief resort of the City he adopted for his home.

Since the weather was so bad, the outdoor ceremony was moved inside the Metropolitan Museum of Art where later speakers included Alexander Hamilton Bullock and Chauncey M. Depew. Depew's speech covered Hamilton as a soldier, financier and statesman.

== Inscription ==
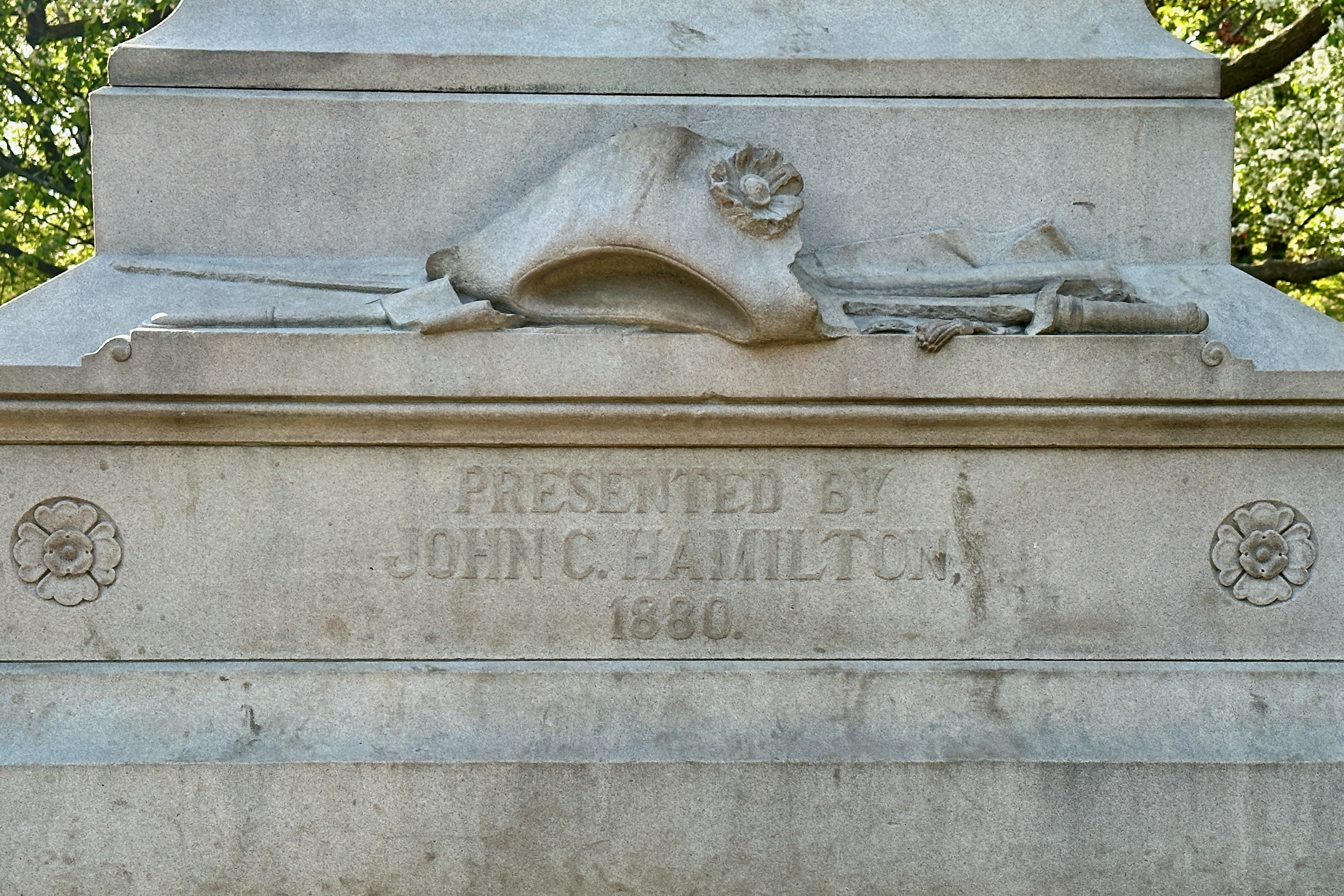
Pedestal base, with sword, scabbard and military hat

On the base of the pedestal:

PRESENTED BY
JOHN C. HAMILTON,
1880.

On the left side:

C. Conrads
N.E. Granite Works
Hartford, CT

== Legacy ==
While Ceracchi, born on July 4, 1751, created busts for several founding fathers, his life did not end well. After returning to Europe, he first celebrated Napoleon with a bust, but then turned against him. After an unsuccessful plot, Napoleon had him guillotined at the Place de Grève on January 30, 1801.
