= Carl Conrads =

American sculptor (1839–1920)

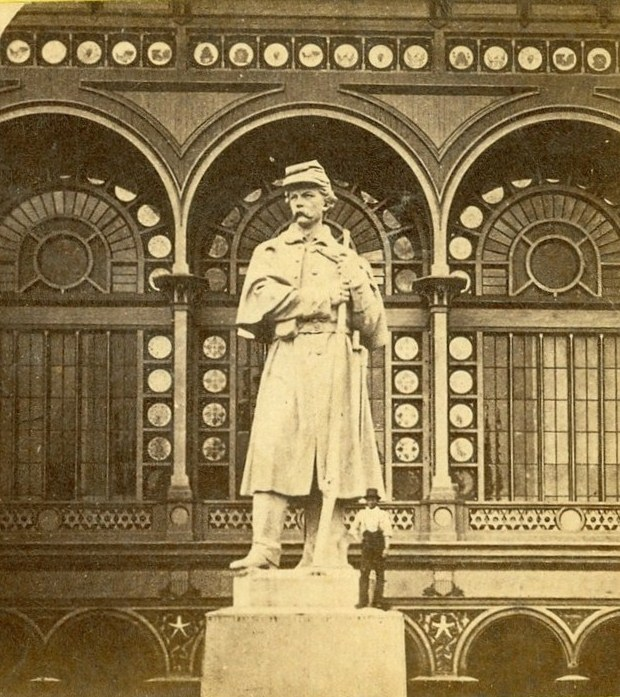
The American Volunteer, at the 1876 Centennial Exposition. Installed at Antietam National Cemetery in 1880.

Carl H. Conrads (February 26, 1839 in Breisig, Germany – May 24, 1920 in Hartford, Connecticut) was an American sculptor best known for his work on Civil War monuments and his two works in the National Statuary Hall Collection at the U.S. Capitol in Washington, D.C. He was also known as Charles Conrads.

== Biography ==
He was born in Sinzig-on-the-Rhine, the son of Heinrich Joseph Conrads and Johanna Maria Catherina Fleischer. His father was mayor of their town until removed from office by the Prussians in 1850. In 1853 his parents and brother Robert emigrated to Texas, where they became farmers and furnituremakers. Carl remained in Munich and received a diploma from the Koeniglich Bayerische Akademie der Bildenden Kunste. He emigrated to New York in 1860, and served as an artilleryman in the 20th New York Volunteers during the American Civil War. He moved to Hartford, Connecticut in 1866 to work for James G. Batterson at the New England Granite Works, where he worked until 1903.

A reference from 1879:

Another German artist, Carl Conrads, has been for twelve years connected with the Hartford Granite Company [sic]. He is perhaps over-modest regarding his work as a sculptor, which is surely very good of its kind. Among his best designs are the figures on the Antietam Monument. In 1871 he returned to Munich for a short visit, availing himself of the opportunity for still further study. As a designer of monuments, his work stands high.

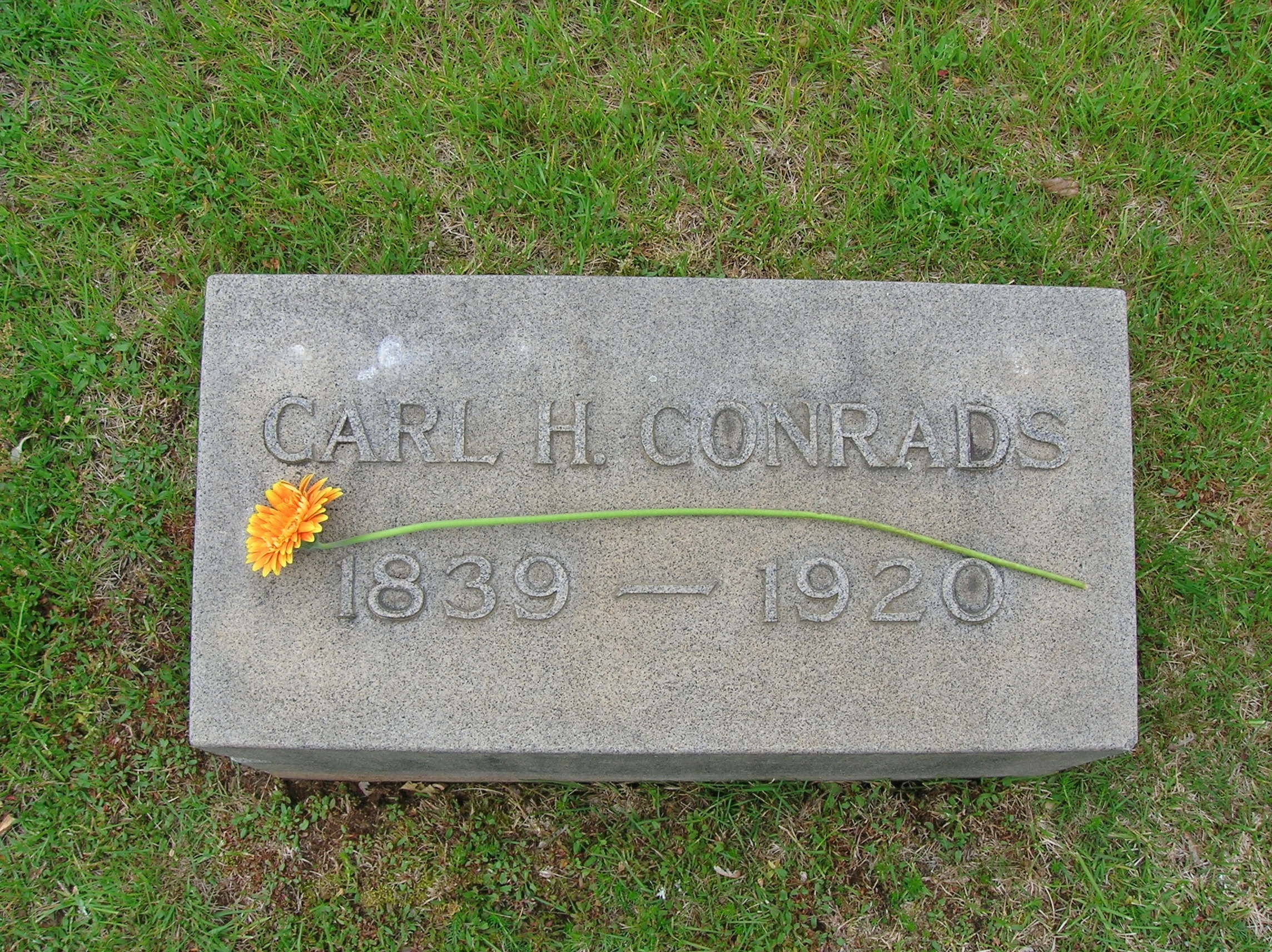

Sculptor and sculpture historian Lorado Taft said of him: "a German of good training, has identified himself with sculpture in granite, and has done much creditable work well adapted to the requirements of that ungrateful material."

Noteworthy among his granite works are his colossal American Volunteer statue at Antietam National Cemetery in Sharpsburg, Maryland; his seated figure of Morality on the National Monument to the Forefathers in Plymouth, Massachusetts – "said to be the largest solid granite monument in the world;" and his Alexander Hamilton statue in Central Park, New York City.

Conrads is buried in West Hartford, Connecticut; his grave is marked with a simple stone.

== Selected works ==
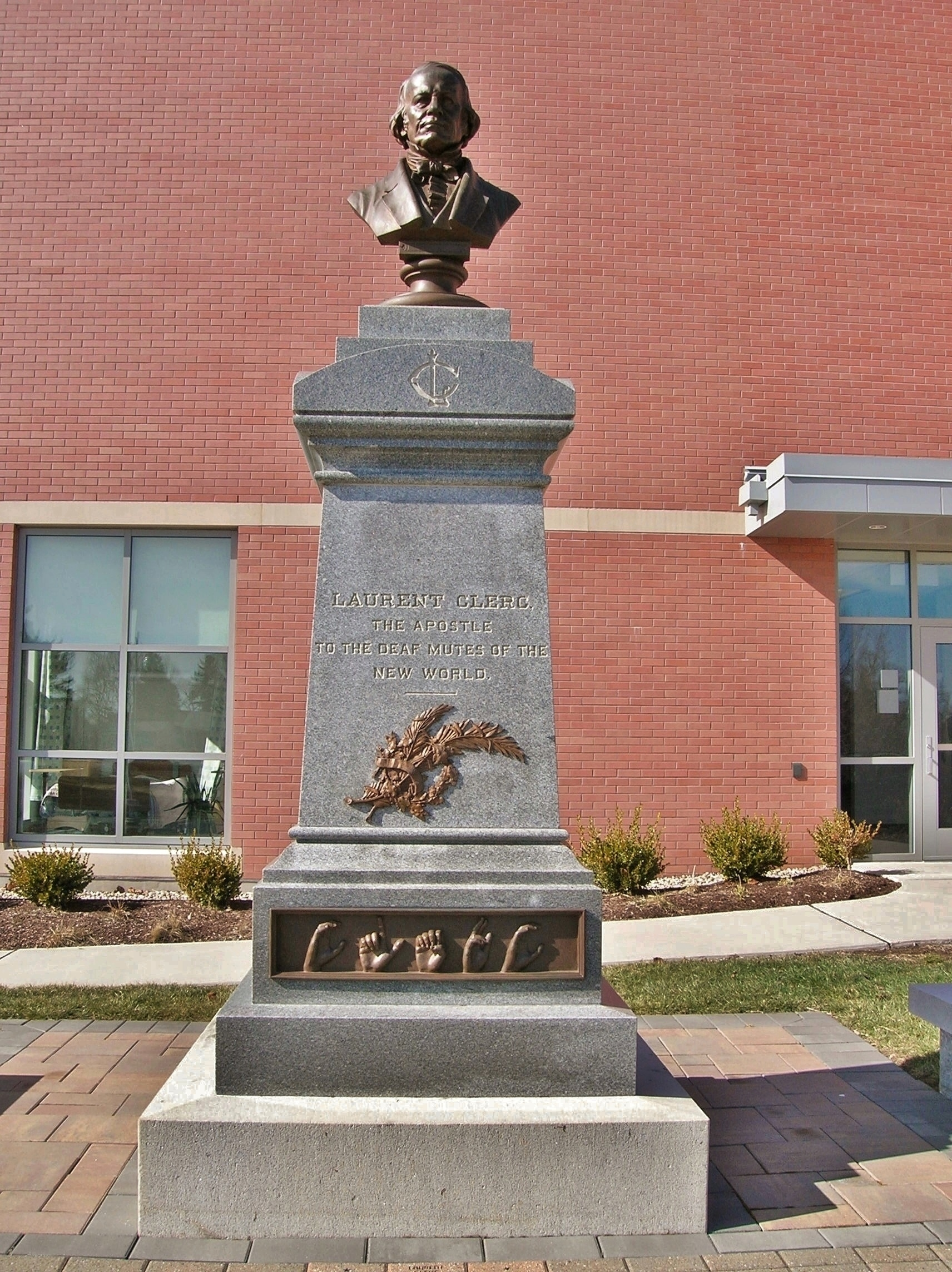
Bust of Laurent Clerc, American School for the Deaf, West Hartford, Connecticut (1874)

- Oswin Welles Memorial, bronze figure, Cedar Hill Cemetery, Hartford, Connecticut, 1873.
- Bust of Laurent Clerc, American School for the Deaf, West Hartford, Connecticut, 1874. The pedestal features a frieze of Clerc's name spelled in sign language.
- Moorhead Column, Allegheny Cemetery, Pittsburgh, Pennsylvania, 1877.
- Alexander Hamilton, Central Park, New York City, 1880. Conrads's plaster model for this is at the Museum of American Finance in New York City.
- Joel Thayer Monument, granite, Lake View Cemetery, Skaneateles, New York, 1882–83, George Keller, architect.
- Colonel Sylvanus Thayer Monument ("Father of the Military Academy"), U.S. Military Academy, West Point, New York, 1883.
- Relief bust of Noah Webster, Connecticut State Capitol, Hartford, Connecticut, 1885.
- Relief bust of Reverend Horace Bushnell, Connecticut State Capitol, Hartford, Connecticut, circa 1885.
- General Henry W. Halleck, Golden Gate Park, San Francisco, California, 1886.
- National Monument to the Forefathers, Plymouth, Massachusetts, 1889. With sculptors William Rimmer, John D. Perry (attributed), Alexander Doyle and James H. Mahoney; and architects Hammatt Billings and Joseph Edward Billings.
  - Morality (seated figure), granite.
  - Embarkation at Delft Haven (bas-relief plaque), marble.
- General John Stark, bronze, New Hampshire Statehouse, Concord, New Hampshire, 1890, John A. Fox, architect.
- John B. Ford, bronze, Third Street Park, Ford City, Pennsylvania, 1891.
- John Stark from New Hampshire, marble, National Statuary Hall Collection, United States Capitol, Washington D.C., 1894. Currently residing in the United States Capitol crypt.
- Daniel Webster from New Hampshire (after Thomas Ball), marble, National Statuary Hall Collection, United States Capitol, Washington D.C., 1894.
- Samuel J. Tilden Monument, Cemetery of the Evergreens, New Lebanon, New York, 1895, Ernest Flagg, architect.
- The Archangel Gabriel, marble, George H. Thacher Monument, St. Agnes Cemetery, Menands, New York, 1896.
- Minute Man, granite, Union Square, Elizabeth, New Jersey, 1905.
- Relief bust of Henry Keney, Keney Park Entrance Gates, Hartford, Connecticut, circa 1905.
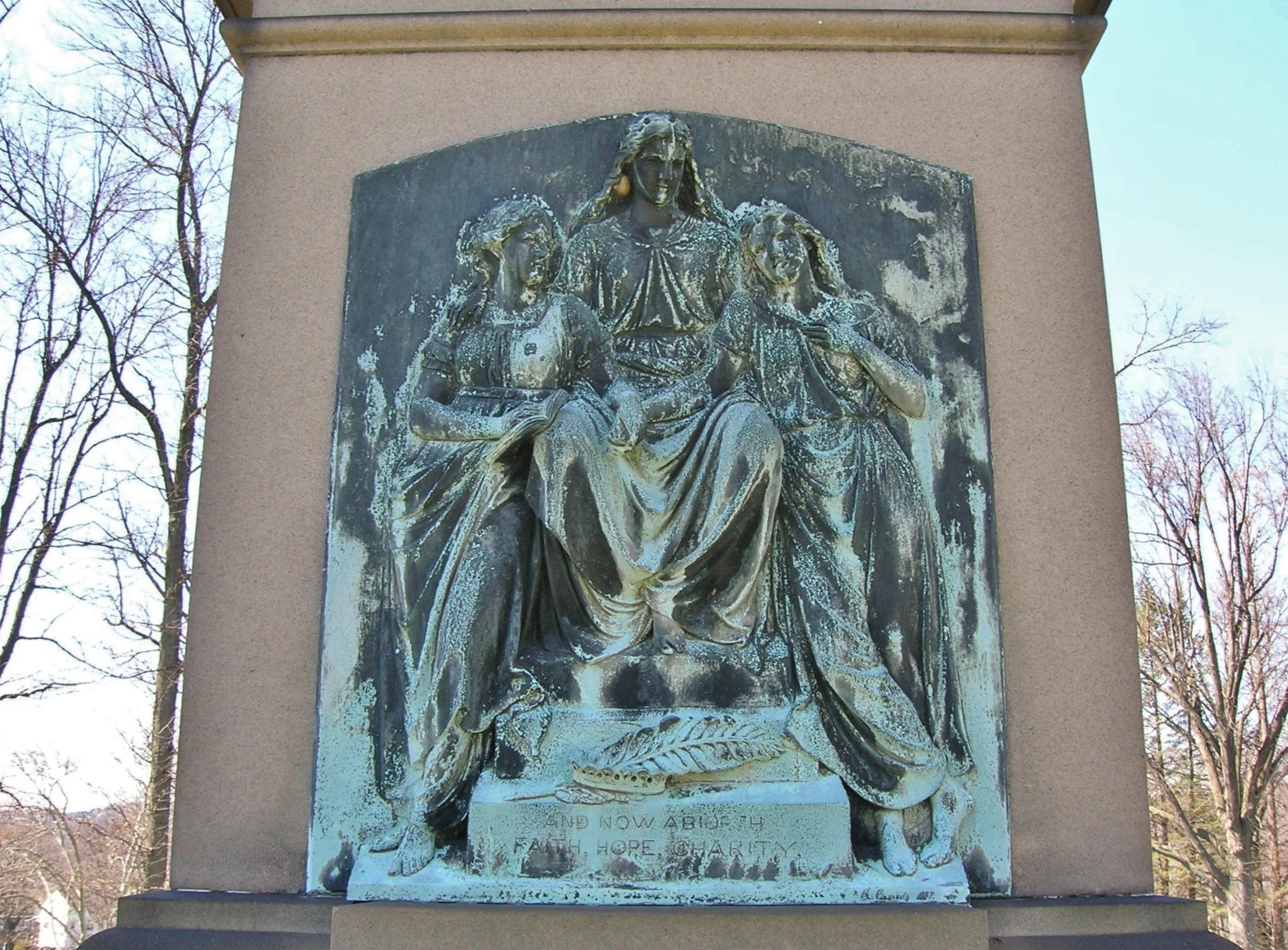
Faith, Hope and Charity on Moorhead Column, Allegheny Cemetery, Pittsburgh, Pennsylvania (1877).

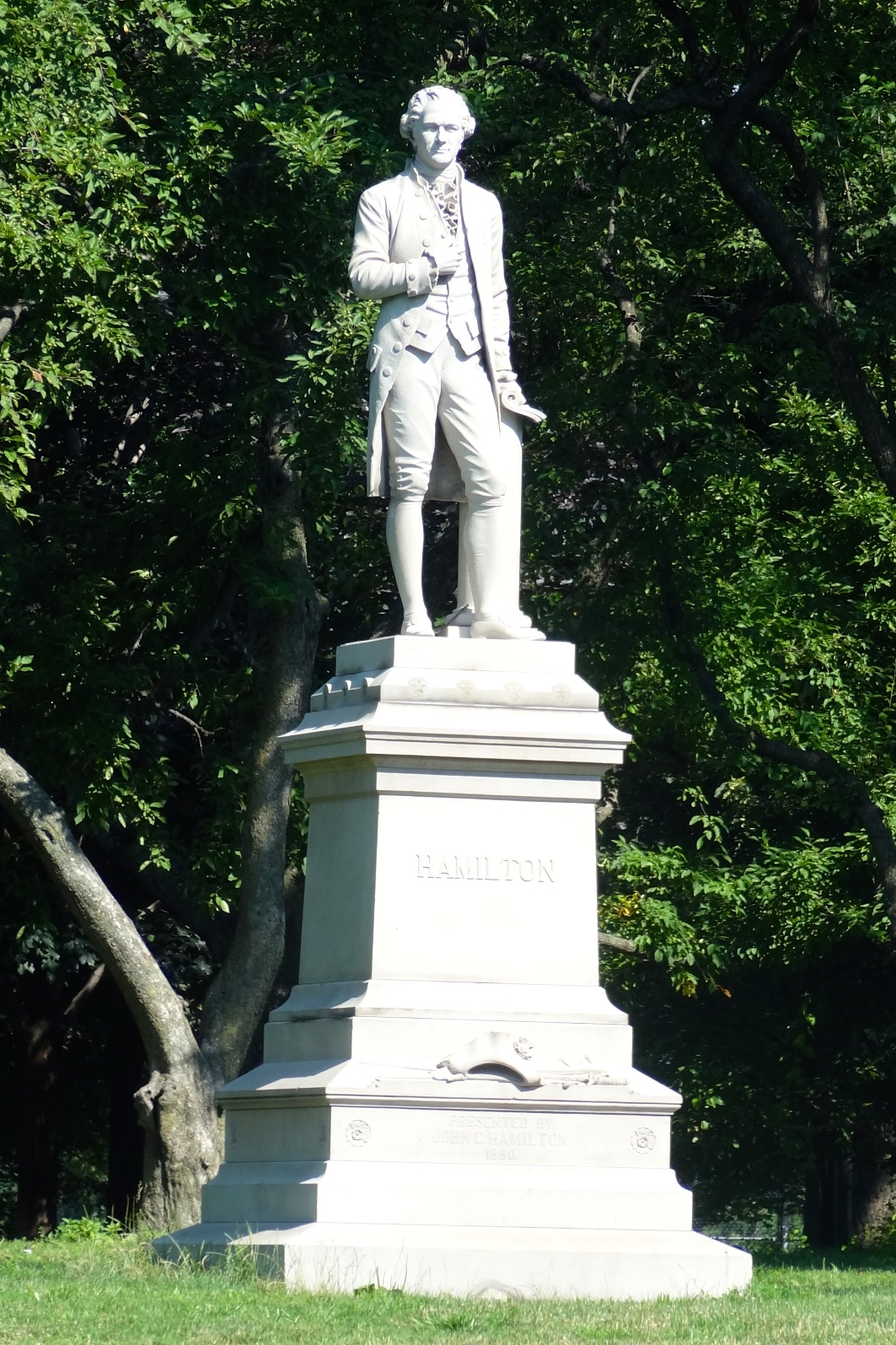
Alexander Hamilton, Central Park, New York City (1880).

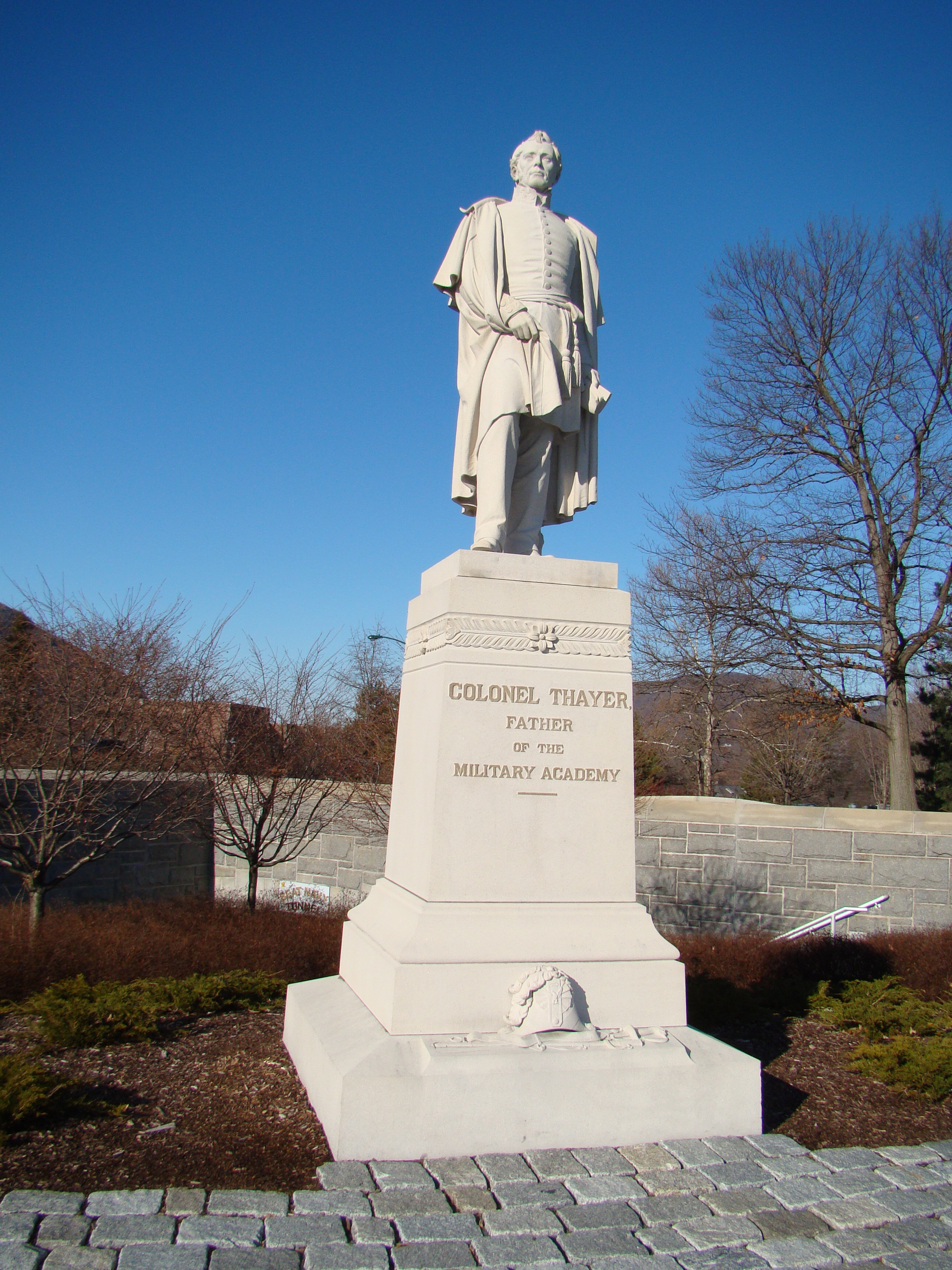
Thayer Monument, U.S. Military Academy, West Point, New York (1883).

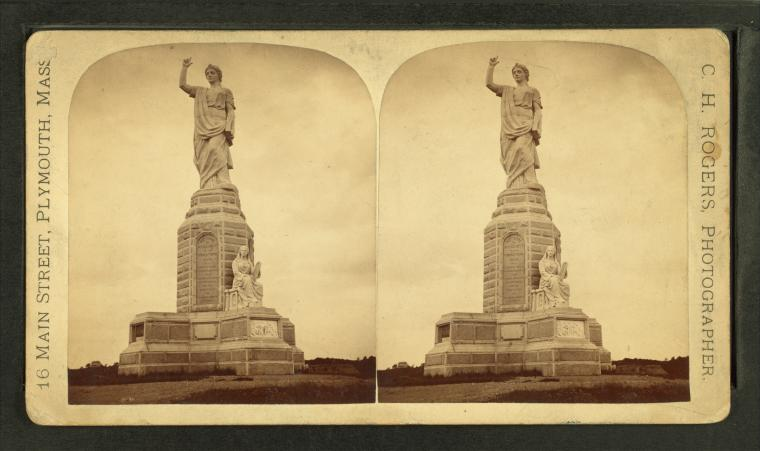
Circa 1888 view of unfinished National Monument to the Forefathers, showing Conrads's Morality seated figure and his Embarkation plaque below it.

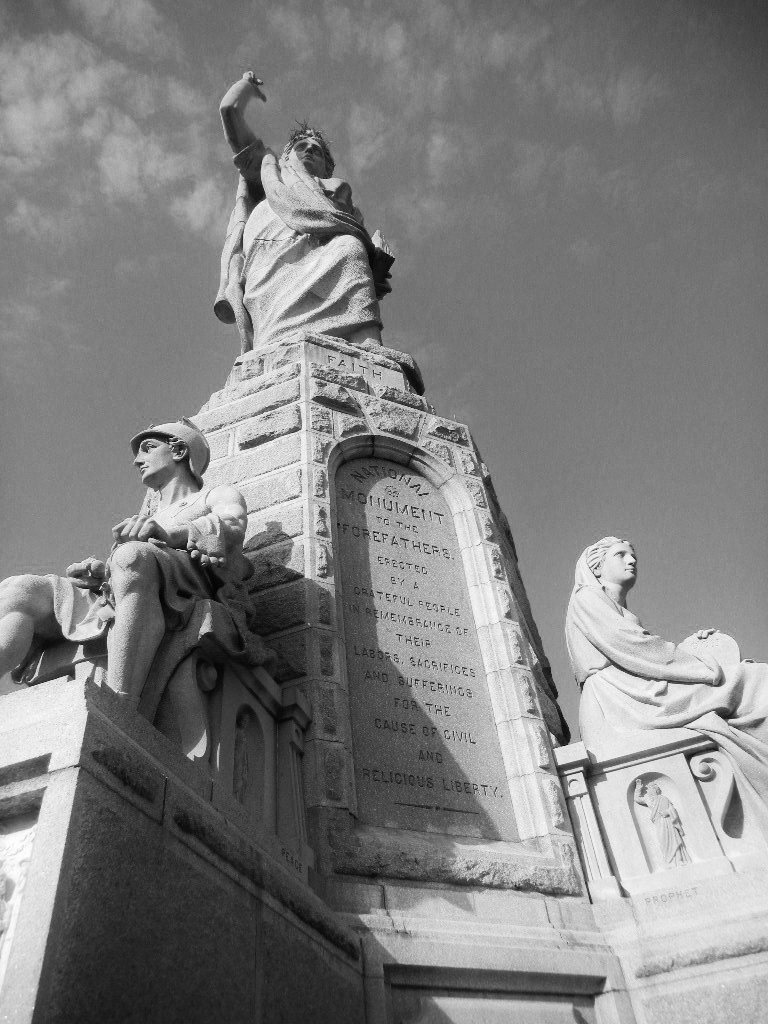
Morality (right), National Monument to the Forefathers, Plymouth, Massachusetts (1888).

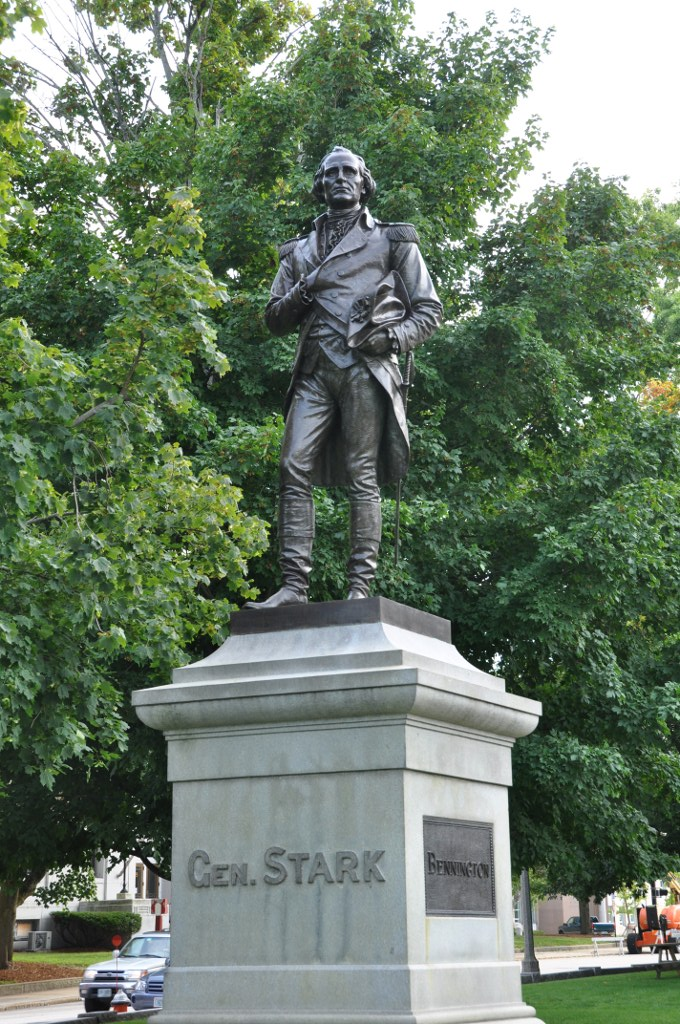
General John Stark, New Hampshire State Capitol, Concord (1890).

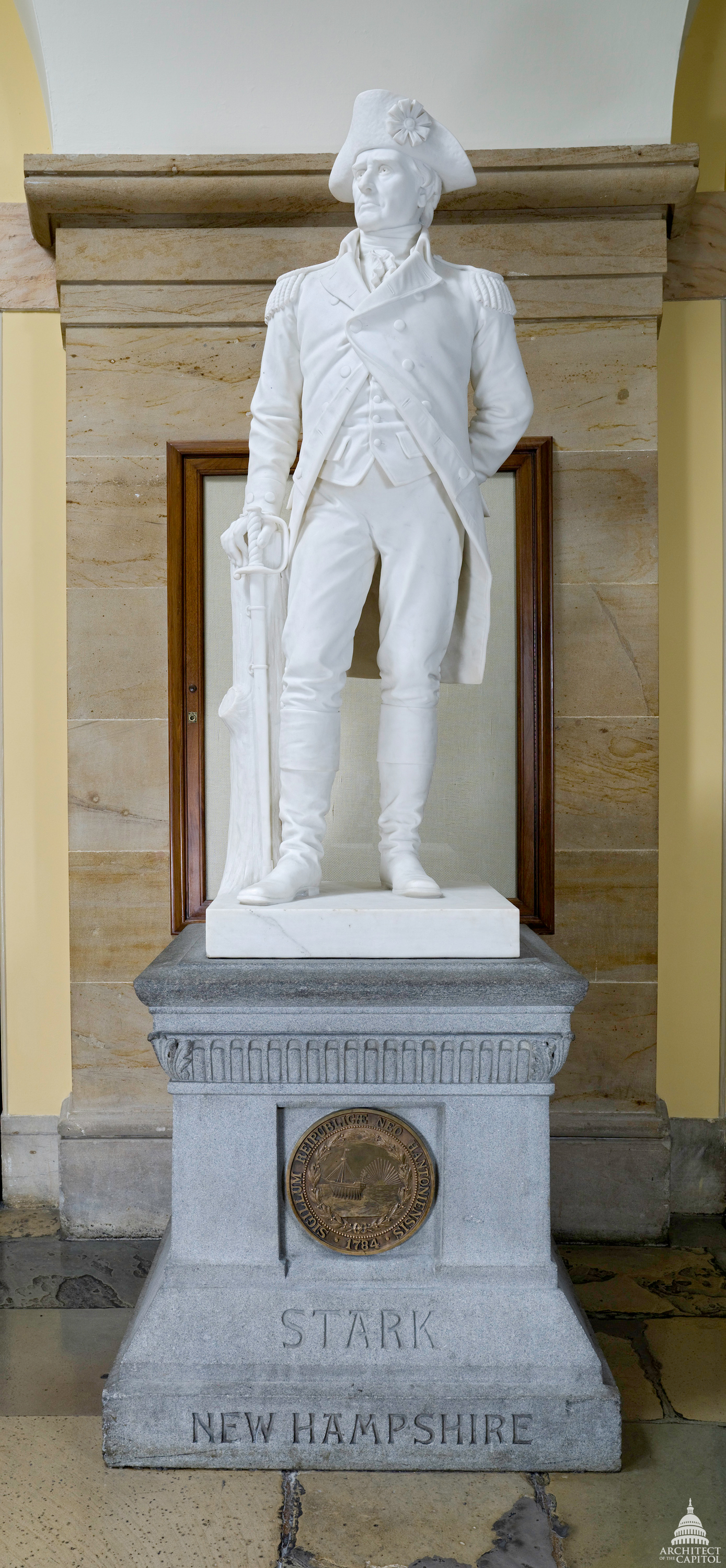
John Stark, United States Capitol, Washington, D.C. (1894).

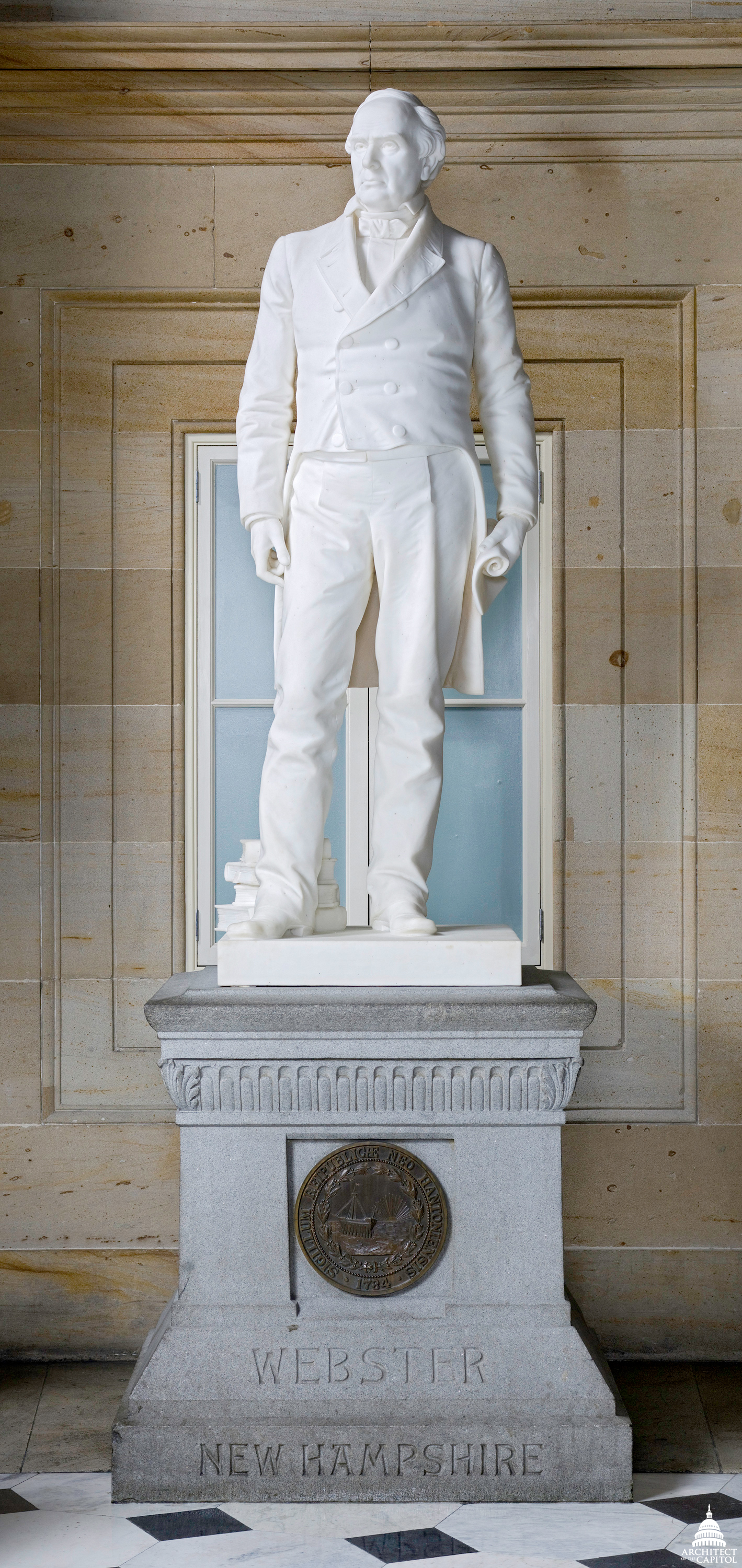
Daniel Webster, United States Capitol, Washington, D.C. (1894).

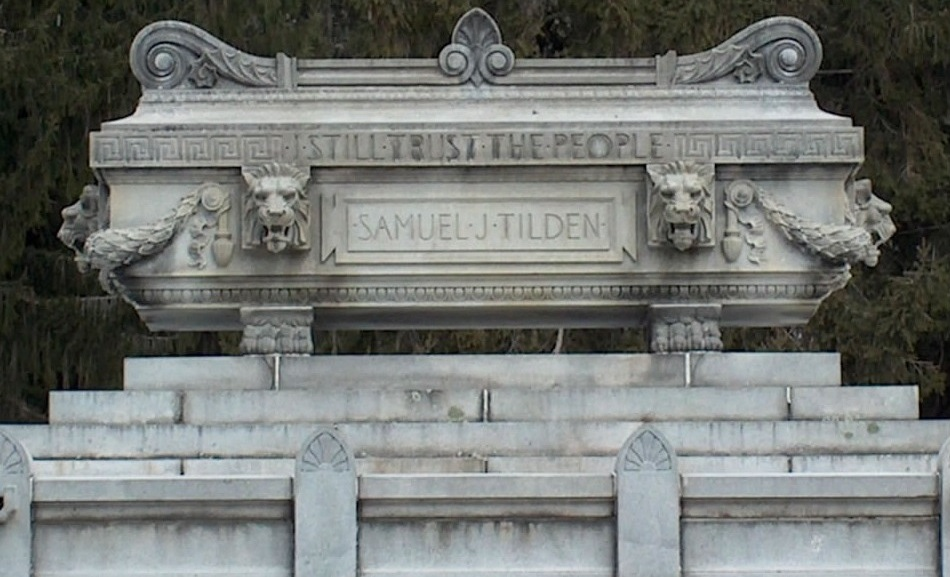
Samuel J. Tilden Monument, Cemetery of the Evergreens, New Lebanon, New York, (1895).

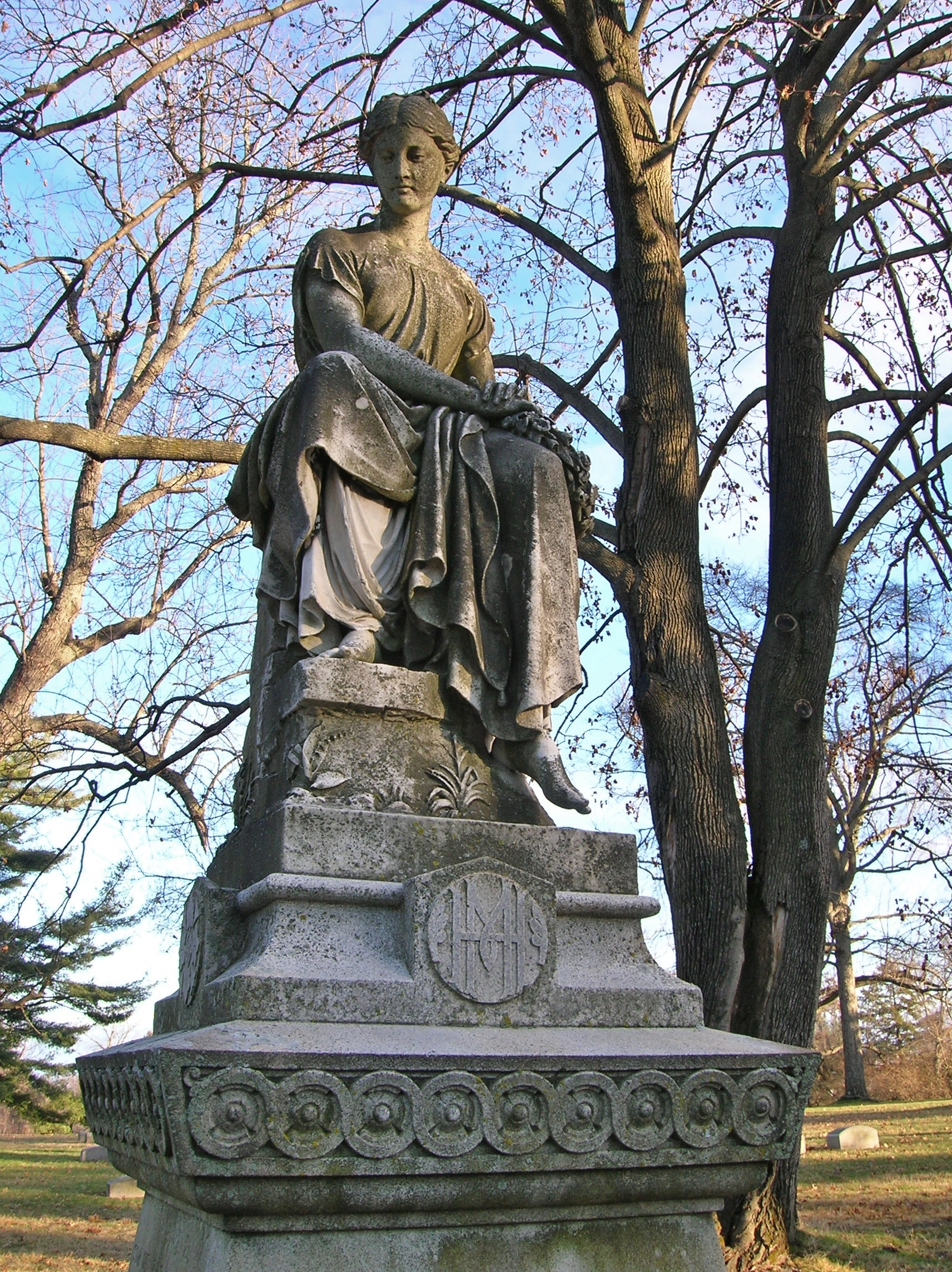
Hunt family monument, Cedar Hill Cemetery, Hartford, CT.

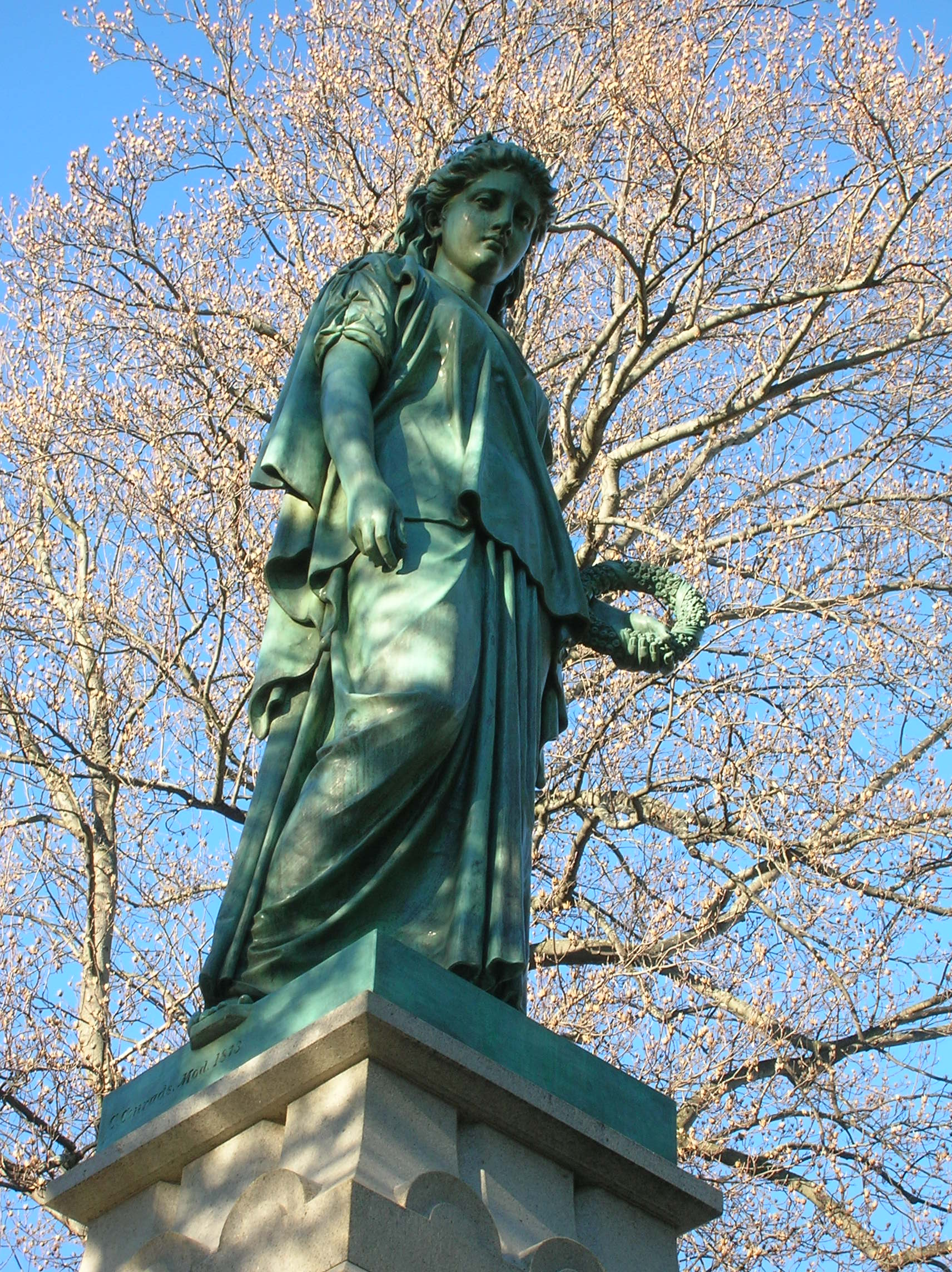
Statue atop Oswin Welles family monument, Cedar Hill Cemetery, Hartford, CT, (1873).

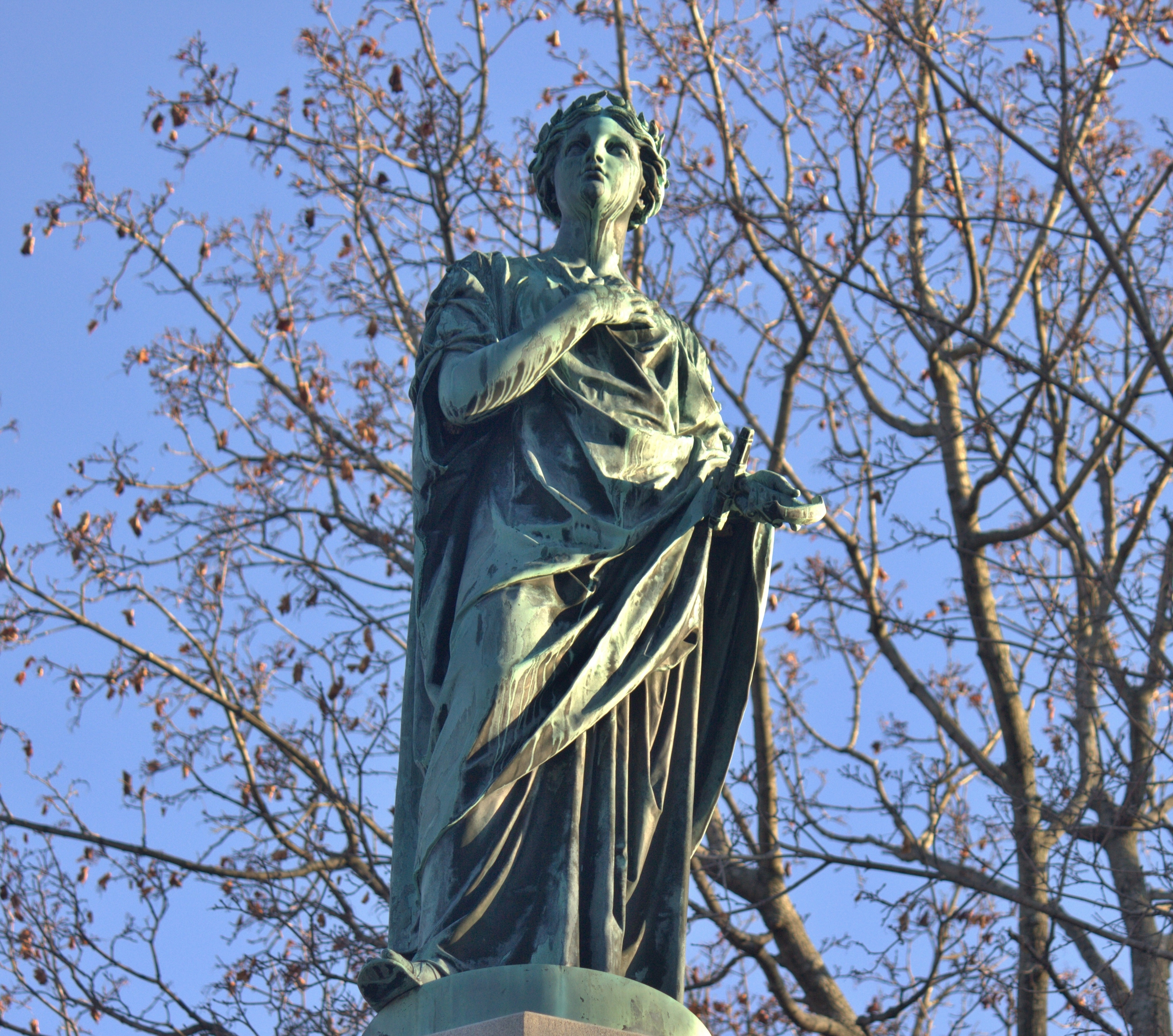
Statue atop Marshall Jewell monument, Cedar Hill Cemetery, Hartford, CT.

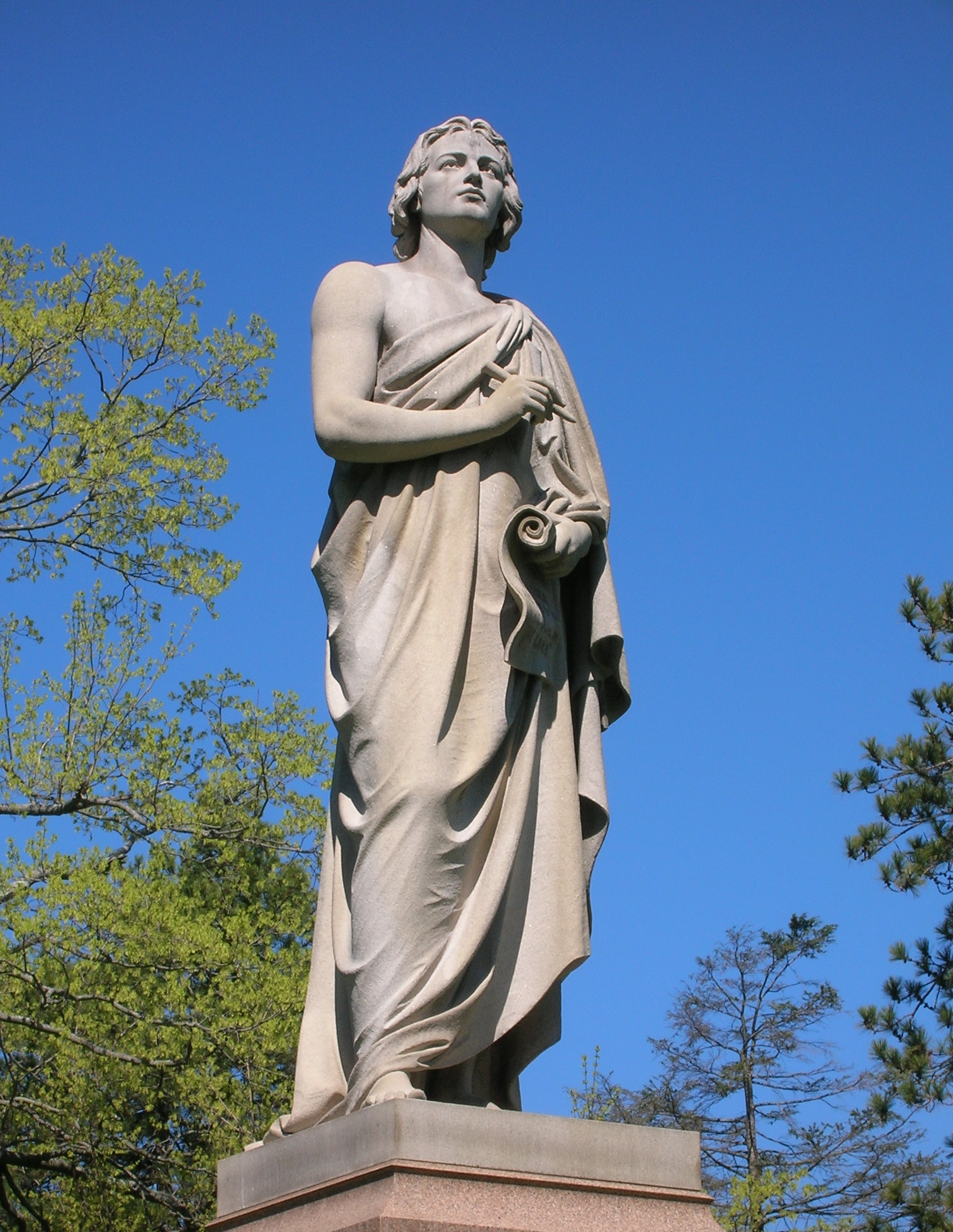
Statue atop John B. Windsor monument, Cedar Hill Cemetery, Hartford, CT (circa 1887-1905).

=== Civil War monuments ===
Title	Image	Year	Location/GPS Coordinates	Material	Dimensions	Notes
Soldiers' Monument		1868	Granby Green, 3 East Granby Road, Granby, Connecticut; 41.9536°N 72.7891°W	Brownstone	Statue: Monument: approx. 21 ft (6.4 m)	George Keller, architect Part of Granby Center Historic District.
Forlorn Soldier Statue		1866-1869	Connecticut State Capitol, Hartford	Brownstone from quarry in Portland, CT	Statue: Monument:	Contractor: Batterson's Monumental Works; Sculptor: Charles Conrads
Knight Hospital Monument		1870	Evergreen Cemetery, 92 Winthrop Avenue, New Haven, Connecticut; 41.3032°N 72.9453°W	Granite	Statue: Monument: approx. 26 ft (7.92 m)	Dedicated to the 204 Union soldiers who died while in the hospital's care.
Soldiers' Monument		1872	Main & Bartlett Streets, Portland, Connecticut; 41.5908°N 72.6244°W	Brownstone	Statue: Monument: 33 ft (10.06 m)	
Soldiers' Monument		1873	Meriden City Hall, East Main & Catlin Streets, Meriden, Connecticut; 41.5364°N 72.7977°W	Granite	Statue: 7 ft (2.13 m); Monument: approx. 45 ft (13.72 m)	
The Soldiers' Monument		1875	Chelsea Parade Green, Washington & Williams Streets, Norwich, Connecticut; 41.5369°N 72.0836°W	Granite	Statue: 12 ft (3.66 m); Monument: 27 ft 6 in (8.38 m)	Octagonal pedestal.
The American Volunteer (statue), U.S. Soldier Monument		1876; Dedicated 1880	Antietam National Cemetery, Sharpsburg, Maryland; 39.4592°N 77.7411°W	Granite	Statue: 21 ft 6 in (6.55 m); Monument: 44 ft 7 in (13.59 m)	Conrads, sculptor; James W. Pollette, carver; George Keller, architect. The American Volunteer was exhibited at the 1876 Centennial Exposition.
Soldiers Monument		1876	Courthouse Park, Cortland County Courthouse, Cortland, New York; 42.5994°N 76.1776°W	Bronze statue Granite pedestal		"Centennial Offering of Cortland County in Memory of Those Who Fought in Defence of the Union 1861. 1865. - A. D. 1876."; Signed: C. Conrads.
Soldiers' Monument		1876; Dedicated 1877	Center Park, Main & Center Streets, Manchester, Connecticut; 41.7753°N 72.5221°W	Bronze statue Granite pedestal	Statue: Monument: approx. 15 ft 6 in (4.72 m)	Signed C. Conrads 1876; Geo.Fischer & Bro. Bronze Foundry. N.Y. At base of granite monument: "In memory of the soldiers of Manchester who died in the War of the Rebellion 1861 - 1865"
Wolcottville Soldier's Monument		1879	Coe Memorial Park, South Main & Litchfield Streets, Torrington, Connecticut; 41.7997°N 73.1216°W	Tan granite	Statue: Monument: 16 ft (4.88 m)	The statue is one-third-size copy of The American Volunteer. Cylindrical pedestal (unusual). : Made by the New England Granite Works
Soldiers' Monument		1880	Town Green, Main & Academy Streets, Southington, Connecticut; 41.6011°N 72.8783°W	"White" granite Blue granite columns	Statue: Monument: 20 ft (6.1 m)	
Soldiers' Monument		1883	East Main Street & Broadway Avenue; Mystic in Stonington, Connecticut; 41.3529°N 71.9641°W	Tan granite	Statue: Monument: approx. 19 ft (5.8 m)	Part of Mystic Bridge Historic District.
Soldiers and Sailors Monument		1883	Geneva & Haverling Streets, Bath, New York; 42.3400°N 77.3174°W	Bronze statue		Originally a fountain statue at New York State Soldiers' and Sailors' Home, Bath. "Manchester" model.
Soldiers' and Sailors' Monument		1902	Taunton Green, Taunton, Massachusetts; 41.9020°N 71.0932°W	Granite	Statue: 8 ft (2.44 m); Monument: 22 ft (6.71 m)	
Soldiers' Monument (attributed work)		1912	93 Grove Street, Putnam, Connecticut; 41.9123°N 71.9029°W	Bronze statue Granite pedestal	Statue: Monument: approx. 19 ft (5.79 m)	
Civil War Monument (attributed work)		1915-16	Monument & Smith Streets opposite Fort Griswold State Park, Groton, Connecticut; 41.3549°N 72.0787°W	Granite	Statue: Monument: approx. 22 ft (6.71 m)	Donated by Robert A. Gray.
