= The American Volunteer (statue) =

- U.S. Soldier Monument, Private Soldier Monument
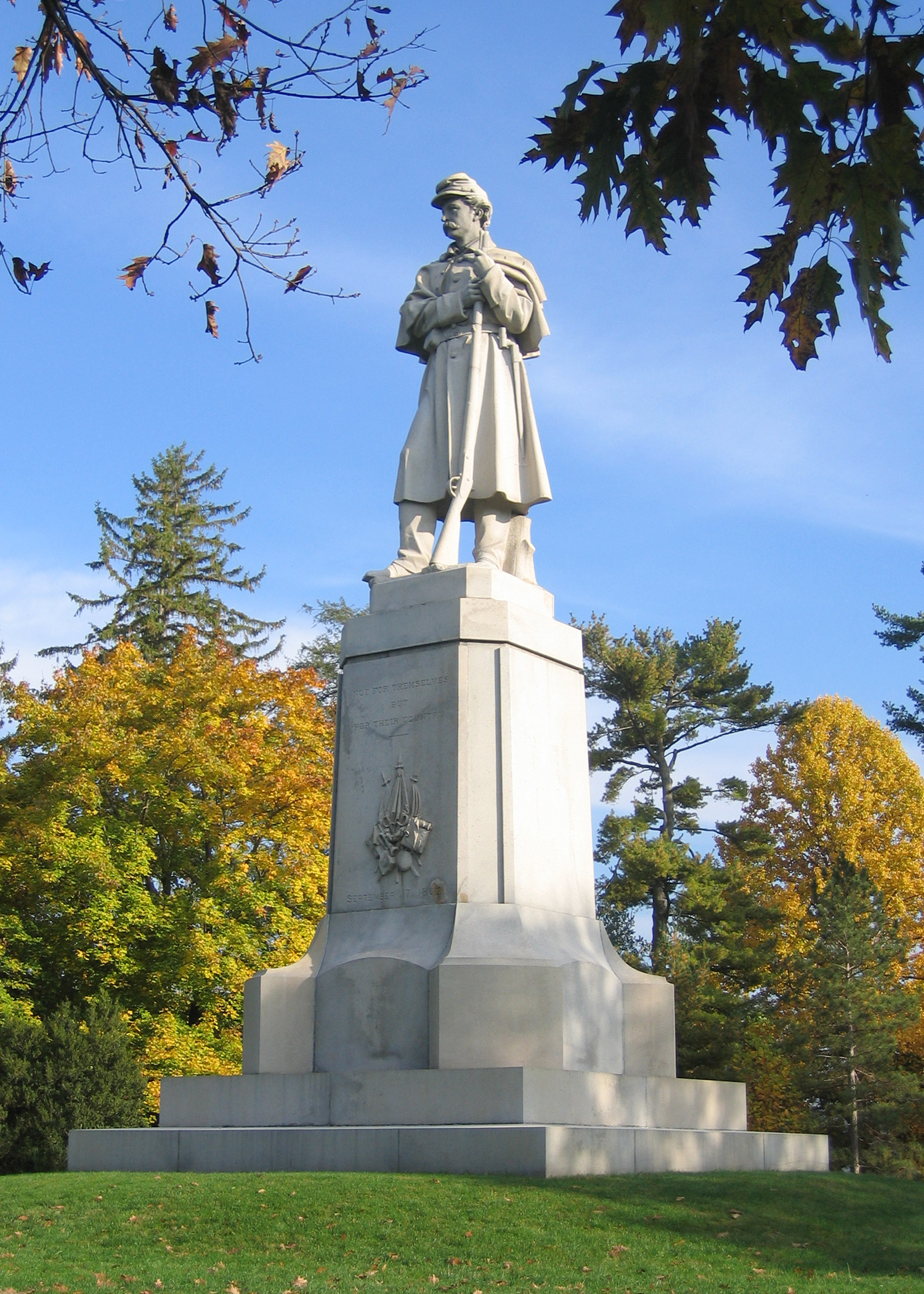
- Artist: Carl Conrads, sculptor George Keller, architect
- Year: completion 1876 dedication 1880
- Type: Granite
- Dimensions: Statue: 21 ft 6 in (6.55 m); Weight: 29 tons; Monument: 44 ft 7 in (13.59 m); Total weight: 250 tons
- Location: Antietam National Cemetery Sharpsburg, Maryland United States; 39°27′33″N 77°44′28″W
- Owner: National Park Service

The American Volunteer – also known as The American Soldier – is a colossal granite statue that crowns the U.S. Soldier Monument and forms the centerpiece of Antietam National Cemetery in Sharpsburg, Maryland. The monument is also known as the Private Soldier Monument.

The monument was designed by sculptor Carl Conrads and architect George Keller of the New England Granite Works of Hartford, Connecticut. The statue, described as "the largest work of its kind in the country", was prominently exhibited at the 1876 Centennial Exposition in Philadelphia, Pennsylvania. It was transported to Sharpsburg, installed atop the monument, and dedicated at the National Cemetery in 1880. The total cost of the monument was over US$32,000. The statue's nickname is "Old Simon".

== Planning ==
The monument's cornerstone was laid on September 17, 1867 – the fifth anniversary of the battle – as part of the dedication ceremonies for Antietam National Cemetery. President Andrew Johnson, the Justices of the U.S. Supreme Court, and members of the U.S. Senate and U.S. House of Representatives were in attendance, along with other dignitaries including General Grant, General McClellan, General Burnside, and Admiral Porter.

The night before, the Antietam National Cemetery Board approved the monument's design – a colossal U.S. soldier in overcoat, half-cape and kepi (cap) holding his rifle and standing at parade rest. "No record has come to hand of the design-selection process for Antietam. Whether the committee first stated what it wanted, and Batterson complied, or whether the architect, George Keller, and sculptor, Carl Conrads, of the Batterson firm originated a proposal is not known."

== Execution ==
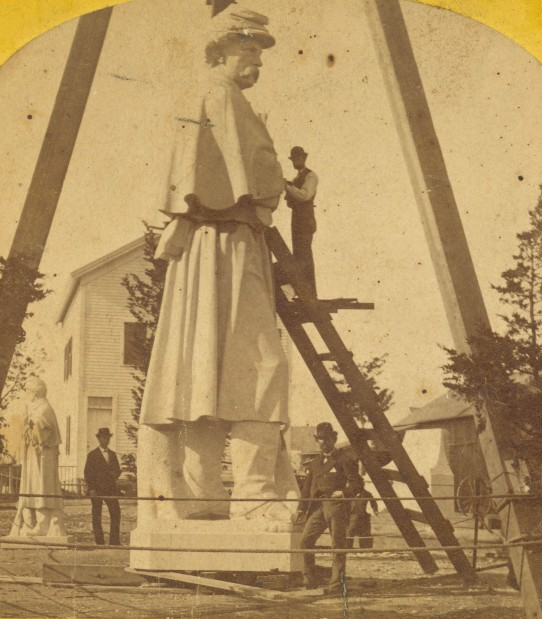
Statue at Westerly, Rhode Island, circa 1876. Note the smaller version, far left.

Granite for the statue was quarried at a subsidiary of the New England Granite Works – the Rhode Island Granite Works at Westerly, Rhode Island, where the statue was also carved. A team of stonecarvers, headed by James W. Pollette, completed the statue. The statue was created in two pieces, the soldier's belt hides the joint. A tree stump at the back of the figure adds stability.

The pose of the statue was unusual for its time. Rather than the formal pose of a soldier standing at attention, Conrads had his figure stand in the informal pose of parade rest. Sculptor Martin Milmore had posed a soldier at parade rest for his Roxbury Soldiers' Monument (1867) at Forest Hills Cemetery in Boston, Massachusetts, but there the soldier looks down in grief or introspection. Conrads's soldier is alert, and actively surveying the horizon. With the instantaneous popularity of The American Volunteer, the parade rest pose soon became common for Civil War monuments.

Conrads seems to have used the Antietam statue's model for the soldier figure atop the Portland, Connecticut Soldiers' Monument (1871–72). The Portland soldier stands in the same pose (and even has the same stump supporting its back). Conrads's 7-foot soldier atop the Meriden, Connecticut Soldiers' Monument (1873), also appears to be based on the Antietam model. According to a newspaper article at the time of its dedication, his statue atop the Wolcottville Soldier's Monument (1879) was based on the Antietam model.

Batterson allowed O. Langworthy & Company to photograph the colossal statue at the Rhode Island Granite Works prior to its departure by ship for Philadelphia, Pennsylvania. This may have been intended to generate publicity before its formal debut at the Centennial Exposition in May 1876.

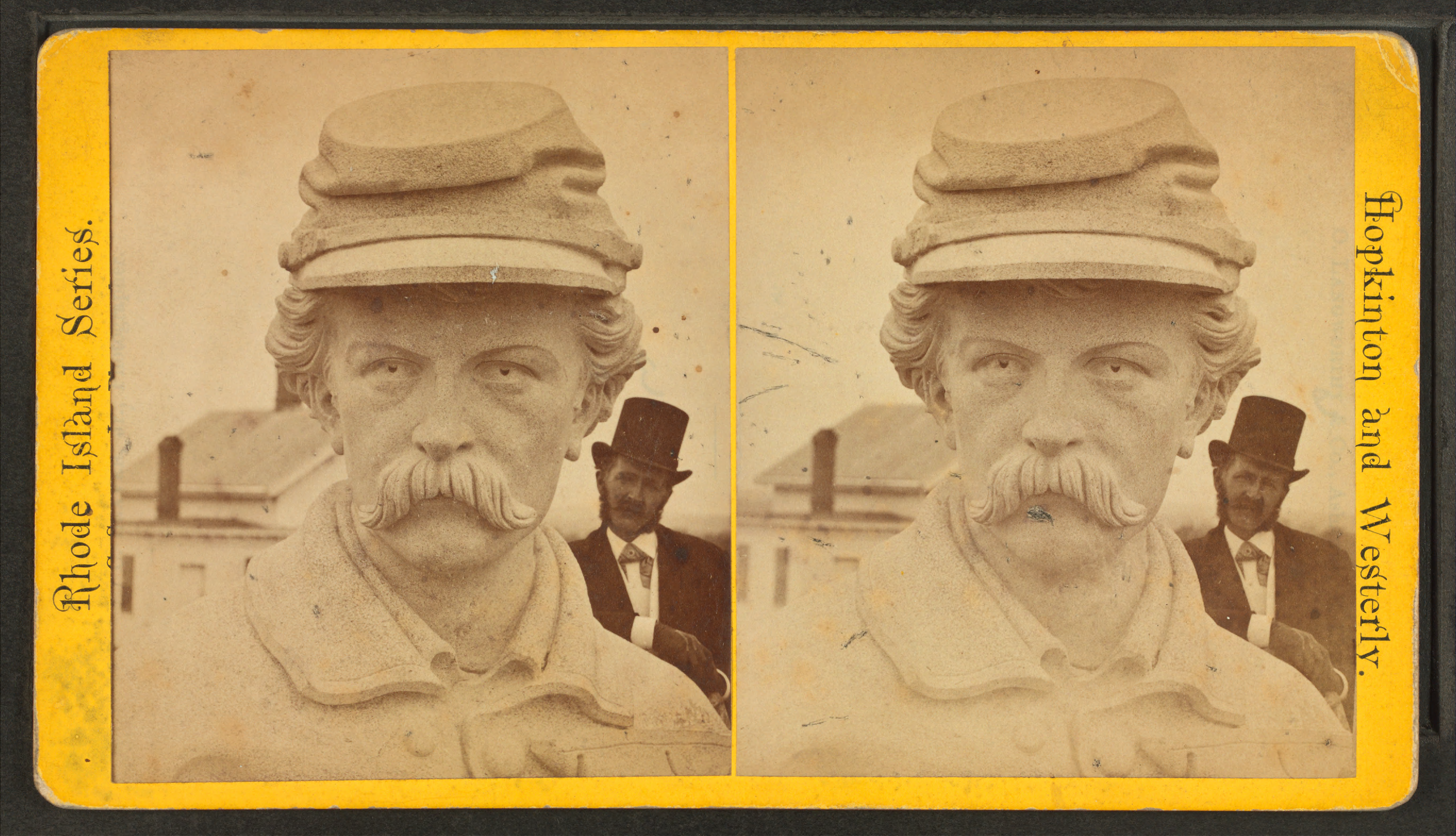

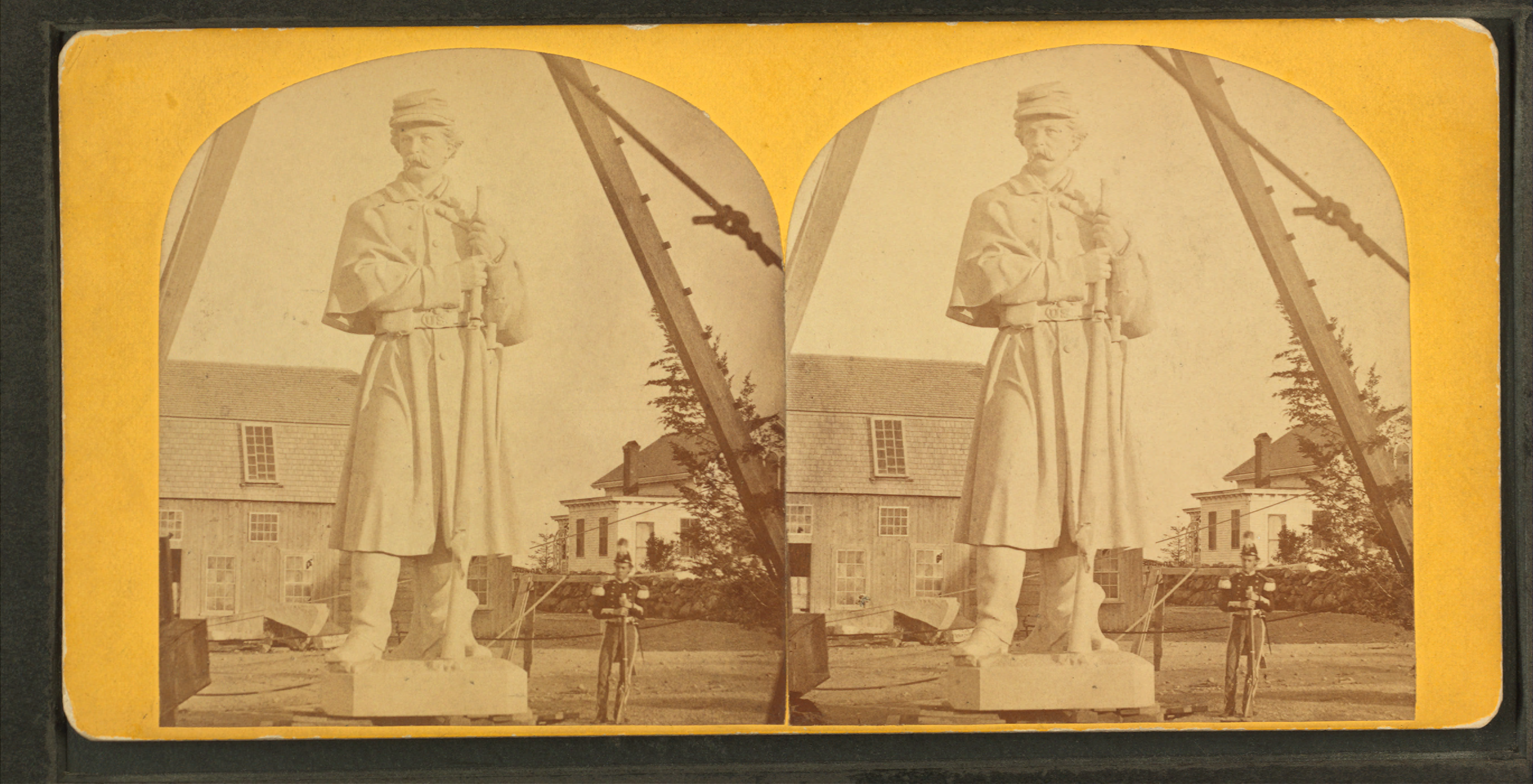

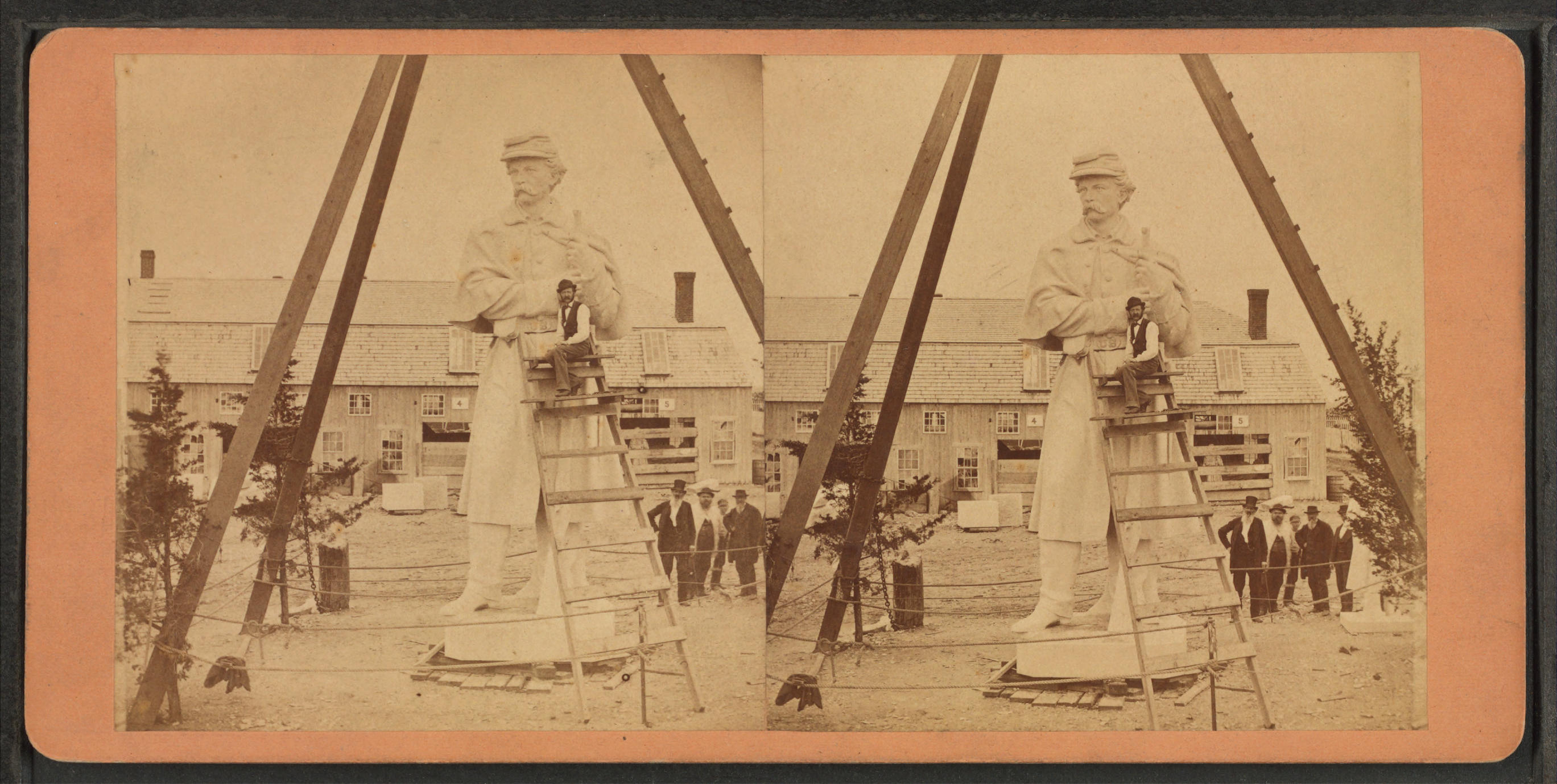

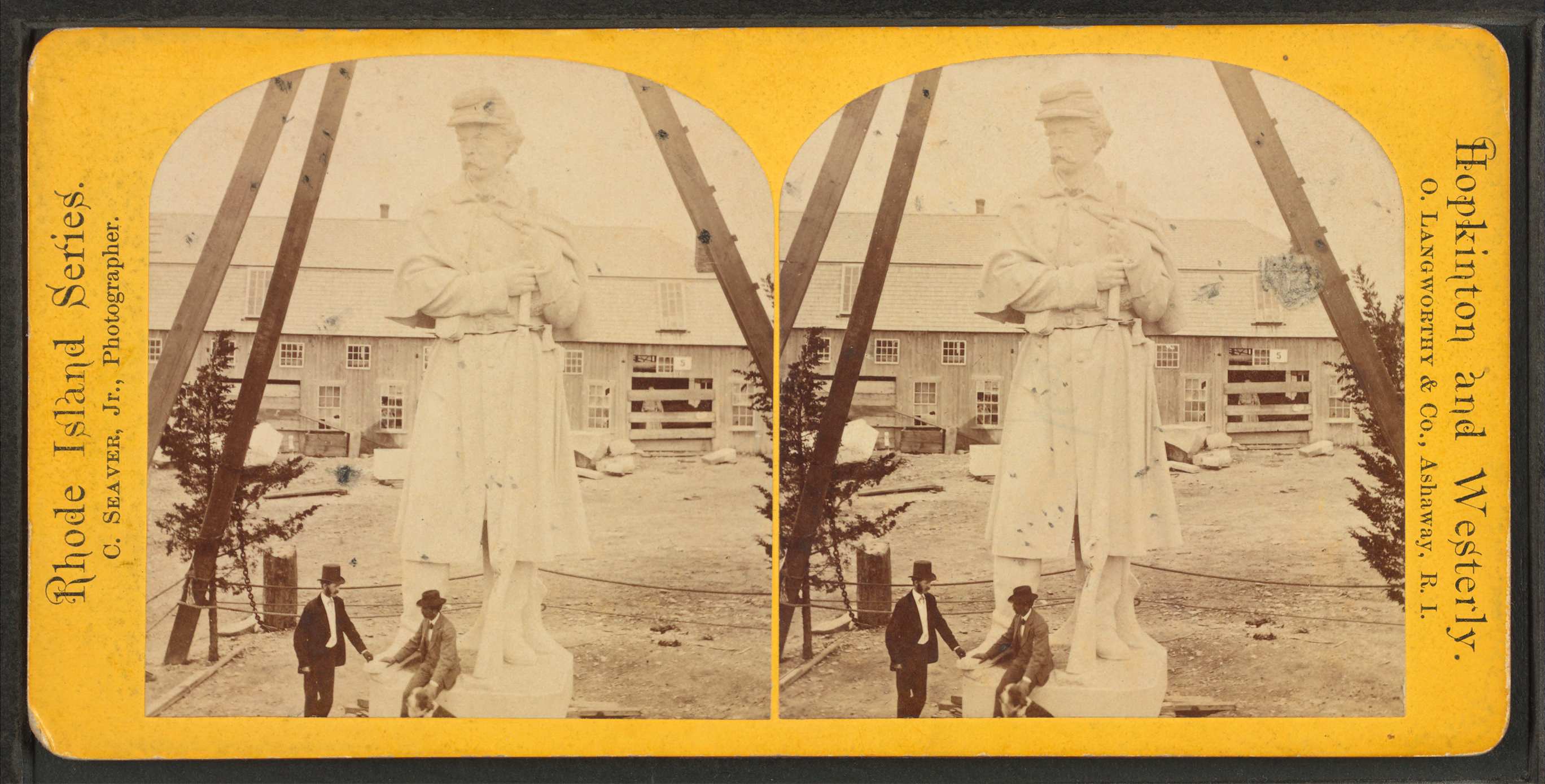

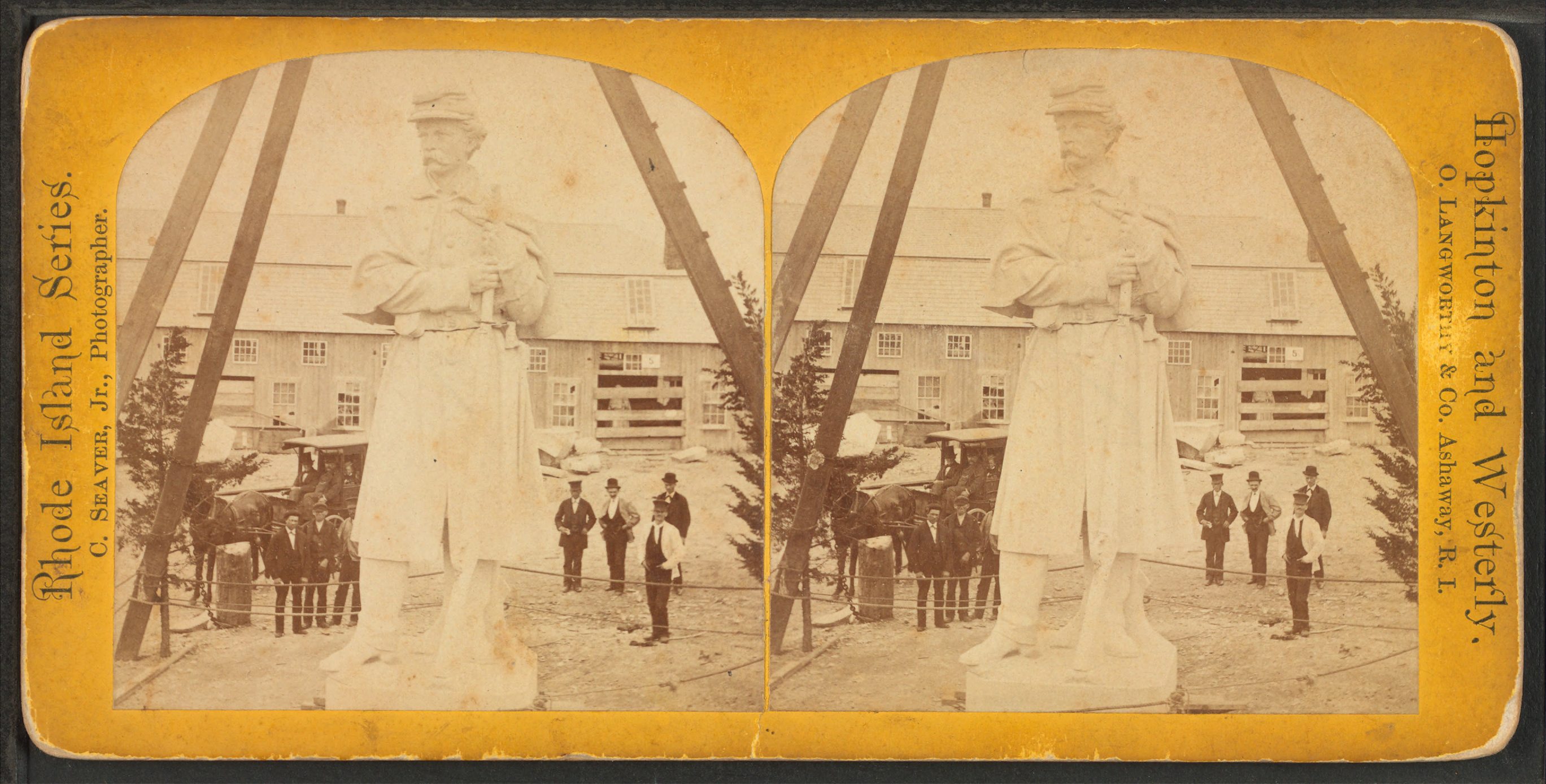

== Centennial Exposition ==
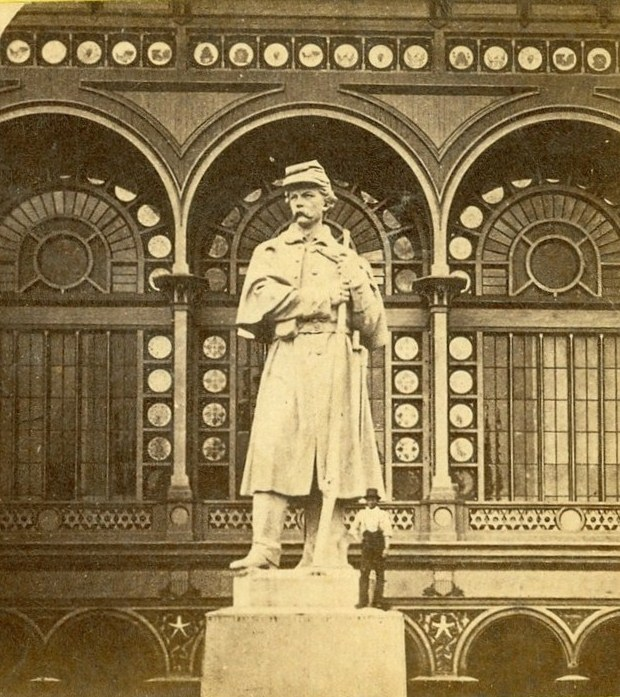
The American Volunteer, at the 1876 Centennial Exposition. Note the man standing beside it.

The statue probably arrived at the Centennial fairgrounds by railroad from the Schuylkill River docks, and in two pieces. The Pennsylvania Railroad had built numerous stub lines, first to deliver construction materials for the Exposition buildings, then to deliver their exhibits. The Main Exhibition Building was the largest building in the world by area, 1,876 feet (571.8 m) in length and enclosing 21.5 acres (8.7 ha).

The colossal statue was erected atop a 15-foot granite pedestal in front of the Main Exhibition Building's north entrance, in the middle of the main promenade, the Avenue of the Republic, and directly opposite the Art Gallery (now Memorial Hall). President Grant was facing the statue when he declared the first American World's Fair open on May 10, 1876.

More than 10 million people (one-fifth of the U.S. population) visited the Exposition, and nearly all of them would have seen the statue. Millions more experienced it through illustrations and photographs. Although its formal name was "The American Soldier", the statue soon became popularly known as "The American Volunteer". The widely distributed stereoscopic view (shown at right) used the caption "The American Volunteer", and may have been responsible for this renaming.

One critic's opinion:

What Mr. Conrads gives us in granite... [is] the ponderous "Antietam Soldier." Like the nation he defends, this colossus is in the bloom of youth, and like it he is hard and firm though alert. What art has succeeded in making this monster out of granite? He is twenty-one feet six inches in height. The sculptors of ancient Egypt, who had their colossi in granite also, worked for years with their bronze points and their corundum-dust to achieve their enormous figures, while the makers of this titanic image, availing themselves of the appliances of American skill, have needed but a few months to change the shapeless mass of stone into an idea. Something rocky, rude and large-grained is obvious in this stalwart American; his head, with masculine chin and moustache of barbaric proportions... But, whatever may be thought of the artistic delicacy of the model, Mr. Conrads' "Soldier" presents the image of a sentinel not to be trifled with, as he leans with both hands clasped around his gun-barrel, the cape of his overcoat thrown back to free his arm, and the sharp bayonet thrust into its sheath at his belt. Rabelais' hero, Pantagruel, whose opponents were giants in armor of granite, would have recoiled before our colossus of Antietam, because his heart is of granite too.

The forearm of the Statue of Liberty was an attraction at the 1876 Exposition, set up as an observation tower, with admission fees going toward funding continued work on it. The American Volunteer was arguably the more famous statue, at least until Frédéric Auguste Bartholdi completed "Lady Liberty" in Paris in 1884, and it was shipped to the United States in 1885.

== Antietam ==
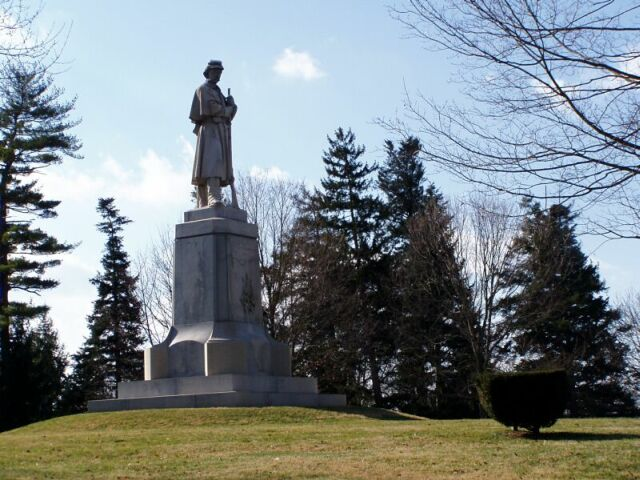
"Old Simon" overlooks 5,032 graves.

Despite one major mishap – the upper half of the soldier fell into the Potomac River while being unloaded at Washington, D.C. – the statue was transported by canal barge to Sharpsburg, and carried on rollers to the National Cemetery. Installed on a new and taller pedestal (attributed to architect George Keller), the monument was dedicated on September 17, 1880 – the eighteenth anniversary of the battle.

George Hess, the first superintendent of Antietam National Cemetery, wrote in 1890:

"In the centre of the grounds is erected a monument commemorative to the great event of the battle, and the heroism of those who sleep at its foot and around it. It is the colossal statue of an American soldier standing guard over the remains of the loyal dead, who are buried all around him, with this inscription on the die or shaft: "Not for Themselves, but for Their Country, September 17, 1862."

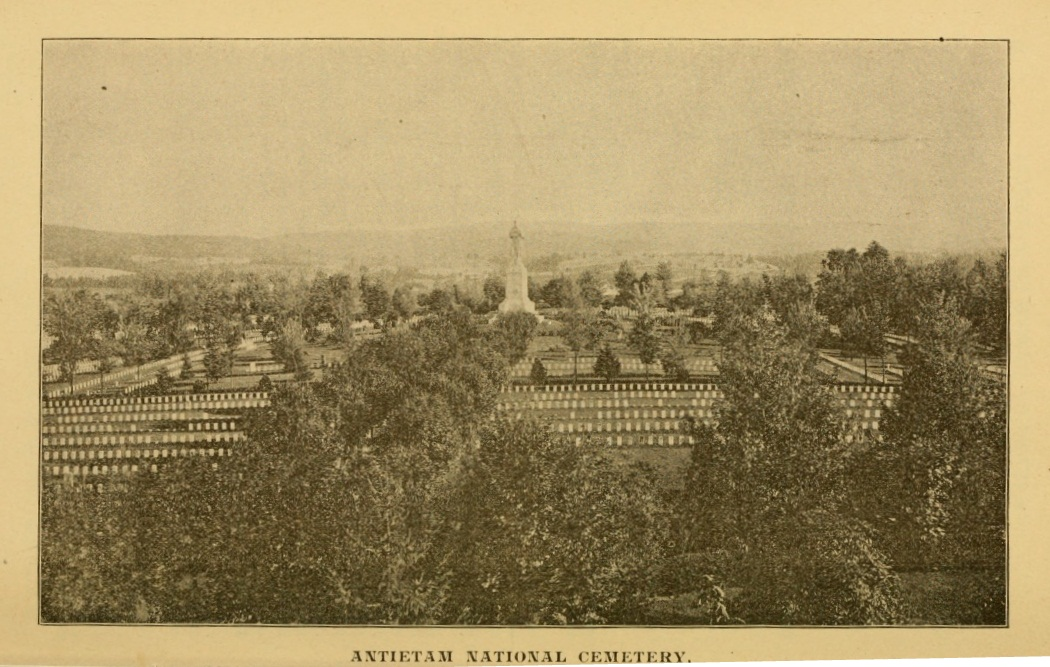
Antietam National Cemetery, circa 1890.
