= Statue of Daniel Webster (U.S. Capitol) =

Marble sculpture

Daniel Webster
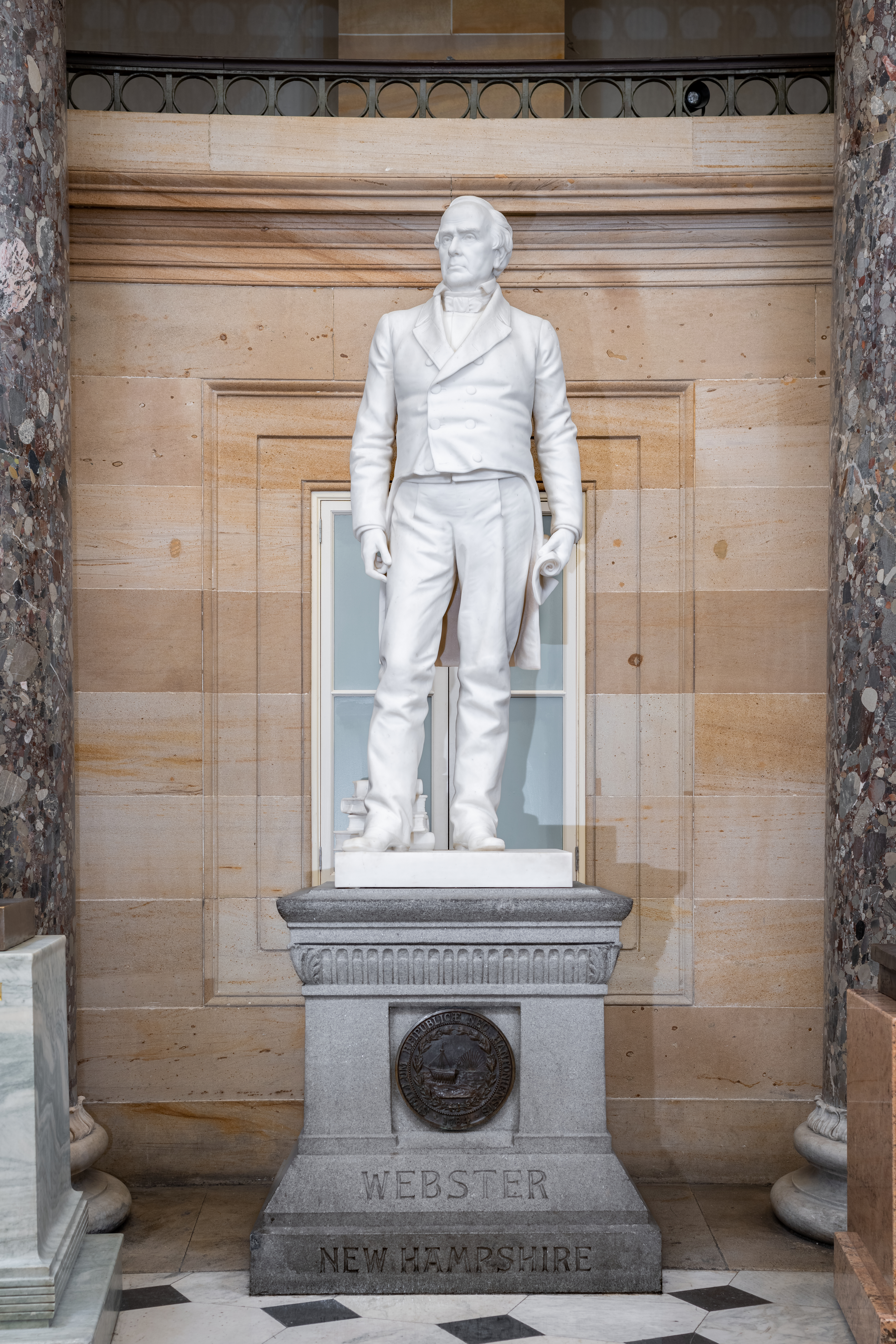
- The statue at the National Statuary Hall in 2023
- Artist: Carl Conrads (after Thomas Ball)
- Medium: Marble sculpture
- Subject: Daniel Webster
- Location: Washington, D.C., United States

Daniel Webster is a marble sculpture depicting the American politician of the same name by Carl Conrads (after Thomas Ball), installed in the United States Capitol's National Statuary Hall, in Washington, D.C., as part of the National Statuary Hall Collection. The state was donated by the U.S. state of New Hampshire in 1894.
