= Thayer Monument =

Statue of Sylvanus Thayer at Westpoint

- United States
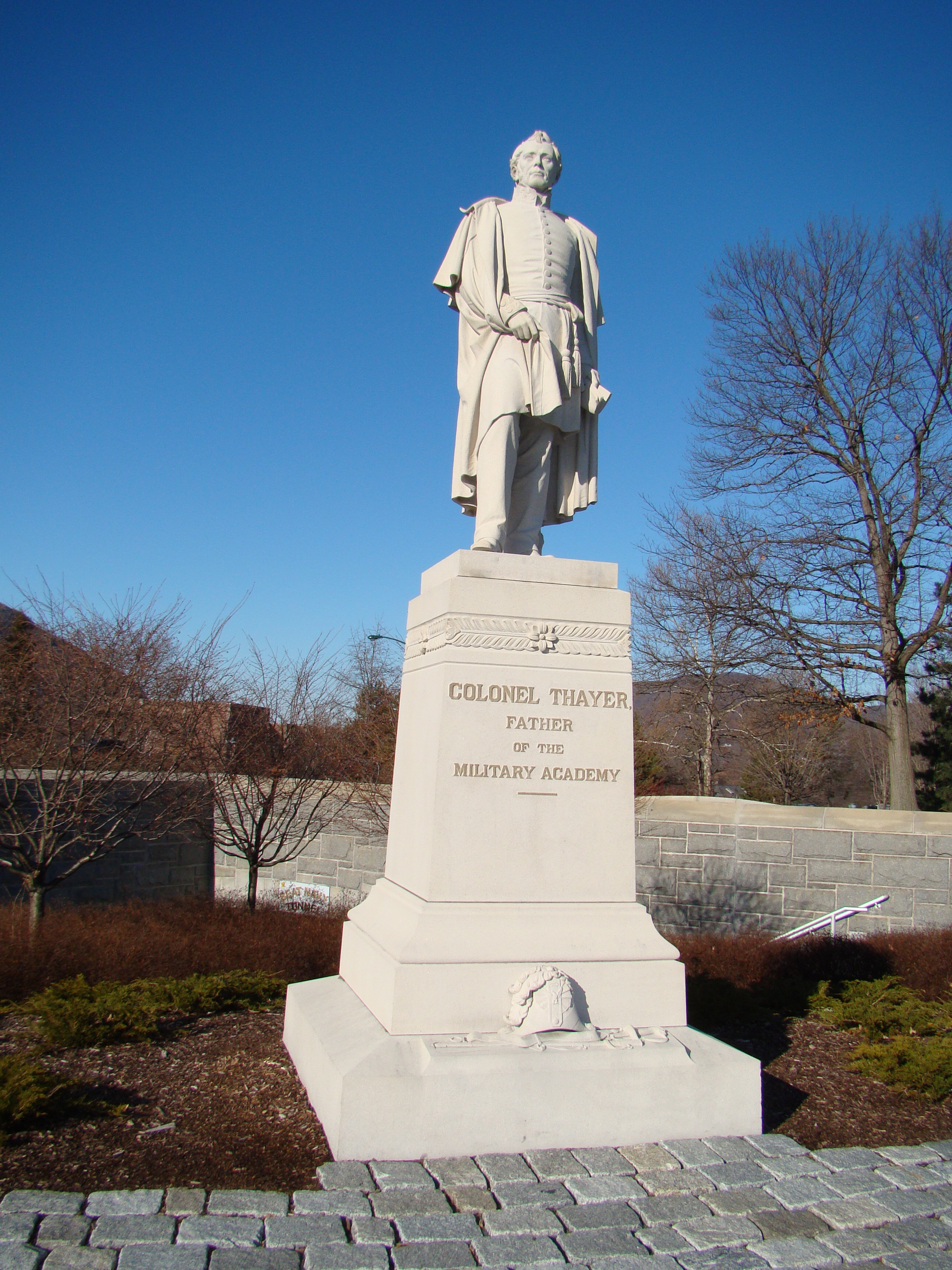
- Thayer monument at West Point
- For Sylvanus Thayer
- Unveiled: June 11, 1883
- Location: 41°23′37″N 073°57′32″W near Highland Falls, New York
- Designed by: Carl Conrads
- "Colonel Thayer: Father of the Military Academy"

Thayer Monument is a white granite monument and statue of Sylvanus Thayer at the United States Military Academy, designed by sculptor Carl Conrads and unveiled on June 11, 1883. Thayer is known as the "Father of the Military Academy" for the profound and lasting impact of his superintendency during the academy's early years. The monument's location has changed over the years. It first occupied the southwest corner of the Plain, but it currently sits at the intersection of Washington and Jefferson roads, adjacent to the Beat Navy tunnel on the northwest corner of the Plain. The memorial is the site of multiple memorial ceremonies during the year as West Point reunions hold a parade and memorial service at the site. Tradition states that the oldest living graduate of the senior reunion class present will lay a wreath at the statue.

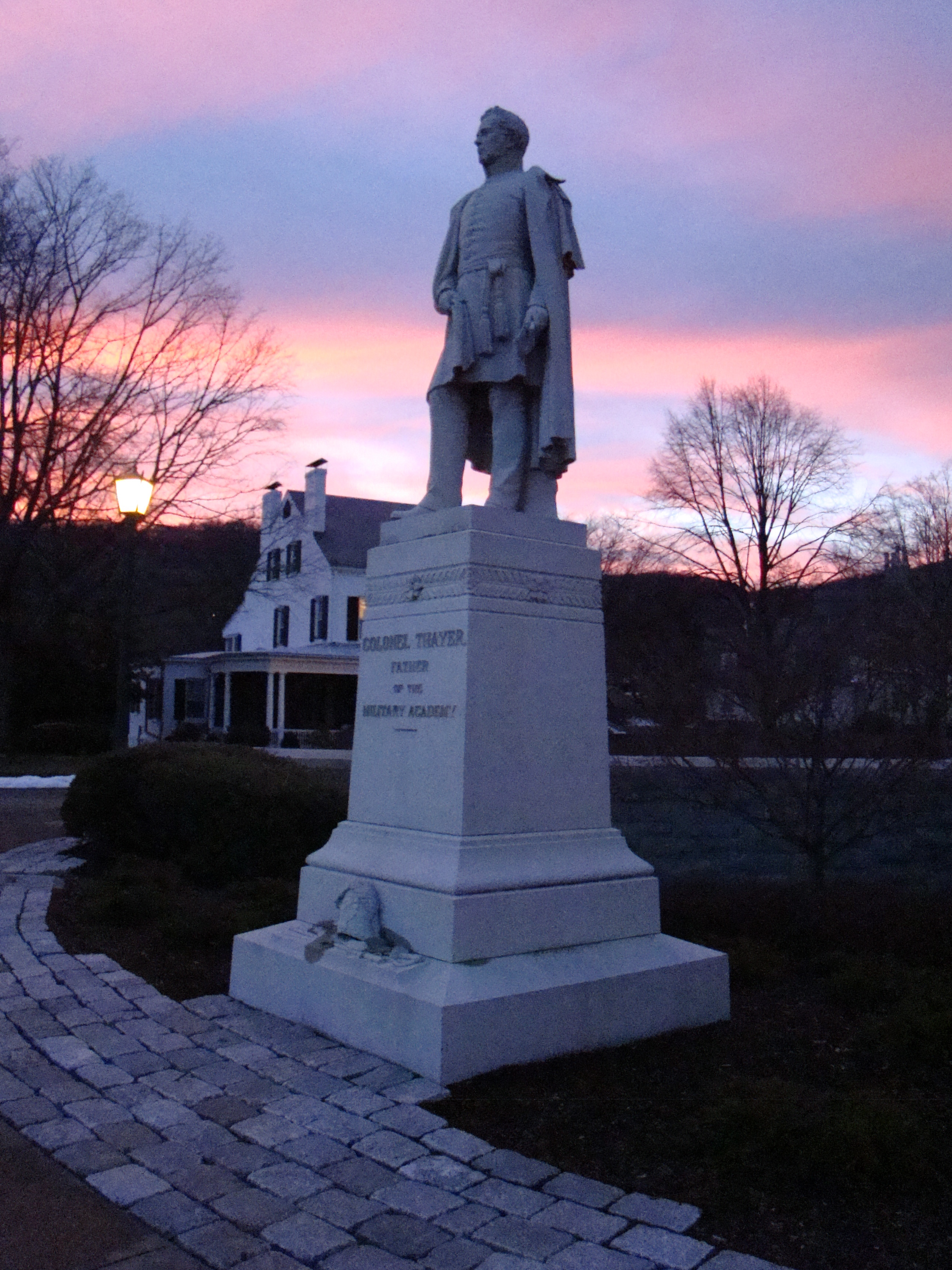
Thayer statue at sunset

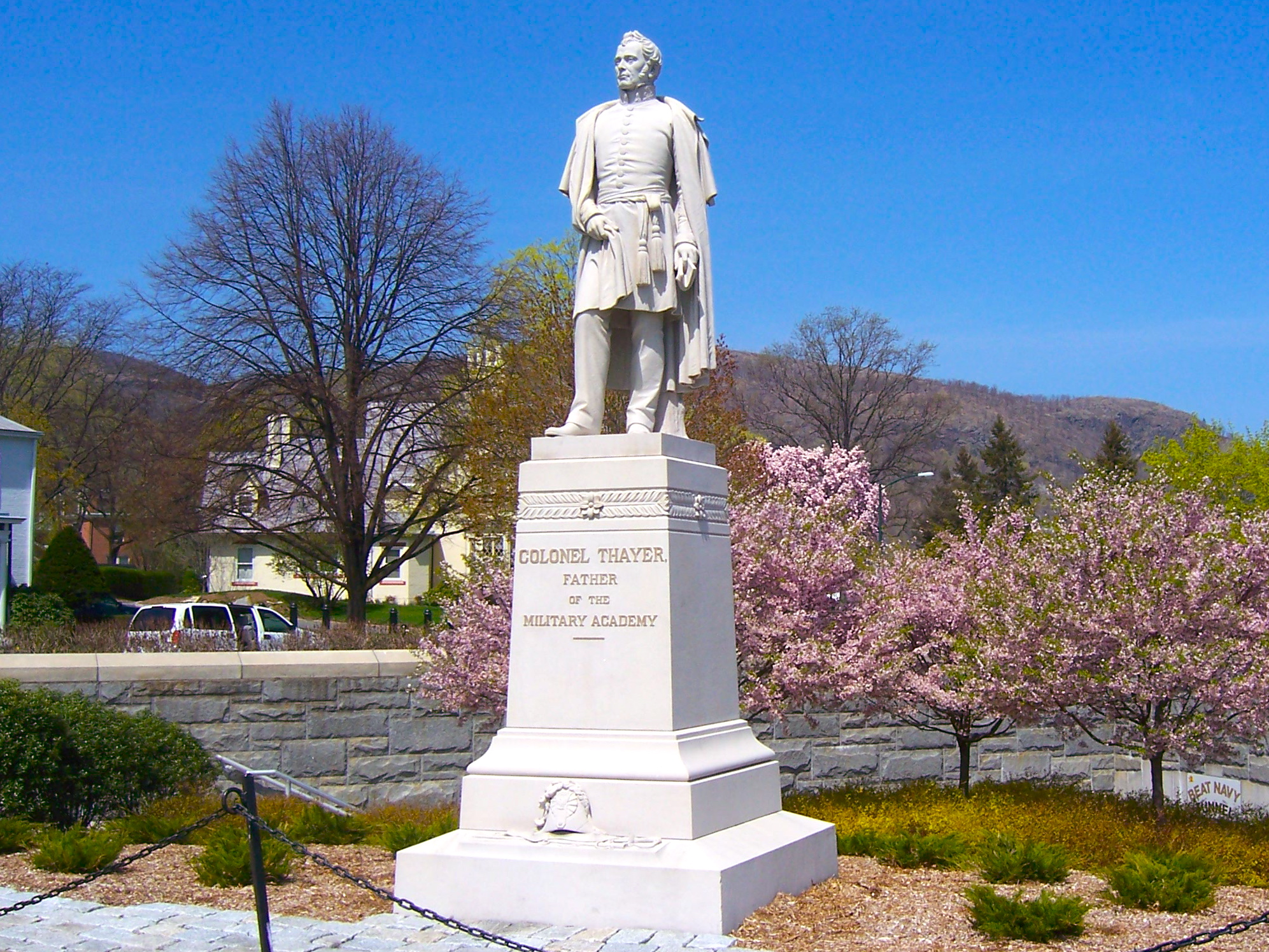
Monument in early spring

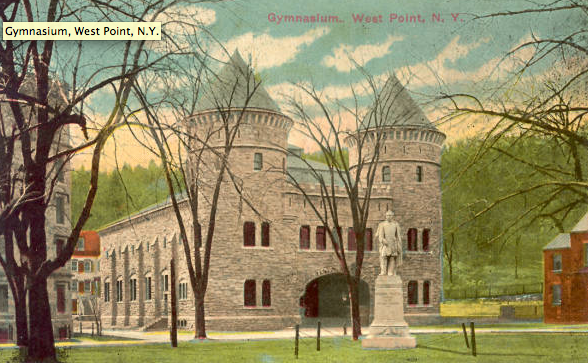
Original location in front of the old gymnasium

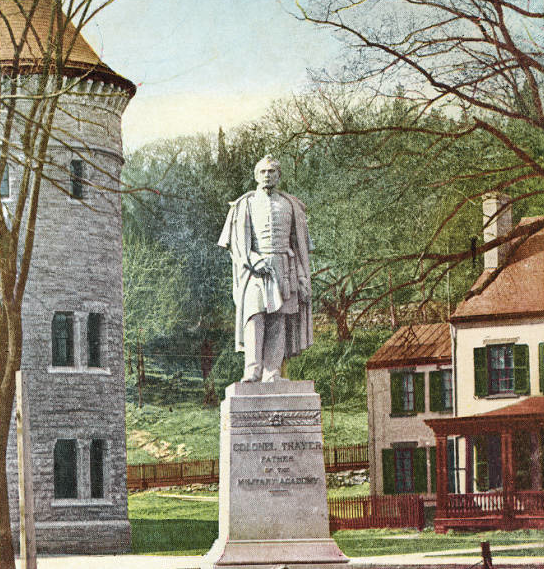
Original location, pre-1910
