= Kynšperk nad Ohří =

- Town
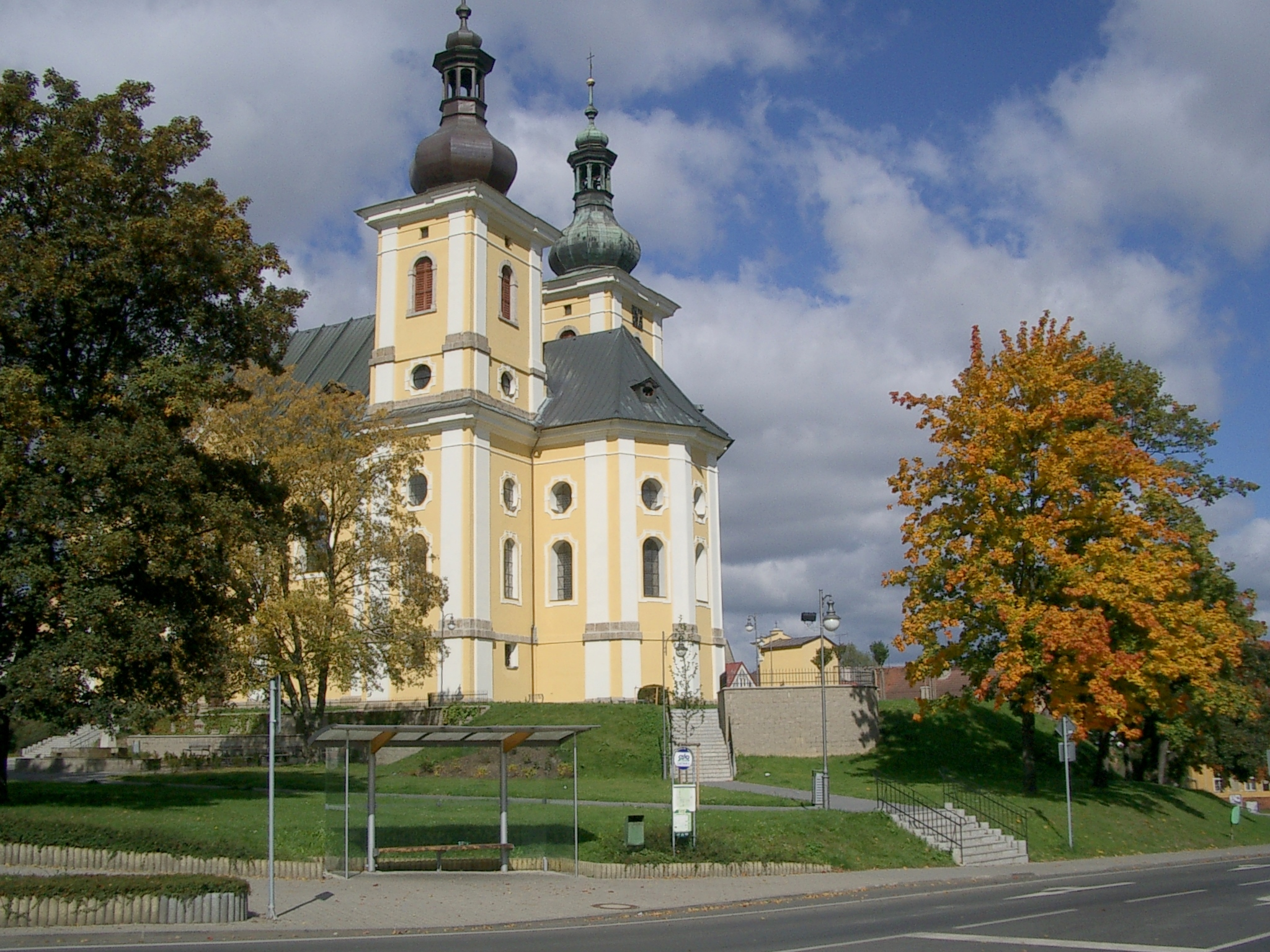
- Church of the Assumption of the Virgin Mary

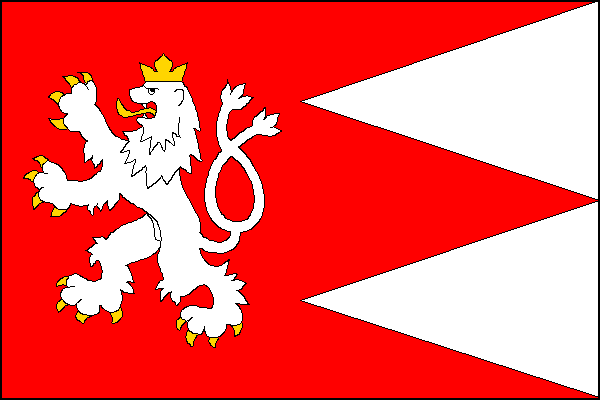
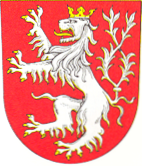
- Flag Coat of arms

- Location in the Czech Republic
- Coordinates: 50°7′8″N 12°31′59″E
- Country: Czech Republic
- Region: Karlovy Vary
- District: Sokolov
- Founded: 1232

Government
  - Mayor: Marek Matoušek

Area
  - Total: 23.31 km^{2} (9.00 sq mi)
- Elevation: 431 m (1,414 ft)

Population (2026-01-01)
  - Total: 4,537
  - Density: 194.6/km^{2} (504.1/sq mi)
- Time zone: UTC+1 (CET)
  - Summer (DST): UTC+2 (CEST)
- Postal codes: 357 51, 358 01
- Website: www.kynsperk.cz

Kynšperk nad Ohří (Czech pronunciation: [ˈkɪnʃpɛrk ˈnat oɦr̝iː]; German: Königsberg an der Eger) is a town in Sokolov District in the Karlovy Vary Region of the Czech Republic. It has about 4,500 inhabitants. The town is located on the Ohře River.

Kynšperk nad Ohří was founded in 1232 and is the oldest Czech locality whose founding charter has survived to this day.

== Administrative division ==
Kynšperk nad Ohří consists of eight municipal parts (in brackets population according to the 2021 census):

- Kynšperk nad Ohří (3,962)
- Chotíkov (54)
- Dolní Pochlovice (236)
- Dvorečky (6)
- Kamenný Dvůr (39)
- Liboc (65)
- Štědrá (39)
- Zlatá (584)

== Etymology ==
The initial German name of Kynšperk nad Ohří was Kuningsberg. The newly founded town took the name of the fortress that previously stood there. The name meant 'king's mountain' in German (but 'berg' could also refer to elevated land between swamps). It is not clear to which king the name referred. The Czech name Kynšperk was created by transciption.

== Geography ==
Kynšperk nad Ohří is located about 10 kilometres (6 mi) southwest of Sokolov and 28 km (17 mi) southwest of Karlovy Vary. It is situated mostly in the Cheb Basin. The southeastern part of the municipal territory extends into the Slavkov Forest and includes the highest point of Kynšperk nad Ohří at 580 m (1,903 ft) above sea level.

The Ohře River flows through the town. The Libava Stream flows through the eastern part of the municipal territory. North of the town is located Boží požehnání Lake, an artificial lake created during the revitalisation of a former lignite mine.

== History ==
Kynšperk nad Ohří was founded in 1232. The town's founding charter is the oldest preserved document of establishing a locality in the Czech Republic and is stored in the National Archives in Prague. The town was founded at the Libava Stream about 2 kilometres (1.2 mi) to the east, but then it was moved to its present location (not later than during the reign of King Charles IV in 1346–1378). The inhabitants lived mainly on agriculture and small crafts, but in the 18th century, carpentry and later mining developed. In the 19th and 20th centuries, the town was industrialised.

== Demographics ==
Historical population

Year	Pop.	±%
1869	5,640	—
1880	5,635	−0.1%
1890	5,438	−3.5%
1900	6,253	+15.0%
1910	6,903	+10.4%

Year	Pop.	±%
1921	6,702	−2.9%
1930	7,061	+5.4%
1950	3,458	−51.0%
1961	4,140	+19.7%
1970	5,542	+33.9%

Year	Pop.	±%
1980	5,095	−8.1%
1991	5,202	+2.1%
2001	5,160	−0.8%
2011	5,736	+11.2%
2021	4,985	−13.1%

Source: Censuses

== Transport ==
The D6 motorway runs next to the town.

Kynšperk nad Ohří is located on the main railway lines Prague–Cheb and Plzeň–Karlovy Vary.

== Sights ==
The main landmark of the town is the Church of the Assumption of the Virgin Mary. It was built in the Baroque style in 1721–1727 and belongs to the most significant Baroque monuments in the region.

== Notable people ==
- Caspar Buberl (1834–1899), American sculptor
- Alfred Scharf (1900–1965), British art historian

== Twin towns – sister cities ==
Kynšperk nad Ohří is twinned with:

- Himmelkron, Germany
