= Caspar Buberl =

Bohemian born American sculptor (1834–1899)

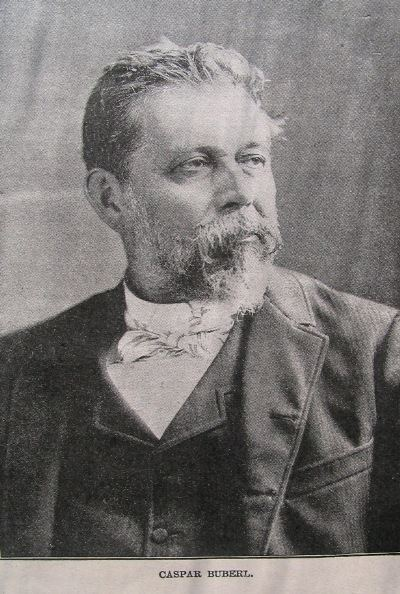
- Born: 1834; Kynšperk nad Ohří, Austrian Empire
- Died: August 22, 1899 (aged 64–65); New York City, United States
- Known for: Sculpture
- Spouse: Anna Stubner (m. 1856)

Caspar Buberl (1834 – August 22, 1899) was an American sculptor. He is best known for his Civil War monuments, for the terra cotta relief panels on the Garfield Memorial in Cleveland, Ohio (depicting the various stages of James Garfield's life), and for the 1,200-foot (370 m)-long frieze on the Pension Building in Washington, D.C.

== Biography ==
Born in Königsberg, Bohemia, (now Kynšperk nad Ohří, Czech Republic), as a young man Buberl studied art in Prague and Vienna before immigrating to the United States in 1854 to train under sculptor Robert Eberhard Launitz.

He married Anna Stubner in 1856, and they had nine children.

In 1882 Montgomery C. Meigs was chosen to design and construct the new Pension Building, now the National Building Museum, in Washington D. C. and, in doing so, broke away from the established Greco-Roman models that had been the basis of government buildings in Washington up until then, and was to continue to be following the Pension Building's completion. Meigs based his design on Italian Renaissance precedents, notably Rome's Palazzo Farnese and Plazzo della Cancelleria.

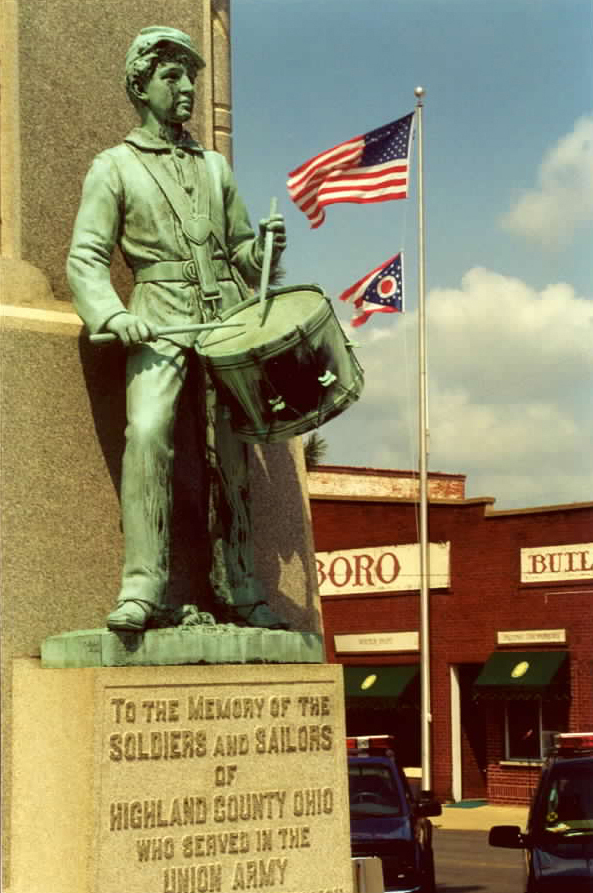
Hillsboro, Ohio Civil War Monument

Included in his design was a 1,200-foot (370 m)-long sculptured frieze executed by Buberl. Since creating a work of sculpture of that size was well out of Meigs' budget, he had Buberl create 28 different scenes [totaling 69 feet (21 m) in length), which were then mixed and slightly modified to create the continuous parade that includes over 1,300 individual figures. Because of the way that the 28 sections were modified and intermixed, it is only by somewhat careful examination that the frieze reveals itself to be the same figures repeated some eighteen times. The sculpture includes infantry, navy, artillery, cavalry and medical components as well as a good deal of the supply and quartermaster functions, since Meigs had overseen the latter two functions during the Civil War.

Meigs insisted that any teamster included in the Quartermaster panel "must be a negro, a plantation slave, freed by war". This figure was ultimately to assume a position in the center, over the west entrance to the building.

Buberl created dozens of Civil War statues and monuments for various cities and states, including several for New York veterans associations to be placed on the Gettysburg Battlefield and a bronze bust of President Abraham Lincoln, which was recently sold for $5,800. His impressive New York State Monument crowns Cemetery Hill, and a number of individual memorials for specific regiments dot the battlefield.

He died at his studio in New York City.

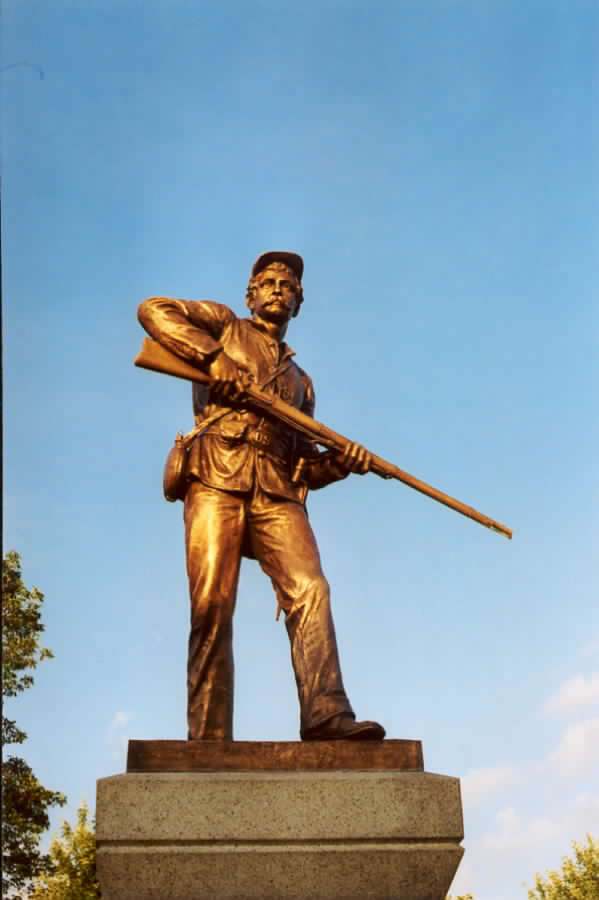
111th NY Infantry Monument

== Leading works ==
=== Monuments on the Gettysburg battlefield ===
- 9th New York Cavalry Monument – dedicated July 1, 1888
- 4th New York Independent Battery – dedicated July 2, 1888
- 5th New York Cavalry Monument – dedicated July 3, 1888
- 126th New York Infantry – dedicated October 3, 1888
- 10th New York Cavalry Monument – dedicated October 9, 1888
- 54th New York Infantry – dedicated July 4, 1890
- 111th New York Infantry Monument – dedicated June 26, 1891
- New York State Monument – dedicated July 2, 1893
- 41st New York Infantry – dedicated July 3, 1893
- 52nd New York Infantry – dedicated July 3, 1893
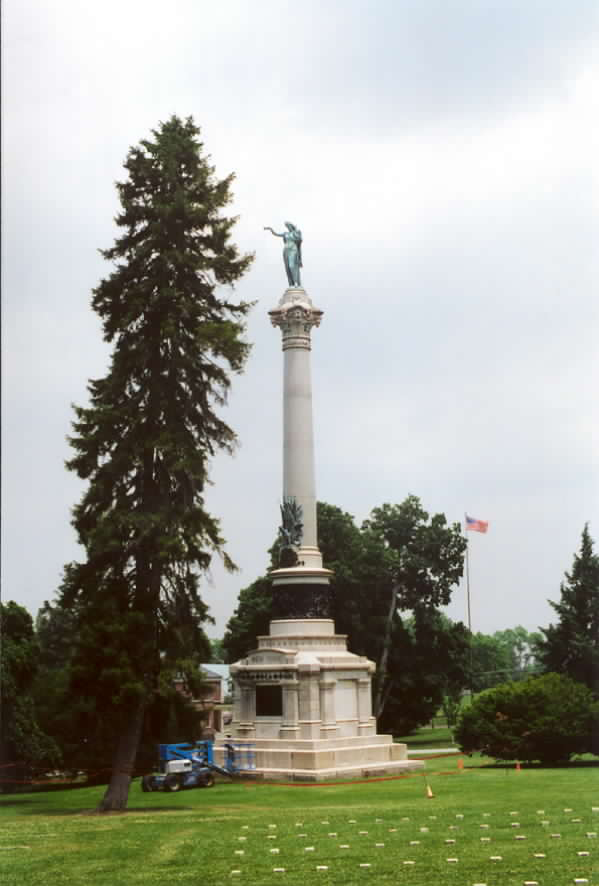
New York State Monument

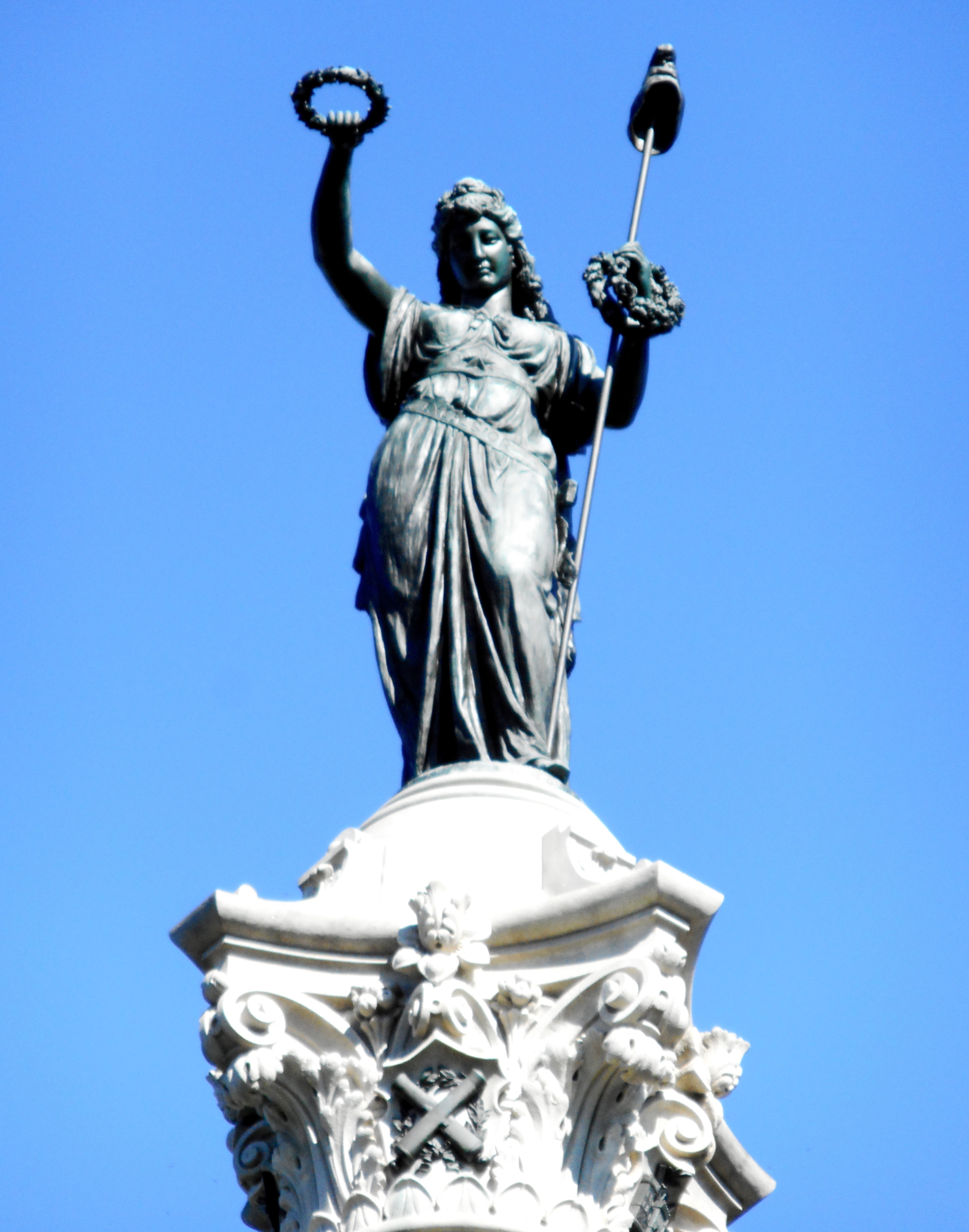
Figure of Liberty atop the NY State Monument

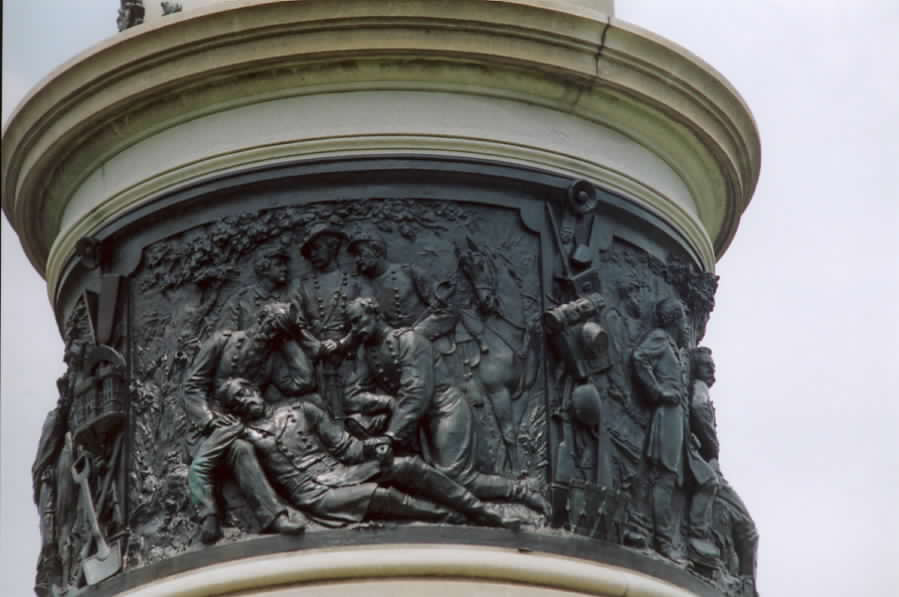
Death of General Reynolds, detail of the NY State Monument

=== Other Civil War monuments ===
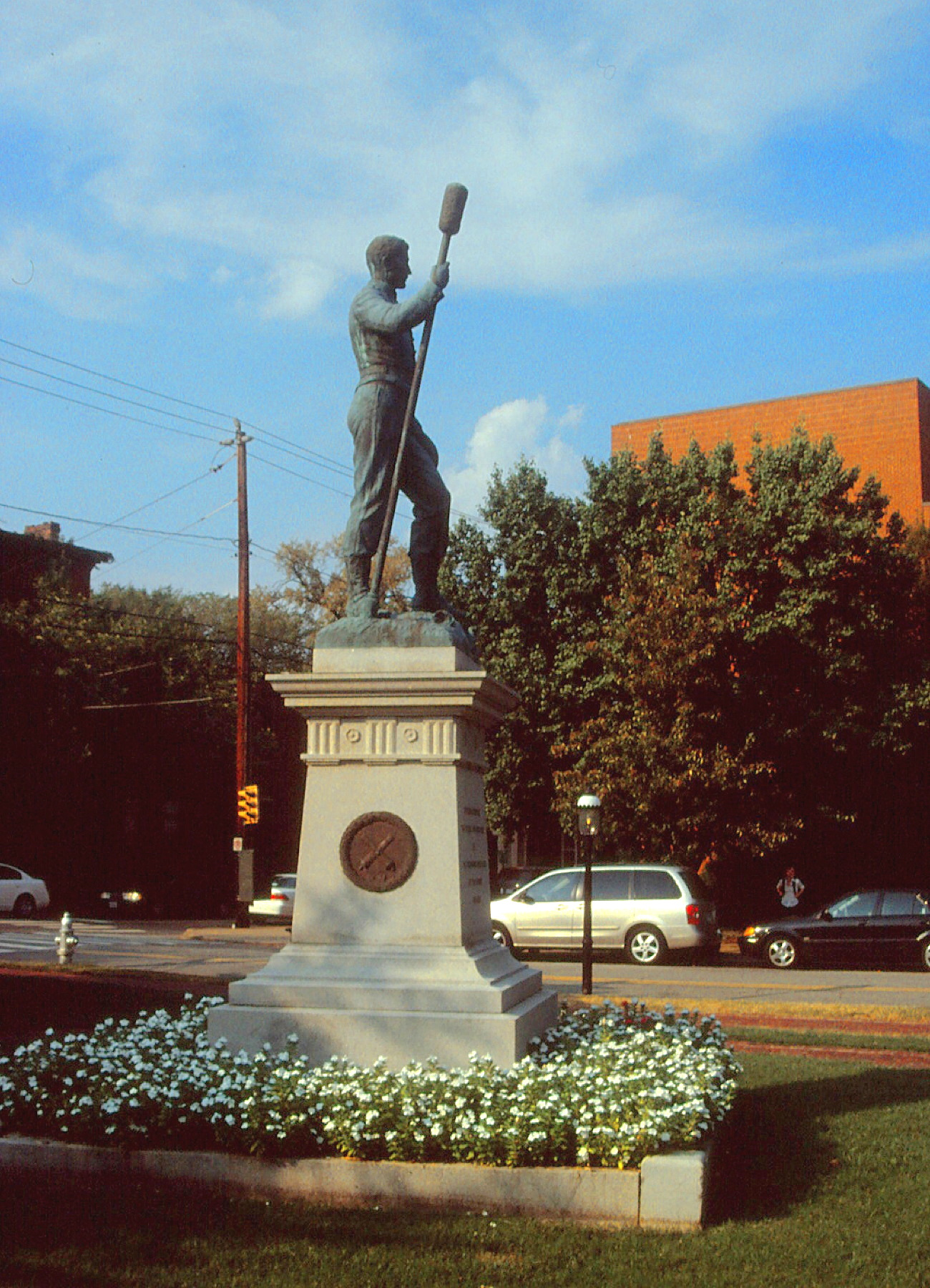
Howitzer Monument

- Civil War Monument, Manchester, New Hampshire, George Keller, architect, 1879
- Soldiers and Sailors Monument, Buffalo, New York, George Keller, architect, 1884
- Soldiers and Sailors Monument, Nashua, New Hampshire, 1889
- Alexandria Confederate Memorial, Alexandria, Virginia, 1889
- Soldiers and Sailors Monument, Troy, New York, 1890.
  - Four relief panels: Cavalry, Artillery, Infantry, The Monitor and the Merrimac
- A.P. Hill Monument, Richmond, Virginia, 1892
- Howitzer Monument, Richmond, Virginia, 1892
- Confederate Monument, University of Virginia Cemetery, Charlottesville, Virginia, 1893
- Raphael Semmes Monument, Mobile, Alabama, 1899

=== Other memorials and monuments ===
- Fulton Memorial, Fulton Park, Brooklyn, New York, 1872
- Fireman's Memorial, Church Square Park, Hoboken, New Jersey, 1891
- Dewey Triumphal Arch, Spanish–American War, New York City, 1899

=== Architectural sculpture ===
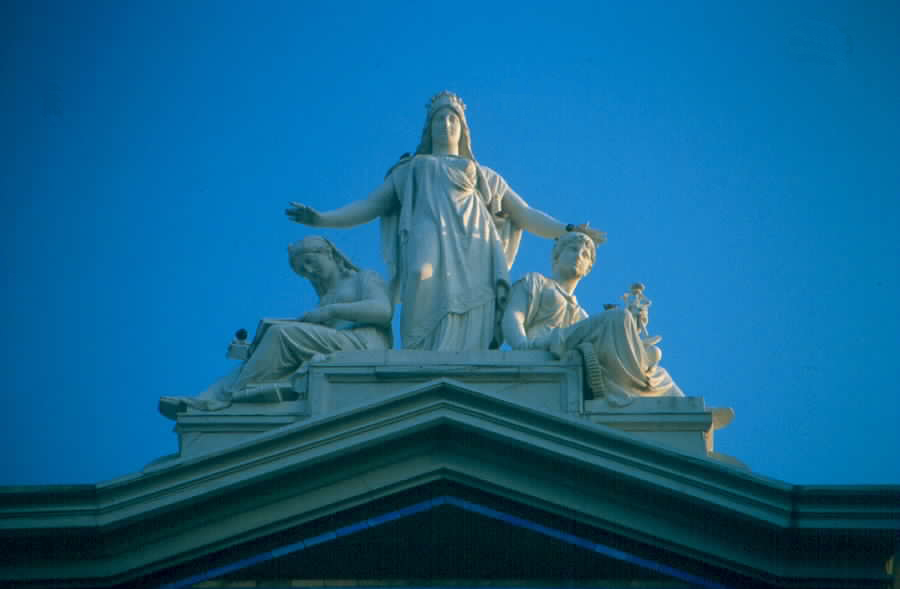
Columbia Protecting Science and Industry, Washington D.C.

- Columbia Defending Science and Industry, National Museum/Art and Industries Building, Washington, D.C., Adolph Cluss, architect, Montgomery Meigs, associate architect, 1881
- Pension Building Frieze, National Building Museum, Washington, D.C., Montgomery Meigs, architect, 1883
- James A. Garfield Memorial, Lake View Cemetery, Cleveland, Ohio, George Keller, architect, 1890
- Soldiers and Sailors Memorial Arch, Hartford, Connecticut, George Keller, architect, 1890

=== Pension Building frieze ===
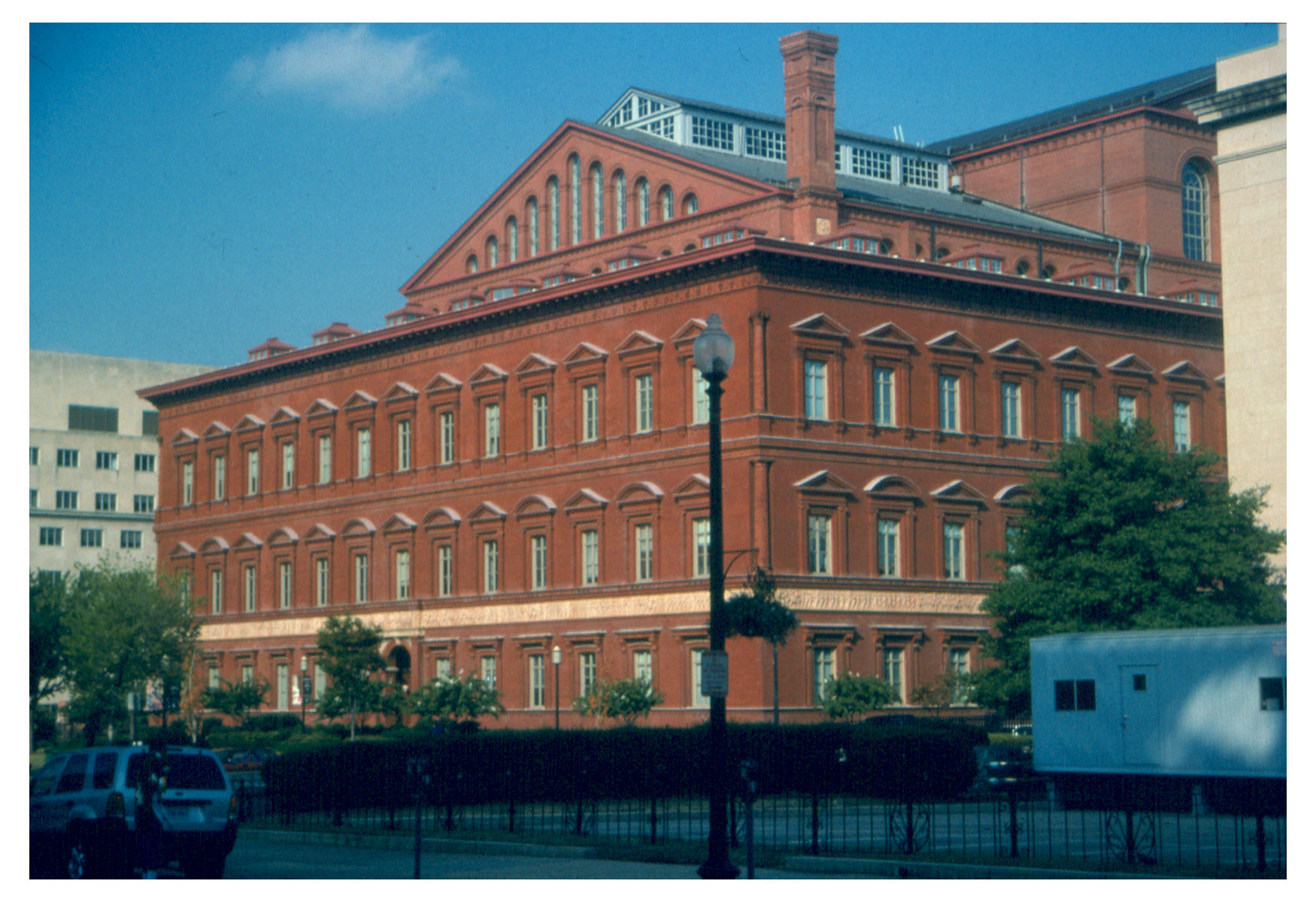
National Building Museum

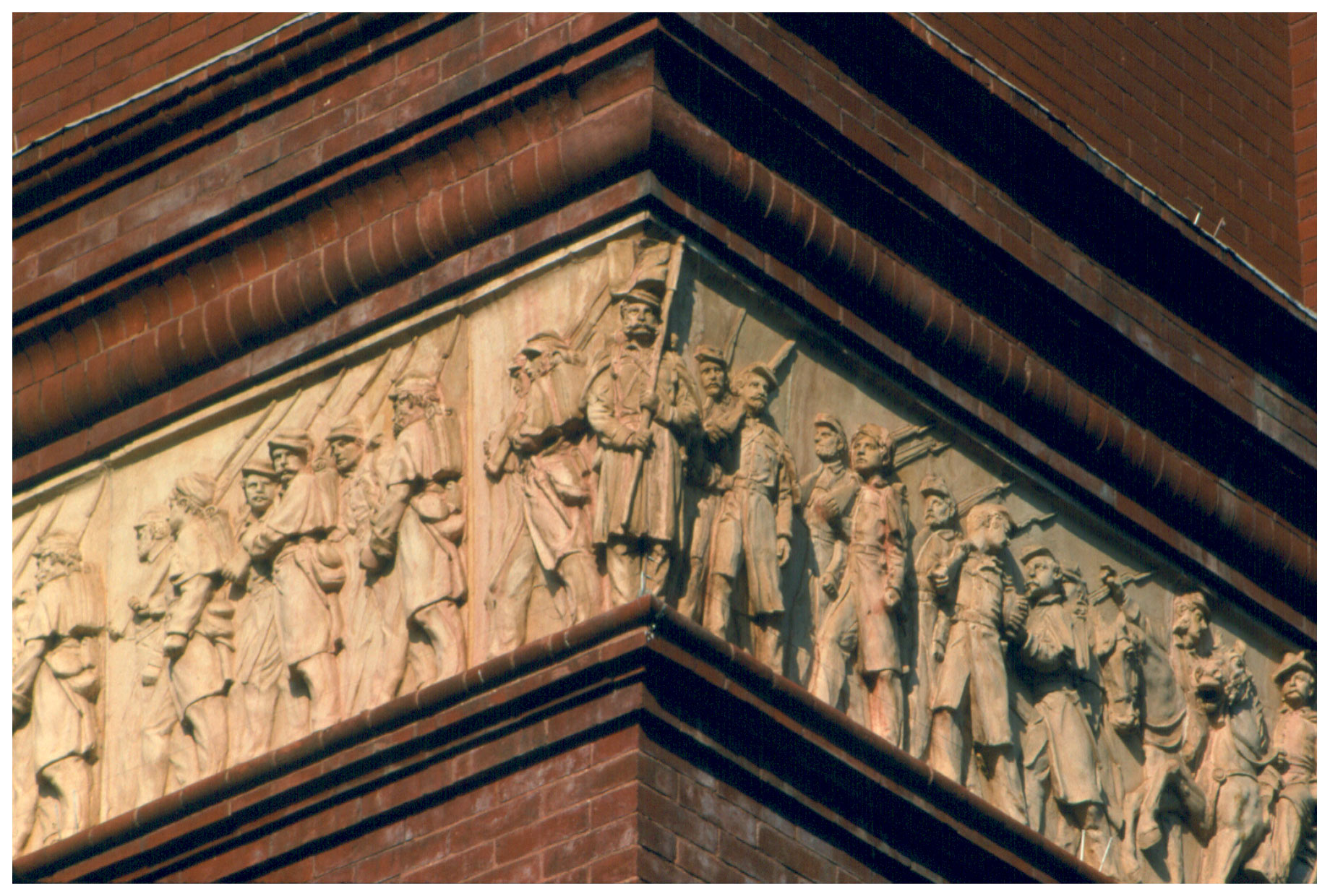
Corner figures

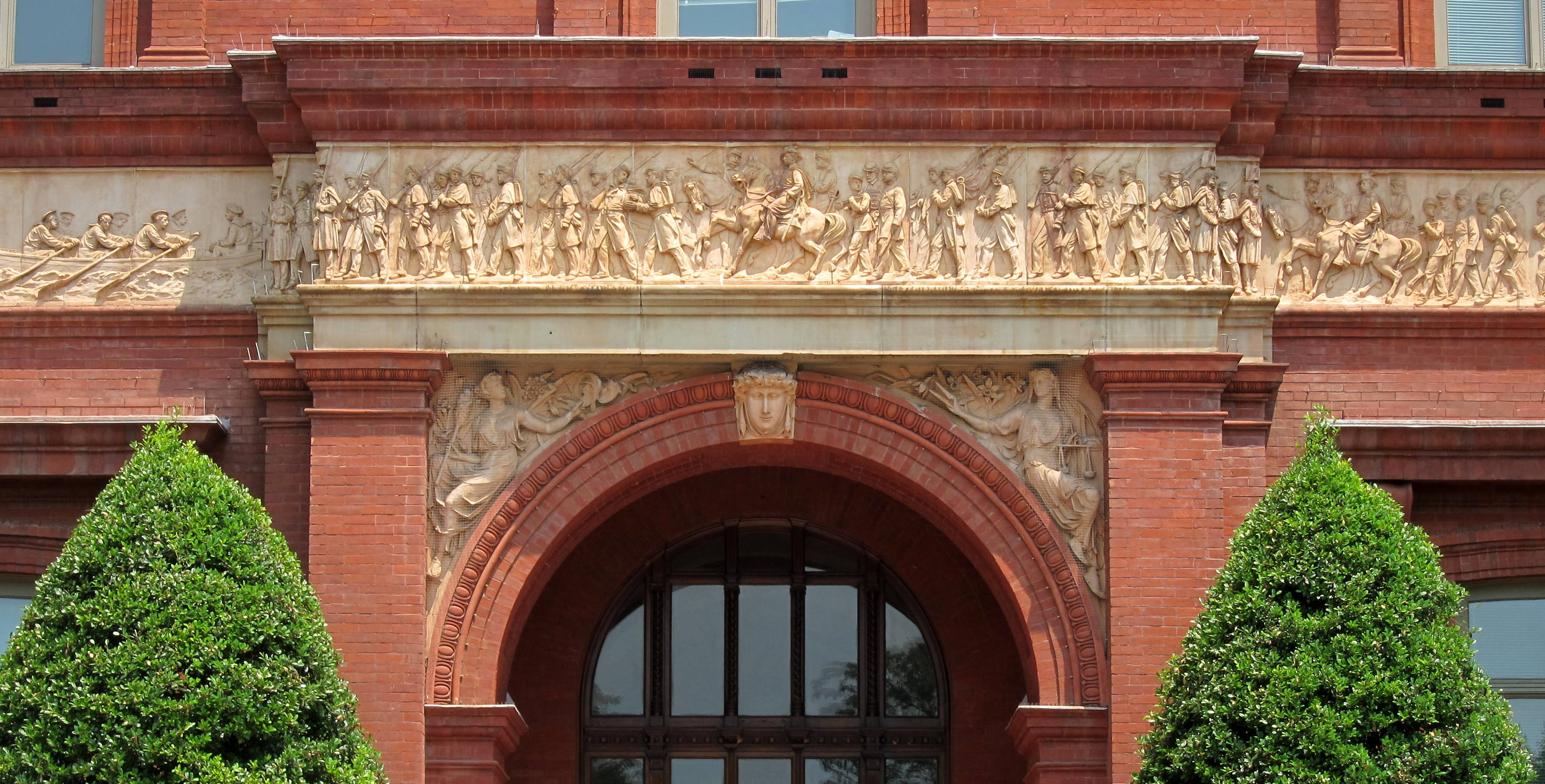
South entrance

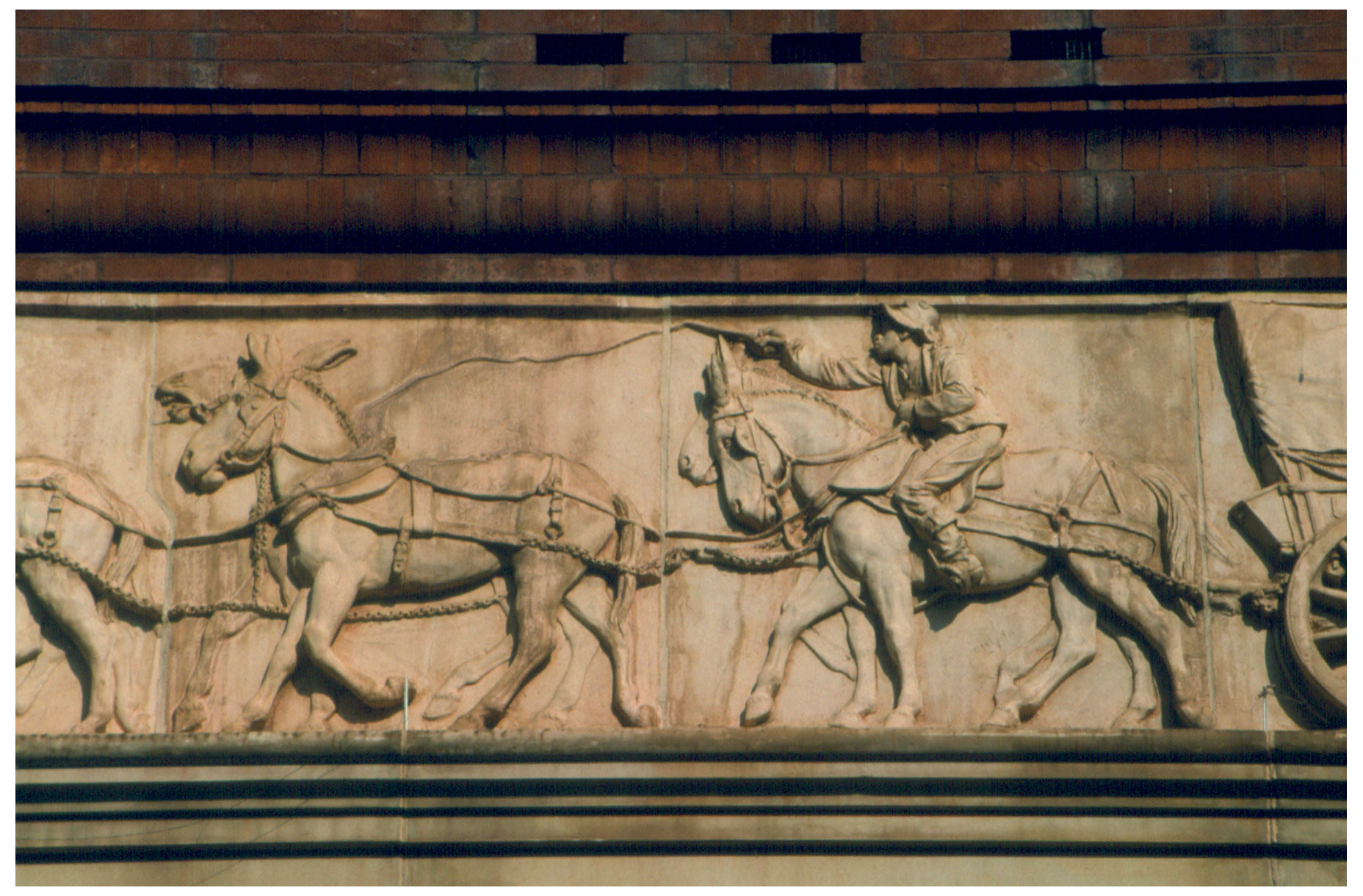
Black teamster

=== Images of the James A. Garfield Memorial ===
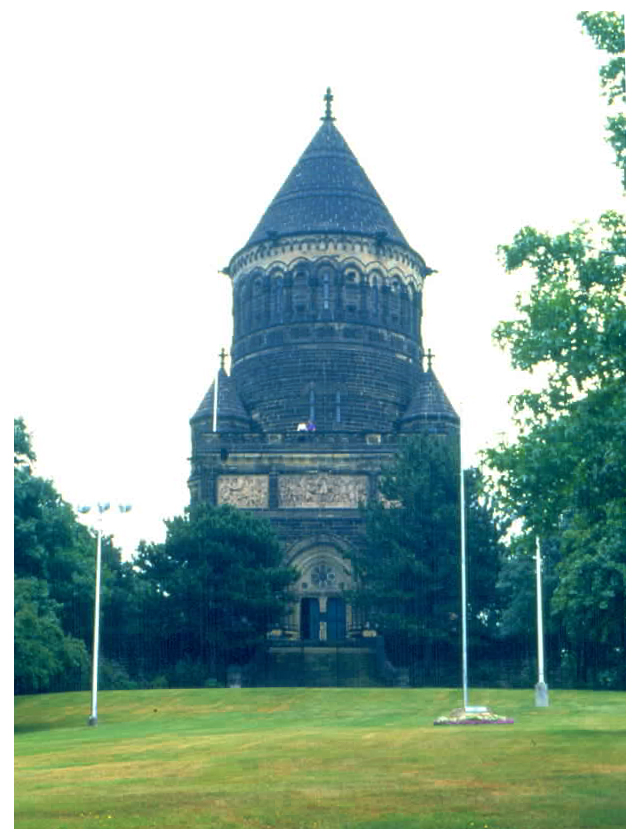
James A. Garfield Memorial, Lake View Cemetery, Cleveland, Ohio, 1890, George Keller, architect

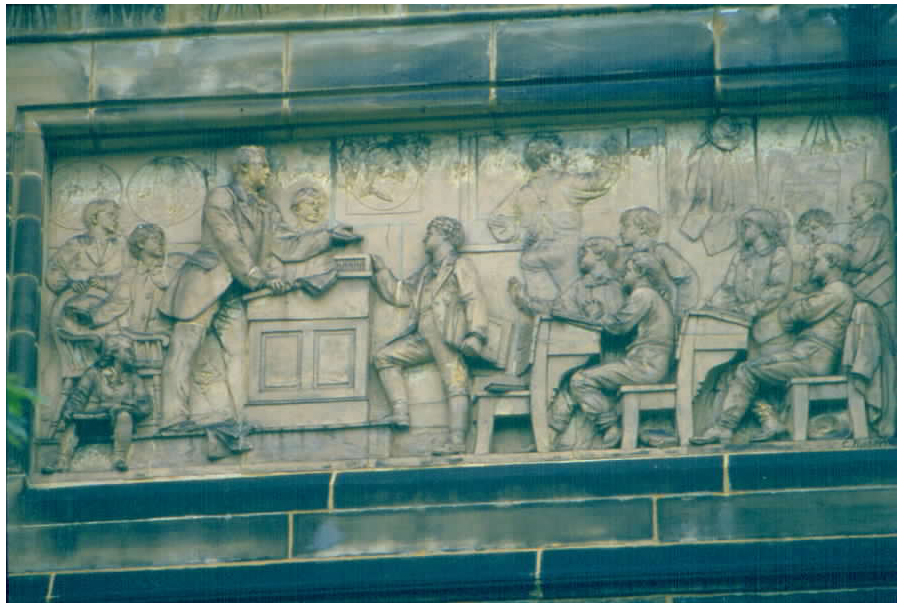
James A. Garfield Memorial detail – Garfield, the Educator

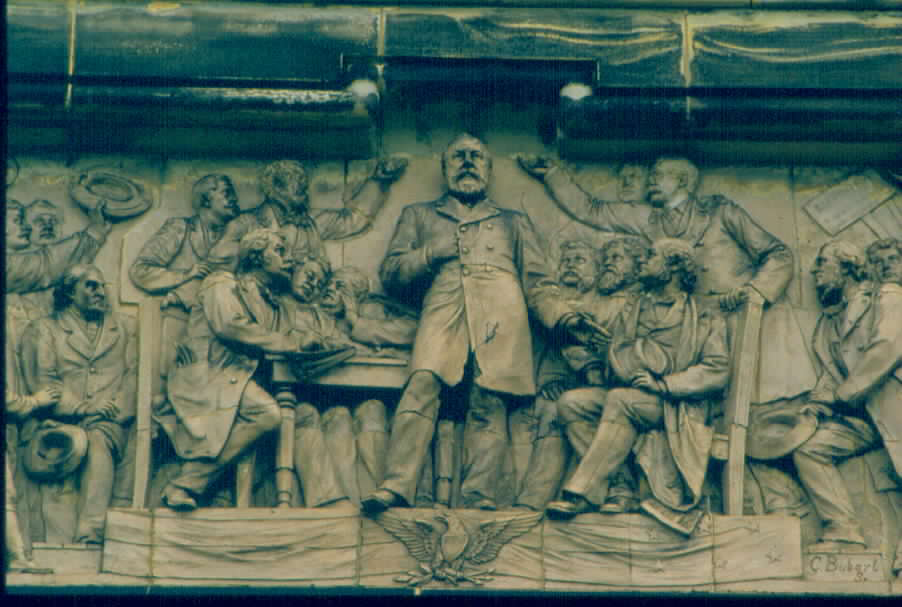
James A. Garfield Memorial detail – Garfield, the Civil War Hero

James A. Garfield Memorial detail – Garfield, the Martyred President

=== Images of Hartford memorial ===
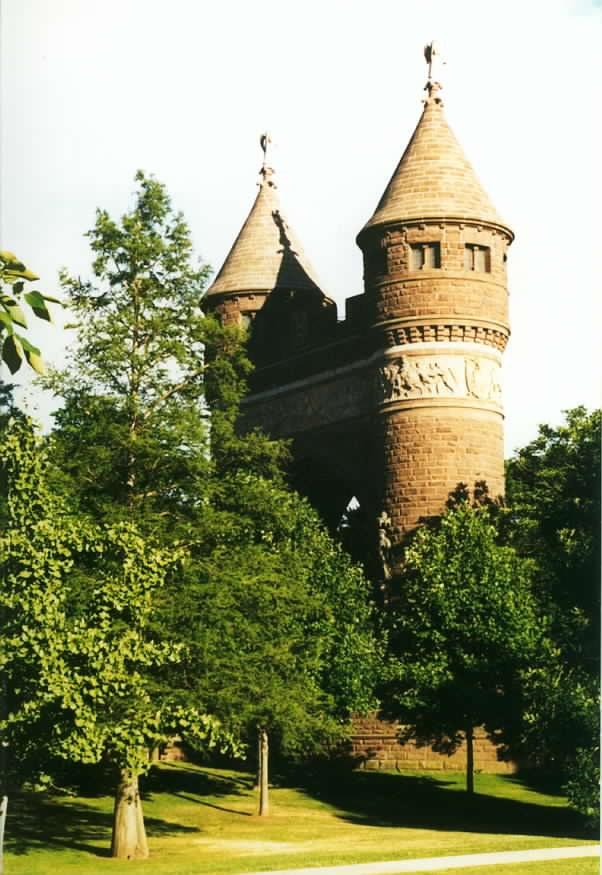
Soldiers and Sailors Memorial Arch, Hartford, Connecticut, 1885, George Keller, architect

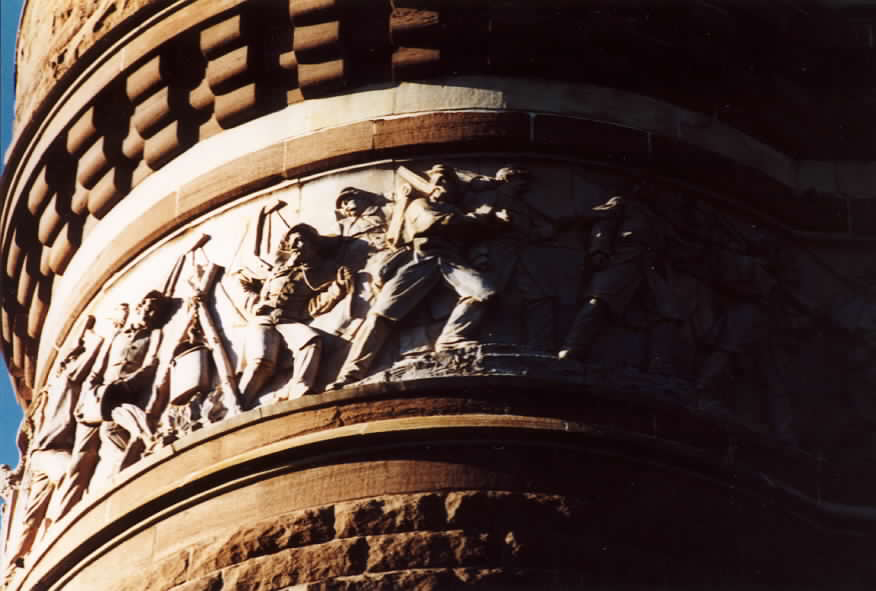
Hartford detail

=== Images of Buffalo memorial ===
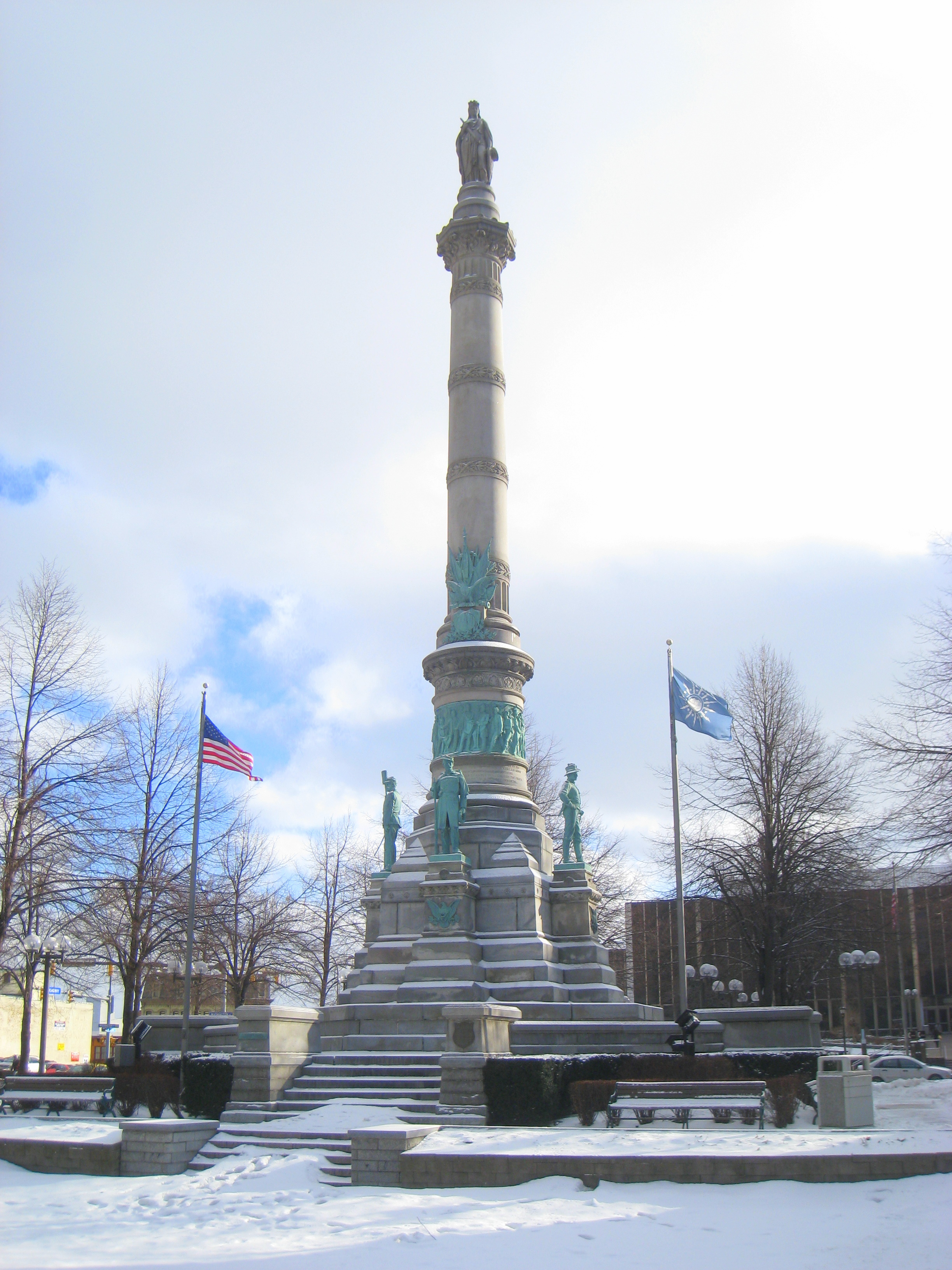
Buffalo Civil War Monument, 1883

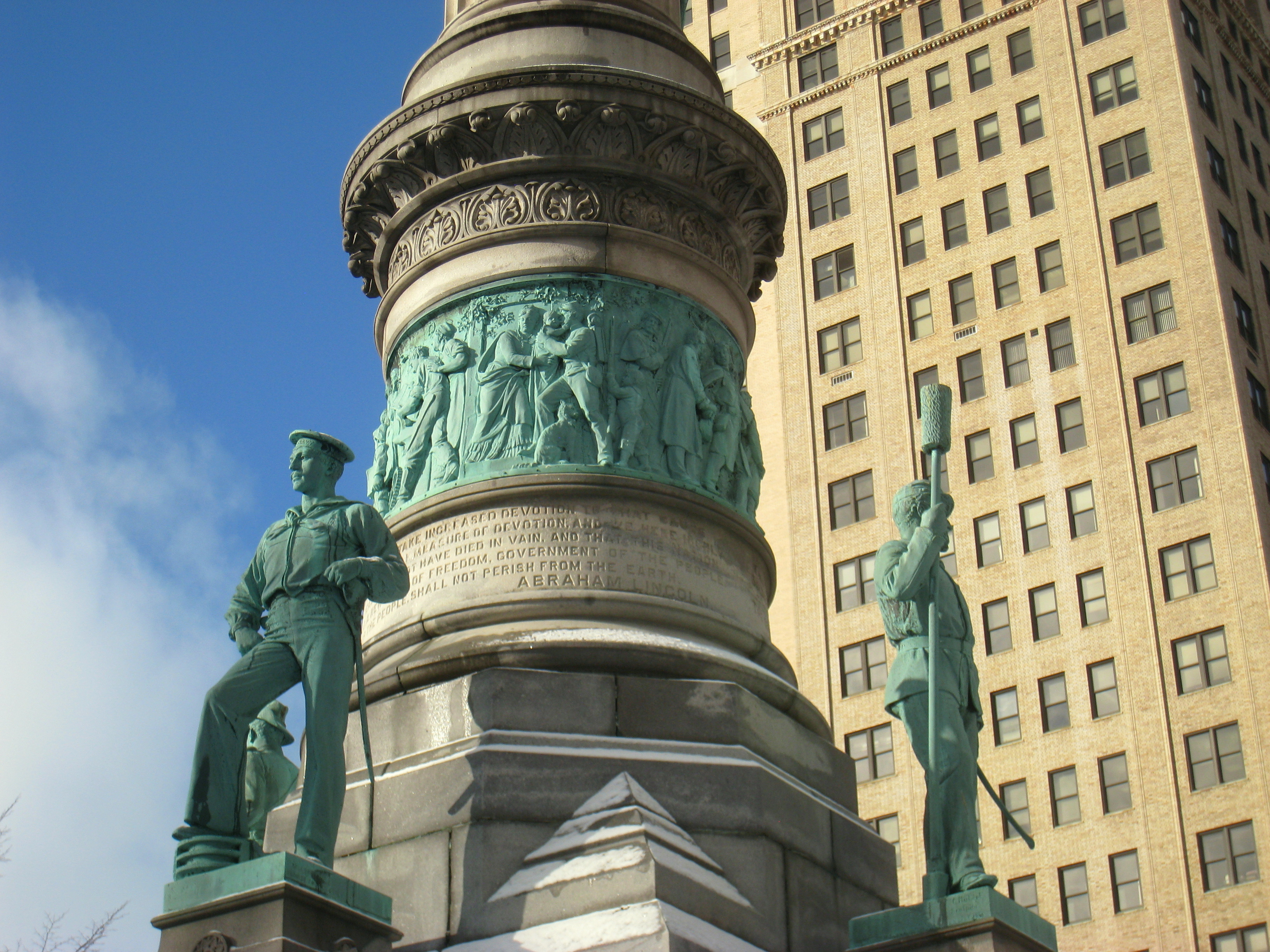
Detail

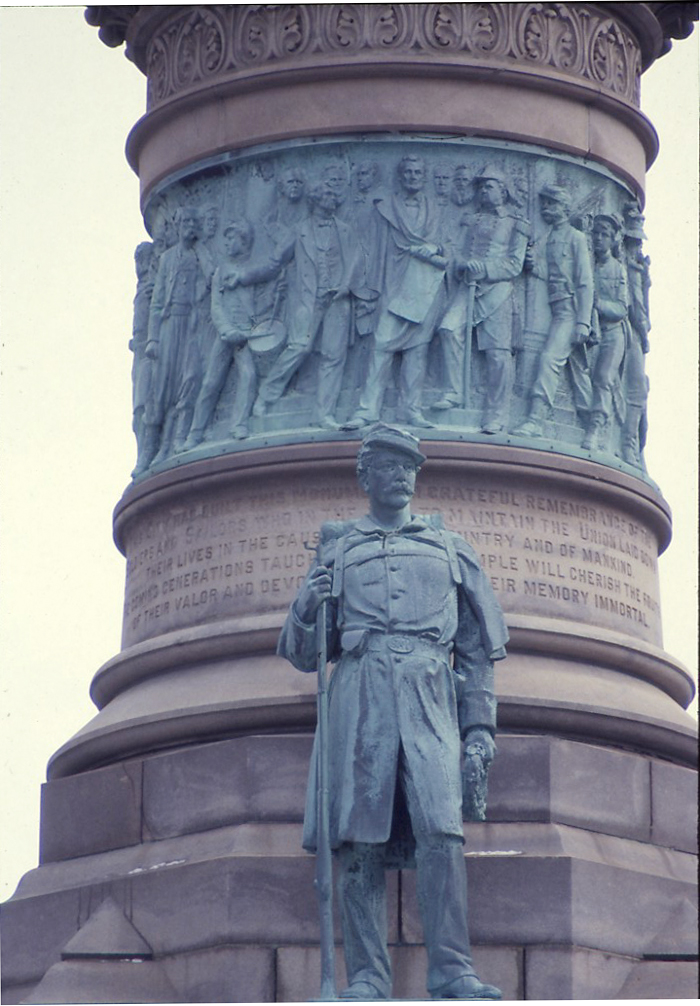
Detail

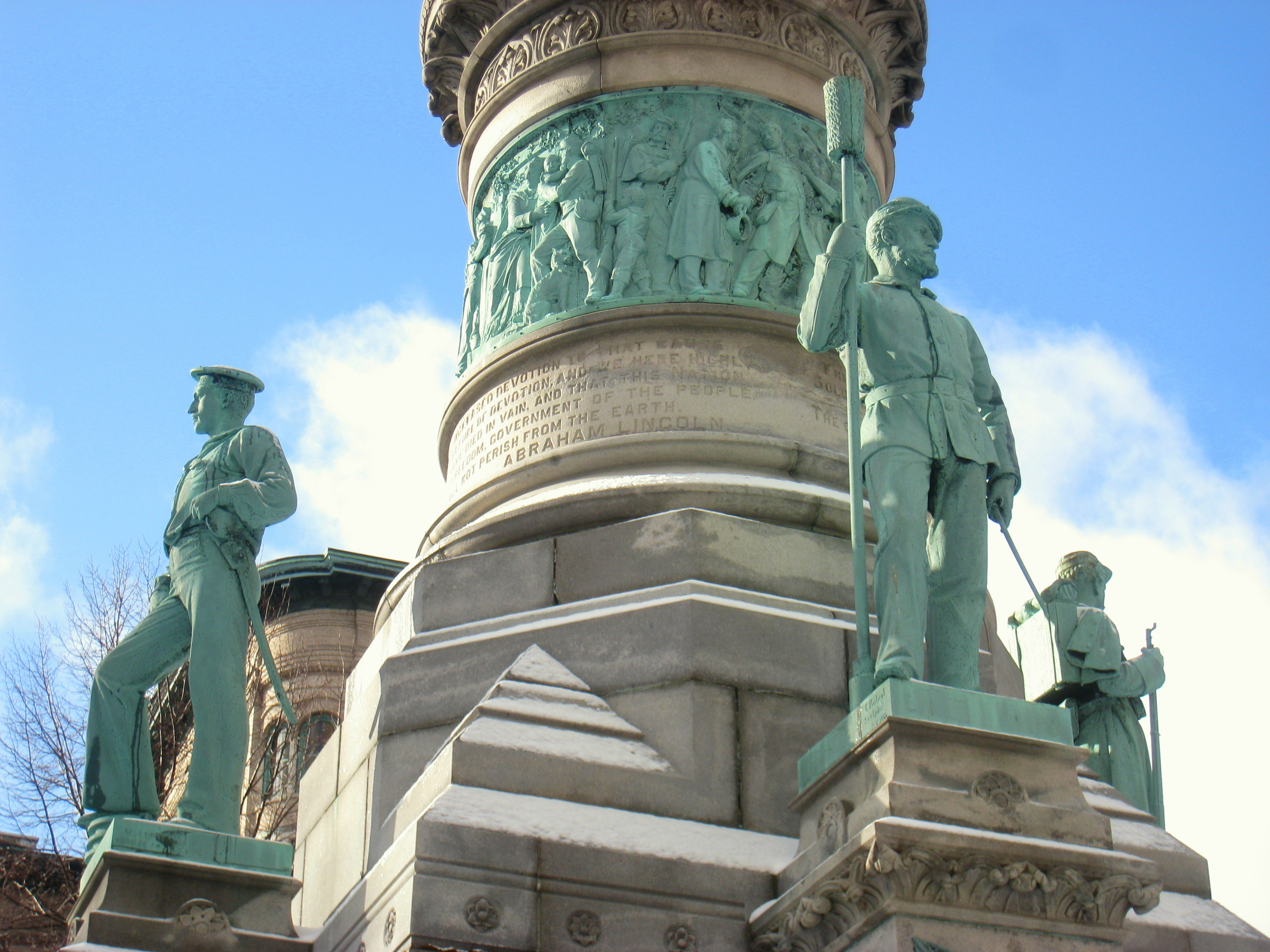
Detail
