= Alfred Scharf =

British art historian (1900 - 1965)

Alfred Scharf (25 November 1900, Kynšperk nad Ohří – 20 December 1965, London) was a German-born British art historian.

== Early life and education ==
Scharf was born 25 November 1900 in Königsberg, Bohemia (presently Kynšperk nad Ohří, Czech Republic), the oldest of four sons, to Heinrich Scharf (1872–1933), a businessman who founded Goldring, an audio equipment company, and Cäcilie Scharf (née Presser; 1876–1946), into a German Jewish family. His brothers were; Erwin Scharf (1902–1978), Otto Scharf (1903–1942) and Friedrich Scharf (1904–1976).

He graduated from Kaiser-Wilhelm-Realgymnasium in Berlin in 1920 and studied art history, classical archeology, East Asian art history and theater history in Berlin, Munich and Freiburg from 1920 to 1925. In 1925 he promoted as Dr. phil. in Freiburg with a work supervised by Hans Jantzen on history of stage design.

== Career ==
From 1925 to 1928, Scharf worked as research assistant at Kupferstichkabinett department of Berlin State Museums, Kaiser Friedrich Museum and Kunstbibliothek. During his time at the Kupferstichkabinett he took part in the work of the catalog of Dutch masters.

From 1928 to 1932, Scharf worked as a freelance writer, among others as editor of the magazine Der Cicerone and Weltkunst. His plans to habilitatewith a postdoctoral dissertation on Filippino Lippi at the University of Frankfurt failed because of his Jewish descent and the anti-semitic currents at the University of Frankfurt.

He then emigrated to Great Britain in May 1933, where he settled with the help of Jewish aid organizations and the SPSL. In 1933–34 he gave lectures at the Courtauld Institute of the University of London. He then worked as a freelance art expert and consultant. He played a seminal role in the early stage of the Census of Antique Works of Art and Architecture Known in the Renaissance at the Warburg Institute in London. In the 1930s Scharf assisted the Rubens scholar Ludwig Burchard in an effort to trace Renaissance and Baroque representations of antiquities and record them on index cards. This project directly inspired Fritz Saxl and Richard Krautheimer in their formulation of the Census project in the 1940s. He also worked for the National Art Collection Fund. In 1946 he was naturalized as a British citizen.

In the spring of 1940, the Reichsicherheitshauptamt in Berlin placed him on the special search list GB due to his expertise as an art historian. This was a list of persons who, in the event of a successful invasion and occupation of the British Isles by the Wehrmacht, should be identified and arrested with particular priority. Further detail may be found on this aspect of his life, and others, in an episode of the BBC programme 'Fake or Fortune?' https://www.youtube.com/watch?v=Sjdu1qiN93I Following the end of the Second World War, he continued his work as a consultant, and also as an art dealer.

Scharf's focus was on Italian painting of the fifteenth century, Dutch and Flemish painting of the 17th century, as well as drawings and graphics from the 15th to the 18th century.

== Personal life ==
In 1928, Scharf married Felicie Radziejewski (1901–1991), a native of Berlin, who later was active as an art dealer in London, with whom he had one daughter;

- Ursula Scharf (born 1930), married to David Price, had two children; Martin Price (born 1957) and Stephanie "Steffie" Price (born 1958)

Scharf passed away 20 December 1965 in London, United Kingdom aged 65.

== Selected publications ==
- Beiträge zur Geschichte des Bühnenbildes vom fünfzehnten bis zum Ende des siebzehnten Jahrhunderts, Freiburg 1925 (Dissertation)
- Literaturberichte über die italienische Malerei des 15. Jahrhunderts, in: Zeitschrift Kunstgeschichte 1, 1932.
- Mitarbeit: Gustav Glück Gesammelte Aufsätze. Hrsg. v. Ludwig Burchard und Robert Eigenberger, Wien 1933.
- Mitarbeit an: Rembrandt. Handzeichnungen, Bd. 2, Hrsg. v. Wilhelm Reinhold Valentiner, 1933.
- Die frühen Gemälde des Raffaellino del Garbo, in: Jahrbuch der Preußischen Kunstsammlungen 54, 1933, pp. 151–166.
- Little-known Drawings by Rubens, in: Connoisseur 92, 1933, pp. 249–255.
- Neues zu Bacchiacca, in: Festschrift für Walter Friedlaender zum 60. Geburtstag. 1933.
- Tondi von Filippino Lippi, in: Pantheon, 1933, pp. 329–335.
- Zur Kunst des Francesco Pesellino, in: Pantheon, 14, 1934, pp. 211–220.
- Filippino Lippi, Wien 1935.
- Ruben's Portraits of Charles V and Isabella, in: Burlington Magazine 66, 1935, S. 259–266.
- Dutch and Flemish Painting at the Brussels, Amsterdam and Rotterdam Exhibitions, in: Connoisseur 1935 II, S. 247–255.
- Noch eine unbekannte Voltairebüste von Houdon, in: Pantheon 15, 1935, S. 199.
- Note on the Exhibition of Flemish Primitives at Rotterdam, in: Apollo 1936.
- Bacchicacca. A New Contribution in: Burlington Magazine 70, 1837, pp. 60–66.
- Two neglected Works by Fillippino Lipp, in: Burlington Magazine 71, 1937, pp. 4–7.
- Giorgione in the Light of New Research, in: Apollo 29, 1939, pp. 287–289.
- Luca Signorelli. Study of a Young Warrior, in: O.M. Drawings 14, 1939–1940, p. 50.
- The Massacre of Innocents by G.M. Cresp, in: Burlington Magazine 77, 1940, p. 3f.
- The Devonshire Collection, in: Burlington Magazine 90, 1948, pp. 354–357.
- Notes on the High Altar from Sta. Maria Novella at Florence, in: Burlington Magazine 91, 1948, pp. 214–217.
- mit Rosy Schilling: Zürich, Kunstschätze der Lombardei. Ausstellung im Kunsthaus, in: Phoebus 2, 1948–49, pp. 181–191.
- De Verzameling Devonshire te Londen tentoongesteld, in: Maandblad voor beeldende kunsten 25, 1949, pp. 65–69.
- Once more Monsú, in: Architectural Review 105, 1949.
- The Fantastic Visions of Monsú Desiderio, 1950.
- Francesco Desiderio, in: Burlington Magazine 92, 1950, pp. 18–22
- A Catalogue of Pictures and Drawings from the Collection of Sir Thomas Merton, 1950.
- The Rovinson Collection, in: Burlington Magazine 100, 1958, pp. 299–304.
- Raphael and the Getty Madonna, in: Apollo 79, 1964, pp. 114–121.
