= Northam Memorial Chapel and Gallup Memorial Gateway =

Historic site in Hartford County, Connecticut

- U.S. National Register of Historic Places
- U.S. Historic district – Contributing property
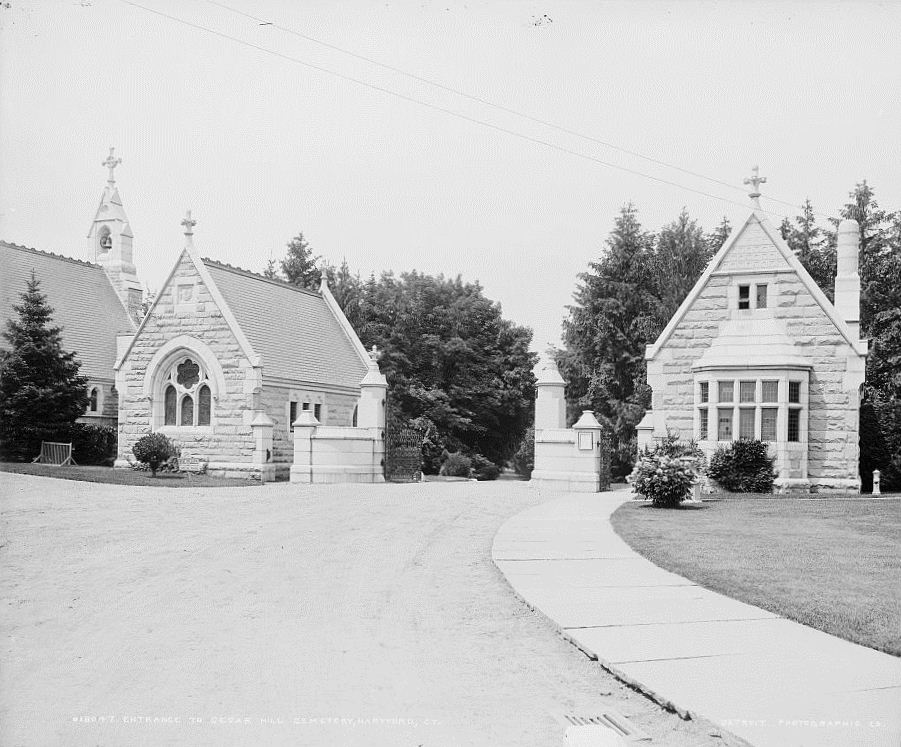

- Location within Connecticut Location within the United States
- Location: 453 Fairfield Avenue, Hartford, Connecticut
- Coordinates: 41°43′36″N 72°41′30″W
- Area: less than one acre
- Built: 1882
- Architect: George Keller
- Architectural style: Gothic Revival
- Part of: Cedar Hill Cemetery (ID97000333)
- NRHP reference No.: 82004428

Significant dates
- Added to NRHP: June 29, 1982
- Designated CP: April 28, 1997

Northam Memorial Chapel and Gallup Memorial Gateway, also known as Cedar Hill Chapel and Gateway, are a historic chapel and gateway in the Cedar Hill Cemetery at 453 Fairfield Avenue in Hartford, Connecticut, USA. Although not part of that cemetery's original rural cemetery design, they are a prominent work of architect George Keller, designed in 1882 and completed in 1889. The Gothic Revival structures were listed on the National Register of Historic Places in 1982.

== Description and history ==
Cedar Hill Cemetery is located in southwestern Hartford, with its boundaries extending into neighboring Newington. The cemetery was laid out in 1866 in a variant of the then-fashionable rural cemetery style. The main cemetery entrance is in Hartford, at the junction of Fairfield and Maple Avenues. The roadway is flanked by a stone gateway. The gateway consists of a two-leaf gate with columns and curved flanking walls, and is flanked by a small waiting room on the left side of the gate and an office building of similar scale to the right. The granite for these structures and the adjacent chapel was quarried in Westerly, Rhode Island.

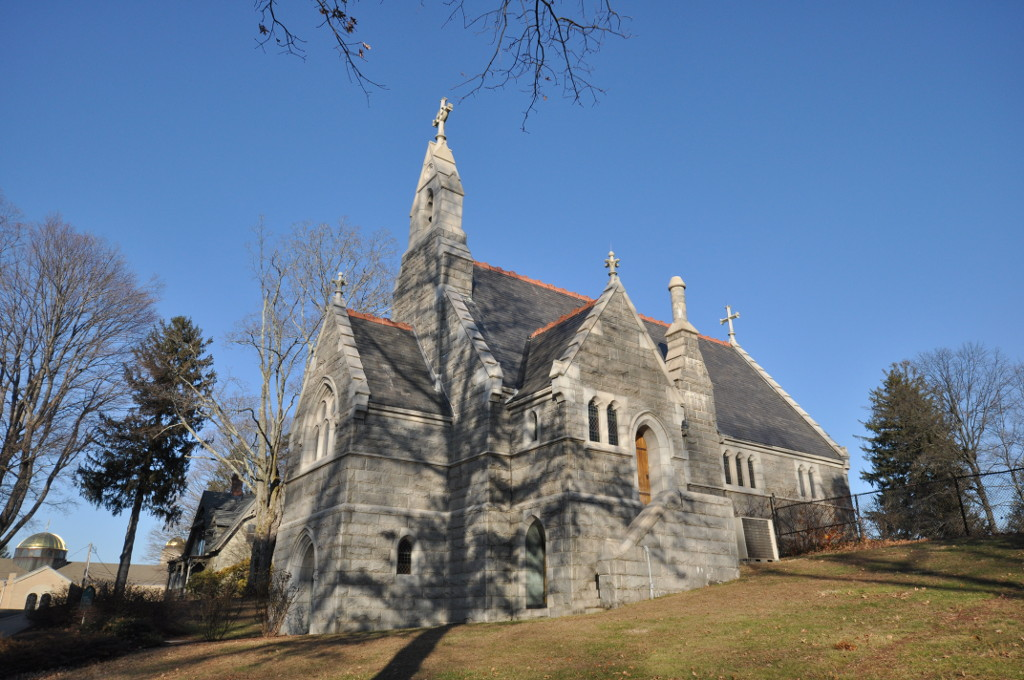
The chapel, 2018

Immediately to the left of these structures stands the Northam Memorial Chapel. It is a Gothic Revival stone structure, with a slate roof and a small bell tower. The interior of the chapel has a polychrome tile floor, cherry pews, and a series of large exposed wooden trusses supporting the roof. The chancel arch and other trim elements are red sandstone.

The chapel was designed by George Keller and built in 1882, funded by gifts from the Charles Northam, a West Indies merchant, and other members of his family. This complex was built in 1889, and named in honor of Julia Gallup, wife of David Gallup, a local businessman, banker, and judge. This collection of buildings form a cohesive and complementary addition to the rural cemetery design of Jacob Weidenmann, who laid out Cedar Hill Cemetery.

== See also ==
- National Register of Historic Places listings in Hartford, Connecticut
