= Soldiers and Sailors Memorial Arch =

War memorial in Hartford, Connecticut

Coordinates: 41.76566°N 72.68000°W

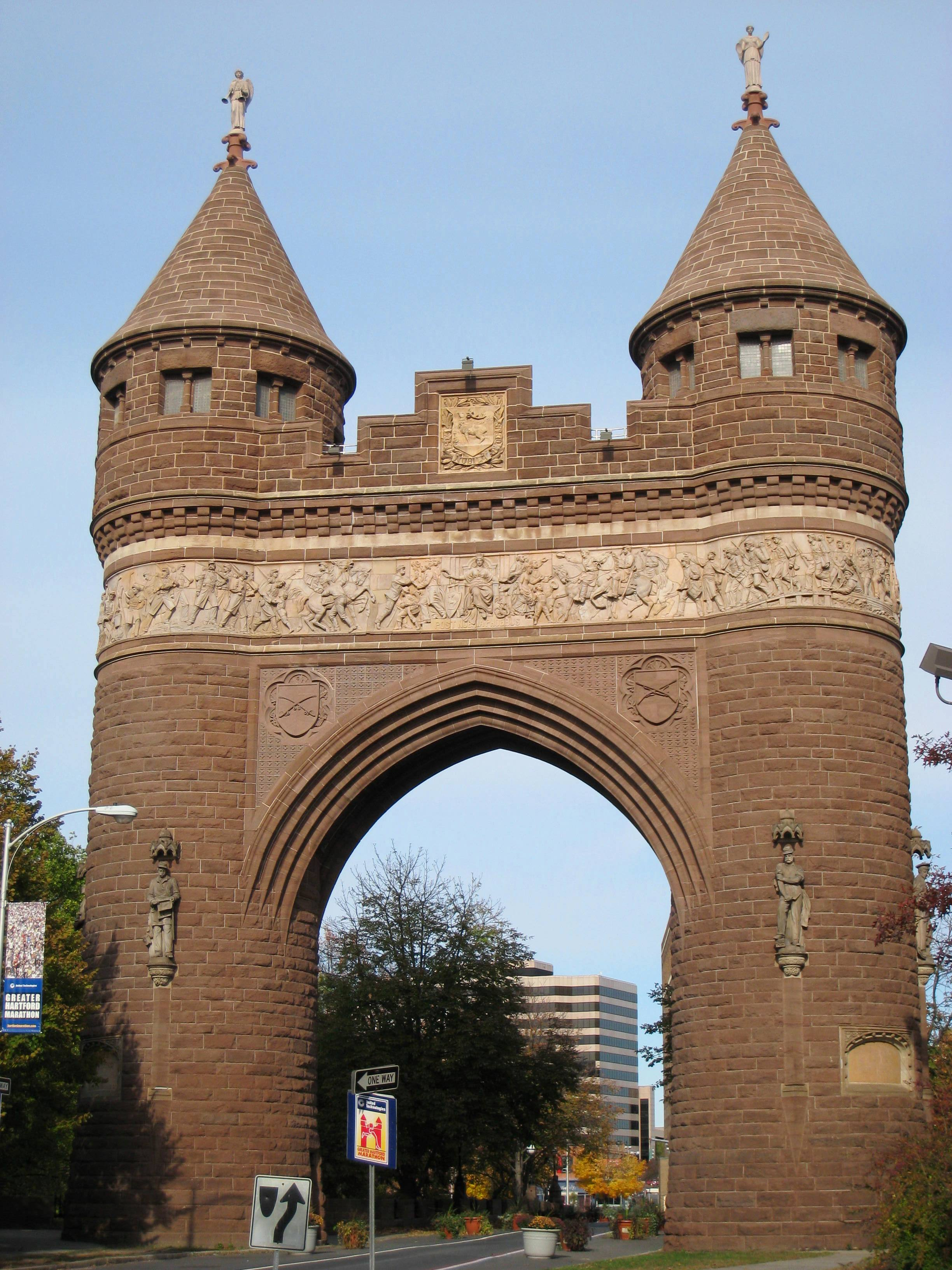
Soldiers and Sailors Memorial Arch, south face

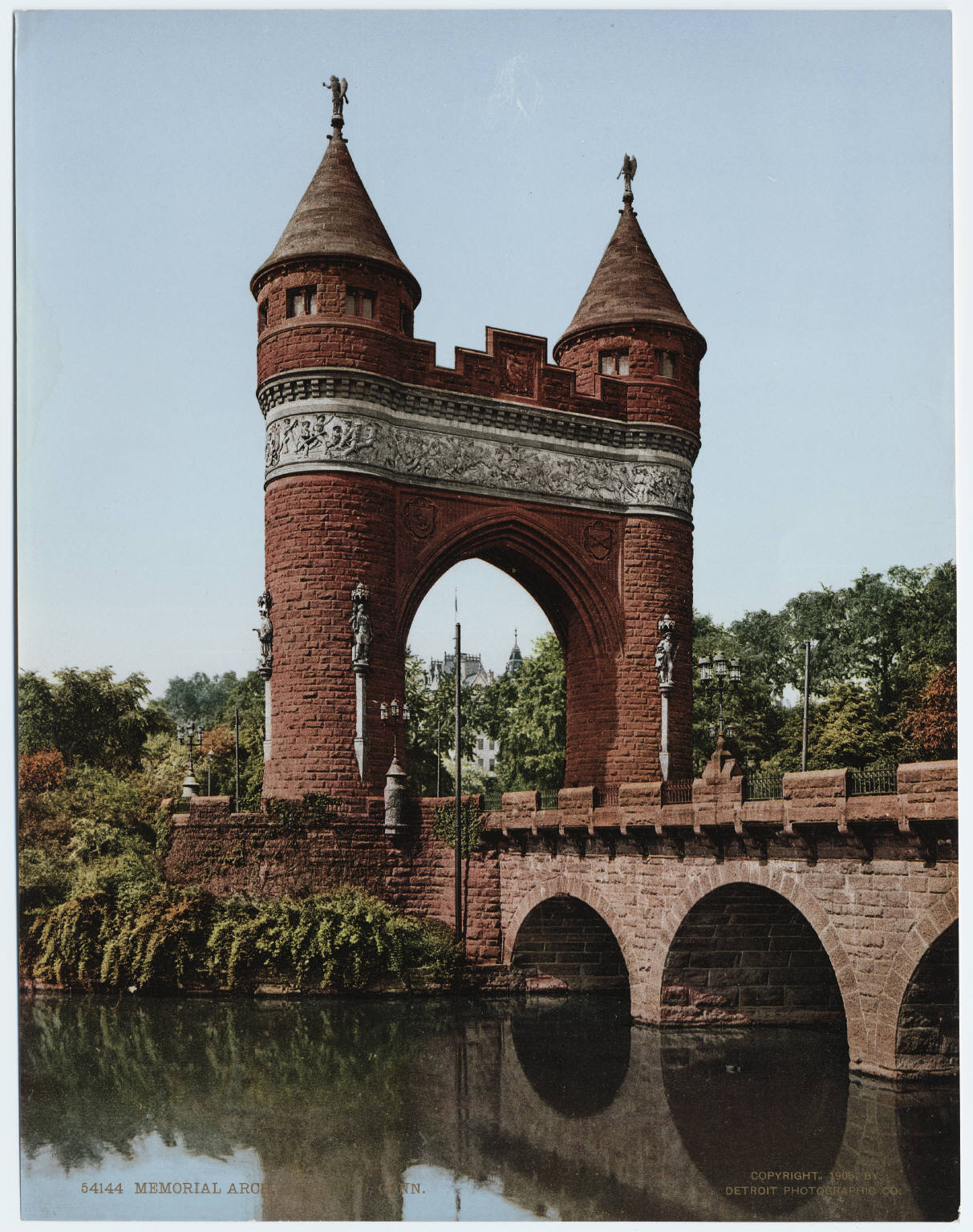
Photochrom of the Soldiers and Sailors Memorial Arch ca. 1905

The Soldiers and Sailors Memorial Arch in Bushnell Park, Hartford, Connecticut, honors the 4,000 Hartford citizens who served in the American Civil War, including 400 who died for the Union cause. It is notable as the first permanent memorial arch to be built in America.

== History ==
The arch's conception dates from October 21, 1879, when a committee formed to sponsor a competition (held in 1881). The committee declined to approve any of the winning schemes and in 1884 awarded the commission to the Hartford-based architect George Keller. He produced an eclectic design with two Norman towers flanking a Gothic arch, decorated with a classical frieze, embellished with statues modeled by the Swiss-born sculptor Albert Entress (1846–1926). The arch, built with brownstone from Portland, Connecticut, was completed in 1886 at a cost of about $60,000, and dedicated on September 17, 1886.

The north frieze, by Samuel James Kitson, tells a story of war with (on the right) a figure of General Ulysses S. Grant surveying his troops and (on the left) marines leaping from a boat to rush Confederate troops. The south frieze, by Caspar Buberl, tells a story of peace. The central female allegorical figure represents the City of Hartford, surrounded by her citizens welcoming their soldiers home. The Boston Terra Cotta Company fabricated the frieze.

The four military services are symbolized in the spandrels: an anchor for the Navy; a crossed cannon for the Artillery; crossed sabers for the Cavalry; and crossed rifles for the Infantry. Six sculptural figures, each eight feet tall, adorn the towers: farmer, blacksmith, mason, student, carpenter and an African-American breaking his chains of bondage. Angels in the form of finials cap the towers, one a trumpeter, the other a cymbalist, both facing south to welcome the returning troops. During the restoration of 1986–1988, the original terra cotta angels were removed and replaced with copies in bronze.

The ashes of architect Keller and his wife Mary are interred in the memorial.

== Inscriptions ==
A tablet on the southeast tower is inscribed:

IN HONOR
OF THE MEN OF HARTFORD
WHO SERVED
AND IN MEMORY OF THOSE WHO FELL
ON LAND AND ON SEA
IN THE WAR FOR THE UNION
THEIR GRATEFUL TOWNSMEN
HAVE RAISED THIS MEMORIAL

The southwest tablet is inscribed:

DURING THE CIVIL WAR
1861–1865
MORE THAN 4,000 MEN OF HARTFORD
BORE ARMS IN THE NATIONAL CAUSE
NEARLY 400 OF WHOM
DIED IN THE SERVICE
ERECTED 1885
GEORGE KELLER, ARCHITECT
CASPER BUBERL & SAMUEL KITSON SCULPTORS
BOSTON
TERRA COTTA CO

== Gallery ==
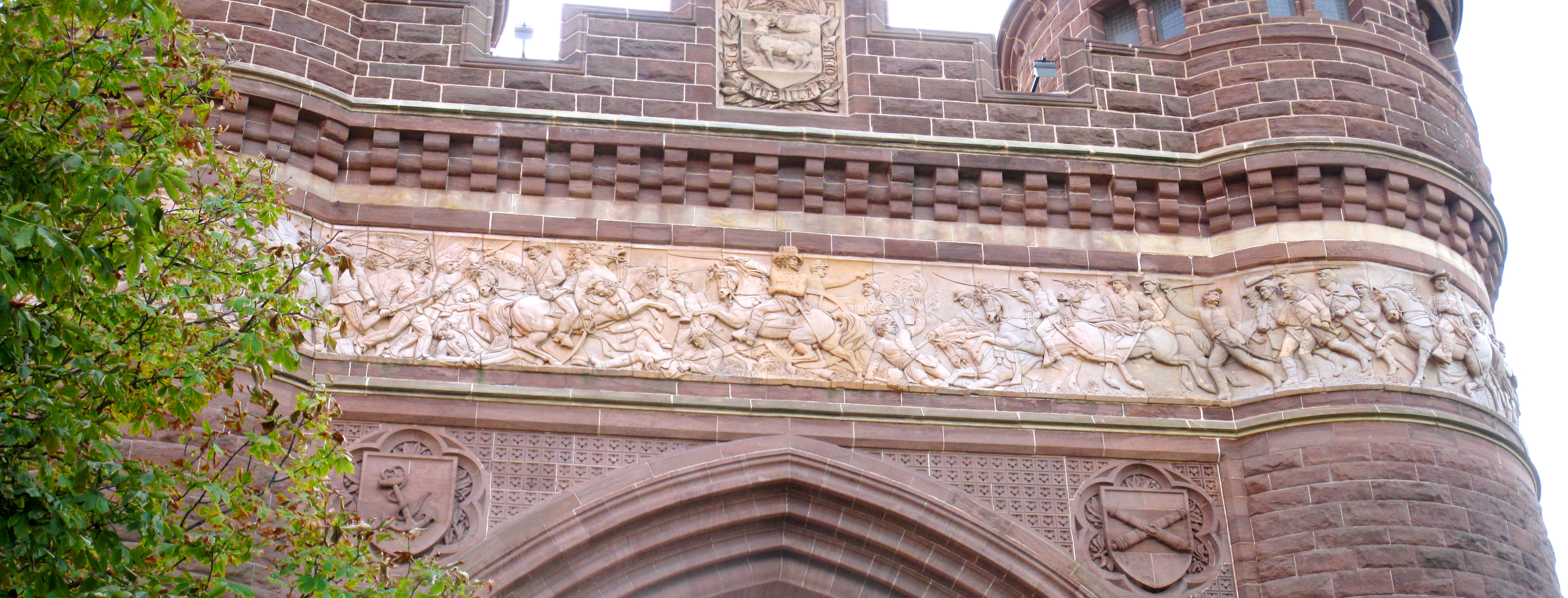
North frieze.

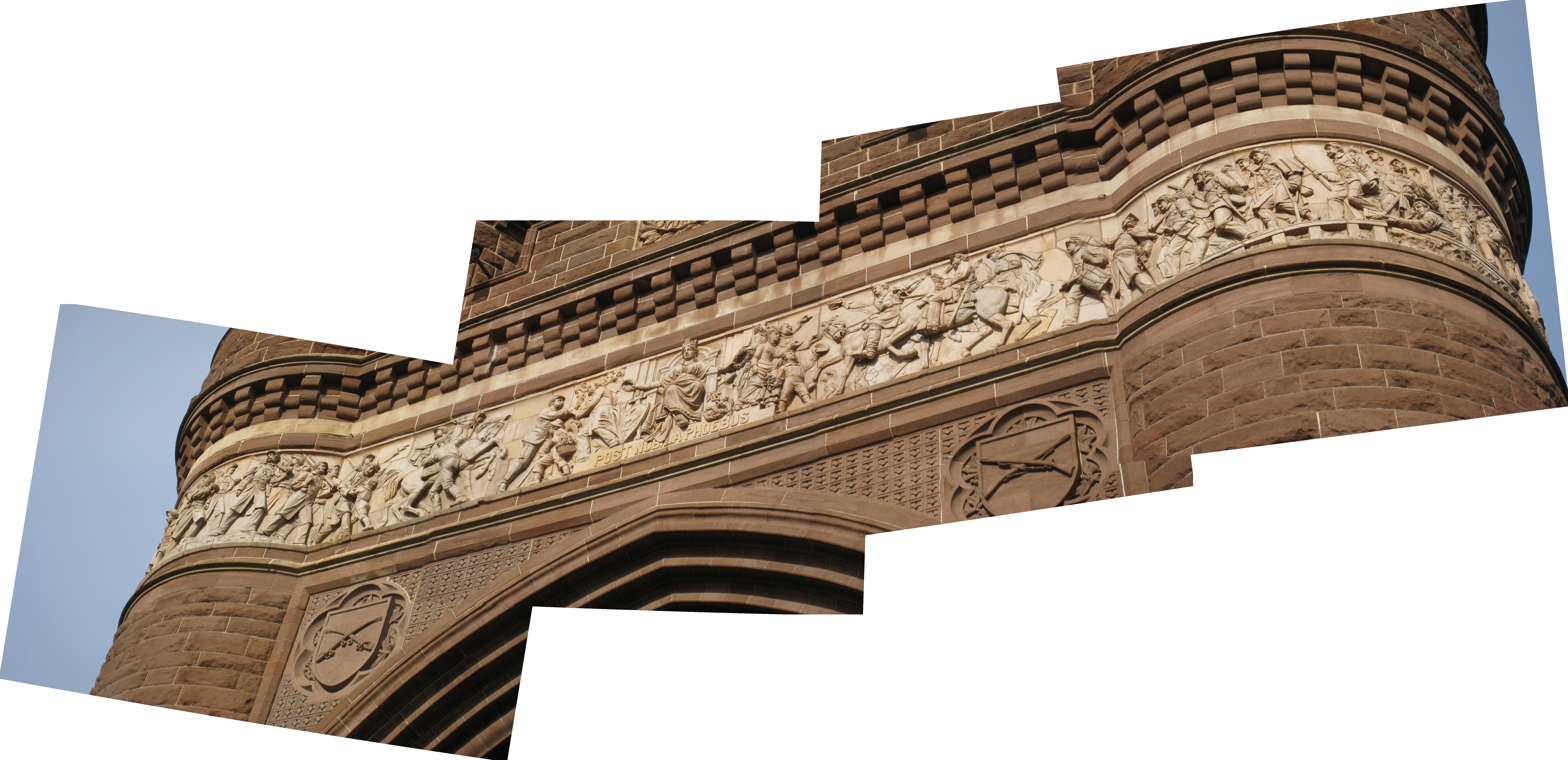
South frieze.

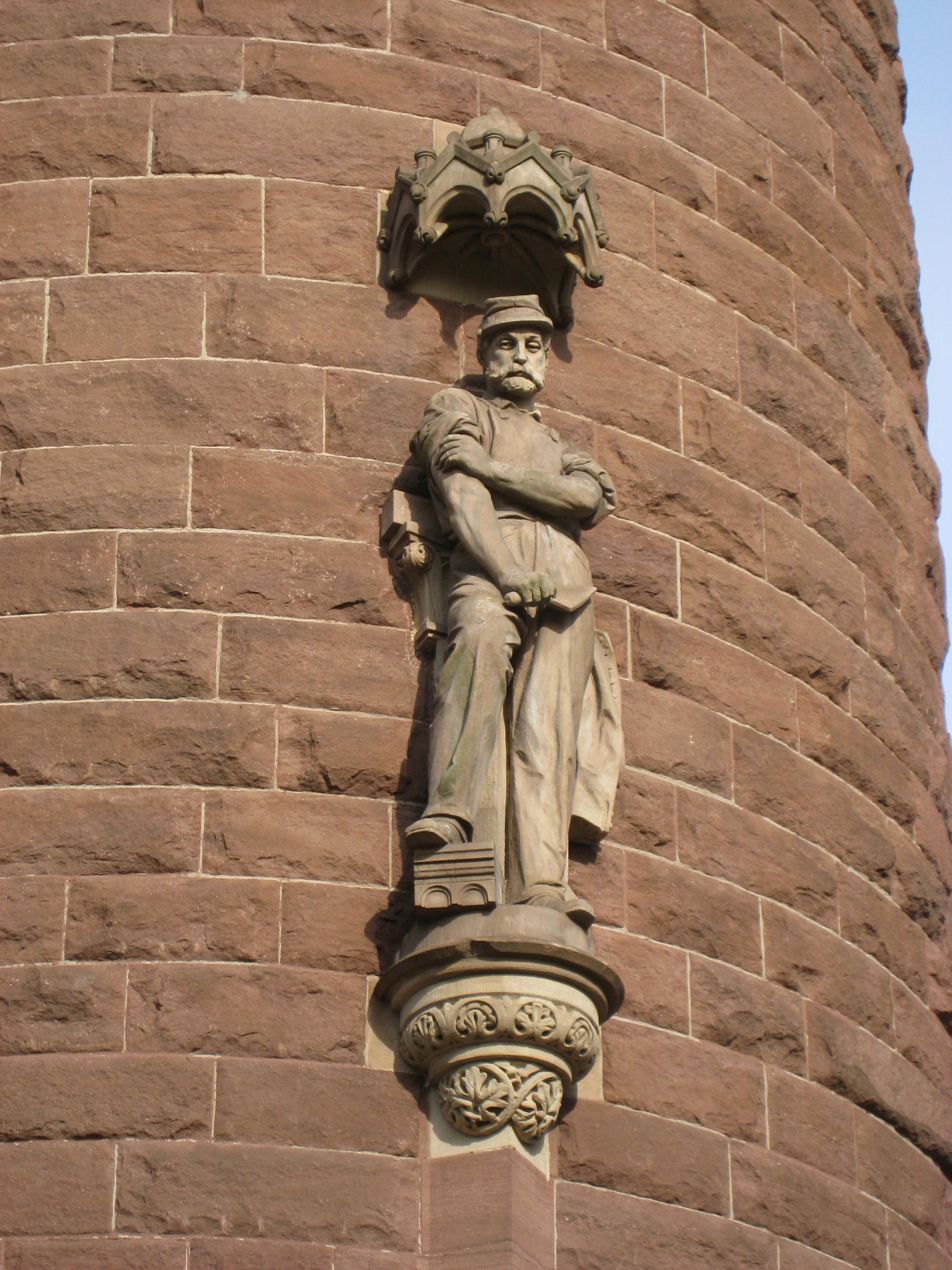
The Mason.

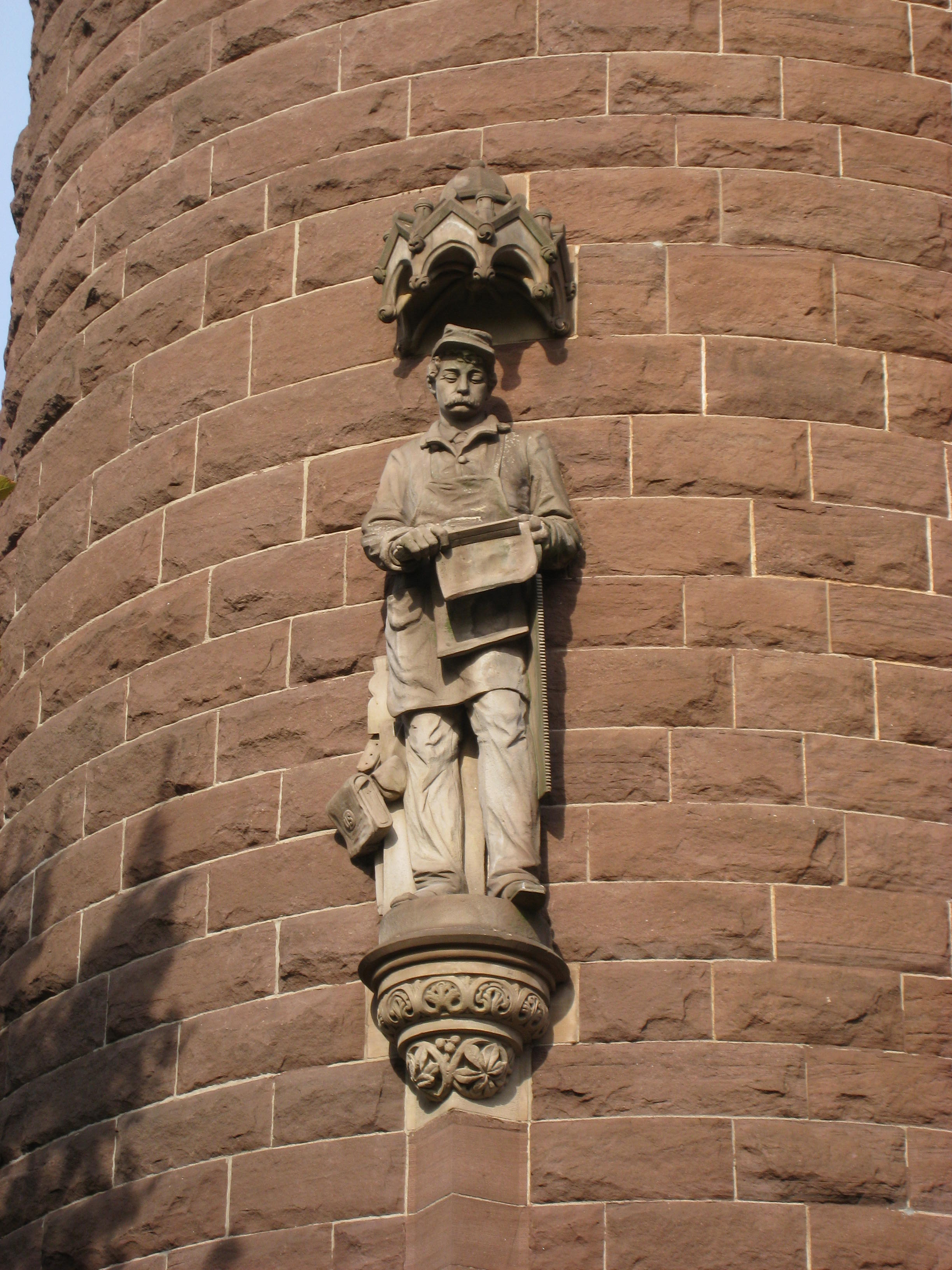
The Carpenter.

The Blacksmith

The Farmer
