= George Keller (architect) =

American architect

George Keller, circa 1880

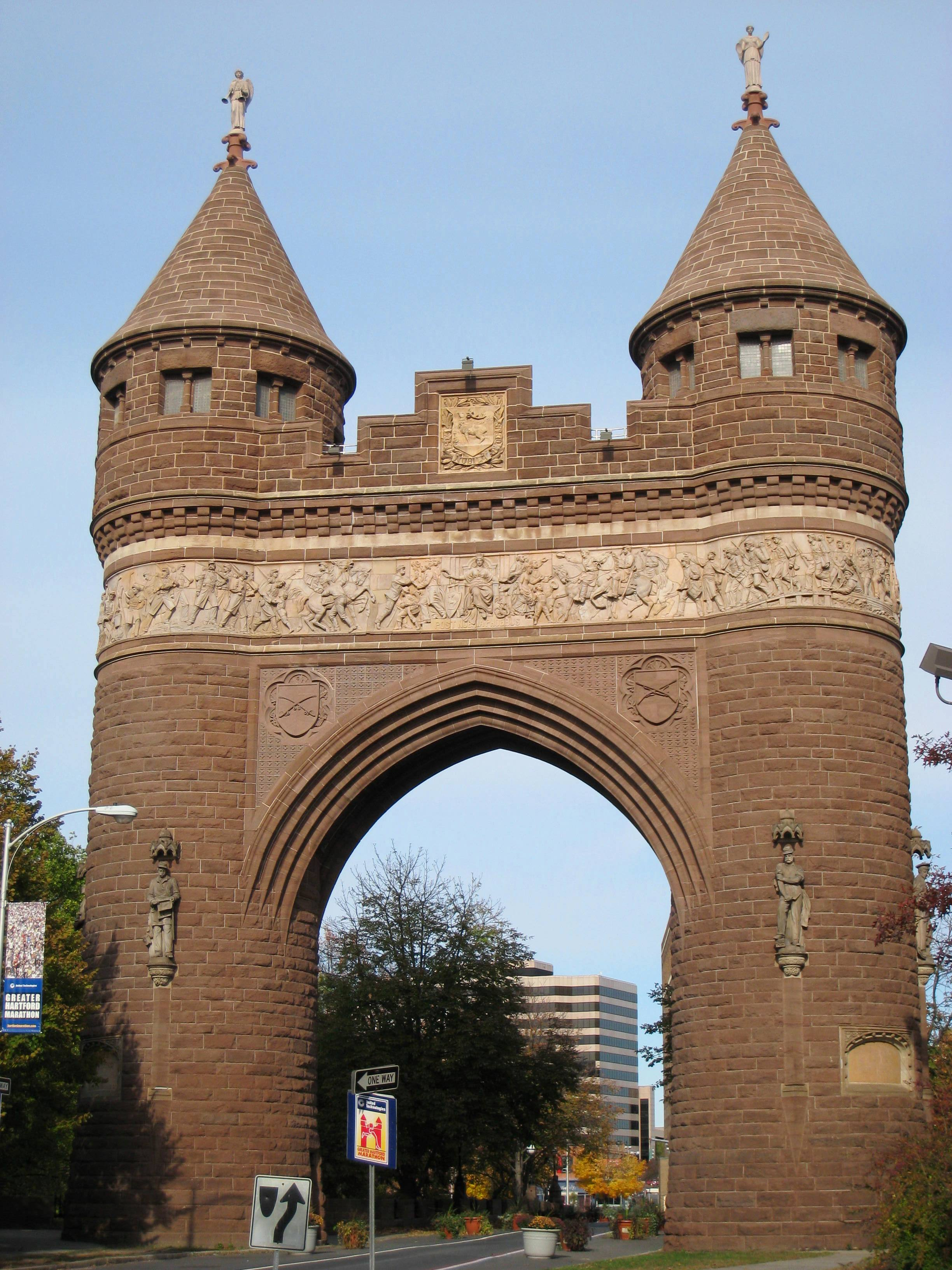
Soldiers and Sailors Memorial Arch, Hartford, Connecticut (1884–86), south side. Keller's ashes are interred within the Memorial Arch.

George Keller (December 15, 1842 – July 7, 1935) was an American architect and engineer. He enjoyed a diverse and successful career, and was sought for his designs of bridges, houses, monuments, and various commercial and public buildings. Keller's most famous projects, however, are the Soldiers and Sailors Memorial Arch in Hartford, Connecticut, and the James A. Garfield Memorial in Cleveland, Ohio.

== Biography ==
He was born on December 15, 1842, in Cork in Ireland to Thomas Keller and Susan Pratt. Keller emigrated with his family to New York City as a child. Irish immigrants were at the time considered inferior, and during his early years Keller endured a considerable measure of hardship and discrimination. Lacking connections and unable to obtain schooling in Europe like many of his professional peers, an ambitious nature and a school of hard knocks education gave Keller an adequate base of knowledge. As a young man, he accepted employment with an Irish architect in Washington, D.C., but returned to New York to join the firm of architect Peter B. Wight. This was the beginning of a lifelong friendship between the two. Keller's association with Wight introduced him to the aesthetic philosophy of John Ruskin and to serious architectural study, which was cut short by the outbreak of the Civil War. Though Keller planned to join the Union Army, a dry inkwell prevented him from signing the enlistment papers. Choosing to see this as an ill omen, he gladly accepted an engineering position with the Brooklyn Navy Yard instead. Moving to Hartford at the war's end, he took a job designing monuments.

In 1903 Keller became the 3rd architect to work on the Christ Church Cathedral in Hartford. He based his contribution to the design on the York Cathedral, from which Ithiel Town, the original architect, had drawn inspiration.

== Public monuments ==
=== Soldiers and Sailors Memorial Arch ===
The postwar building boom brought Keller to national prominence. Though he won design competitions for Civil War monuments in several cities, his Soldiers and Sailors Memorial Arch at the entrance to Bushnell Park in Hartford, Connecticut, boldly broke the conventional form that had become the accepted configuration. Monuments of this type typically consisted of a cylindrical column, or shaft, surmounted by an allegorical female figure, usually Victory, with four sculpted figures surrounding the base. In contrast, Keller's Hartford monument, an eclectic Romanesque construction dedicated in 1886, was "perhaps the first permanent triumphal arch in the United States." One of the arch's most striking elements is a bas-relief frieze featuring life-size figures carved by Bohemian-born sculptor Caspar Buberl. The north side of the frieze was carved by English-born sculptor Samuel James Kitson.

The Memorial Arch was built as a gateway to the pre-existing Park River Bridge, which was renamed the Soldiers and Sailors Memorial Bridge. The bridge remains although the river has since been relocated and capped. The upper portion of the bridge arches can still be seen even though the river bank has since been raised and turned into parkland.

=== Garfield Memorial ===
Keller's involvement with the James A. Garfield Memorial in Cleveland began after he submitted an architectural design to the trustees of the Garfield National Memorial Committee. The committee, headed by ex-President Rutherford B. Hayes along with Jeptha H. Wade, president of Cleveland's Lake View Cemetery, had been formed for the purpose of securing a plan for a memorial to President James A. Garfield following his assassination in 1881. To this end during the autumn of 1883 the committee sponsored a design competition in which Keller took part. The competition promised a prize of $1,000 to the winning design, thus attracting not only American but also European entries. To judge the submissions, the committee obtained the assistance of Boston architect Henry van Brunt and English-born architect Calvert Vaux of New York City. Both van Brunt and Vaux ultimately chose Keller's design, and he was awarded the commission on June 24, 1884. Excavation for the monument at Lake View Cemetery began on October 6, 1885; it was dedicated on Memorial Day, May 30, 1890. Once again, Keller chose Caspar Buberl to execute figural friezes for his design.

== Selected works ==
Monument	Image	Location/GPS coordinates	Construction begun	Cornerstone laid	Dedicated	Sculptor	Notes
Civil War Monument		Granby Green, 3 East Granby Road, Granby, Connecticut; 41.9536°N 72.7891°W			1868	Carl Conrads	New England Granite Works, contractor
Soldiers' National Monument		Gettysburg National Cemetery, Gettysburg, Pennsylvania; 39.8198°N 77.2312°W		July 3, 1865	July 1, 1869	Randolph Rogers	
Soldiers Monument		Taunton, Massachusetts					Never executed
Civil War Monument		Veterans Memorial Park, Manchester, New Hampshire; 42.9885°N 71.4619°W		May 30, 1878	September 11, 1879	Caspar Buberl and others	
U.S. Soldier Monument a.k.a. Private Soldier Monument		Antietam National Cemetery, Sharpsburg, Maryland; 39.4592°N 77.7411°W		September 17, 1867	September 17, 1880	Carl Conrads, sculptor James W. Pollette, carver	Height: 44 ft 7 in. Weight: 250 tons. Statue exhibited at the 1876 Centennial Exposition.
Soldiers and Sailors Monument		Lafayette Square, Buffalo, New York; 42.8857°N 78.8738°W		July 4, 1882	July 4, 1884	Caspar Buberl	
Soldiers and Sailors Memorial Arch		Bushnell Park (Ford Street entrance), Hartford, Connecticut; 41.7657°N 72.6800°W	May; 1884		November 7, 1886	Caspar Buberl, south frieze Samuel James Kitson, north frieze Albert Entress (1846–1926), 6 statues	
James A. Garfield Memorial		Lake View Cemetery, Cleveland, Ohio; 41.5100°N 81.5914°W	October 6, 1885		May 30, 1890	Caspar Buberl	
Soldiers and Sailors Monument		Oneida Square, Utica, New York; 43.0963°N 75.2422°W			October 13, 1891	Karl Gerhardt	
Major General John Sedgwick Memorial		opposite Cornwall Hollow Cemetery, Cornwall Hollow & Hautboy Hill Roads, Cornwall, Connecticut; 41.8975°N 73.2828°W			May 3, 1900	James J. Hawley (1871–1899)	Hawley's first (and only) major commission.
Base of Lafayette Equestrian Statue		Lafayette Circle, Capitol Avenue & Washington Street, Hartford, Connecticut; 41.7625°N 72.6818°W	1932			Paul Wayland Bartlett	1932 cast of Bartlett's 1908 equestrian statue at Cours la Reine, Paris

== Other buildings ==
- Grace Episcopal Church, Windsor, Connecticut (1864–65).
- Grace Episcopal Church Rectory, 301 Broad Street, Windsor, Connecticut (circa 1865–70), (attributed).
- Asylum Avenue Baptist Church, 868 Asylum Avenue, Hartford, Connecticut (1872, altered). Part of Asylum Avenue Historic District.
- Seyms Street Jail, Hartford, Connecticut (1873, demolished 1978).
- Elizabeth Chapel, Connecticut Retreat for the Insane, Hartford, Connecticut (1875). Now The Institute of Living.
- Temple Beth Israel Synagogue, 21 Charter Oak Avenue, Hartford, Connecticut (1876). Now Charter Oak Cultural Center.
- Carl H. Conrads House, 1628 Boulevard, West Hartford, Connecticut (year?).
- White Hall, Connecticut Retreat for the Insane, Hartford, Connecticut (1877). Now The Institute of Living.
- G. Fox & Company Department Store, 406-10 Main Street, Hartford, Connecticut (1880, burned 1917).
- Northam Memorial Chapel and Gallup Memorial Gateway, Cedar Hill Cemetery, 453 Fairfield Avenue, Hartford, Connecticut (1882).
- Hartford Public High School, 39 Hopkins Street, Hartford, Connecticut (1882, expanded 1897, demolished 1963).
- Thayer Monument, Lake View Cemetery, Skaneateles, New York, 1882–83, Carl Conrads, sculptor.
- Union Station, Hartford, Connecticut (1889), conceived by Keller, executed by Shepley, Rutan and Coolidge.
- Columbia Street Row Houses, Hartford, Connecticut, 12 houses on east side (1888), west side (1889). Part of George Keller Historic District.
- Park Terrace Row Houses, Hartford, Connecticut (1895). Keller received the house at 26 Park Terrace in lieu of his design fee, and lived there for the rest of his life.
- 60 Cone Street, Hartford, Connecticut (1895). Part of West End North Historic District.
- Grace Episcopal Church Parish House, Windsor, Connecticut (1898).
- Simsbury United Methodist Church, 799 Hopmeadow Street, Simsbury, Connecticut (1908).
- Albert Pope Drinking Fountain, Pope Park, Hartford, Connecticut (1913).
- J. P. Morgan Tomb, Cedar Hill Cemetery, Hartford, Connecticut, circa 1913.

=== Libraries ===
Biographer David F. Ransom calls Keller's three small libraries "the crowning achievement of his career."

- Norfolk Public Library, Norfolk, Connecticut (1888–89). Keller doubled the size of the library in 1911, but maintained the domestic scale of its Shingle Style exterior.
- Ansonia Public Library, Ansonia, Connecticut (1891–92).
- Granville Public Library, Granville, Massachusetts (1902).

== Personal ==
Around 1885 he married Mary Monteith Smith (1860–1946) and they had three children: Hilda Montieth Keller (1888–1978), George Monteith Keller Sr. (1895–1986), and Walter Smith Keller Sr. (1898–1981).

George Keller died in Hartford, Connecticut, on July 7, 1935. His ashes and those of his wife are interred within the Memorial Arch.

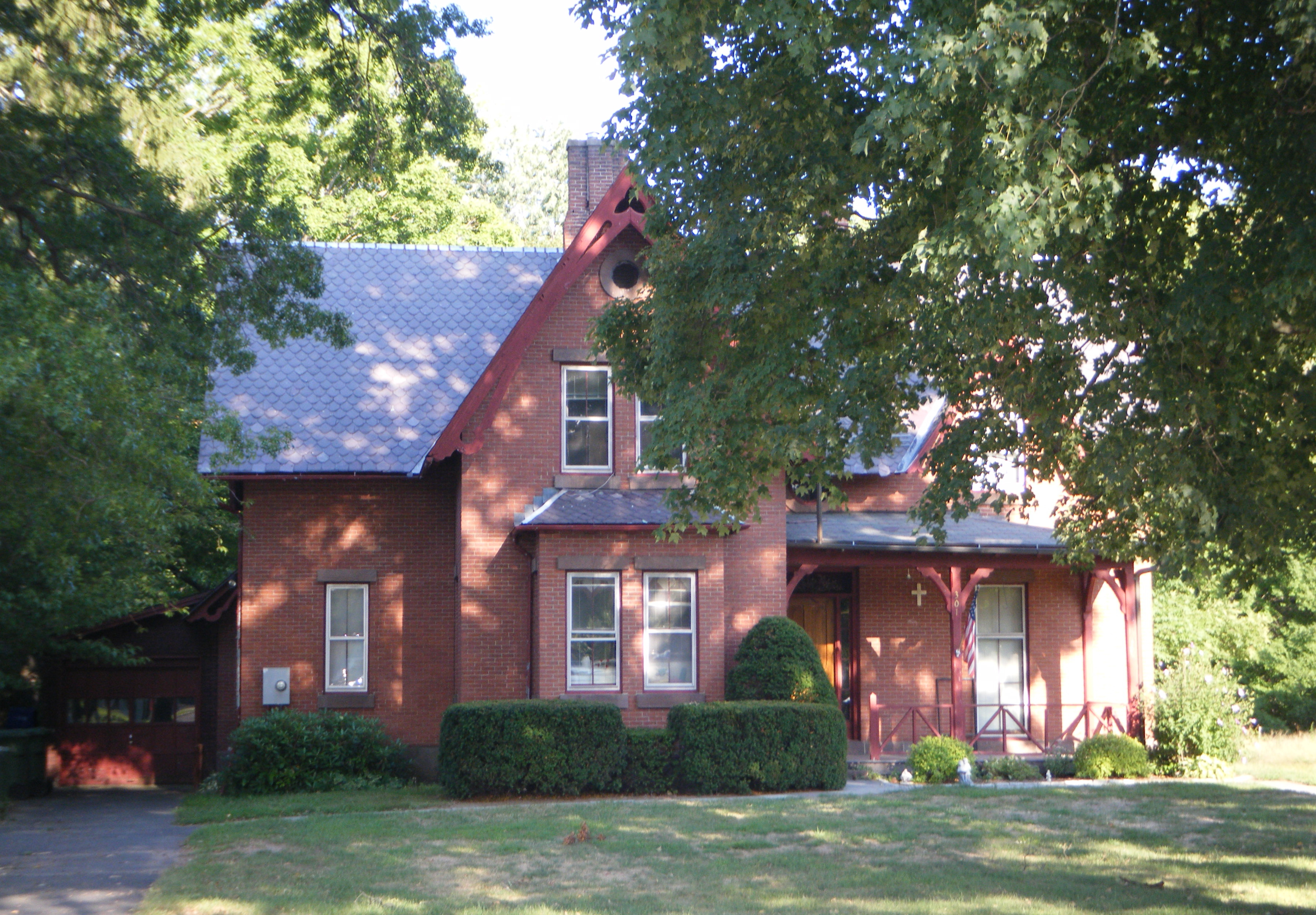
Grace Episcopal Church Rectory, Windsor, Connecticut (c. 1865–70).

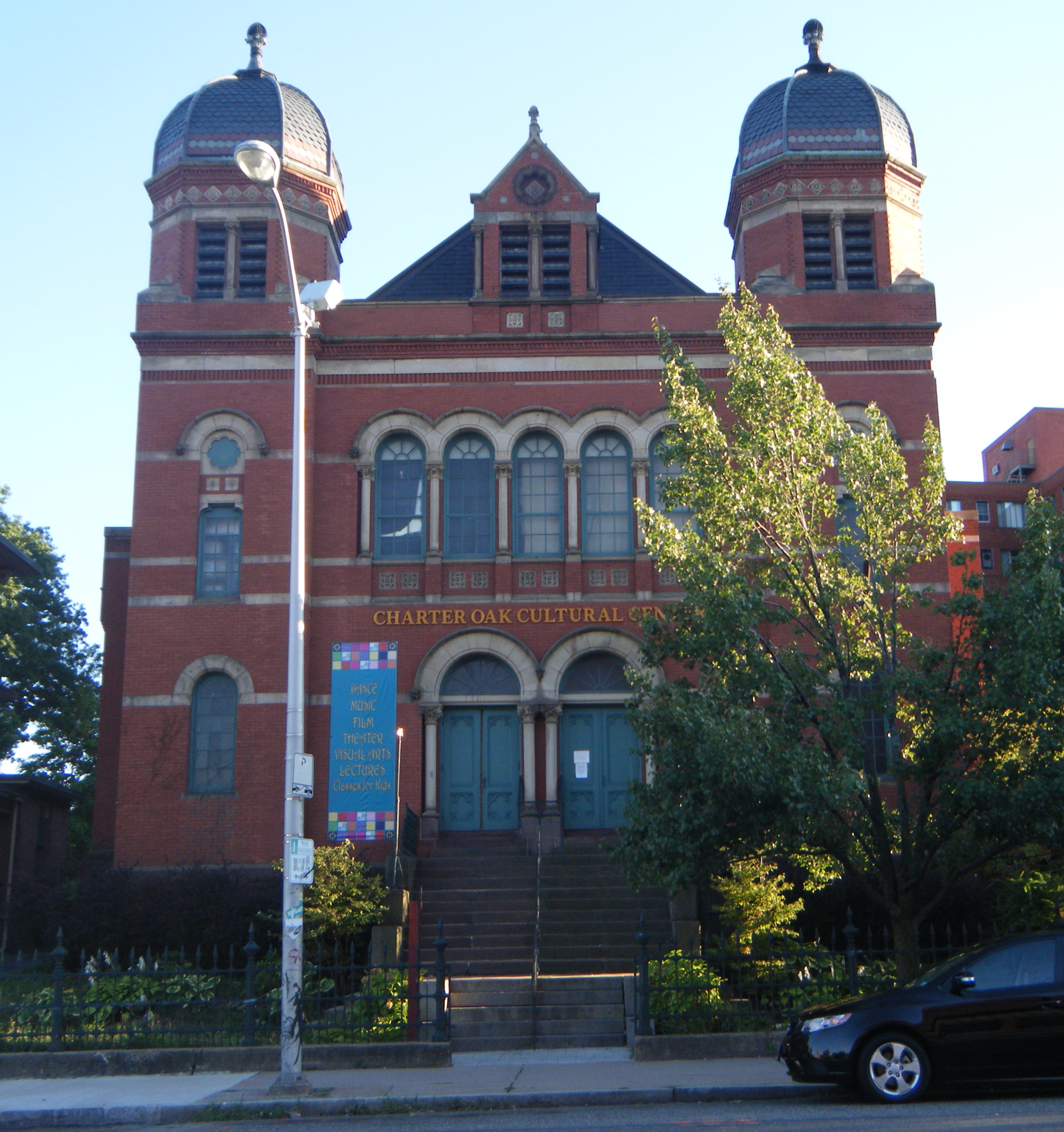
Temple Beth Israel Synagogue, Hartford, Connecticut (1876). Now Charter Oak Cultural Center.

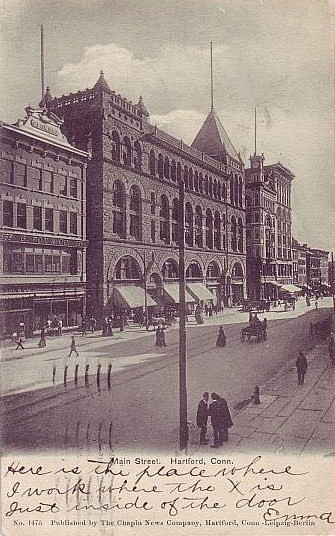
G. Fox & Co. Department Store (far left), Hartford, Connecticut (1880, burned 1917).

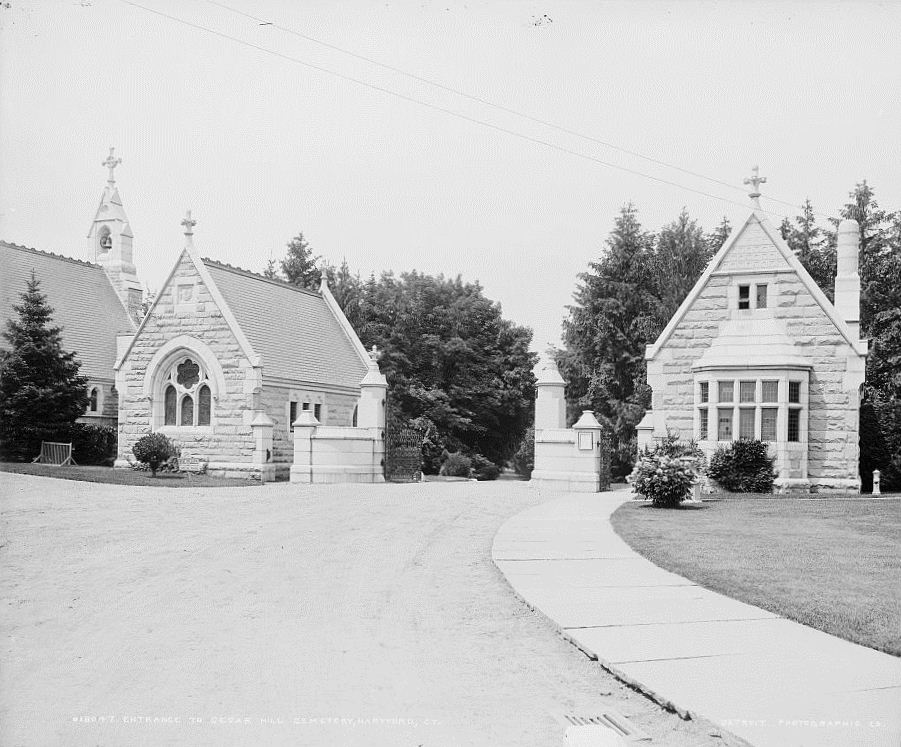
Northam Memorial Chapel and Gallup Memorial Gateway, Cedar Hill Cemetery, Hartford, Connecticut (1882).

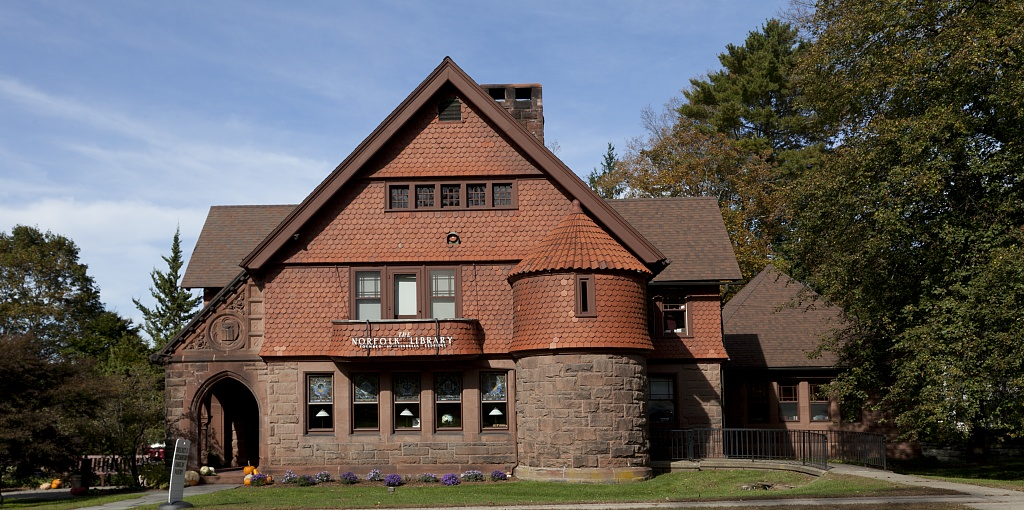
Norfolk Public Library, Norfolk, Connecticut (1888–89).

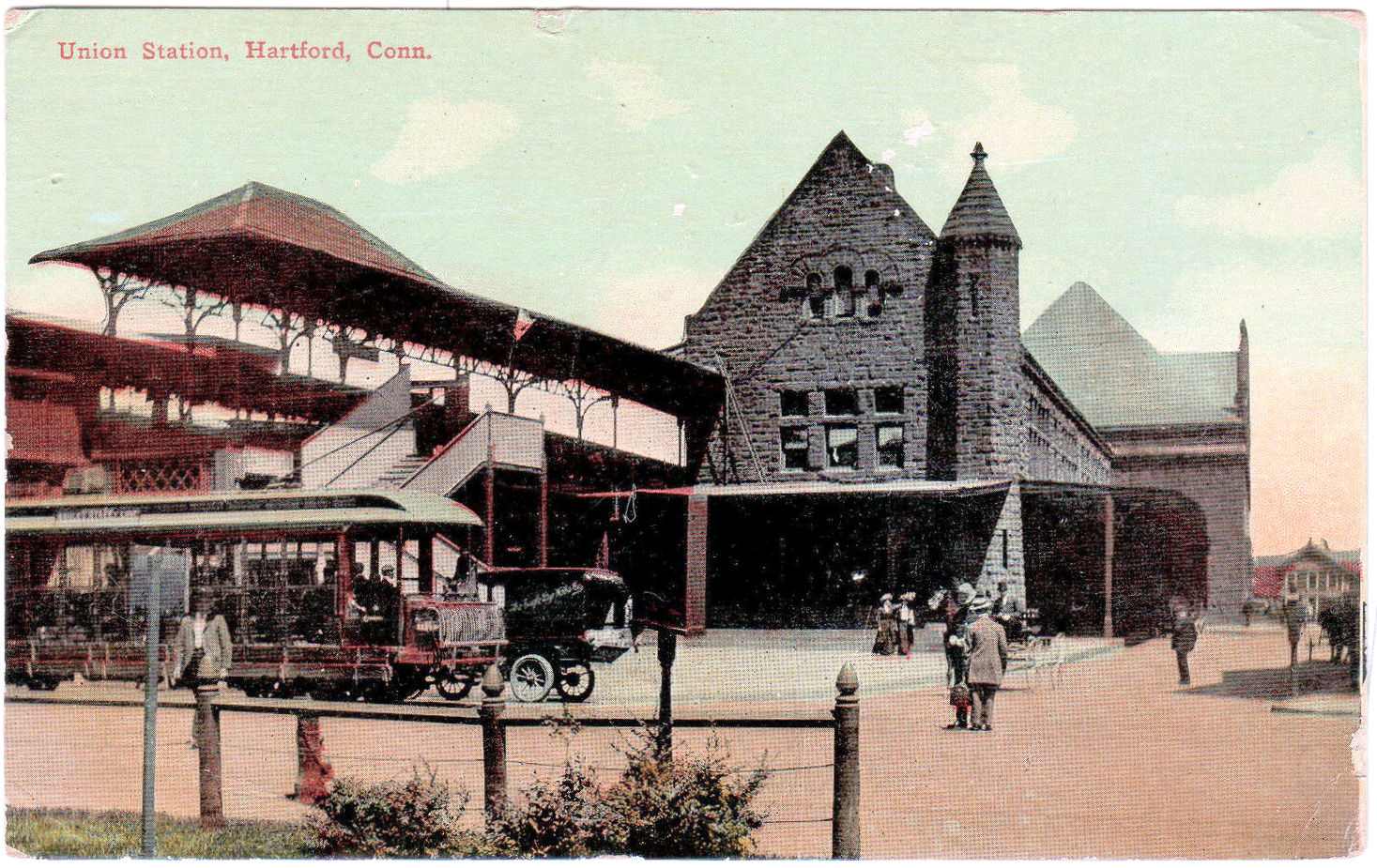
Union Station, Hartford, Connecticut (1889).

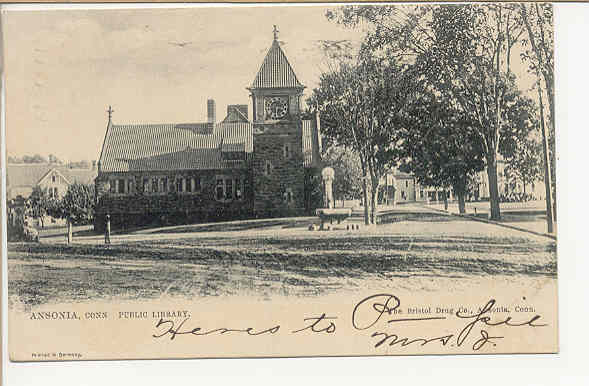
Ansonia Public Library, Ansonia, Connecticut (1891–92).

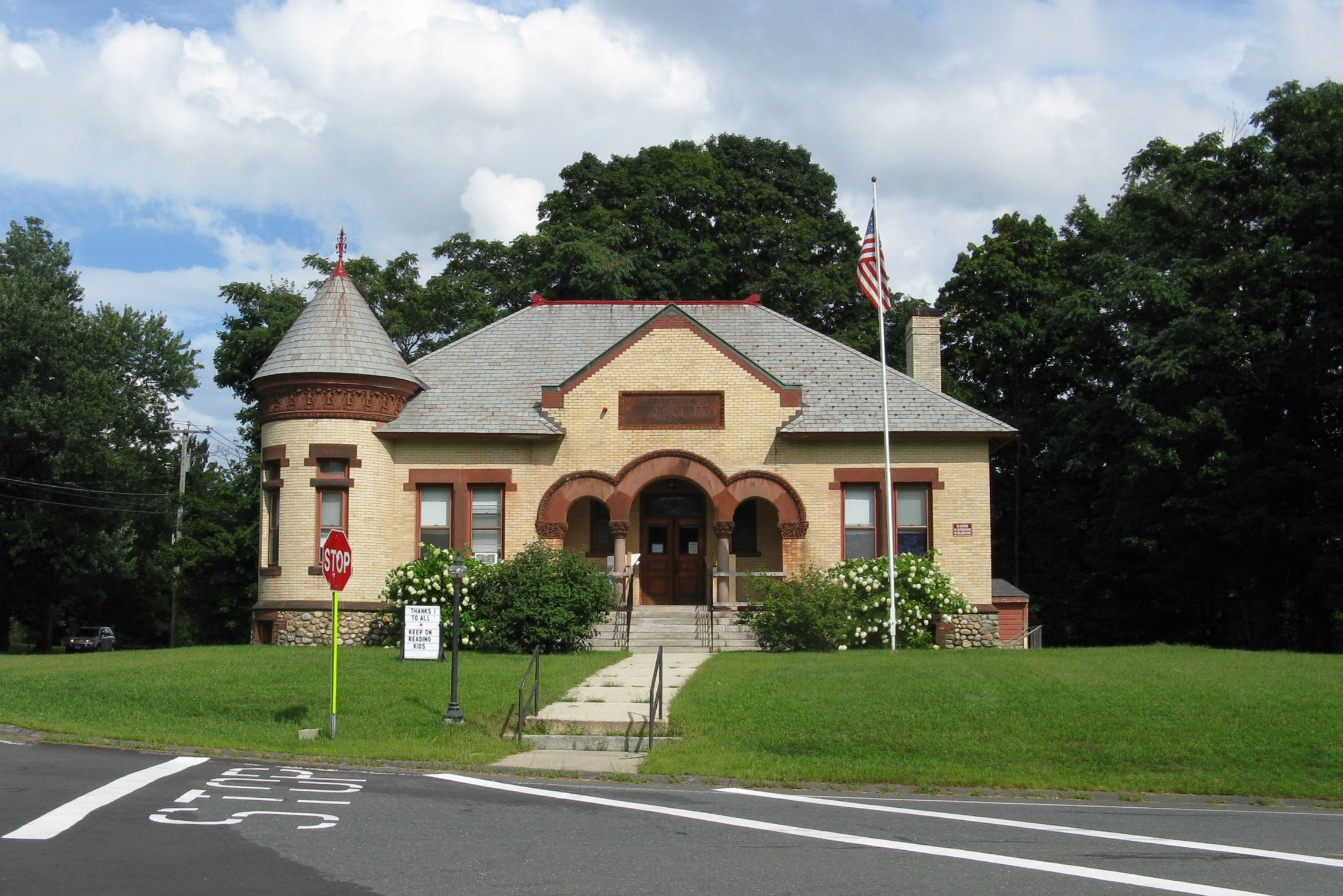
Granville Public Library, Granville, Massachusetts (1902).
