= Howitzer Monument =

Statue formerly in Richmond, Virginia, U.S.

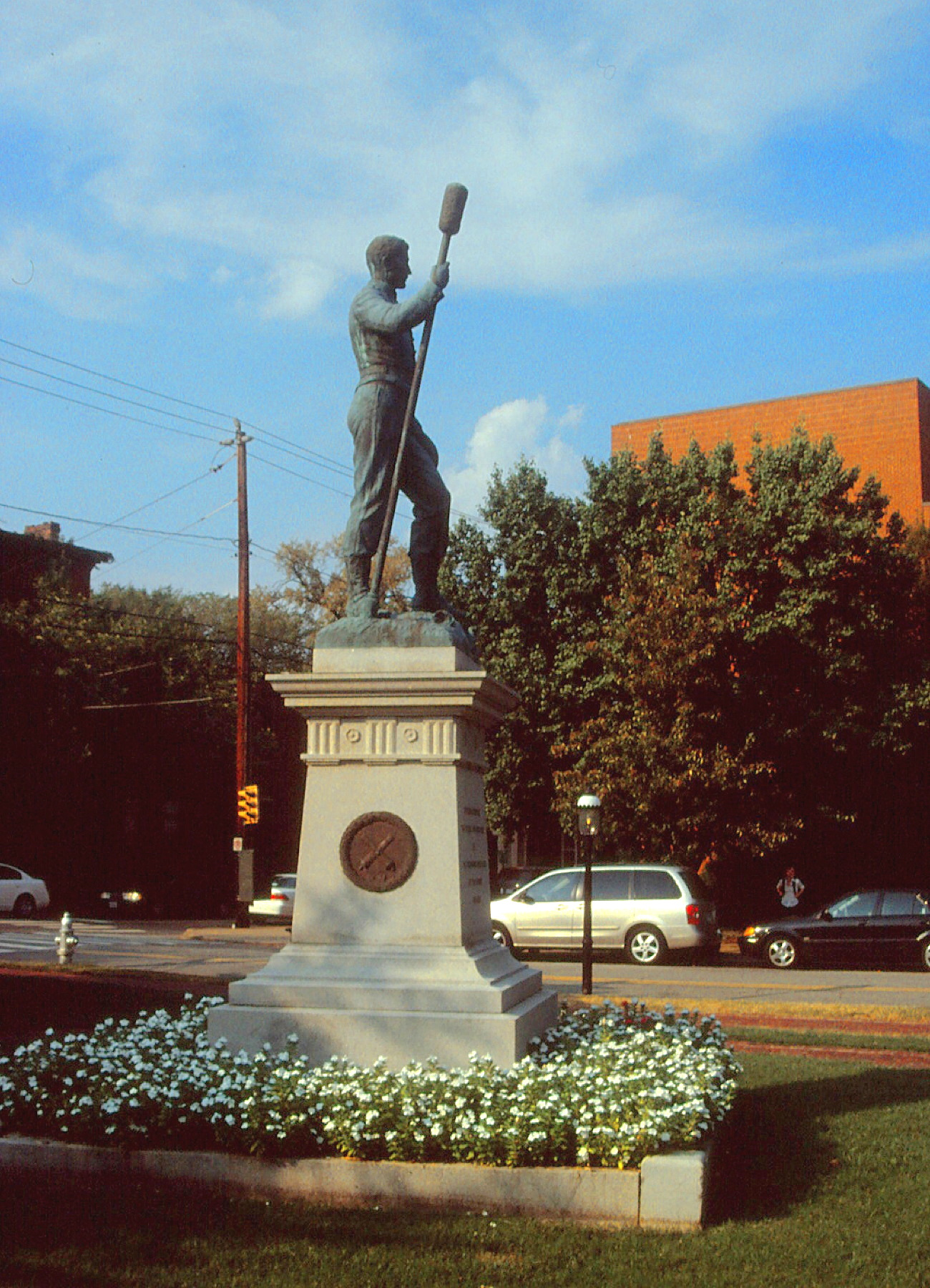
- The monument in 2005
- Artist: Caspar Buberl
- Year: 1892
- Location: Richmond, Virginia, U.S.; 37°32′55″N 77°27′18″W

The Howitzer Monument was installed in Richmond, Virginia, in the United States. It commemorated the Richmond Howitzers, a Confederate artillery unit. The statue was created by Caspar Buberl. It was located on Virginia Commonwealth University's Monroe Park campus.

== History ==
The monument was erected in 1892. In 2020, rioters pulled down the statue.

“The Richmond Howitzer Company of the 1st Regiment of Volunteers was founded on November 9, 1859, by George Wythe Randolph, a grandson of Thomas Jefferson. After electing Randolph its first captain, the company, which was recruited from elite Richmond circles, marched to Charles Town, Virginia (now West Virginia), to help provide security during Brown's trial and subsequent execution. Following the end of the Civil War “the Howitzers reorganized in 1871 and saw active duty during both World War I and World War II. It is now a unit in the Virginia National Guard.

== See also ==
- List of monuments and memorials removed during the George Floyd protests
