= Hammatt Billings =

American artist and architect (1818–1874)

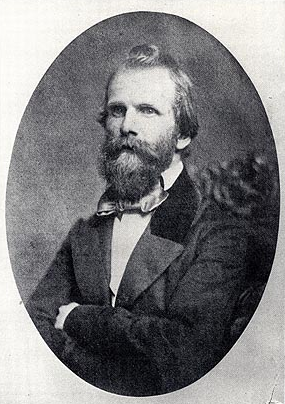
- Hammatt Billings, 1856
- Born: June 14, 1818; Boston or Milton, Massachusetts, United States
- Died: December 14, 1874 (aged 56); New York City, United States
- Occupation: Architect

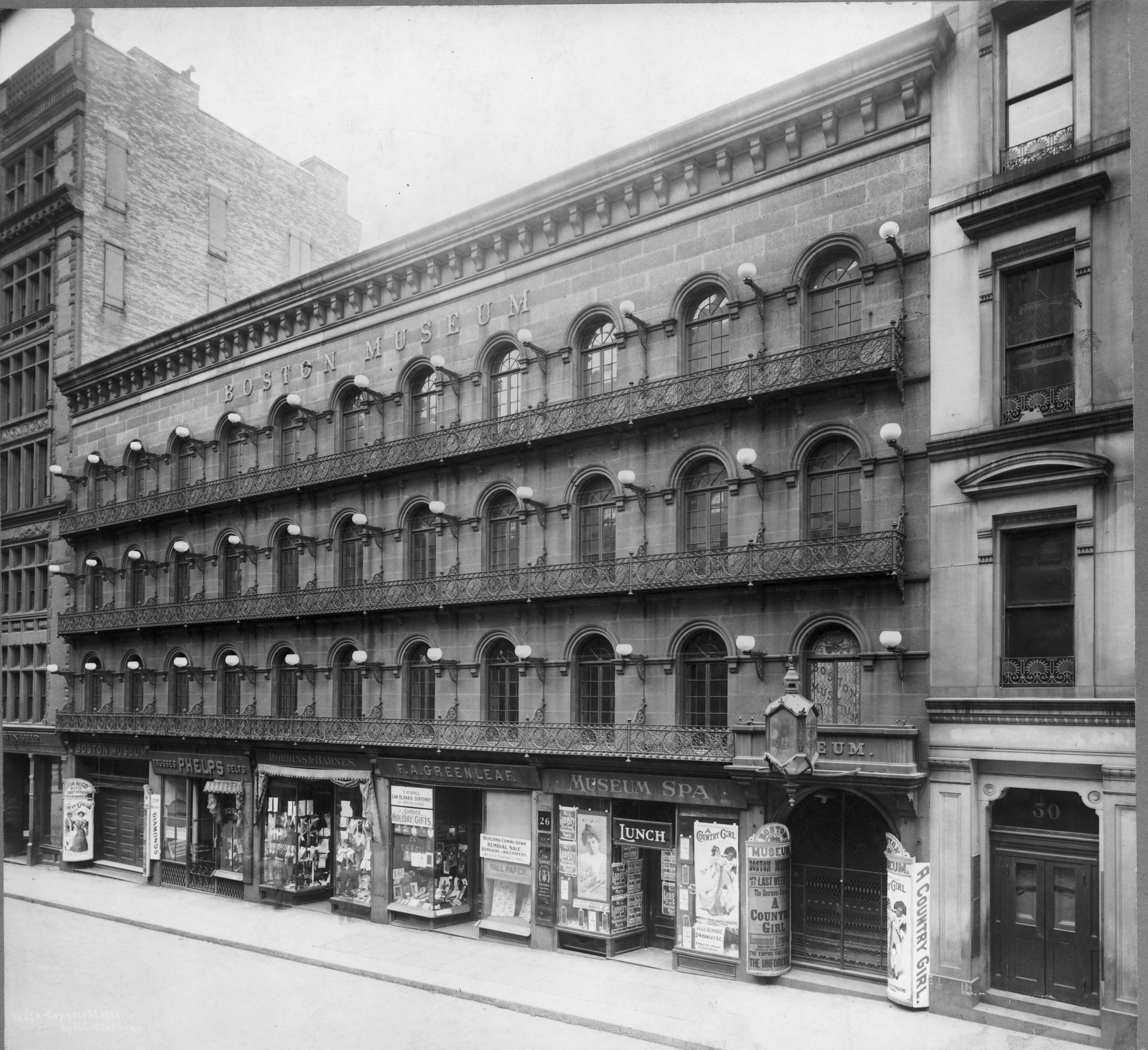
The now-demolished Boston Museum, designed by H. & J. E. Billings in the Italianate style and completed in 1846

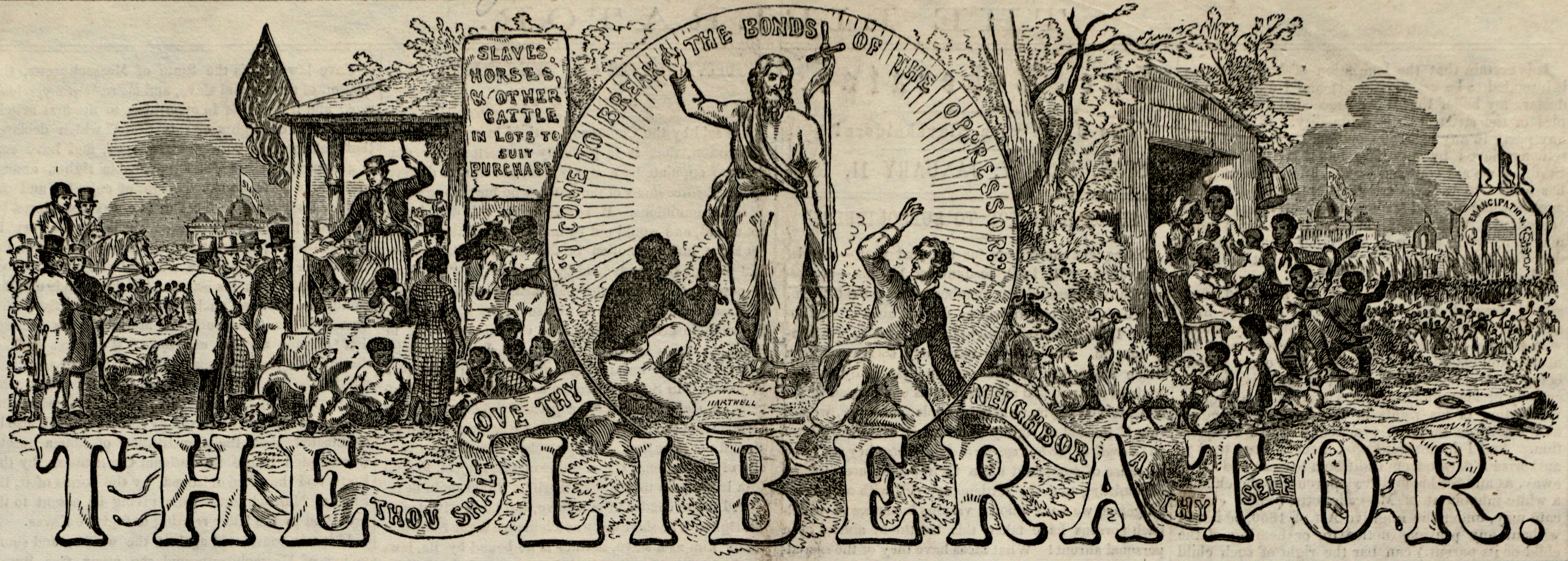
Billings's 1850 design for the masthead of The Liberator

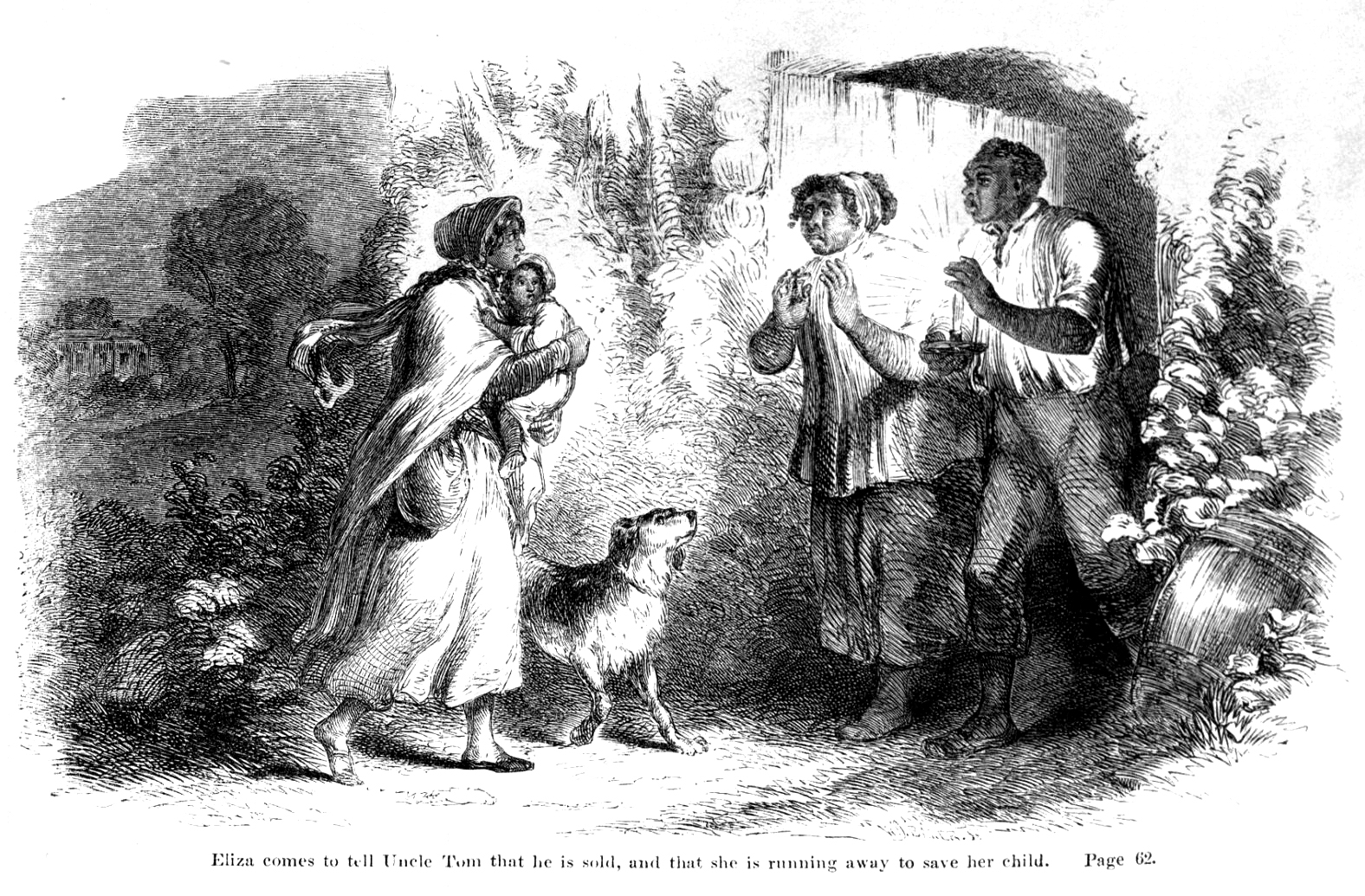
One of Billings's 1852 illustrations included in the first edition of Uncle Tom's Cabin

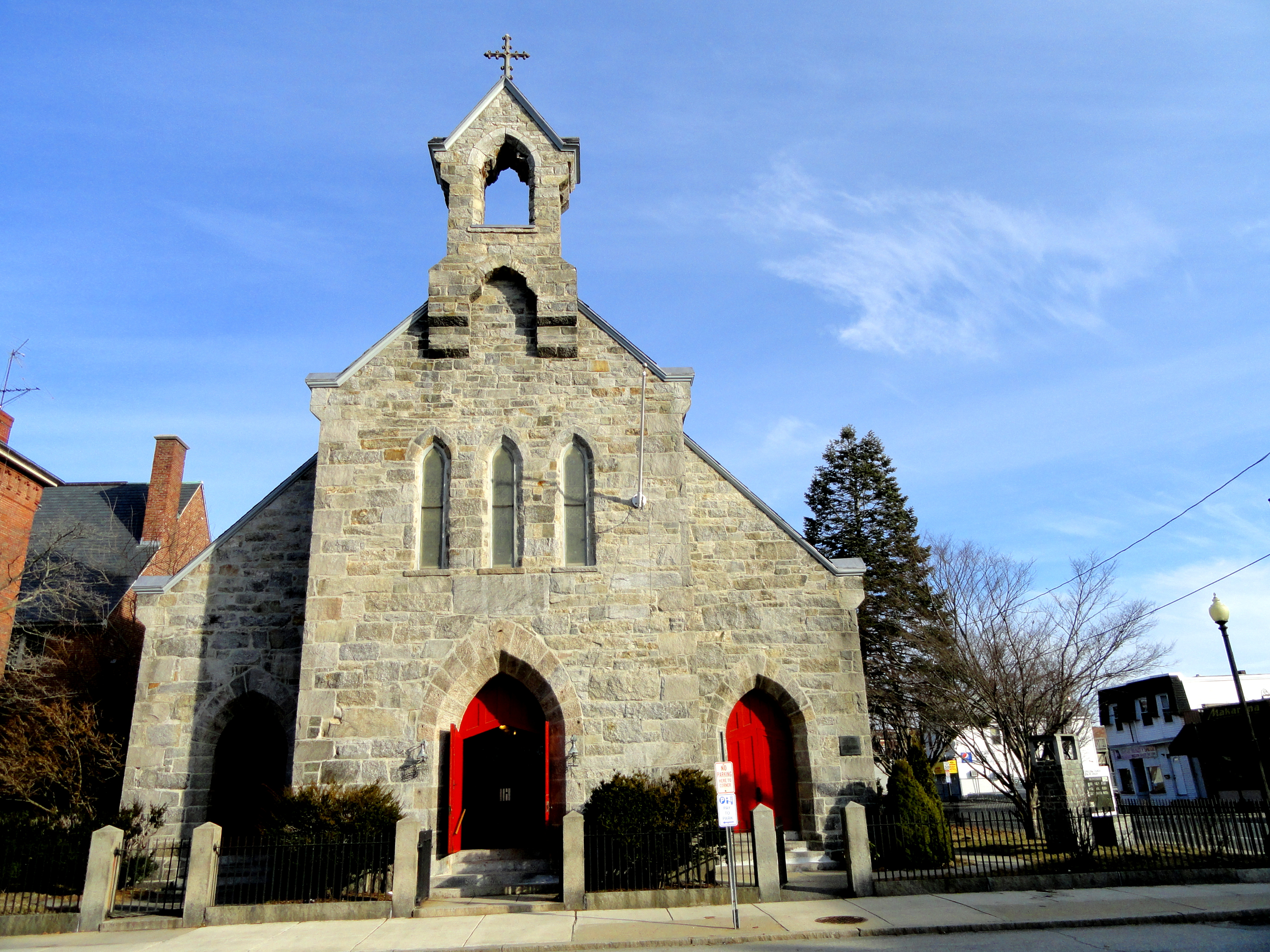
Grace Episcopal Church in Lawrence, designed by H. & J. E. Billings in the Gothic Revival style and completed in 1852

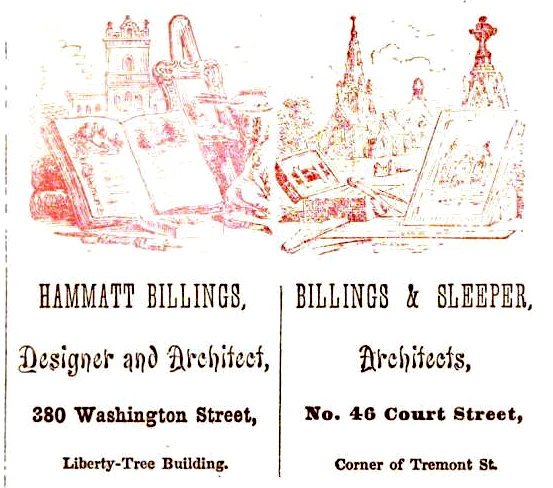
Billings's 1853 advertisements for both his and his brother's architectural practices

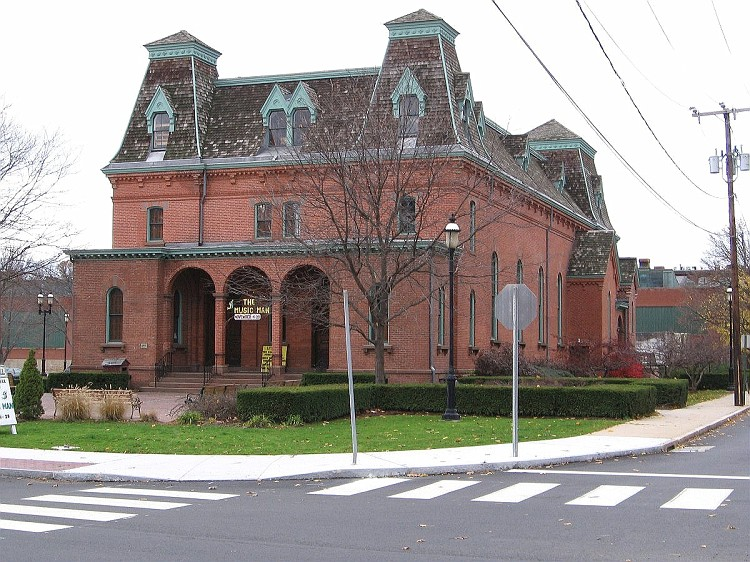
Cheney Hall in Manchester, Connecticut, designed by H. & J. E. Billings in the Second Empire style and completed in 1869

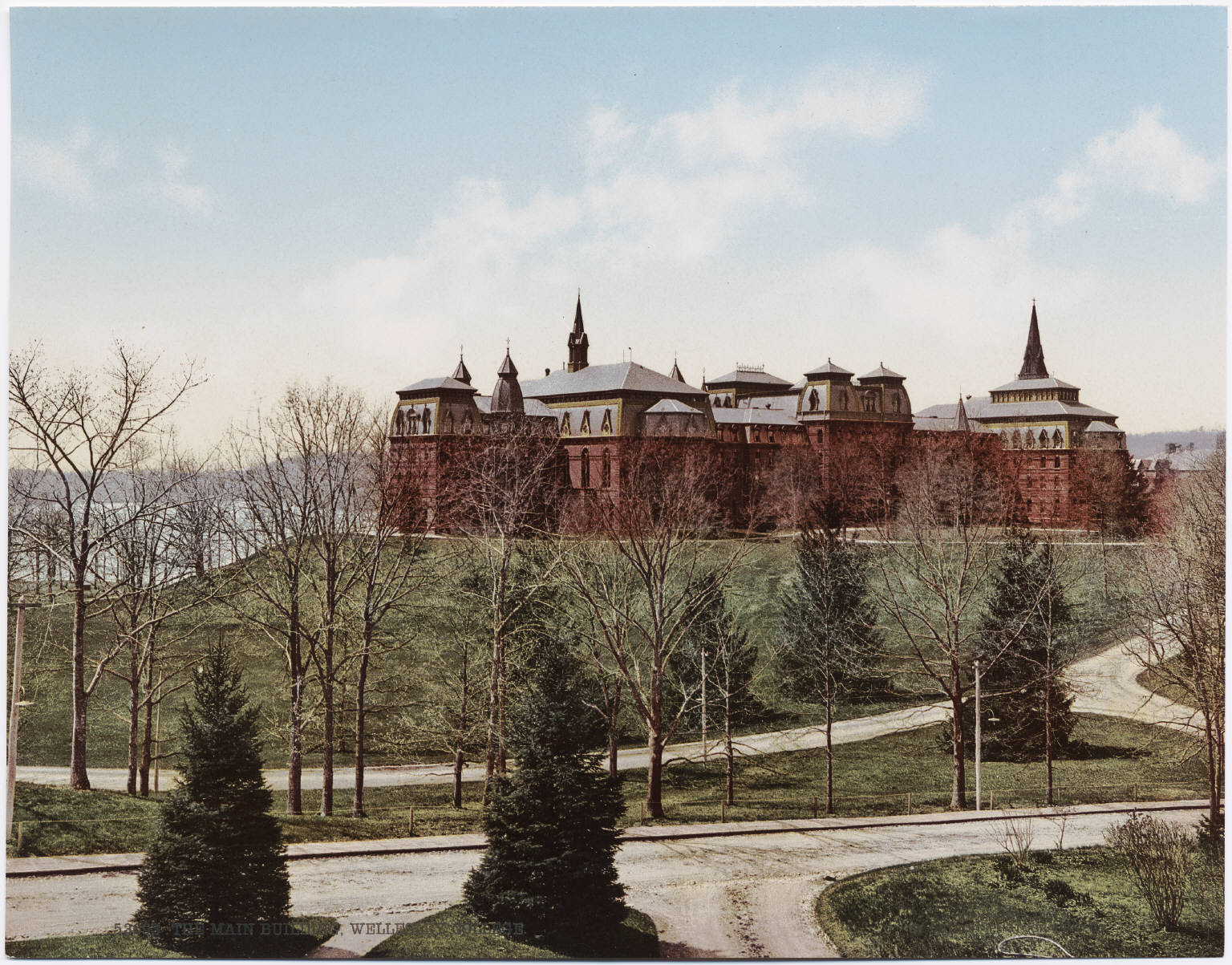
The now-destroyed College Hall of Wellesley College, designed by H. & J. E. Billings in the Second Empire style and completed in 1875

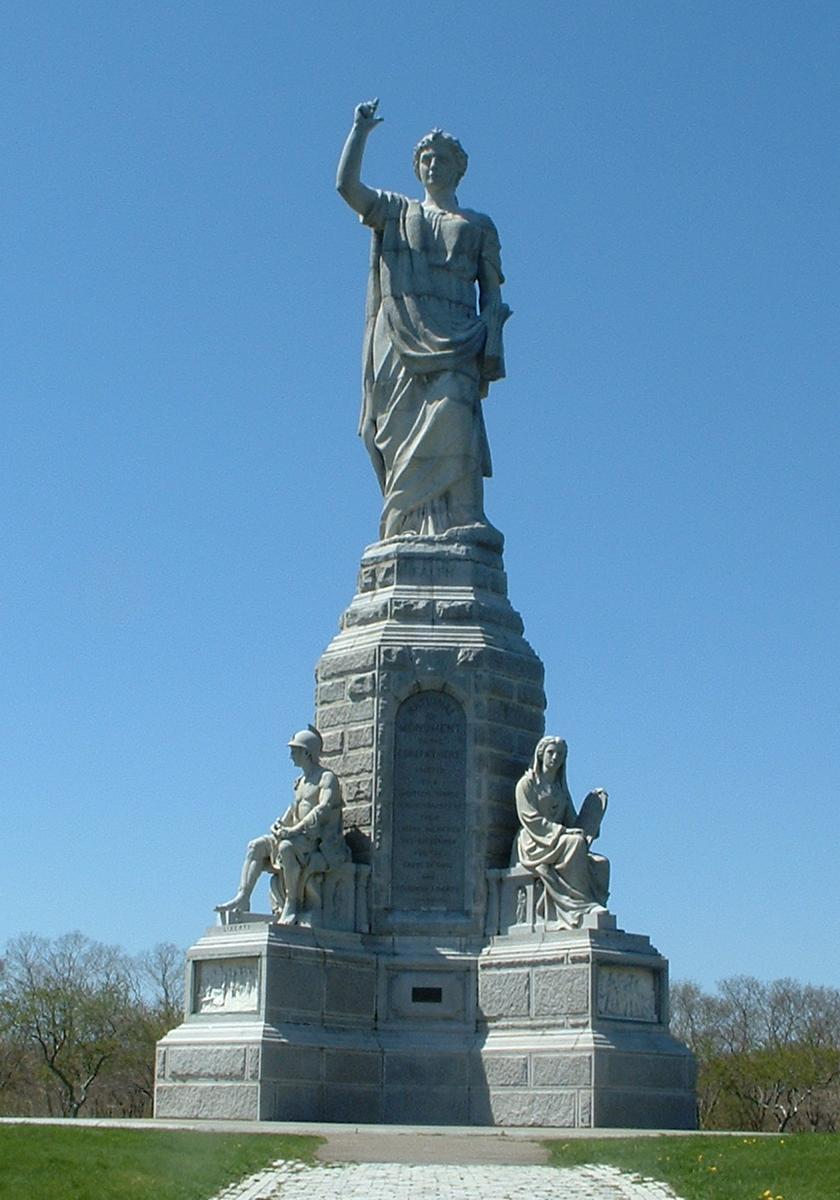
The National Monument to the Forefathers in Plymouth, first designed by Billings in 1854 and completed posthumously, after significant revisions, in 1889

Hammatt Billings (June 14, 1818 – November 14, 1874) was an artist and architect based in Boston who was active during the third quarter of the nineteenth century. As an illustrator he was responsible for the illustrations of the first two editions of Uncle Tom's Cabin which contributed to the novel's influence. His architectural career culminated in College Hall (1875), the original building of Wellesley College, and the National Monument to the Forefathers (1889). From c. 1845 to 1851 and from 1866 until his death in 1874 he worked in partnership with his brother Joseph Edward Billings, an architect and engineer, under the name H. & J. E. Billings.

== Early life and architectural career ==
Charles Howland Hammatt Billings, known professionally as Hammatt Billings, was born June 14, 1818, in Boston or Milton, Massachusetts, to Ebenezer Billings Jr., a tavern owner, and Mary Billings, née Janes. When he was a boy the family moved to the West End of Boston, where he was educated in the public schools. He entered English High School as a member of the class of 1834 but did not graduate. He was first apprenticed to engraver Abel Bowen, but within a few years entered into a new apprenticeship with architect Asher Benjamin. In 1838 he was hired as a draftsman by architect Ammi B. Young, who had moved to Boston after winning the competition to design the Boston Custom House (1847). Billings was responsible for many of the working drawings required for the construction of the custom house, a monumental Greek Revival building.

Though Billings had a varied career, many of his contemporaries saw his "real profession" as that of architect. In 1841 or 1842 he left Young and opened an independent architect's office. In 1845 or 1846 he formed the partnership of H. & J. E. Billings with his brother, Joseph Edward Billings, who had also worked for Young. Hammatt is usually described as a designer, while Joseph is thought to have been a civil engineer and superintendent. The brothers' first work was the second Boston Museum (1846, demolished 1903), a theatre and gallery on Tremont Street. This was one of the earliest examples of fully developed Italianate architecture in the United States. They followed this with the Church of the Savior (1847, demolished), a Gothic Revival church on Bedford Street. This project came with financial consequences that followed Billings for the rest of his life. He, with a mason, had been contracted to build the building, which he estimated would cost about $35,000. It cost double that amount, leaving him deeply in debt. The brothers' other works included a house in Cambridge for Richard Henry Dana Jr. (1851) and Grace Episcopal Church (1852, NRHP-listed) in Lawrence.

In 1851 Joseph withdrew to establish his own firm, known as Billings & Sleeper, and later was employed as a civil engineer at the Boston Navy Yard. During the next fifteen years Hammatt worked as a freelance designer for other architects while also following his other artistic pursuits. In 1857 he was retained by a committee of the Massachusetts Charitable Mechanic Association, which included architects Gridley J. F. Bryant and Nathaniel Jeremiah Bradlee, to produce elevations for the original Mechanics Hall (1860, demolished), which was adjacent to the earlier Church of the Savior. For Woodcock & Meacham he designed the elevations and silhouette of the former Tremont Street Methodist Episcopal Church (1862) and was likely retained in a similar role for the South Congregational Church (1868, NRHP-listed) in New Britain, Connecticut, for George F. Meacham alone.

== Illustration career ==
Outside of his work as an architect, Billings was widely known as an illustrator or books and periodicals, especially during the 1850s. According to his biographer, James F. O'Gorman, it is for his illustrations that he is best known today, in part for their quality and in part because many of his architectural works have been destroyed. With F. O. C. Darley he helped raise the artistic reputation of illustration. His first known illustration was the frontispiece for Rollo Code of Morals; or the Rules of Duty for Children (Jacob Abbott, 1841) and the first publication which he illustrated throughout was Chimes, Rhymes, and Jingles; or, Mother Goose's Songs (Munroe & Francis, 1845). Most of his early work was in children's books and books of poetry.

In 1850 he designed a new masthead for abolitionist newspaper The Liberator, to which he offered his services free of charge. He was later responsible for the illustrations in Uncle Tom's Cabin (Harriet Beecher Stowe, 1852), including for the first edition (1852) and for the much enlarged "splendid" edition (1853). He also illustrated works by other abolitionist authors. His illustrations for Uncle Tom's Cabin had a major role in the book's influence on the United States in the nineteenth century. His close association with other abolitionists likely indicates that he was one as well, though this is not specifically documented. He was later responsible for the illustrations of the second part of Little Women (Louisa May Alcott, 1869), after Abigail May Alcott's illustrations for the first part (1868) had been poorly received. He continued to work as an illustrator until his death, though his reputation declined in his last years.

== Later architectural career ==
After the American Civil War Billings focused most of his energy on his architectural practice. In 1866 he was commissioned to design Cheney Hall (1869), a multipurpose recreational building for the use of the millworkers of Manchester, Connecticut. Possibly to execute this commission, in July 1866 Joseph Billings resigned from his job at the navy yard and rejoined his brother in practice. Cheney Hall was designed primarily in the Second Empire style with Gothic influences. They designed two office buildings in downtown Boston, the Wesleyan Building (1870) and the second Cathedral Building (1874, demolished). In the suburbs they designed a house for Charles Ellis (1871, NRHP-listed) in West Newton, the First Congregational Church (1871, demolished 2013) in Belmont, the Wellesley Congregational Church (1872, demolished) and the former Thayer Public Library (1874, NRHP-listed) in Braintree.

Also during this period, Billings designed a library (1870, demolished) for Mount Holyoke College. The building was donated by Pauline Durant, whose husband, Henry Fowle Durant, was a Mount Holyoke trustee. In 1870 the Durants, vocal supporters of women's education, established Wellesley College and returned to Billings to design the new school. According to Edward Abbott, a member of the Wellesley board of visitors, Billings considered the resulting College Hall (1875, burned 1914) to be his "chiefest work." The Durants had Billings work from the model of the Main Building (1865) of Vassar College, which Billings reinterpreted in a hybrid Second Empire and High Victorian Gothic style, similar to but more elaborate than that of Cheney Hall. At its completion College Hall housed the entire institution and was soon to be functionally obsolete, as contemporary women's schools such as Smith College were adopting more dispersed campuses similar to those of men's schools. The destruction of the building in 1914 almost forced the closure of Wellesley. Five pillars which were salvaged from the site were used in 1972 to create a memorial to the building.

Billings was also known as a designer of monuments. The smaller of these included many grave markers in Mount Auburn Cemetery for members of the Boston elite. With Gridley Bryant he won an initial competition to design the Soldiers and Sailors Monument on the Boston Common, on which construction was begun but was ultimately scrapped due to cost. He also designed the Civil War monument in Concord (1867) and the pedestal for the Equestrian statue of George Washington (1869) in the Boston Public Garden.

Billings's largest monumental work was the National Monument to the Forefathers (1889), commemorating the Pilgrims in Plymouth. He submitted his proposal to the Pilgrim Society outside of its formal competition of 1854 and in 1855 was appointed architect in place of the official winner, Alexander Asboth. Billings employed nativist arguments to convince the responsible committee, believing that such a work should only be designed by a "native artist." His initial design was colossal in stature, being 153 feet tall, and was intended to "exceed any monumental structure of modern times." In 1859 cornerstones were laid for both the monument and a canopy (1867, demolished 1919) over Plymouth Rock itself. The canopy, in the form of a ciborum, was later replaced in part because it was felt to evoke the Roman Catholic church, inappropriate for a New England perceived to be Protestant. In 1874 funding for the monument was not yet in hand, and in November Billings drastically reduced its size by half. Contracts were let and after his death the pedestal was completed under the supervision of his brother. The crowning statue of Faith was placed in 1877 and was poorly received by critics. Joseph Billings's death in 1880 contributed to further delays and the completed monument was not dedicated until 1889. Billings's initial design had been widely circulated and well received in the years before the Civil War, when it was seen as a representation of the founding principles of the United States. By the time it was completed it had been outshone by the Statue of Liberty and had been reduced to a strictly local affair.

== Personal life and death ==
Billings was married in 1841, or possibly later, to a Miss Sarah Mason in Roxbury. In 1852 he began construction of a family home, later known as The Eminence (1853, NRHP-listed), on land owned by his brother in Auburndale. According to the house's first occupant, Thomas Hall, Sarah Billings's mental health declined rapidly during construction, leading her to be committed to what is now McLean Hospital. In 1853, with the frame up and roof on, Billings abandoned the project and sold the house to Hall, who completed and occupied it. The ultimate fate of Sarah Billings is not known. About 1859 he married second to Phoebe Warren, though they were separated by the mid-1860s. He had no children by either wife.

Though much less known than his work as architect or illustrator, Billings was also in his time well known as a painter, mostly of landscapes and historical and biblical scenes. In 1843 he joined the short-lived Boston Artists' Association, soon followed by Joseph. He was also a member of the New England Art Union and its successor, the Massachusetts Academy of Fine Arts. In 1867 he was one of a group of nine architects, led by Nathaniel Bradlee, which met to organize the Boston Society of Architects, though he did not become a member himself until later.

Billings was modest and at times unconfident. At the beginning of his career he described himself as a man of "grand ideas with puny execution." In his lifetime he was recognized by most critics as a talented artist, some going so far as to compare him with Michelangelo, though others believed that by dividing his efforts he did not fully reach his potential. A close friend, Ednah Dow Littlehale Cheney, believed that because of "his pecuniary necessities" he "scattered his forces in many different and unworthy directions." The anonymous author of his obituary in the journal Old and New thought that "had he devoted himself from the start to any one specialty, his life would have been one of greater accomplishment...but the element of caprice in the selection of department and subject, while it demonstrated his wonderfully varied accomplishments, prevented what should have been the full results of so much decided genius."

Billings died November 14, 1874, at the home of his brother Henry in New York City at the age of 56.
