= Louis C. Elson =

American music professor (1848–1920)

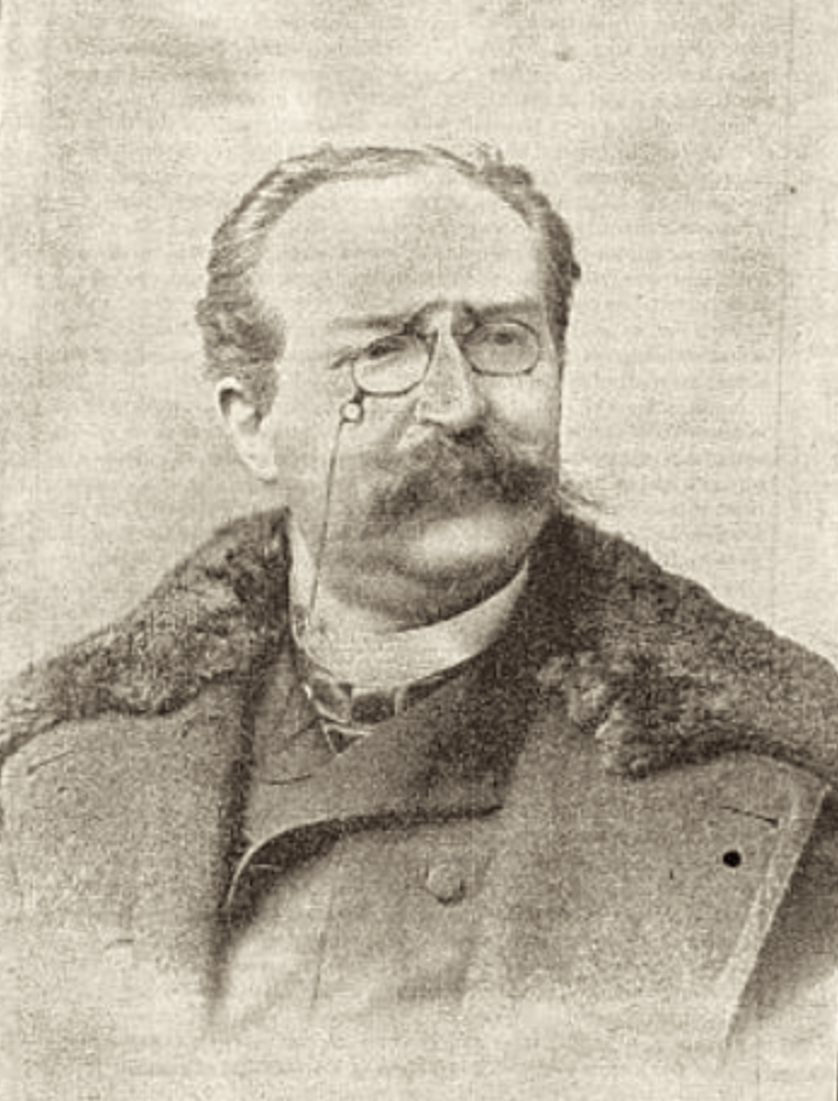
Louis C. Elson

Louis Charles Elson (April 17, 1848 – February 14, 1920) was an American music historian, music critic, writer on music, journalist, and professor of music theory at the New England Conservatory. He was influential editor of American music magazines, and along with William Foster Apthorp and Philip Hale was a leading music critic in Boston in the late 19th and early 20th centuries. He was also a singer and composer, but only had modest success in these two aspects of his career. His son, Arthur Elson (1873–1940), was also an editor and writer on music.

== Early life, education, and early career ==
The son of Julius and Rosalie Elson, Louis Charles Elson was born in Boston, Massachusetts on April 17, 1848. He was educated in his native city at the Brimmer School on Common St. and the Mayhew School on Hawkins Street. His parents were of German descent. His mother was a talented amateur musician, and he began his music education at home with his mother when he was seven years old. He continued his music studies in Boston with organist and horn player Carl August Hamann (piano) and tenor August Kreissmann (singing). From Kreissmann he received a thorough grounding in the German lieder repertoire.

By the early 1870s Elson was teaching his own private music students in Boston, and his students gave a piano recitals at Wesleyan Hall in 1872 and at Mechanics Hall in 1874 and 1875. He arranged Franz Abt's Lark's Rejoicing for a performance at the 1872 World's Peace Jubilee and International Musical Festival in Boston. It was performed by Minna Peschka-Leutner. He married Bertha Lissner in Boston in 1873. His son Arthur was born later that year.

Elson achieved modest success as a vocalist; and was a singer at Trinity Church, Boston and Emmanuel Episcopal Church, Boston (EECB). In February 1874 he appeared in concert as a baritone with contralto Addie S. Ryan and pianist Carlyle Petersilea at the music hall located in the premises of Oliver Ditson and Company as part of the Parker-Memorial concerts. The following December he was a soloist in a concert at Odd Fellows Hall, Boston, and was the conductor for Christmas Eve program presented at EECB. At EECB he was conductor of the children's choir in the 1870s. He sang in other Parker-Memorial concerts in 1875, and conducted the 1876 Easter program at EECB.

After this he went to Germany to pursue further studies music at the Leipzig Conservatory. There he was a pupil of Karl Gloggner-Castelli with whom he studied music theory and music composition. Through Gloggner he developed a strong interest in writings on music and his knowledge of music literature greatly increased.

== Career ==
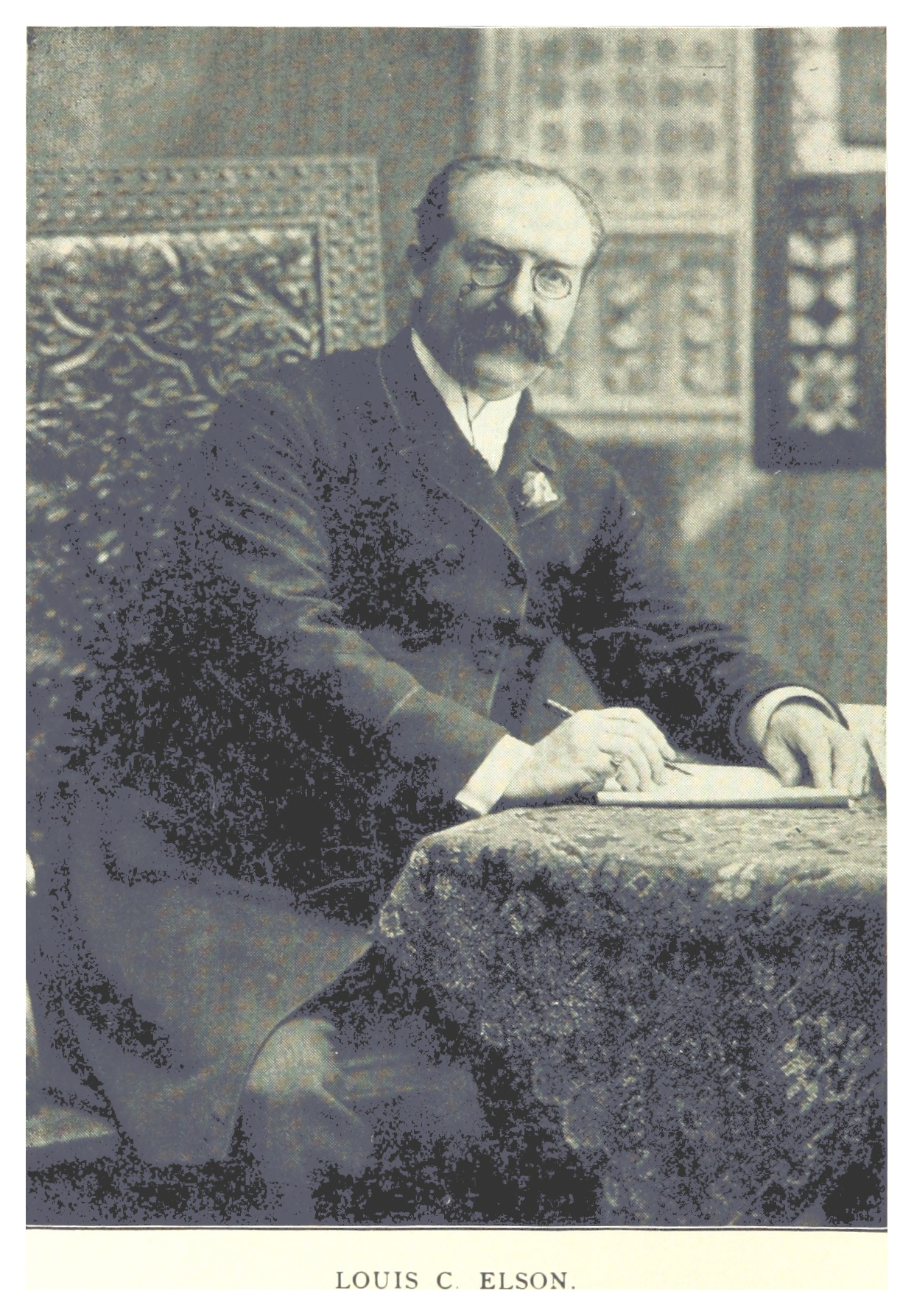
Louis C. Elson

In 1877 Elson returned to the United States after completing his studies in Leipzig. He began his career as a music journalist soon after; writing first for Musician and Artist magazine. He became a contributor to the music journal The Vox Humana, and was appointed editor of that publication in 1880. He concurrently worked as editor of several other music publications including Musical Herald (appointed editor in 1880) and Musical World (appointed editor in 1880).

Elson contributed articles articles to music journals published in Berlin (Die Musik), Buenos Aires (Correo Musicale), and Paris (Revue musicale). In 1883–1884 he worked as a European correspondent for the Boston Evening Transcript, and in 1888 he was appointed music editor of the Boston Daily Advertiser. He held this latter post until his death in 1920.

In 1876 Elson gave his first lecture on music. In 1880 he joined the faculty of the New England Conservatory (NEC) as a lecturer in music history. He became a professor of music theory and was named the head of the NEC's theory department in 1882. He remained in that position until his death approximately 38 years years later. He also lectured at Boston University; giving 240 lectures there over a seven year period.

Elson was the author or editor of numerous books on music. His book The History of American Music (1904) was organized by music genre rather than by time period. Among other content, it contained one of the earliest publications on the history of American orchestras with a focus on city rivalries and the durability of these ensembles. It also emphasized the importance of Theodore Thomas's impact on the American orchestra. He was the chief editor of the ten volume University Encyclopedia of Music (1912).

As a critic Elson displayed conservative tastes and was critical of post-Wagnerian music developments. In reviewing Claude Debussy's La mer (English: The Sea) he dubbed the work La Mal de Mer (English: seasickness), and likewise stated that Debussy's Prelude to the Afternoon of a Faun needed treatment from a veterinarian.

As a composer, Elson composed songs, works for solo piano, operettas, and instrumental works. He was also a prolific arranger.

Elson died in Boston on February 14, 1920. Following his death, his wife established a memorial fund in his name at the Library of Congress which paid for an annual lecture presentation on music.

== Selected publications ==
=== Books ===
- Curiosities of Music (1880)
- The History of German Song (1888)
- Theory of Music (1890)
- European Reminiscences, Musical and Otherwise (1891)
- The Realm of Music (1892)
- Great Composers and their Work (1898)
- The National Music of America and its Sources (1900)
- Famous Composers and Their Works (1900)
- Shakespeare in Music (1901)
- The History of American Music (1904)
- Elson's Music Dictionary (1905)
- Folk Songs of Many Nations (1905)
- Elson's Pocket Music Dictionary (1909)
- Mistakes and Disputed Points in Music and Music Teaching (1910)
- Children in Music (1918)
- Women in Music (1918)

=== Songs ===
- "Dash Along Gallop" (1872, White, Smith & Company; words and music by Elson)
- "To Horse" (1875, Oliver Ditson and Company; words and music by Elson)
- "Murmuring Voice of the Deep" (1875, Oliver Ditson and Company; words and music by Elson)
- "Morning Song (Morgeulied)" (1875, Oliver Ditson and Company; words and music by Elson)
- "America's Centennial" (1876, Oliver Ditson and Company; words and music by Elson)
- "I'll Fly with Thee" (1876, Oliver Ditson and Company; music by F. Paolo Tosti and words by Elson)

=== Choral ===
- "Echo's of the Surf Waltz", three sacred quartettes for chorus and quartette choir (1876, Oliver Ditson and Company; words and music by Elson)
