= Joseph Edward Billings =

American architect and civil engineer (1820–1880)

Joseph E. Billings
- Born: August 27, 1820; Milton, Massachusetts, United States
- Died: August 15, 1880 (aged 59); Boston, Massachusetts, United States
- Occupation: Architect

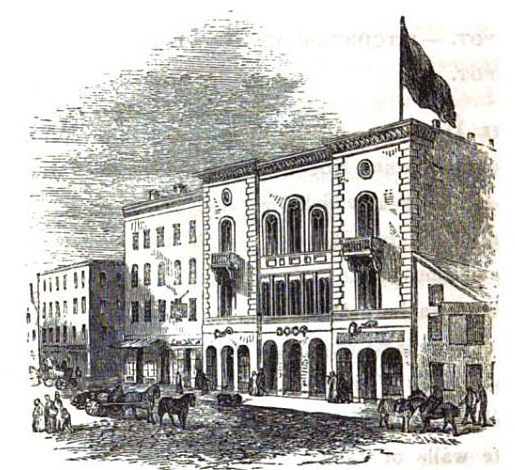
The National Theatre in the West End of Boston, designed by Billings & Sleeper in the Italianate style and completed in 1852

Joseph E. Billings (August 27, 1820 – August 15, 1880) was an American architect and civil engineer based in Boston during the third quarter of the nineteenth century. From c. 1845 to 1851 and from 1866 until his 1874 he worked in partnership with his brother Hammatt Billings under the name H. & J. E. Billings, and from 1851 to 1853 with Charles F. Sleeper under the name Billings & Sleeper. After the death of Hammatt in 1874 Billings commenced construction of his long-delayed National Monument to the Forefathers in Plymouth, Massachusetts.

== Life and career ==
Joseph Edward Billings was born August 27, 1820, in Milton, Massachusetts, to Ebenezer Billings Jr., a tavern owner, and Mary Billings, née Janes. He likely received his architectural education in the office of Boston architect Ammi B. Young, where he would have worked alongside his elder brother, Hammatt. In 1845 or 1846 he left Young and joined his brother to form the partnership of H. & J. E. Billings. Billings, known as an architect and civil engineer, is believed to have been chiefly responsible for the structural aspects of the firm's buildings and for superintendence, while Hammatt was responsible for design.

In 1851 Billings left to establish the firm of Billings & Sleeper with Charles F. Sleeper (1826–1915), a younger architect who was a son of Boston Journal publisher John Sherburne Sleeper. Their works included the first building of what is now Lasell University (1851, demolished), the second National Theatre (1852, demolished) in Boston and St. Stephen's Episcopal Church (1855, burned 1896) in Wilkes-Barre, Pennsylvania. In 1853, while work in Wilkes-Barre was still ongoing, Billings was appointed civil engineer of the Charlestown Navy Yard. Over the next thirteen years he was responsible for many buildings projects at the yard, most notably the steam engineering building and its 240-foot "Great Chimney" (1858, demolished).

In July 1866 Billings resigned from the Navy Yard and reestablished his partnership with Hammatt, settling into the same role as before. Hammatt died in 1874 leaving several projects incomplete. Billings completed College Hall (1875, burned 1914) of Wellesley College and after a long delay commenced construction of the National Monument to the Forefathers (1889) in Plymouth. He completed the pedestal and oversaw the placement of the first statues but left it unfinished at his own death. Billings is known to have been the principal designer of a few of the firm's buildings: the Ingraham School (1848, demolished) in the North End of Boston and the Odd Fellows Hall (1872, demolished) in the South End. Though the Victorian Gothic Odd Fellows Hall fits into the firm's work of the 1870s, the Ingraham School is austere and backward looking in comparison to that of the 1840s.

== Personal life and death ==
During the American Civil War, Billings served in the Massachusetts Volunteer Militia. He was, like Hammatt, a member of the short-lived Boston Artists' Association.

Billings was married in 1849 to Harriet A. Farrington. She died in 1859, shortly after their tenth anniversary. Billings died August 15, 1880, at home in Roxbury, Boston, at the age of 59.
