= Pilgrim Memorial State Park =

State park in Plymouth, Massachusetts

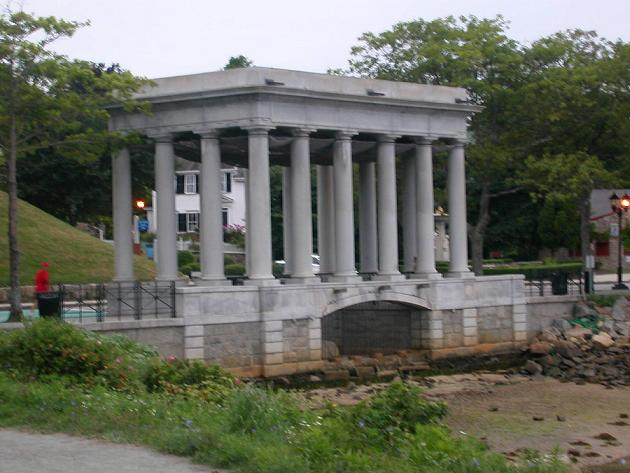
- The building that encloses Plymouth Rock

- Location within Massachusetts Location within the United States
- Location: Plymouth, Massachusetts, United States
- Coordinates: 41°57′30″N 70°39′43″W
- Area: 17 acres (6.9 ha)
- Elevation: 10 ft (3.0 m)
- Established: 1920
- Administrator: Massachusetts Department of Conservation and Recreation
- Website: Official website

Pilgrim Memorial State Park comprises two monuments — Plymouth Rock and the National Monument to the Forefathers — in Plymouth, Massachusetts. Closely related to these memorials is the Myles Standish Monument State Reservation which can be seen across the Plymouth Bay in Duxbury, Massachusetts. Owned by the Commonwealth of Massachusetts, these sites are managed by the Massachusetts Department of Conservation and Recreation.

== History ==
Pilgrim Memorial State Park was created in 1920 to celebrate the 300th anniversary of the Pilgrim landing. Landfill was brought in and the shoreline changed, creating arms of land around Plymouth Rock. The portico designed by McKim, Mead and White was completed and other memorials donated and dedicated.

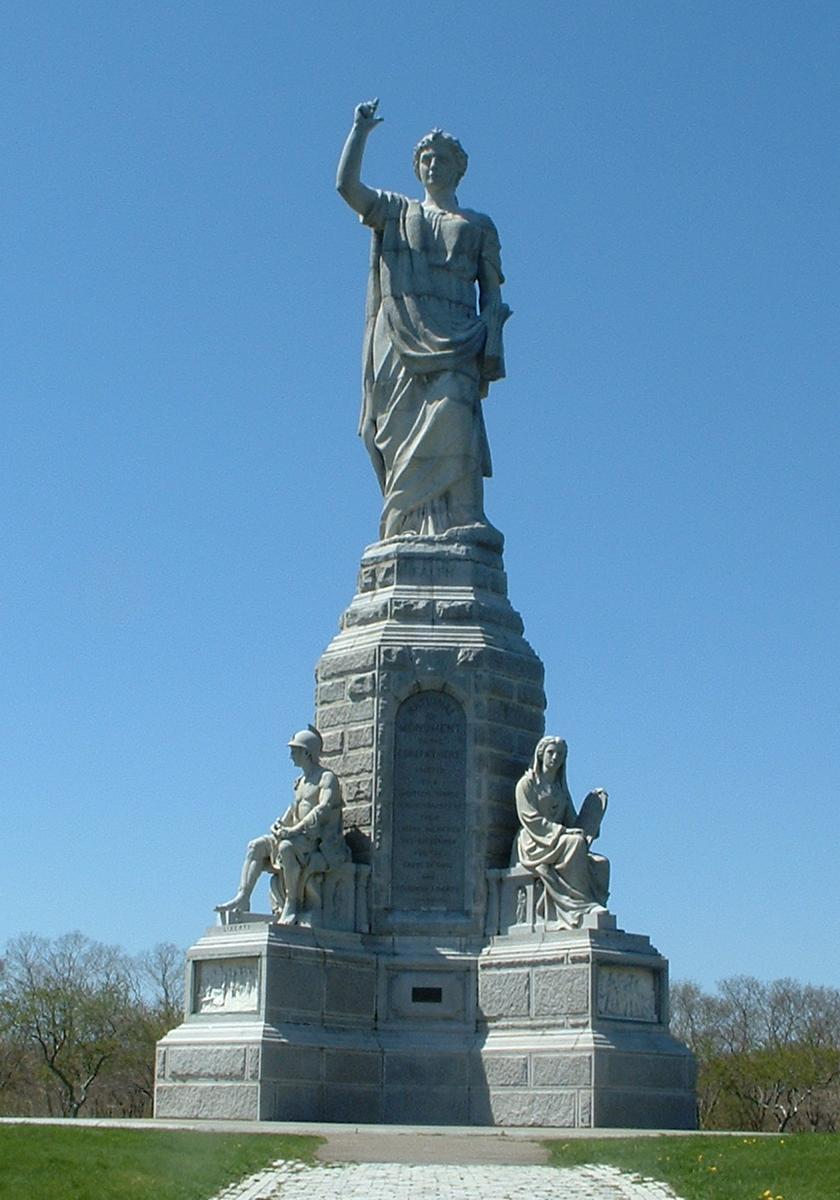
The National Monument to the Forefathers
