= The Eminence =

Historic house in Massachusetts, United States

- U.S. National Register of Historic Places
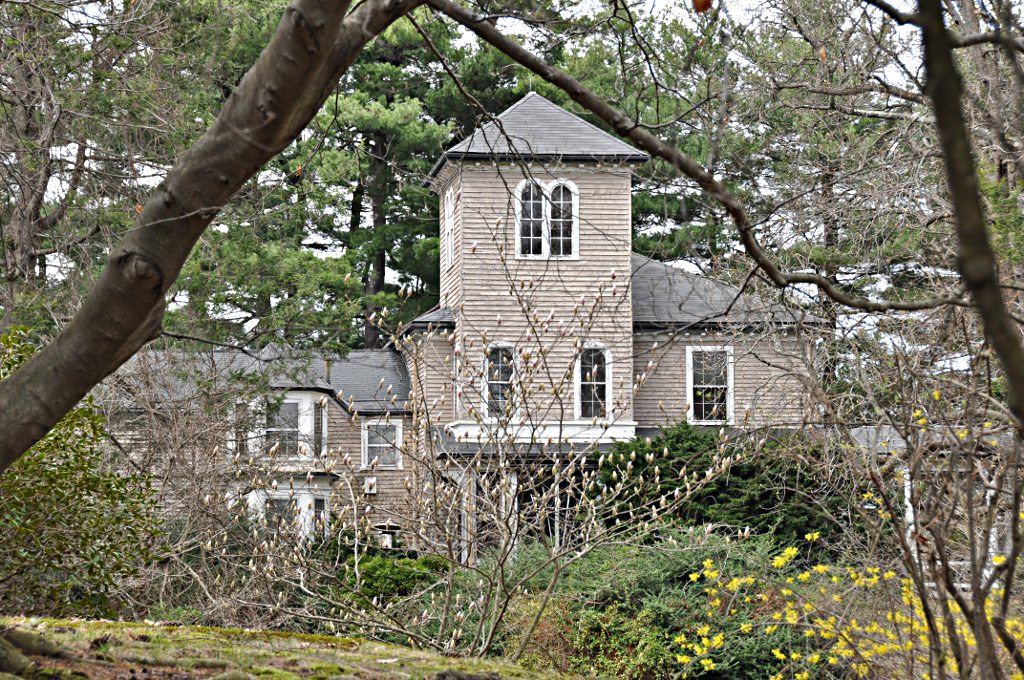

- Location within Massachusetts Location within the United States
- Location: 122 Islington Rd., Newton, Massachusetts
- Coordinates: 42°20′59″N 71°15′30″W
- Built: 1853
- Architect: Hammatt Billings
- Architectural style: Italian Villa
- MPS: Newton MRA
- NRHP reference No.: 86001793
- Added to NRHP: September 04, 1986

The Eminence is an historic estate house located on a 5.6 acre riverfront parcel at 122 Islington Road in the village of Auburndale in Newton, Massachusetts. Built in 1853, it was designed by noted Boston architect Hammatt Billings in the Italian Villa style of architecture, and is one of two surviving high-style Italianate estate houses in the Auburndale area. It was purchased, in unfinished state, by Thomas Hall, a magnetic instrument maker, in 1853.

On September 4, 1986, it was added to the National Register of Historic Places.

== See also ==
- National Register of Historic Places listings in Newton, Massachusetts
