= Grace Episcopal Church (Lawrence, Massachusetts) =

Historic church in Massachusetts, United States

- U.S. National Register of Historic Places
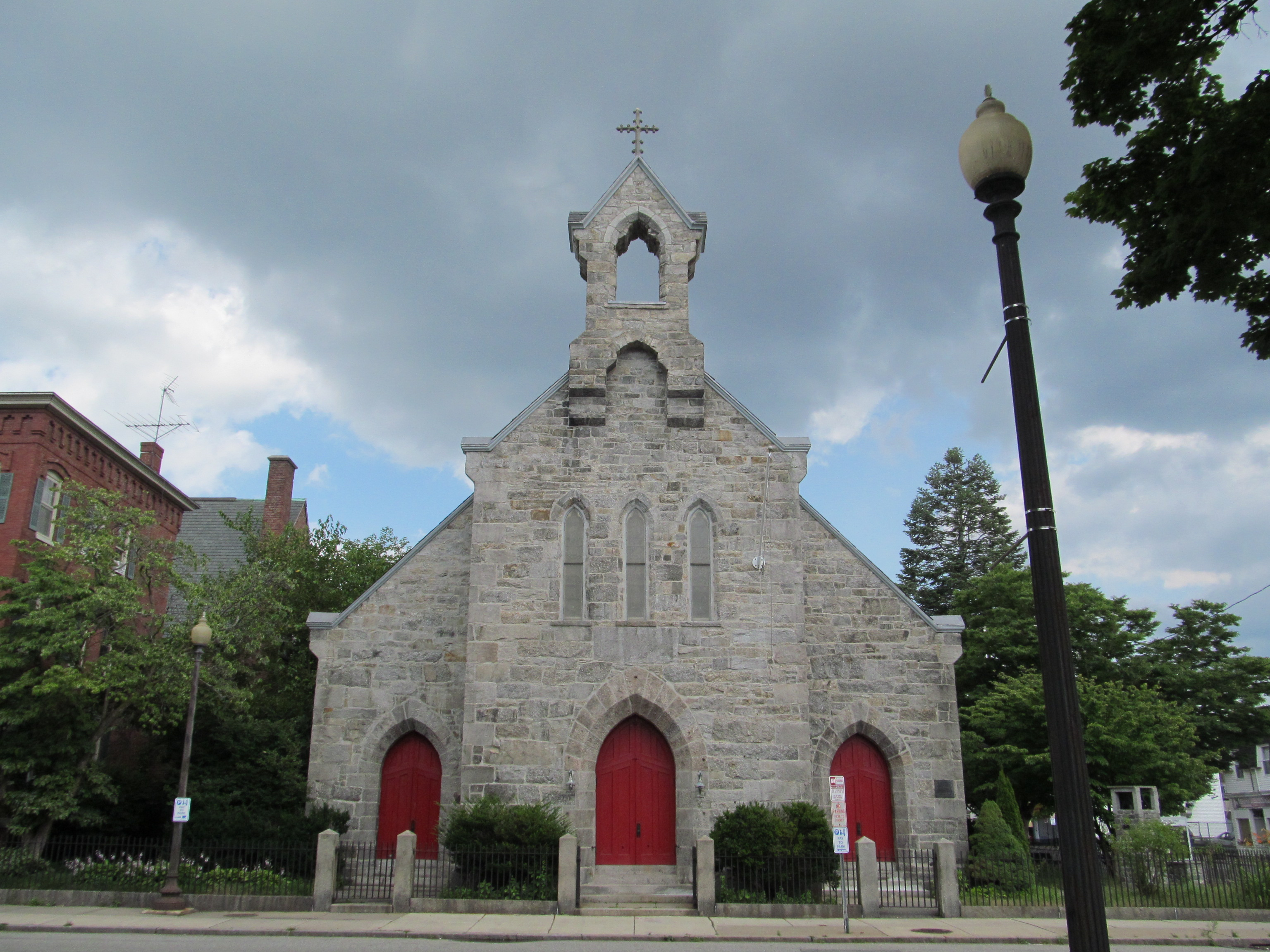
- Grace Episcopal Church

- Location within Massachusetts Location within the United States
- Location: Lawrence, Massachusetts
- Coordinates: 42°42′31″N 71°9′29″W
- Built: 1851
- Architect: Hammatt Billings, Ralph Adams Cram
- NRHP reference No.: 76001966
- Added to NRHP: November 7, 1976

Grace Episcopal Church is a historic Episcopal church building at Common and Jackson Streets in Lawrence, Massachusetts. The site on which it as built has been used for religious facilities since 1846, around the time of Lawrence's founding. This simple Gothic Revival stone structure was built in 1852, replacing an earlier wooden chapel, and was enlarged in 1892. The church is also notable for its association with the Lawrence family: William Lawrence, grandson of founder Abbott Lawrence, became its minister in 1876.

The church reported 297 members in 2018 and 173 members in 2023; no membership statistics were reported in 2024 parochial reports. Plate and pledge income reported for the congregation in 2024 was $59,251 with average Sunday attendance (ASA) of 114 persons.

The church was listed on the National Register of Historic Places in 1976.

== See also ==
- National Register of Historic Places listings in Lawrence, Massachusetts
- National Register of Historic Places listings in Essex County, Massachusetts
