= National Monument to the Forefathers =

Coordinates: 41°57′36″N 70°40′34″W

- U.S. National Register of Historic Places
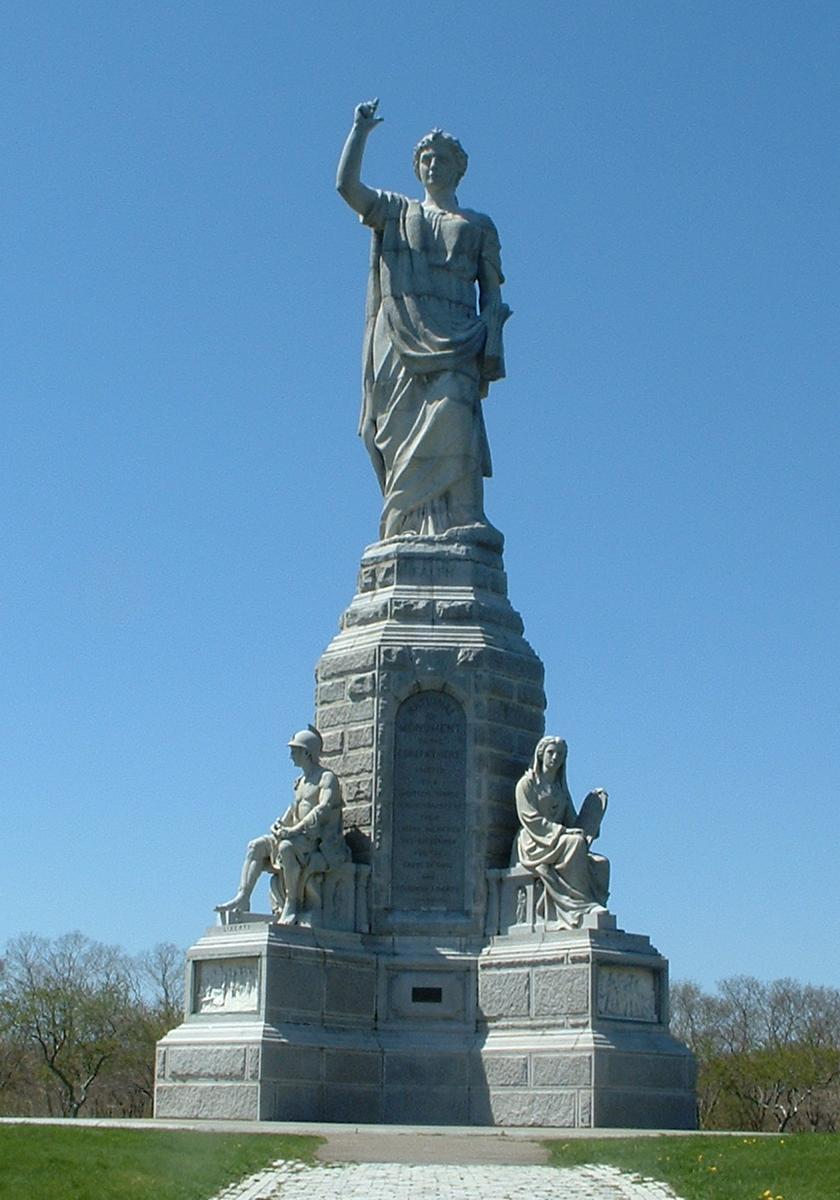
- National Monument to the Forefathers
- Location: 72 Allerton St. Plymouth, Massachusetts
- Built: August 1, 1889
- NRHP reference No.: 74002033
- Added to NRHP: August 30, 1974

The National Monument to the Forefathers, formerly known as the Pilgrim Monument, commemorates the Mayflower Pilgrims. Dedicated on August 1, 1889, it honors their ideals as later generally embraced by the United States. It is thought to be the world's largest solid granite monument.

== Overview ==
Located at 72 Allerton Street in Plymouth, Massachusetts, the 81-foot-tall (25 m) monument was commissioned by the Pilgrim Society. The original concept dates to around 1820, with actual planning beginning in 1850. The cornerstone was laid August 2, 1859 by the Grand Lodge of Masons in Massachusetts, under the direction of Grand Master John T. Heard. The monument was completed in October 1888, and was dedicated with appropriate ceremonies on August 1, 1889.

Hammatt Billings, Boston architect, illustrator, and sculptor, originally conceived the monument as a 150-foot-tall (46 m) structure comparable to the Colossus of Rhodes. Shortly before his death in 1874, Billings reduced the size of the monument, which was to be made entirely of granite quarried in Hallowell, Maine. The project was then passed to Billings' brother Joseph who, along with other sculptors including Alexander Doyle, Carl Conrads, and James Mahoney, reworked the design, although the basic components remained. The monument, which faces northeast to Plymouth Harbor (and, roughly, towards Plymouth, England), sits in the center of a circular drive, which is accessed from Allerton Street from the east. The plan of the principal pedestal is octagonal, with four small, and four large faces; from the small faces project four buttresses. On the main pedestal stands the heroic figure of "Faith" with her right hand pointing toward heaven and her left hand clutching the Bible. Upon the four buttresses also are seated figures emblematic of the principles upon which the Pilgrims founded their Commonwealth; counter-clockwise from the east are Morality, Law, Education, and Liberty. Each was carved from a solid block of granite, posed in the sitting position upon chairs with a high relief on either side of minor characteristics. Under "Morality" stand "Prophet" and "Evangelist"; under "Law" stand "Justice" and "Mercy"; under "Education" are "Youth" and "Wisdom"; and under "Liberty" stand "Tyranny Overthrown" and "Peace". On the face of the buttresses, beneath these figures are high reliefs in marble, representing scenes from Pilgrim history. Under "Morality" is "Embarcation"; under "Law" is "Treaty"; under "Education" is "Compact"; and under "Liberty" is "Landing". Upon the four faces of the main pedestal are large panels for records. The front panel is inscribed as follows: "National Monument to the Forefathers. Erected by a grateful people in remembrance of their labors, sacrifices and sufferings for the cause of civil and religious liberty." The right and left panels contain the names of those who came over in the Mayflower. The rear panel, which was not engraved until recently, contains a quotation from Governor William Bradford's famous history, Of Plymouth Plantation:

Thus out of small beginnings greater things have been produced by His hand that made all things of nothing and gives being to all things that are; and as one small candle may light a thousand, so the light here kindled hath shone unto many, yea in some sort to our whole nation; let the glorious name of Jehovah have all praise.

The overall scheme was designed by architect Hammatt Billings. The 36-foot figure of Faith was based on a 9-foot plaster model by William Rimmer in 1875, that was enlarged and altered by Joseph Edward Billings and a sculptor named Perry (probably John D. Perry). The subsidiary statues were executed by area sculptors including Alexander Doyle, Carl Conrads, and James H. Mahoney.

== National Register ==
The monument was listed on the National Register of Historic Places on August 30, 1974. Originally under the care of the Pilgrim Society, it was given to the Massachusetts government in 2001. It and Plymouth Rock constitute the Pilgrim Memorial State Park. Although intended as national in scope, the Forefathers Monument is not a federal "National Monument" as understood today from the Antiquities Act of 1906.

== Film ==
Monumental: In Search of America's National Treasure, a 2012 documentary hosted by Kirk Cameron, features the history of the monument and the values of those it commemorates.

== Images ==
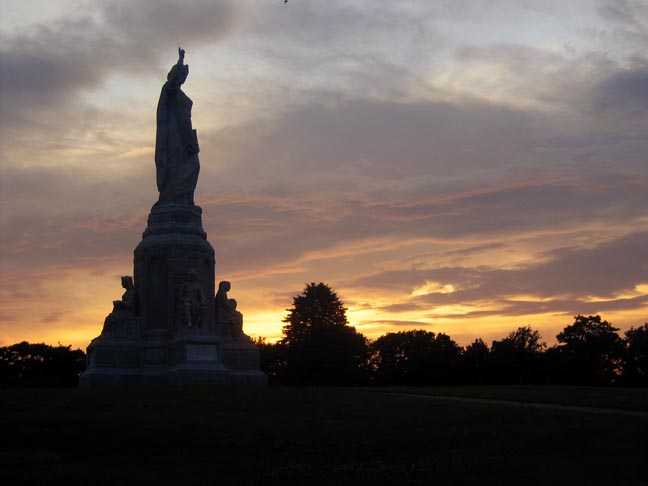
The Monument at sunset, 2007

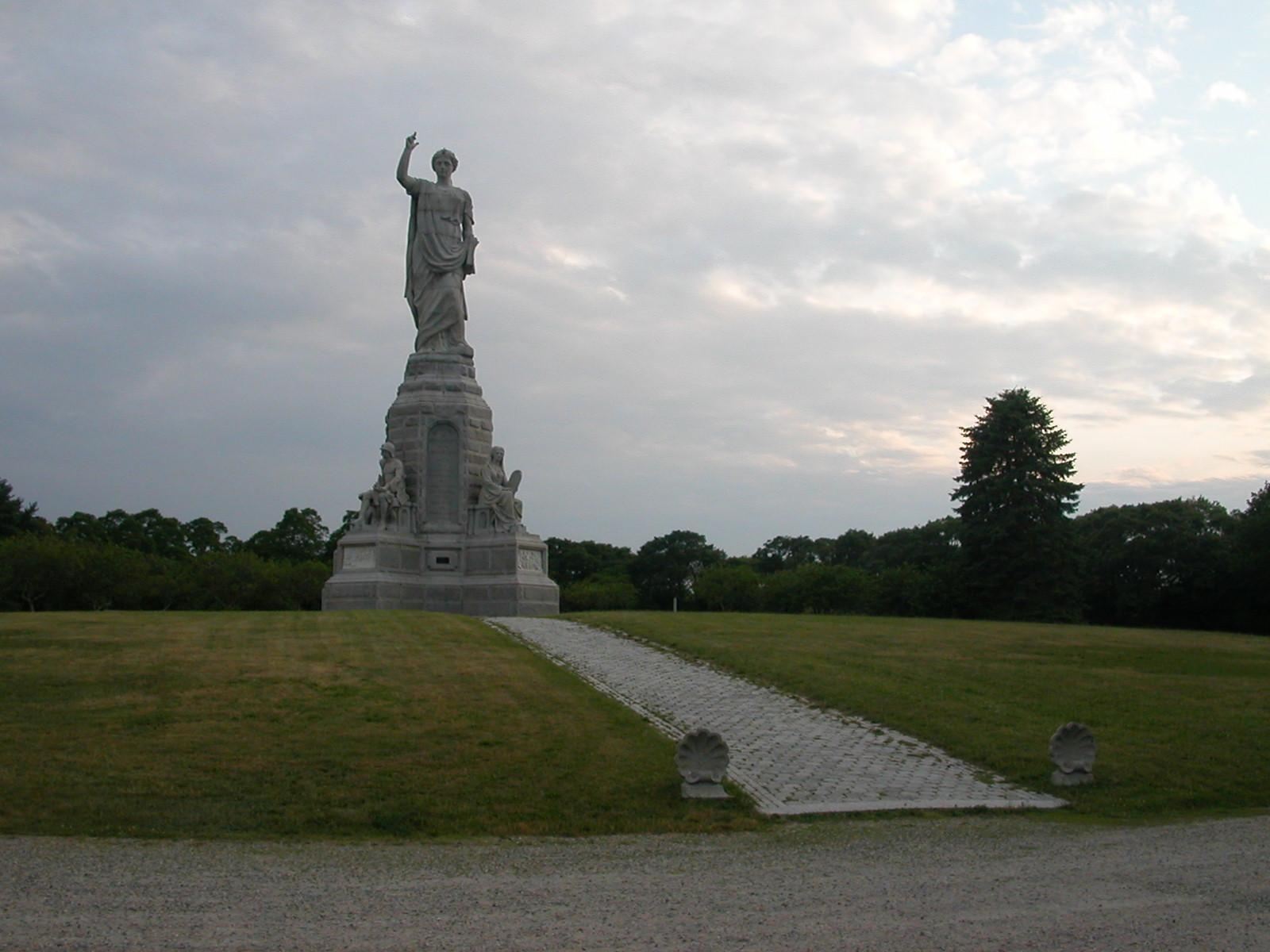
Monument and the surrounding park

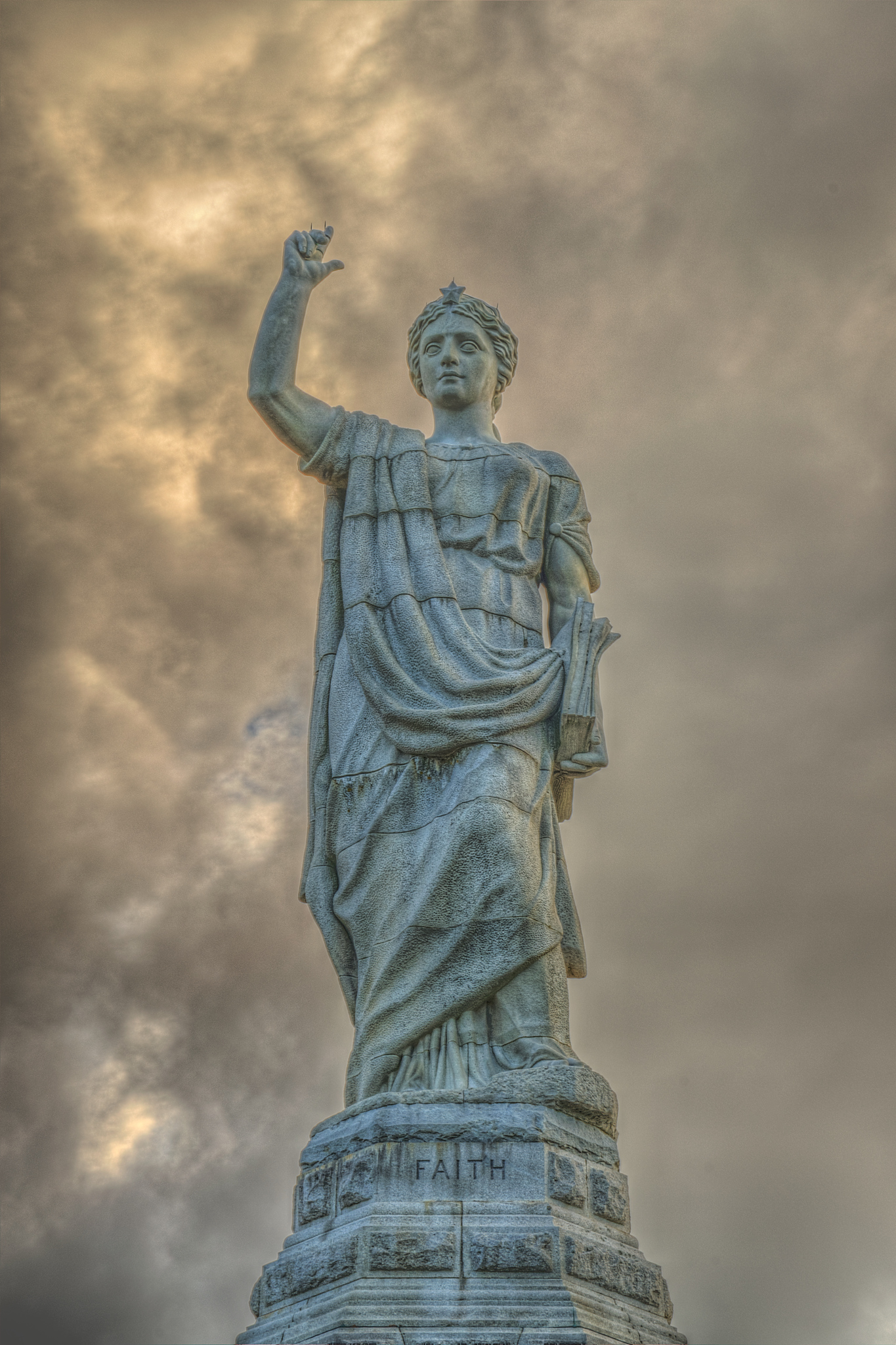
Detail of statue of Faith

=== Seated Figures ===
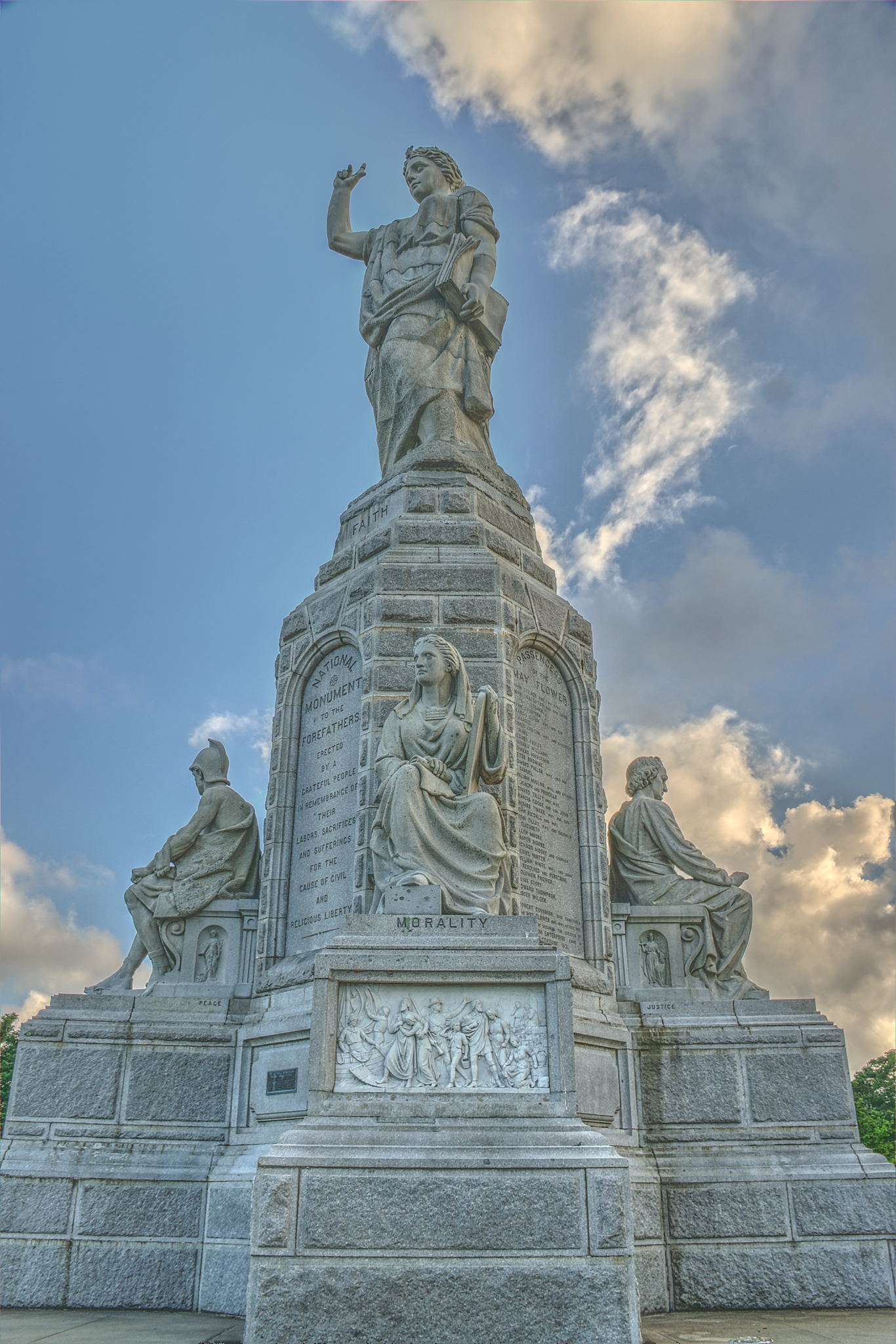
Morality

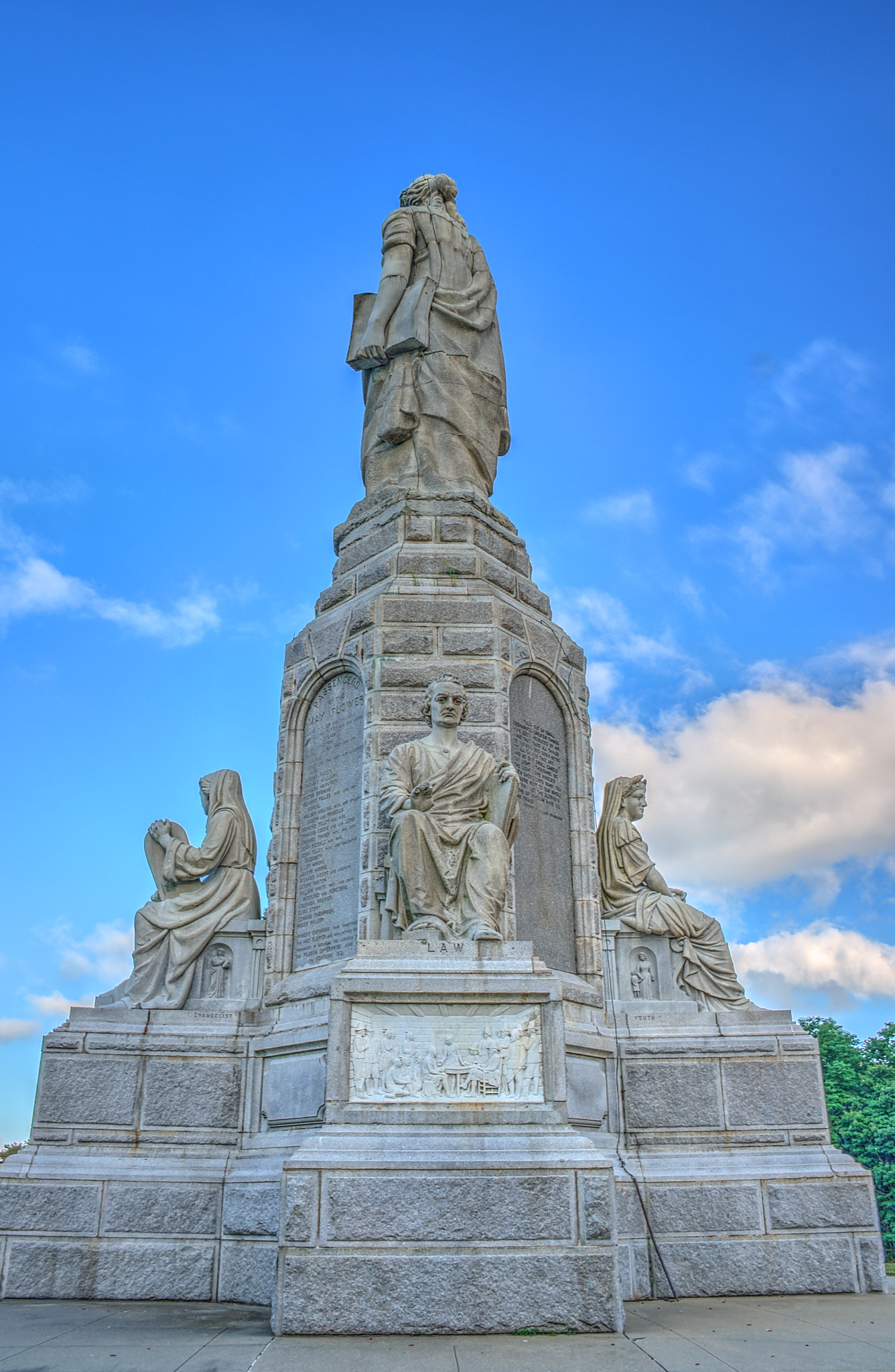
Law

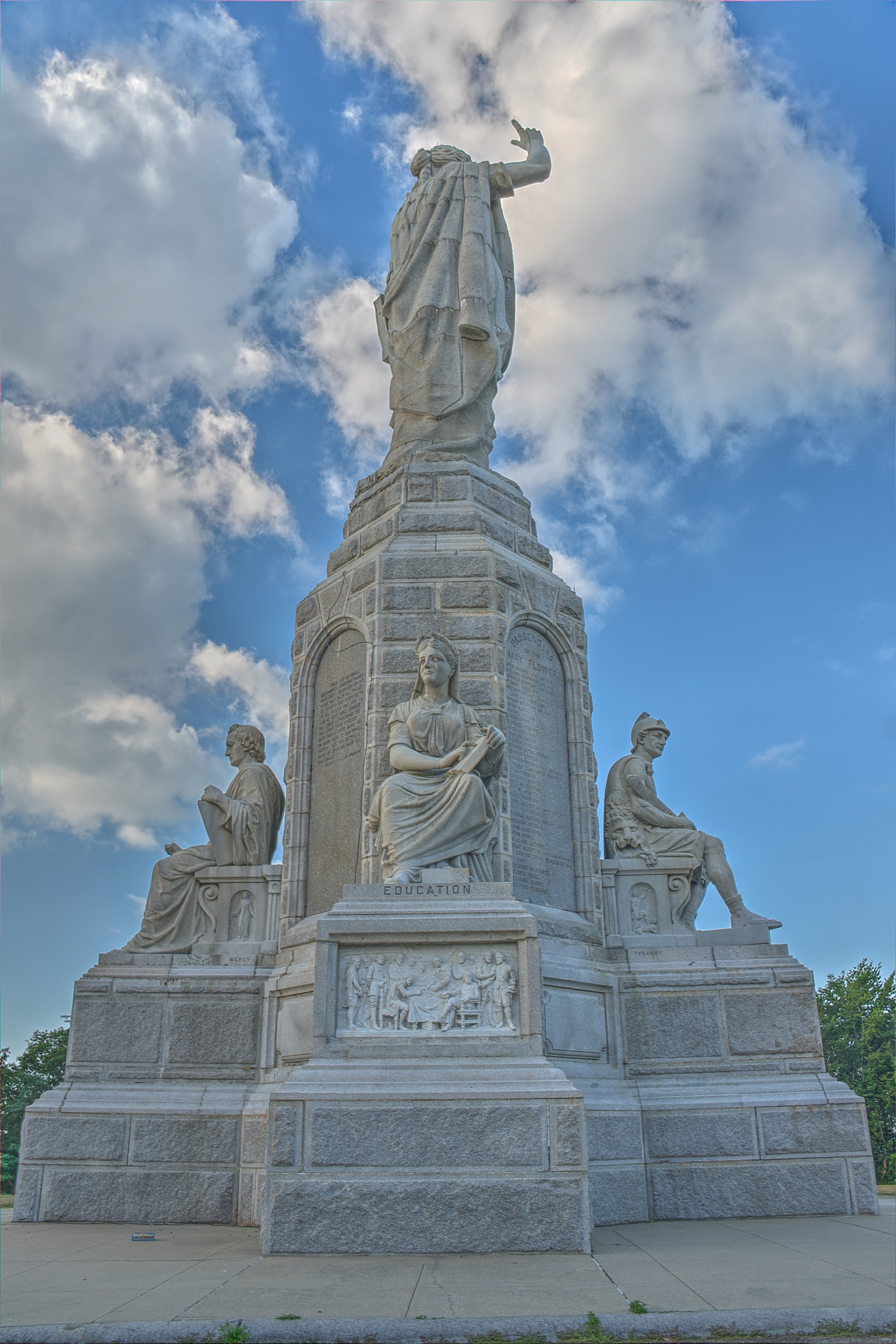
Education

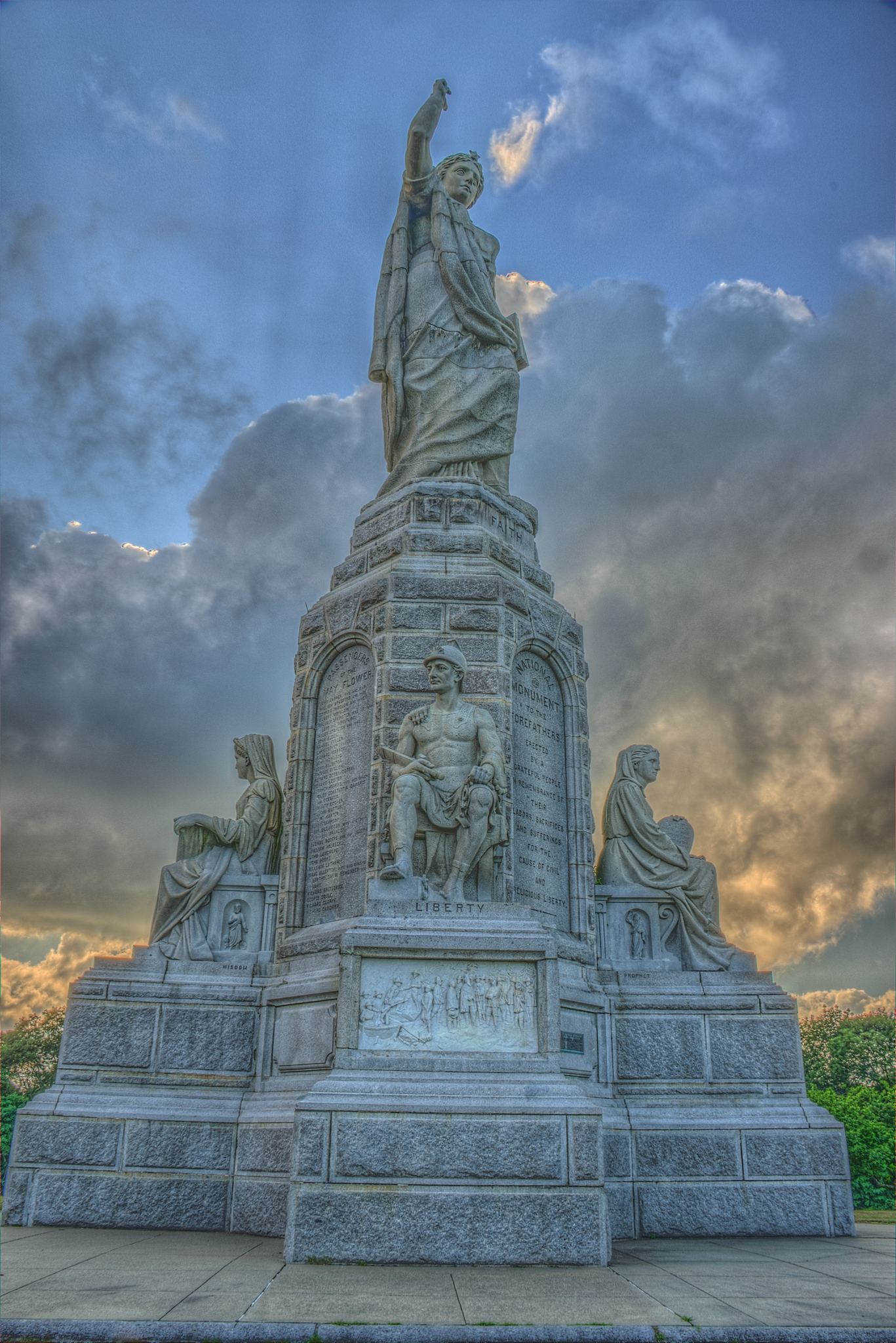
Liberty

=== Panels on Monument ===
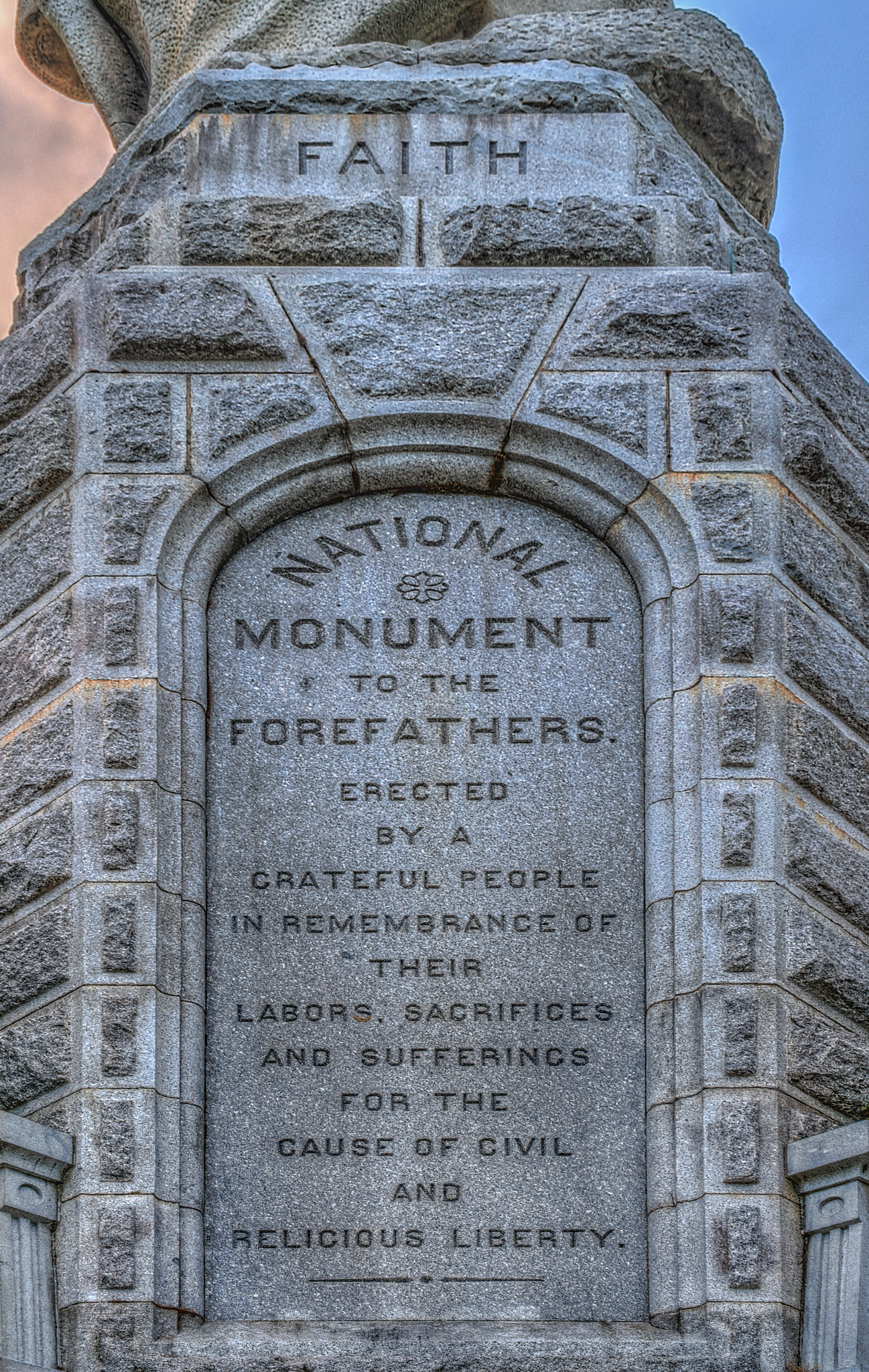
Detail of front panel

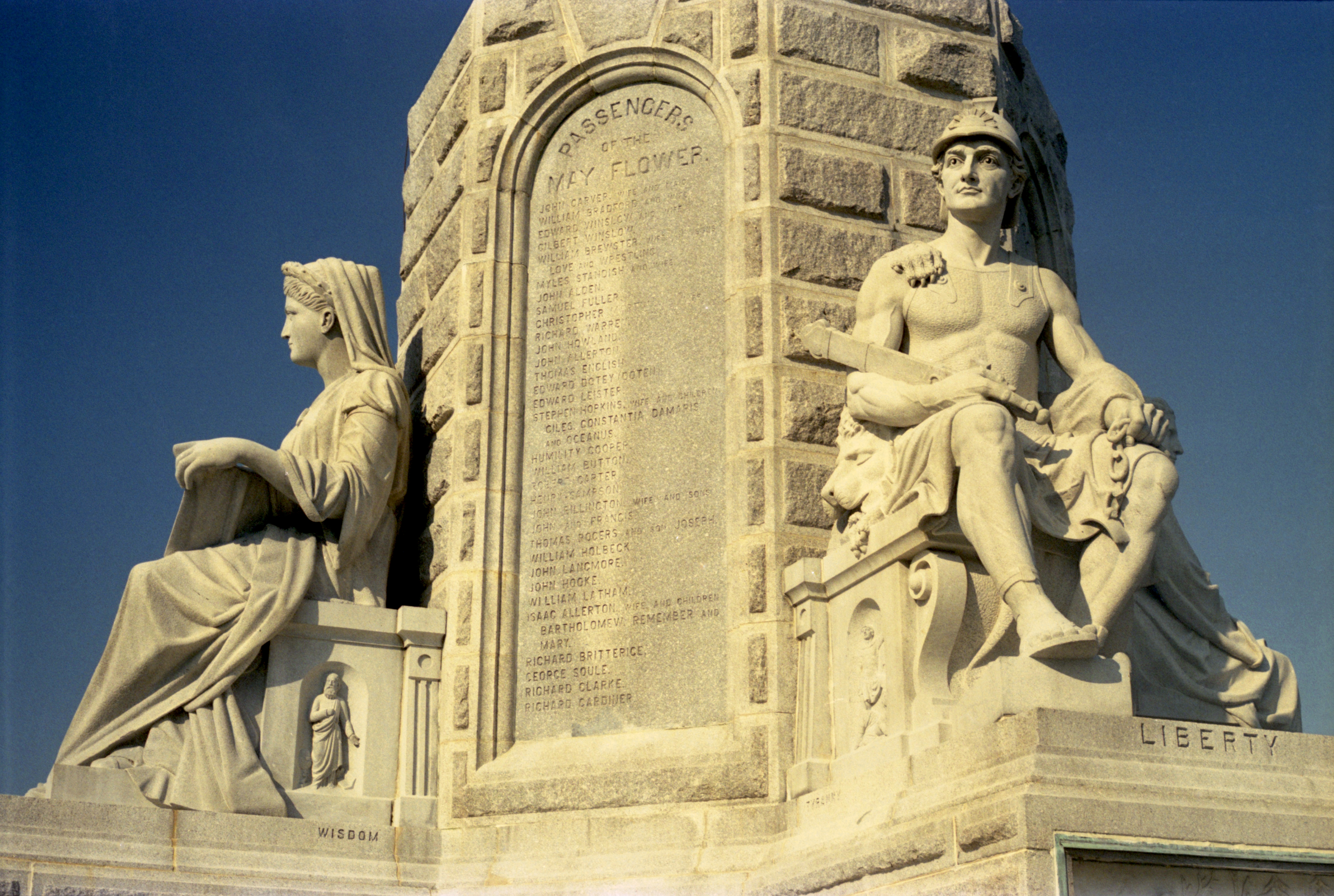
Passengers of the Mayflower (part 1)

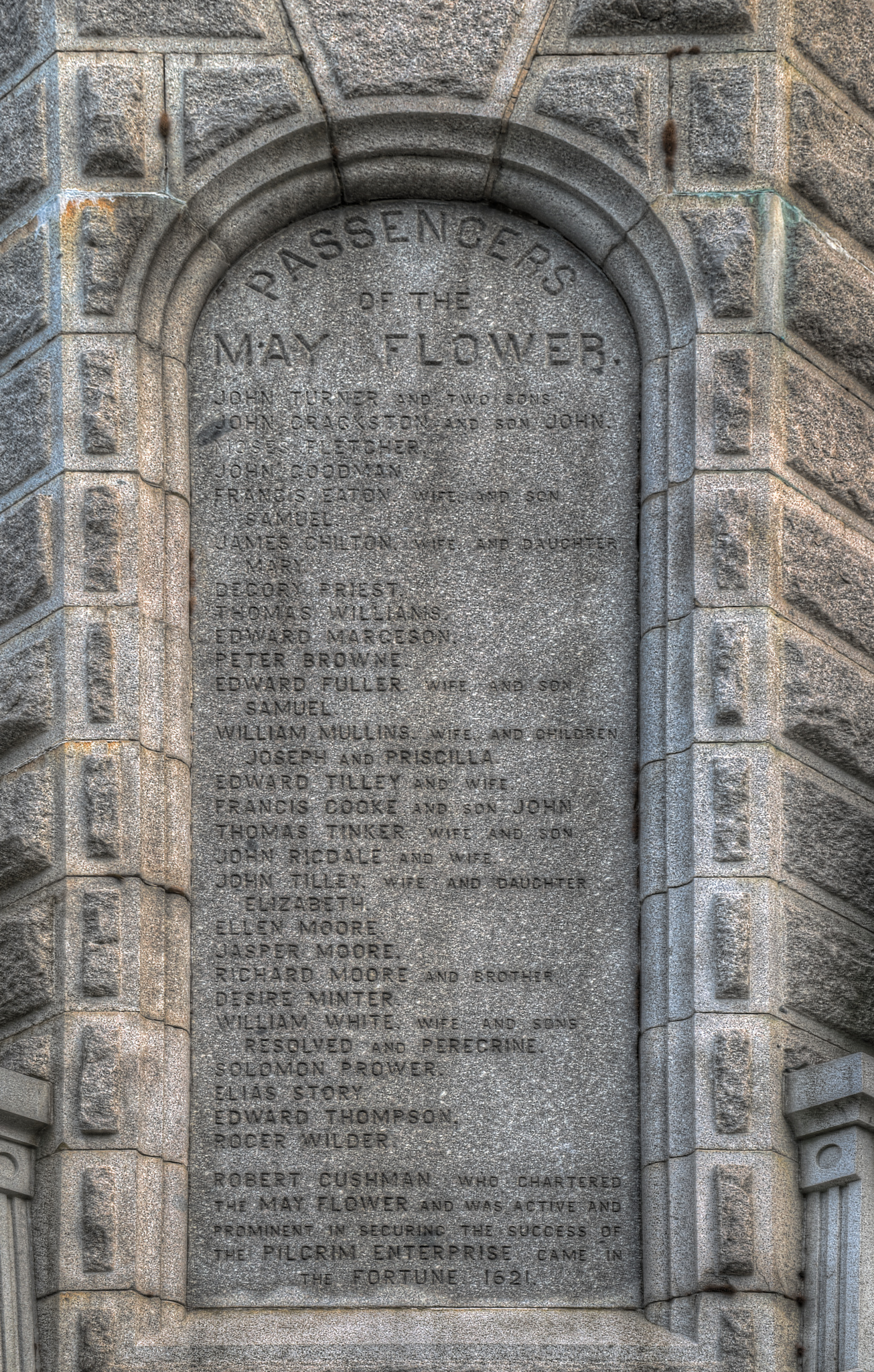
Passengers of the Mayflower (part 2)

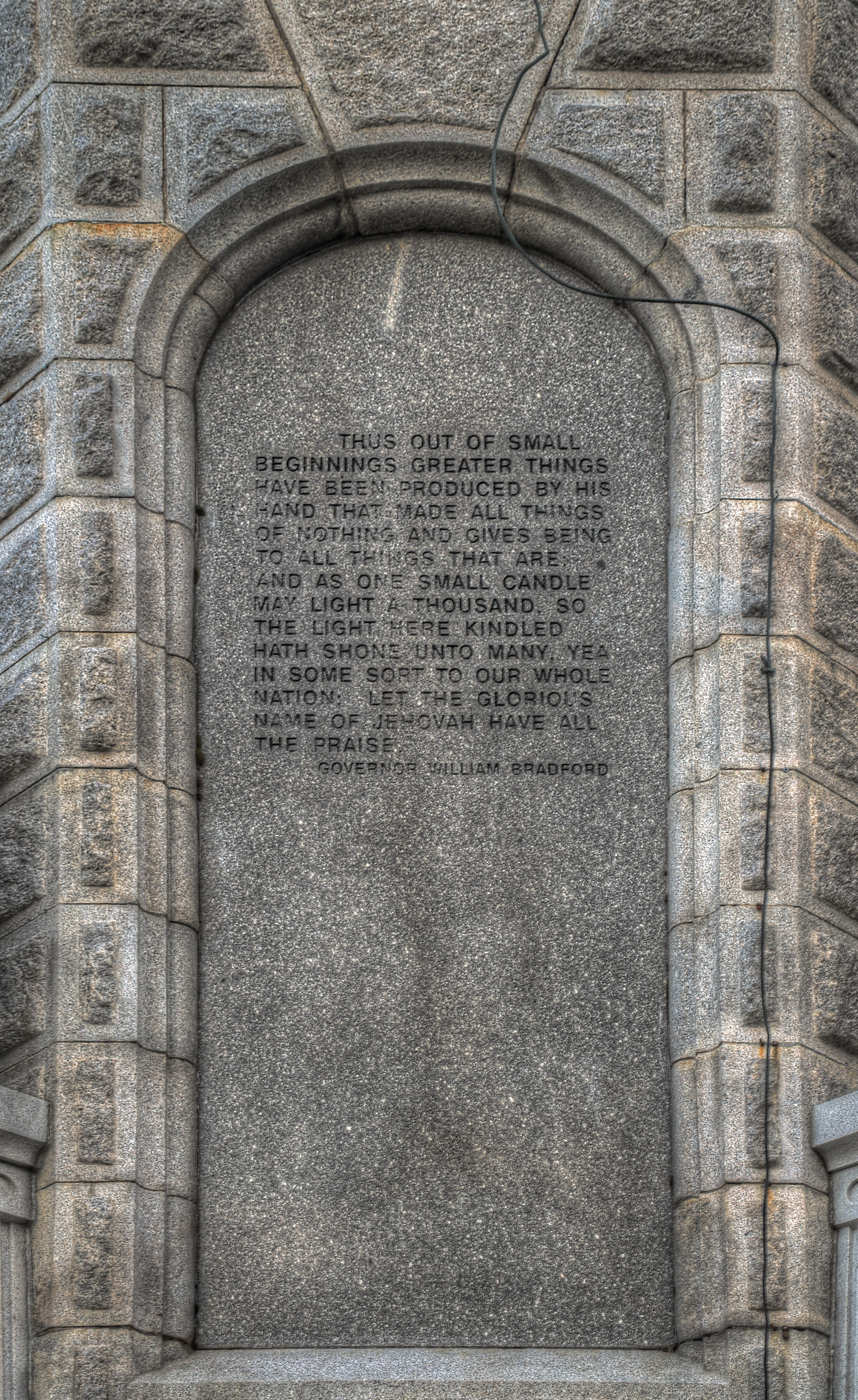
Detail of William Bradford quote

== See also ==
- Pilgrim Monument
- National Register of Historic Places listings in Plymouth County, Massachusetts
