= House at 170 Otis Street =

Historic house in Massachusetts, United States

- U.S. National Register of Historic Places
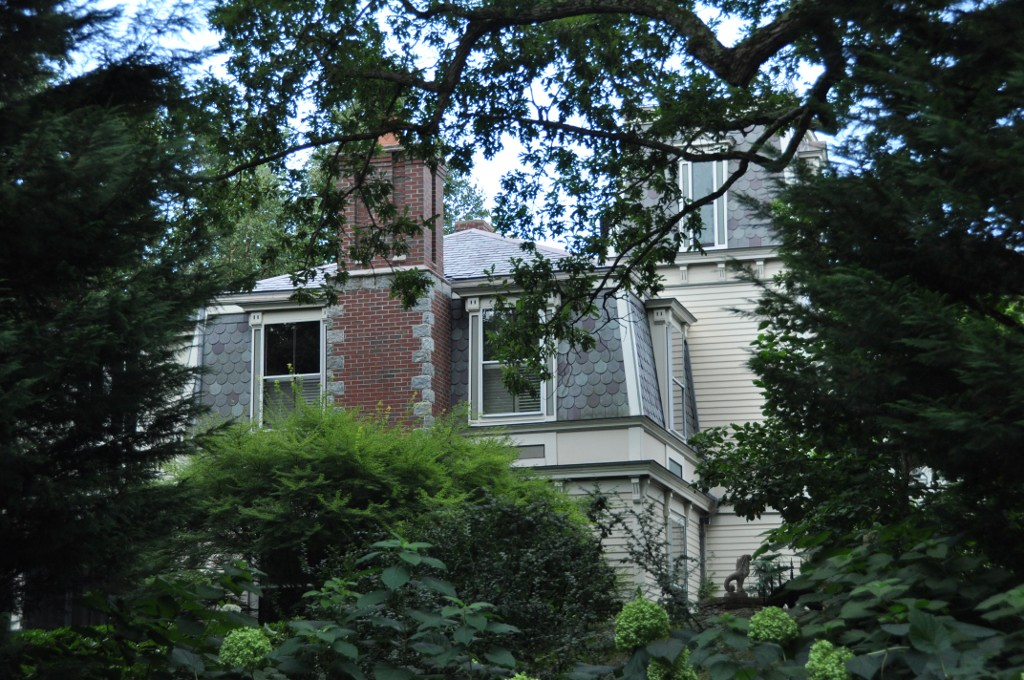

- Location within Massachusetts Location within the United States
- Location: 170 Otis St., Newton, Massachusetts
- Coordinates: 42°20′46″N 71°12′55″W
- Built: 1870
- Architect: Hammatt Billings
- Architectural style: Second Empire, Mansard
- MPS: Newton MRA
- NRHP reference No.: 86001819
- Added to NRHP: September 04, 1986

The House at 170 Otis Street in Newton, Massachusetts is a rare local work of the nationally known Boston architect Hammatt Billings. The two story Second Empire house was built in 1870–71 for Charles Ellis and Emma Claflin Ellis, the daughter of William Claflin, then Governor of Massachusetts, whose own home (no longer extant) was in Newtonville. The house's most prominent feature is its mansard-roofed 2 1/2-story tower, topped with iron cresting.

The house was listed on the National Register of Historic Places in 1986.

== See also ==
- National Register of Historic Places listings in Newton, Massachusetts
