= Wellesley Congregational Church and Cemetery =

Historic church in Massachusetts, United States

- U.S. National Register of Historic Places
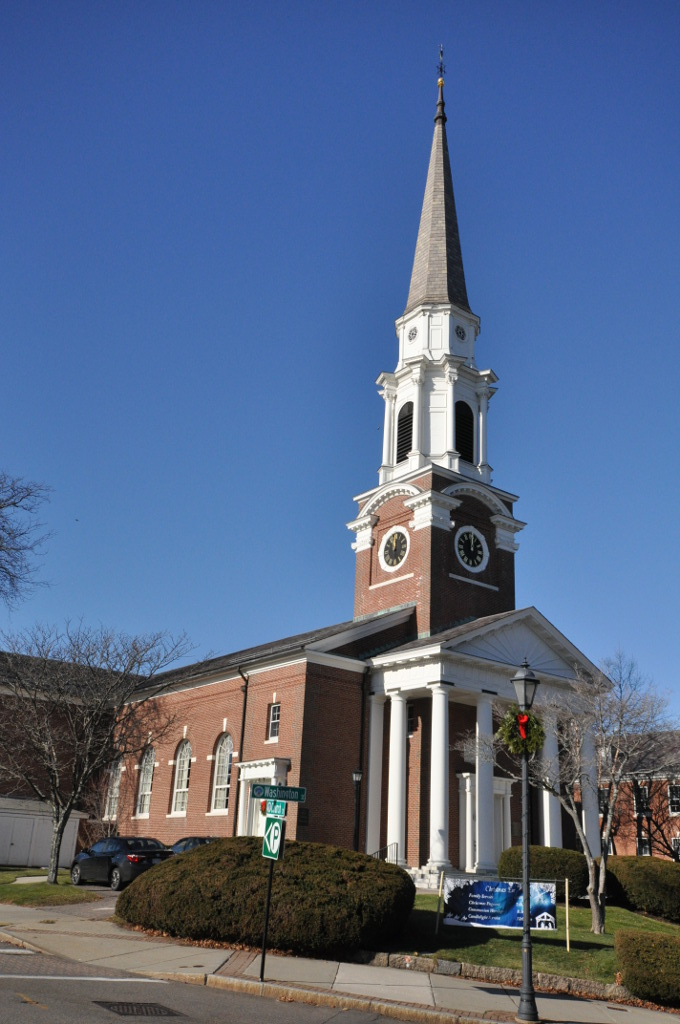

- Location within Massachusetts Location within the United States
- Location: 2 Central Street, Wellesley, Massachusetts
- Coordinates: 42°17′46″N 71°17′37″W
- Area: 2.33 acres (0.94 ha)
- Built: 1918
- Architect: Carrère and Hastings
- Architectural style: Georgial Revival
- NRHP reference No.: 14000696
- Added to NRHP: September 22, 2014

The Wellesley Congregational Church and Cemetery is a historic religious facility at 2 Central Street in the center of Wellesley, Massachusetts. The church is a brick Georgian Revival structure designed by Carrère and Hastings and built between 1918 and 1922. It is the fourth structure built for a congregation established in 1798, when the area was part of Newton. The church complex includes the main sanctuary and administrative offices and a chapel, all part of the original 1918 design, and a 1955 parish hall.

The property was listed the National Register of Historic Places in 2014.

== See also ==
- National Register of Historic Places listings in Norfolk County, Massachusetts
