= Odd Fellows Hall, Boston =

Coordinates: 42°20′41.89″N 71°4′12.23″W

Odd Fellows Hall (1872–1932) in Boston, Massachusetts, was built for the Independent Order of Odd Fellows, Grand Lodge of Massachusetts. It occupied a large lot in the South End, at no.515 Tremont Street at Berkeley Street. Architect Joseph Billings designed the structure which had several large meeting rooms: Covenant Hall, Encampment Hall, Friendship Hall, Oasis Hall. Tenants included Emerson College of Oratory. Among the events that took place in the hall: 1892 annual dinner of the Tremont House Waiters’ Association. In January 1932 fire destroyed the building.

== Images ==
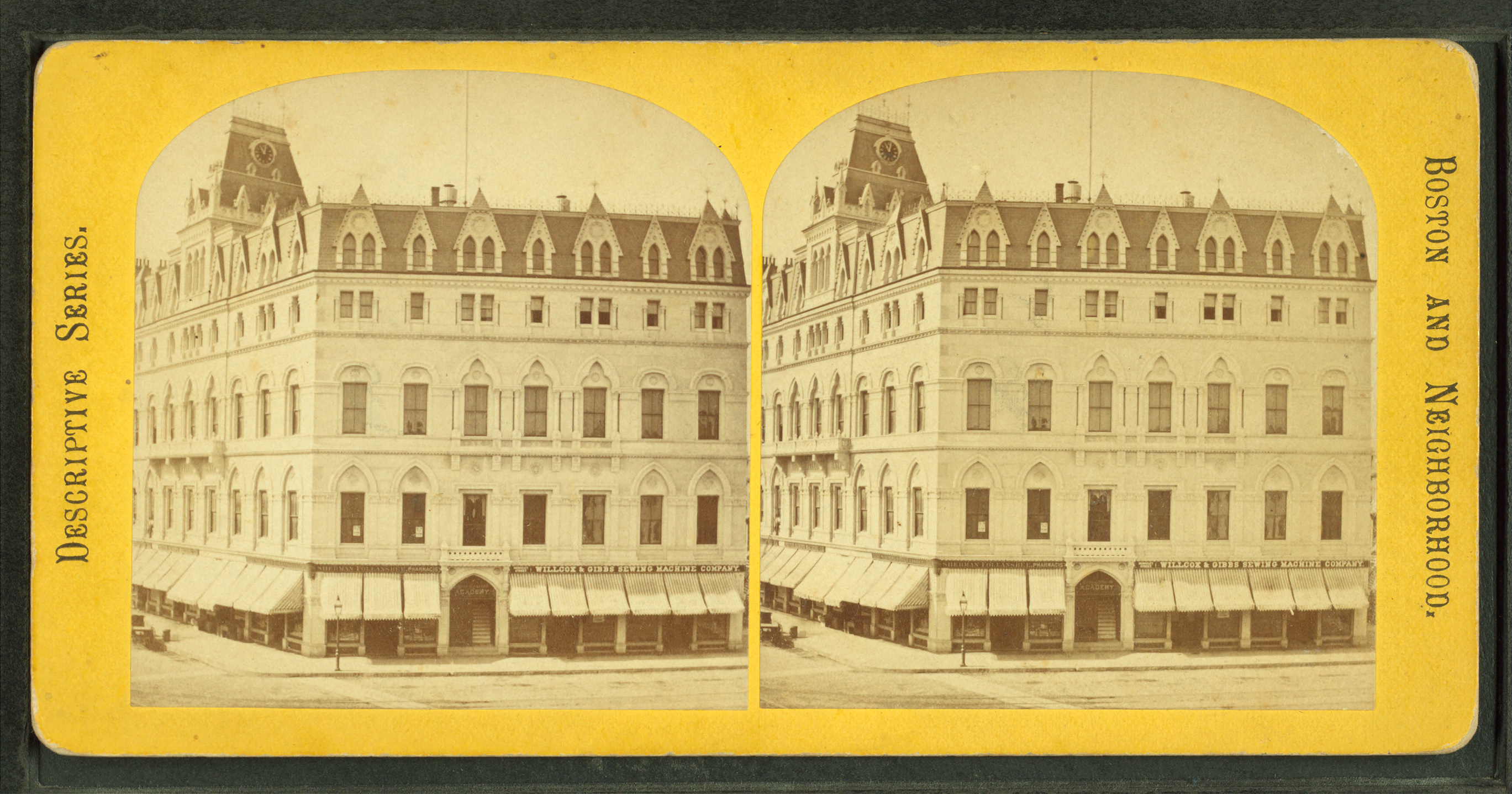
Odd Fellows Hall, corner Tremont and Berkeley Streets

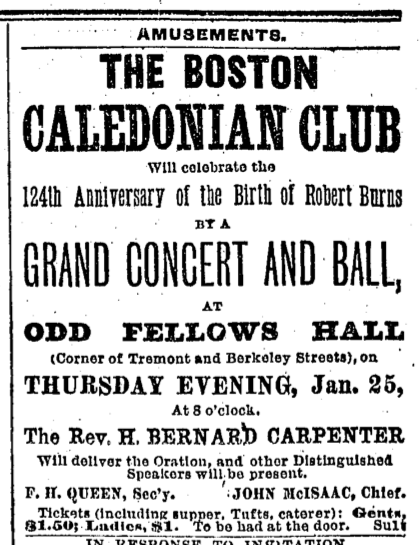
Advertisement for Caledonian Club event at Odd Fellows Hall, 1883

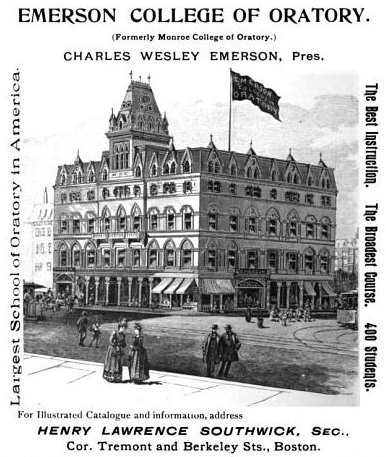
Advertisement for Emerson College of Oratory, 1893

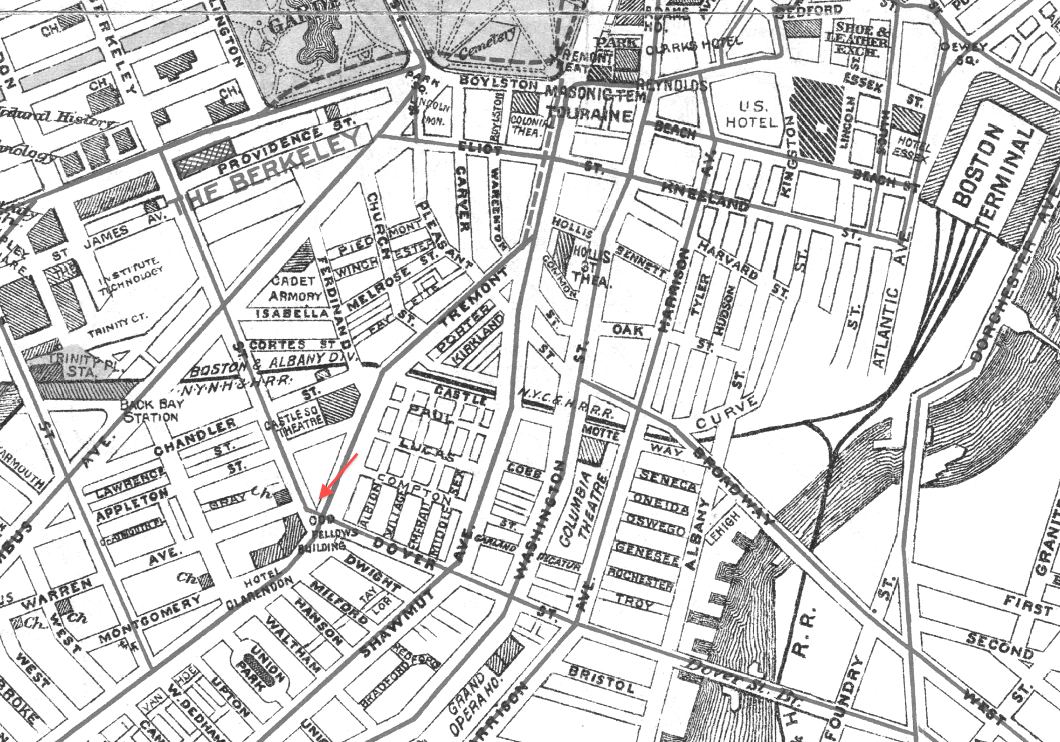
Detail of 1898 map of Boston, showing Odd Fellows Building

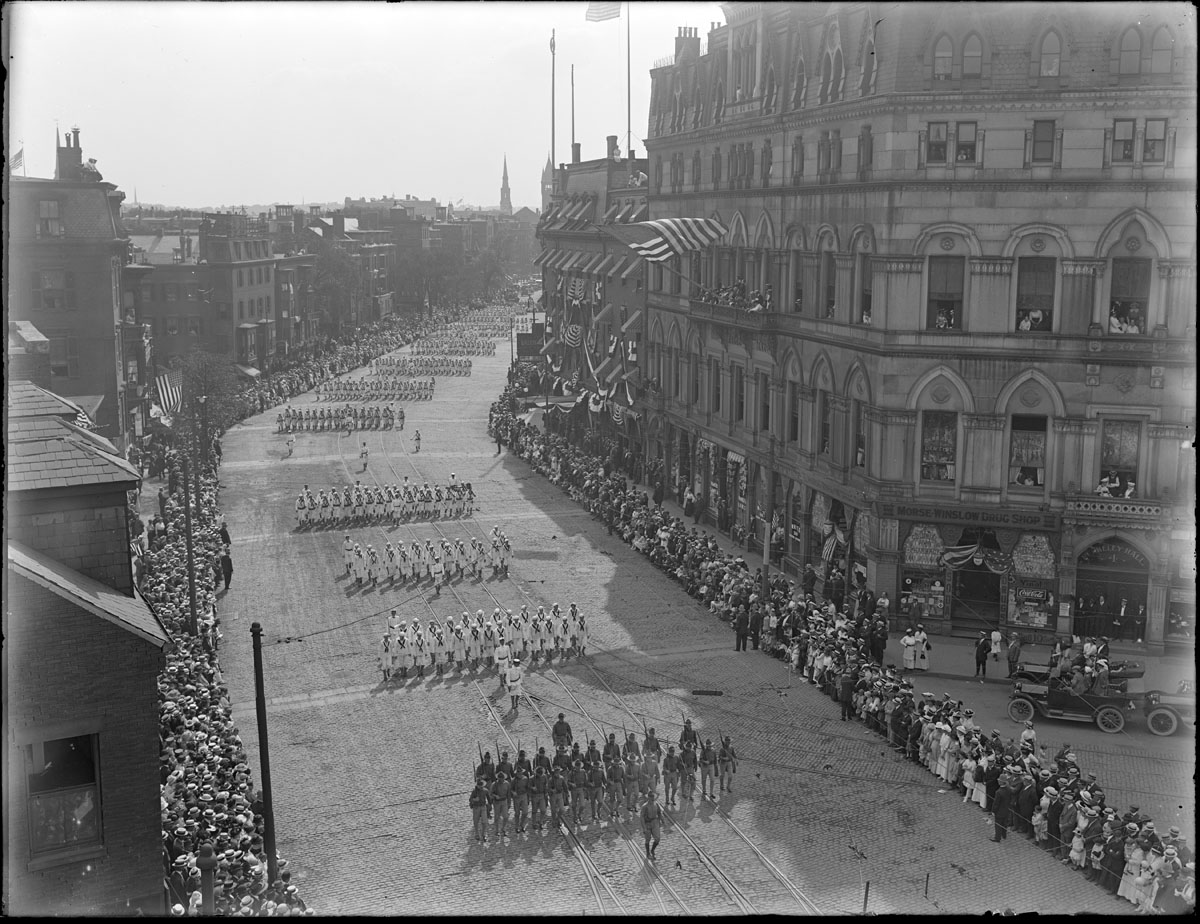
Army and Navy marching, first men to World War I, 1917; Odd Fellows Hall at right (Boston Public Library)
