= Wesleyan Building, Boston (Bromfield Street) =

Coordinates: 42°21′23.62″N 71°3′37.7″W

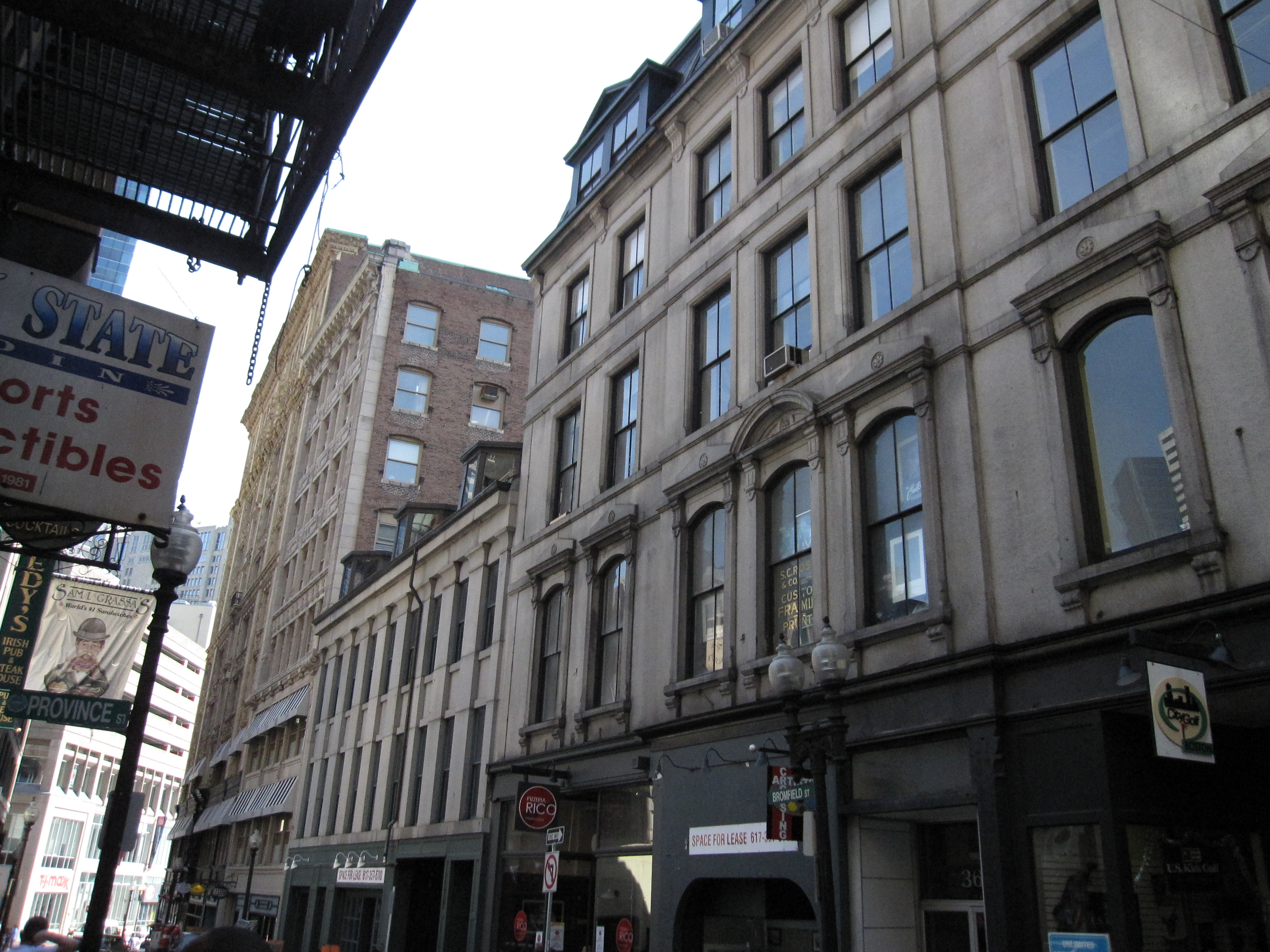
Wesleyan Building (at right), no.36 Bromfield St., Boston, 2010

The Wesleyan Building, formerly known as Wesleyan Hall, (est.1870) of Boston, Massachusetts, is located on Bromfield Street in the vicinity of Downtown Crossing. Architects Joseph Billings and Hammatt Billings designed it as the headquarters of the Methodist Boston Wesleyan Association. Tenants have included the New-England Methodist Historical Society; Zion's Herald; Woman's Foreign Missionary Society of the Methodist Episcopal Church; Boston Lyceum Bureau; Boston Theological Seminary; Boston University School of Law; Emerson College of Oratory; and Hudl. By 1912 the Methodists had moved to a new building on Copley Square.

== Images ==
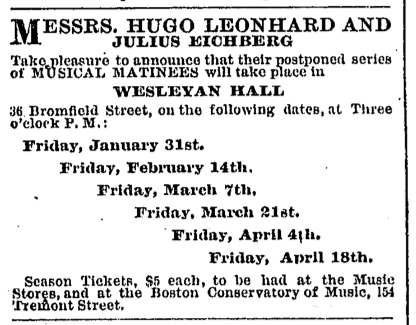
Advertisement for concert by Hugo Leonhard and Julius Eichberg, Wesleyan Hall, 1873

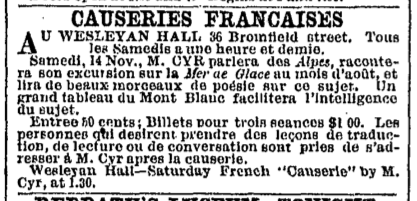
Advertisement, 1874

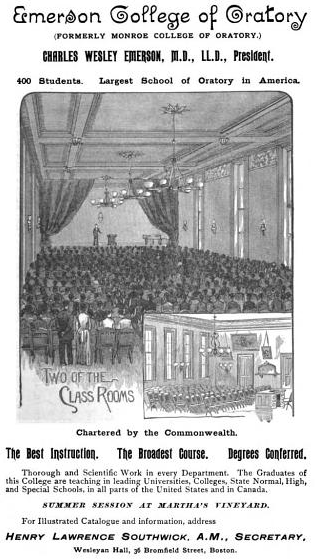
Advertisement for Emerson College of Oratory, 1891, with views of interior

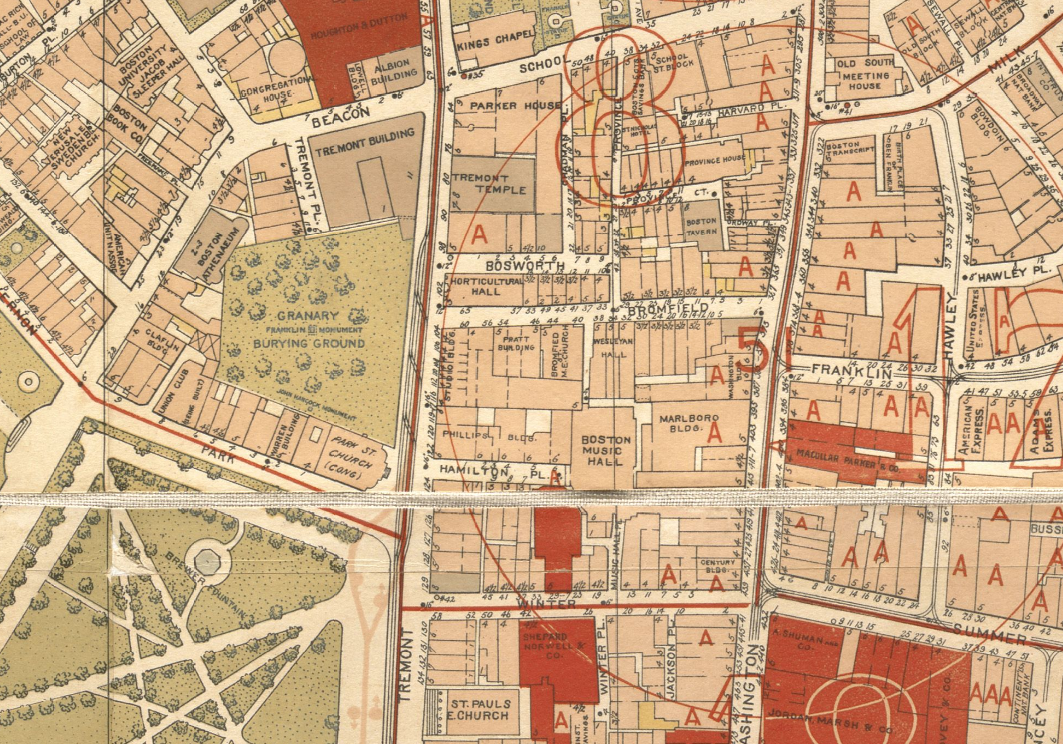
Detail of 1896 map of Boston showing Wesleyan Hall

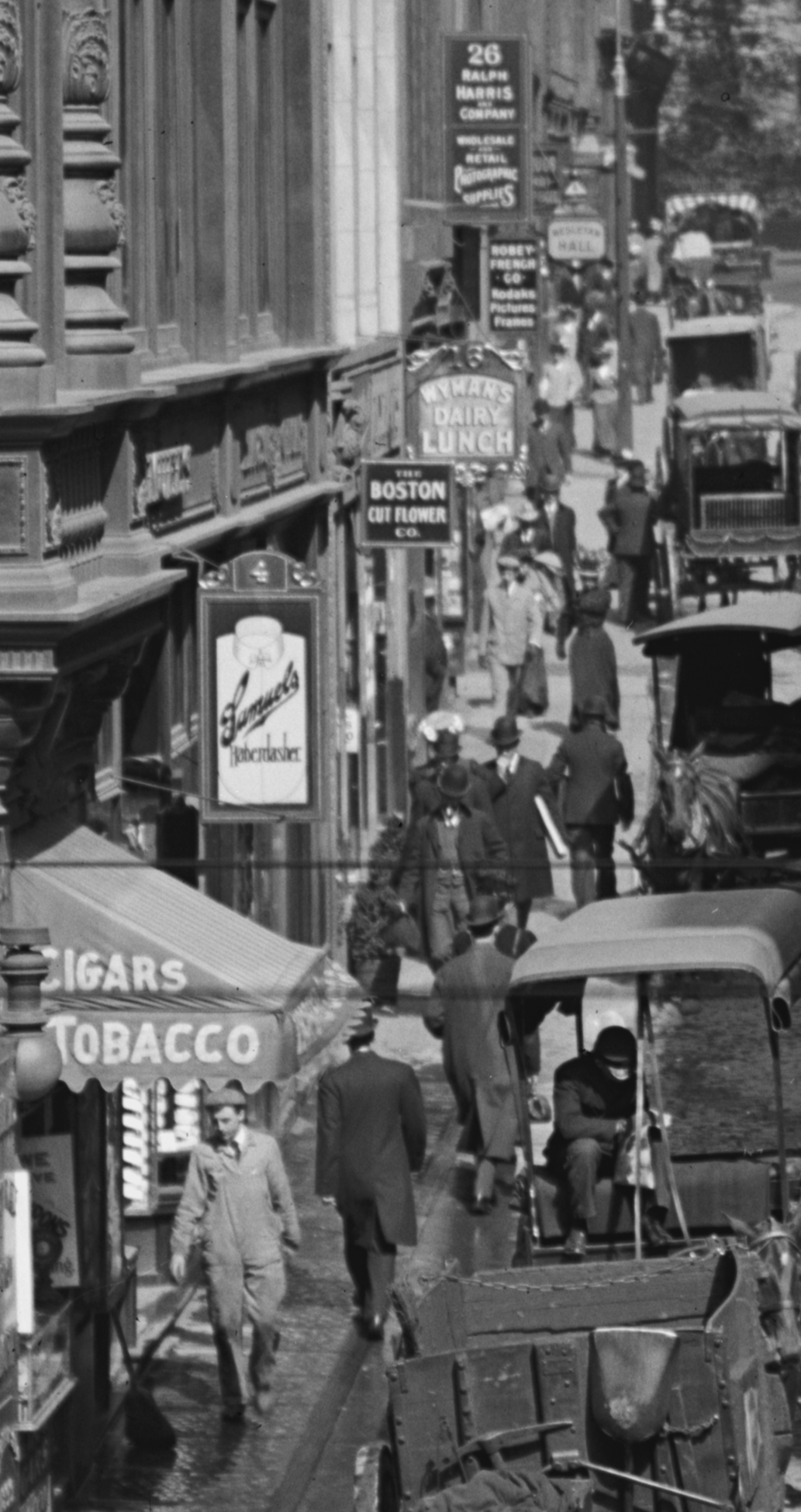
Bromfield Street, 1910, with glimpse of Wesleyan Hall sign
