= Superintendent (construction) =

Position in construction trades

On large construction projects, the superintendent's job is to run the day-to-day operations on the construction site and control the short-term schedule.

== Role ==
The role of the superintendent includes important quality control and subcontractor coordination responsibilities, as well as running the day-to-day operations on the construction site and controlling the short-term schedule. It is common for most finance-related tasks (especially labor and material cost control) and long-term scheduling to be handled by a project manager. The project manager and superintendent need to cooperate and share control effectively. Superintendents are almost universally stationed on the construction site, while project managers are usually based in the contractor's office with part-time on-site responsibilities.

=== Scope ===
On anything other than small projects, the superintendent is often assisted by a project engineer also employed by the construction company.

On very large projects, those generally in excess of $100m, there are multiple tiers of superintendents. These tiers are generally broken down into the following: program superintendent, super-structure superintendents, MEPF (mechanical, electrical, plumbing and fire protection) superintendents, interior superintendents, craft/trade superintendents and assistant superintendents. There is a similar tier for the project management side.

== Program superintendents ==
Program superintendents are responsible for the overall coordination and completion of the project through the direction of the second and third tiers of superintendents. Program superintendents commonly have very little hands on construction interaction due to delegation to other tier superintendents. The number of hours worked may reflect the tier of the superintendent, with program superintendents generally having a normal Monday through Friday (8:00am to 5:00pm) work schedule. The compensation package is also related to the tier level of the superintendent.

== Superintendents in Australia ==
In Australia, the common building contracts in use also have a superintendent. This is a person who represents the owner or principal and administers the contract terms and conditions. The responsibilities include: assessing and certifying claims for payment, extensions of time and variations to the contract. The superintendent is also responsible for confirming the builder's compliance with the requirements of the building contract and for answering queries in relation to contract matters or other matters related to the construction. The superintendent in a building contract usually comes from an architectural, quantity surveying or engineering background. As a particular note, in Australia in building projects, the superintendent is not the party responsible for co-ordination and scheduling of the trades and work of the contract; this is the responsibility of the head contractor, who will usually employ a site manager, overseen by a project manager, overseen by a construction manager and director.
