= 1867 Connecticut gubernatorial election =

- April 1, 1867
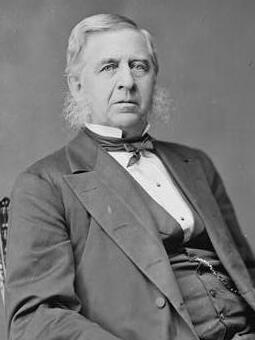

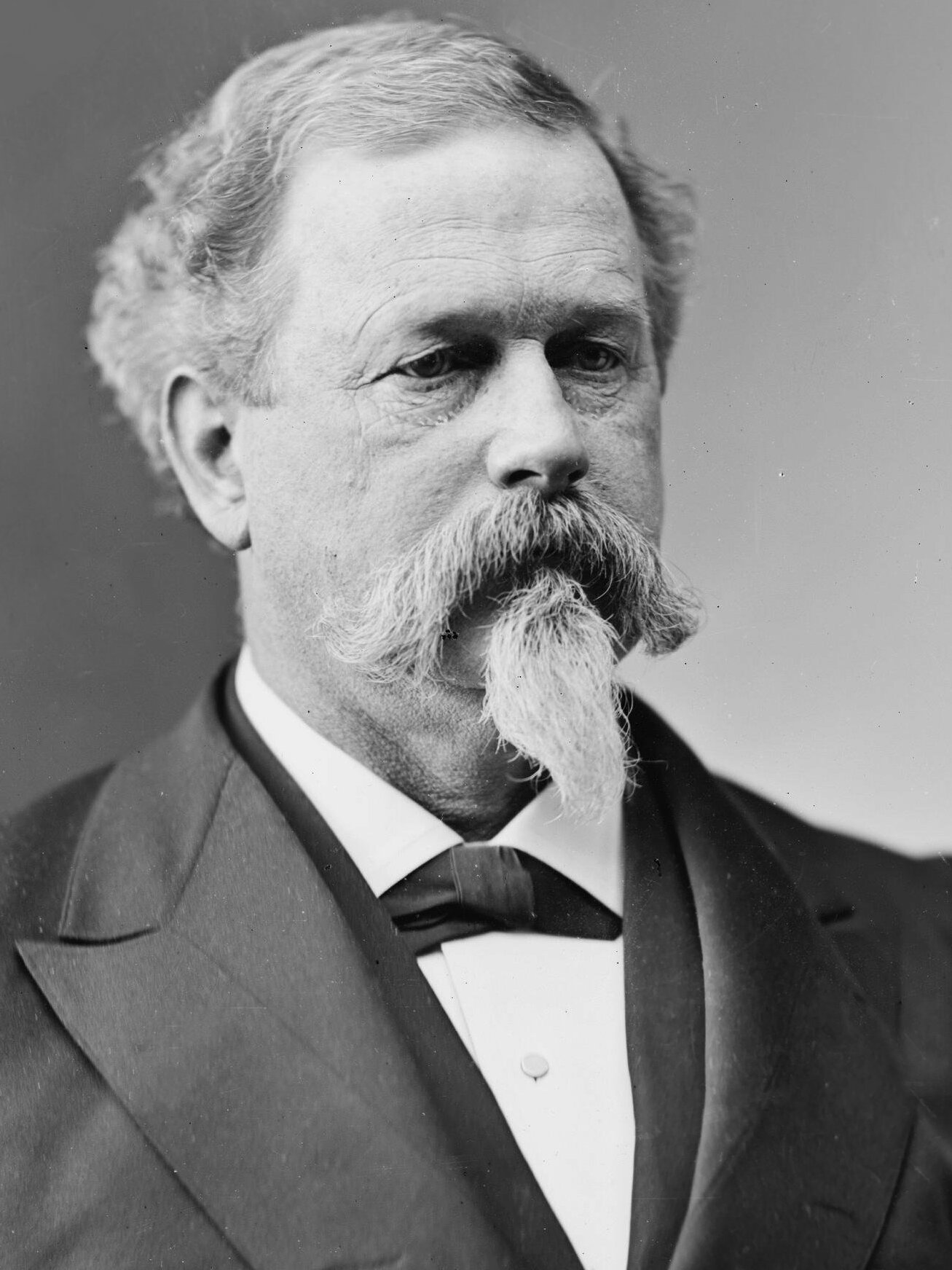
| Nominee | James E. English | Joseph Roswell Hawley |
| Party | Democratic | Republican |
| Popular vote | 47,565 | 46,578 |
| Percentage | 50.52% | 49.47% |
- English: 50–60% 60–70% 70–80% 80–90% Hawley: 50–60% 60–70% 70–80%
Governor before election
Joseph Roswell Hawley
Republican
Elected Governor
James E. English
Democratic

The 1867 Connecticut gubernatorial election was held on April 1, 1867. It was a rematch of the 1866 Connecticut gubernatorial election. Democratic nominee James E. English defeated incumbent governor, former Civil War general and Republican nominee Joseph Roswell Hawley with 50.52% of the vote.

The Republican convention held in New Haven on January 25 referred to itself as the "Union Republican" convention.

== General election ==
=== Candidates ===
Major party candidates

- James E. English, Democratic
- Joseph Roswell Hawley, Republican

=== Results ===
1867 Connecticut gubernatorial election
| Party | Candidate | Votes | % | ±% |
|---|---|---|---|---|
| Democratic | James E. English | 47,565 | 50.52% | |
| Republican | Joseph Roswell Hawley (incumbent) | 46,578 | 49.47% | |
| Other | Others | 11 | 0.01% | |
| Majority | | 987 | | |
| Turnout | | | | |
| Democratic gain from Republican | | Swing | | |
