= Cedar Hill Cemetery (Hartford, Connecticut) =

Historic rural cemetery

- U.S. National Register of Historic Places
- U.S. Historic district
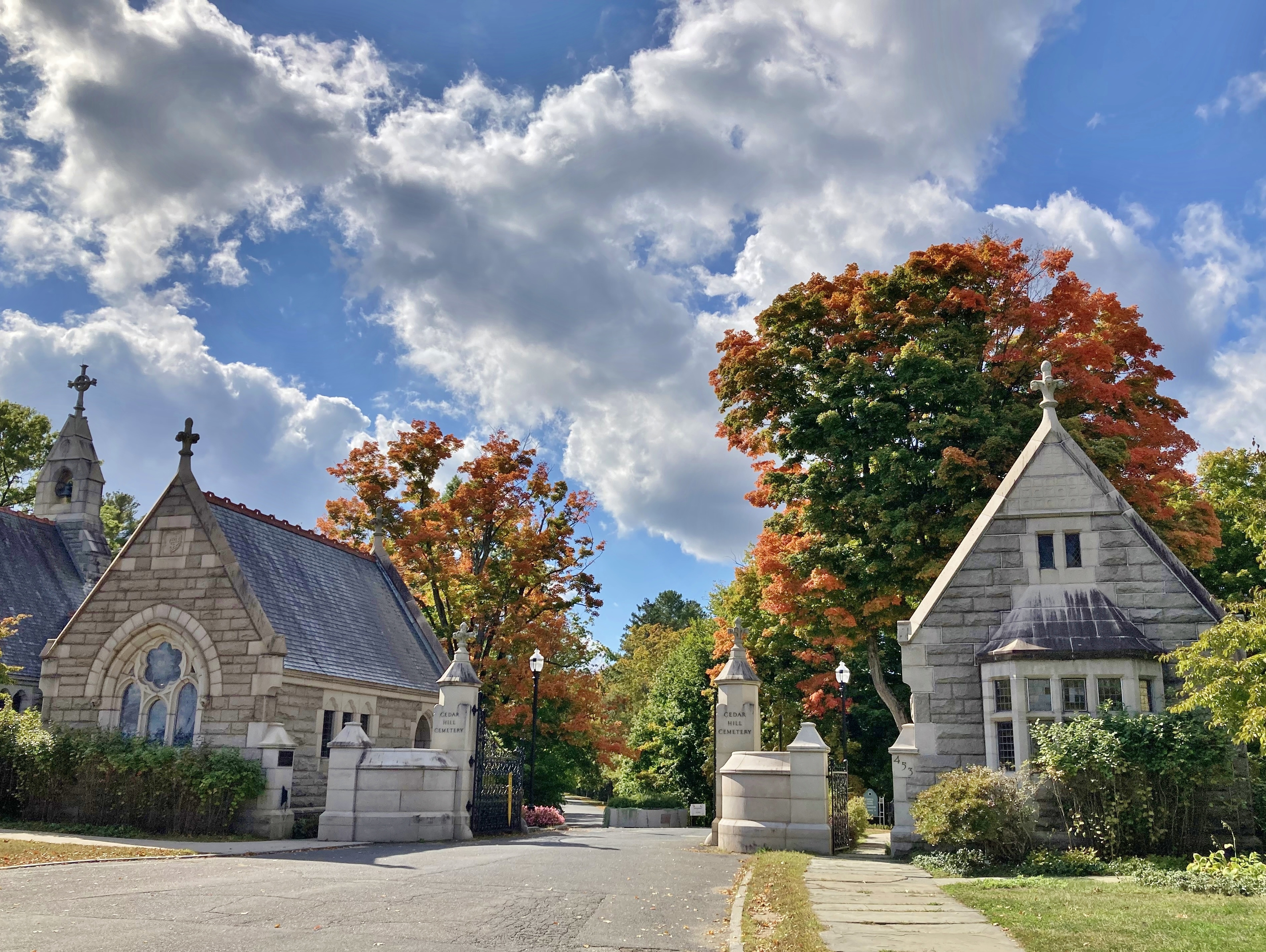
- Cemetery entrance at intersection of Fairfield and Maple Avenues in Hartford, CT

- Location within Connecticut Location within the United States
- Interactive map of Cedar Hill Cemetery
- Location: 453 Fairfield Avenue, in Hartford, Wethersfield, and Newington, Connecticut, US
- Coordinates: 41°43′20″N 72°42′12″W
- Built: 1865
- Architects: multiple, including Weidenmann, Jacob
- Architectural style: Gothic, Queen Anne, Modern Movement
- NRHP reference No.: 97000333
- Added to NRHP: April 28, 1997

Cedar Hill Cemetery in Hartford, Connecticut, United States, is located at 453 Fairfield Avenue. It was designed by landscape architect Jacob Weidenmann, who also designed Hartford's Bushnell Park. Its first sections were completed in 1866 and the first burial took place on July 17, 1866. Cedar Hill was designed as an American rural cemetery in the tradition of Mount Auburn Cemetery in Cambridge, Massachusetts.

The cemetery straddles three towns. It was listed on the National Register of Historic Places in 1997, in Hartford, Newington, and Wethersfield. It includes the Cedar Hill Cemetery Gateway and Chapel, also known as Northam Memorial Chapel and Gallup Memorial Gateway, which is separately listed on the NRHP.

Cedar Hill Cemetery encompasses 270 acres (110 ha) and includes several historic buildings, including the Northam Memorial Chapel (built 1882), which was designed by Hartford architect George Keller, and the Superintendent's Cottage (built in 1875), which continues to be occupied by Cedar Hill's Superintendent to this day.

The cemetery gates are open from 7:00 am to 8:00 pm, April - September, and from 7:00 am to 5:00 pm during all other months.

== Notable monuments ==
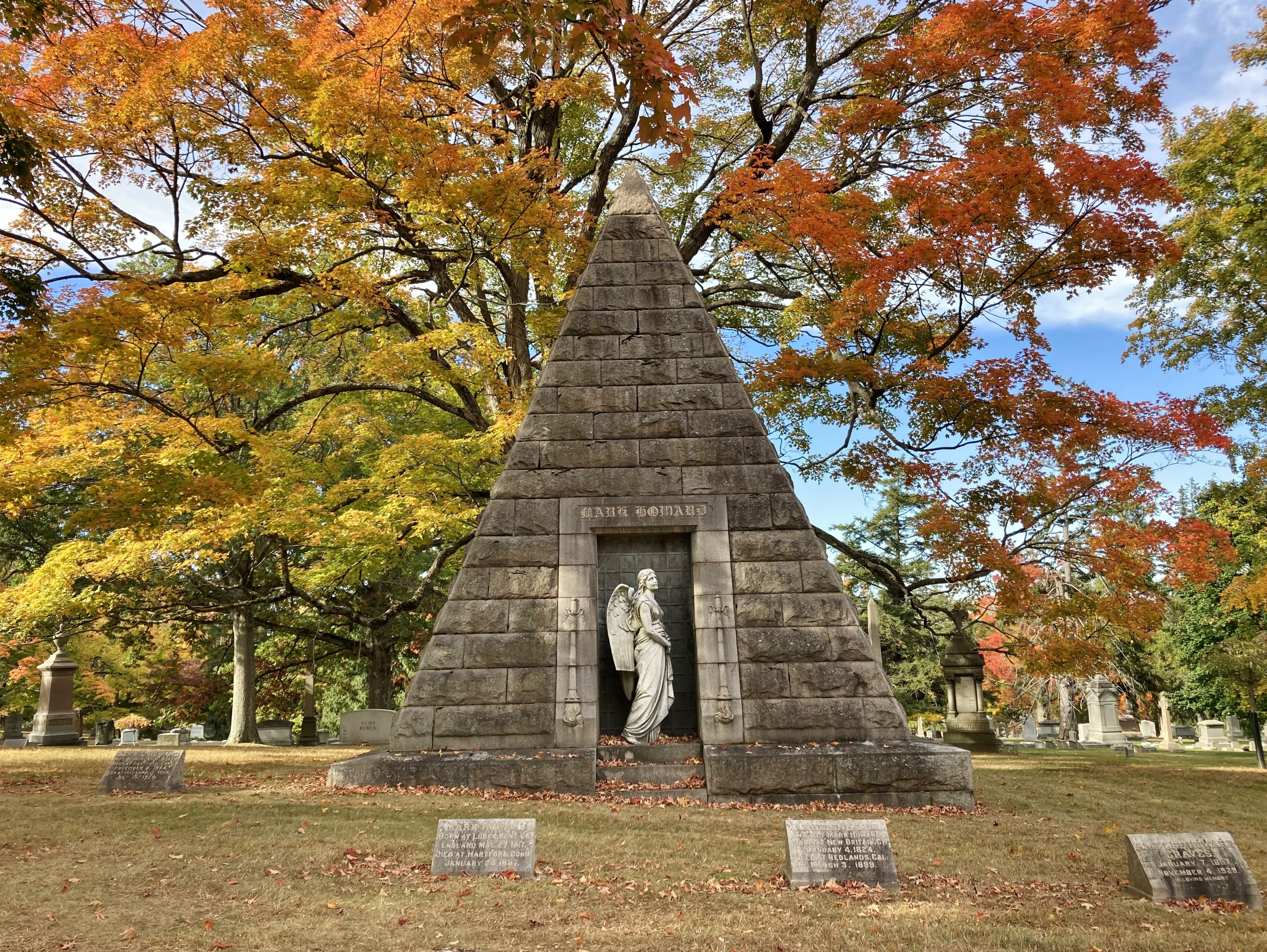
The Mark Howard monument, one of Cedar Hill's most famous

Cedar Hill has many unique monuments. One of the most recognizable is the 18-foot (5.5 m) tall pink-granite pyramid, and life-sized angel statue, erected in memory of Mark Howard and his wife, Angelina Lee Howard. Mark Howard was president of the National Fire Insurance Company of Hartford and Connecticut's first internal revenue collector.

John Pierpont Morgan's family monument was designed by architect George W. Keller. Made of either red Scottish or Nova Scotia granite, the monument was designed to portray Morgan's vision of the Ark of the Covenant.

The Porter-Valentine mausoleum features a stained-glass window created by Louis Comfort Tiffany.

== Notable burials ==
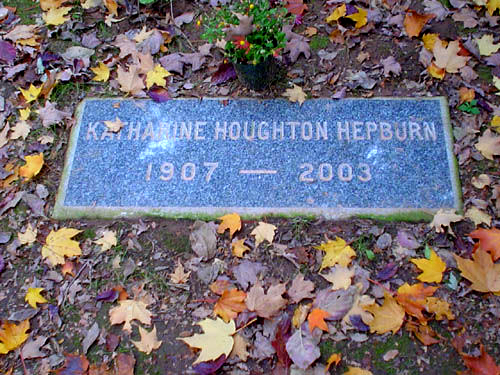
The grave of Katharine Hepburn

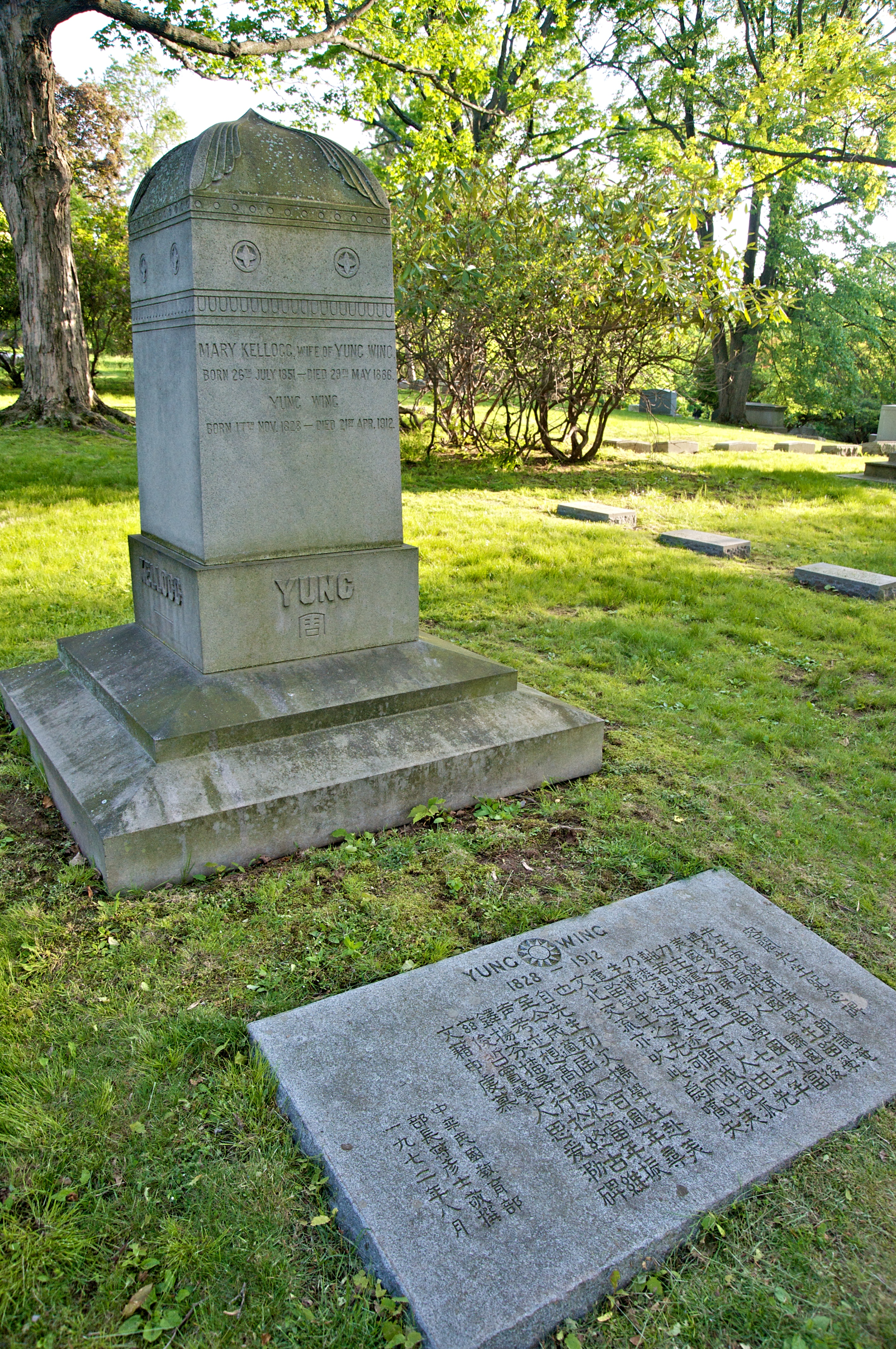
Family plot of Yung Wing, the first Chinese graduate of an American university, Yale

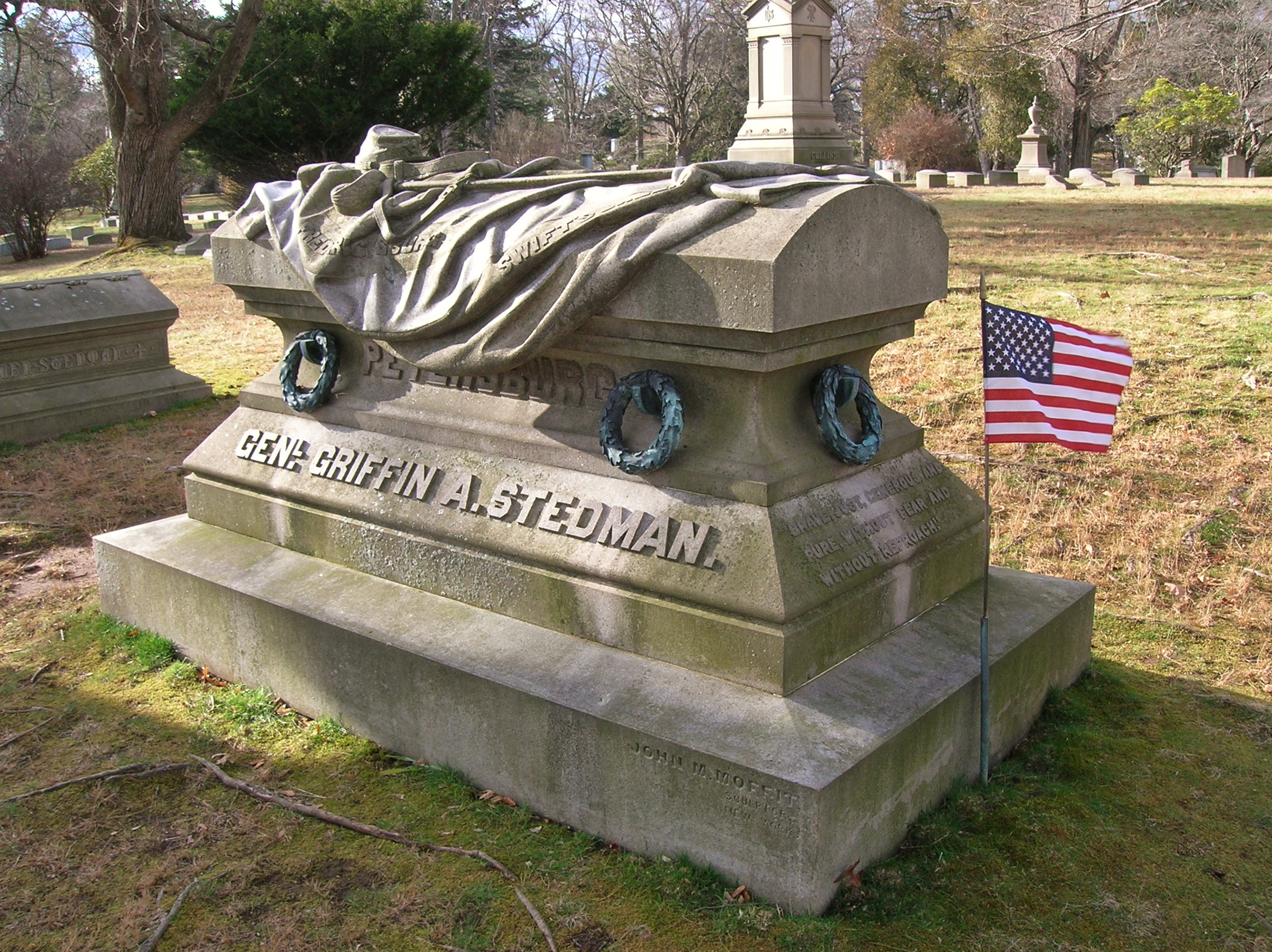
General Stedman Monument, sculpted by John M. Moffit

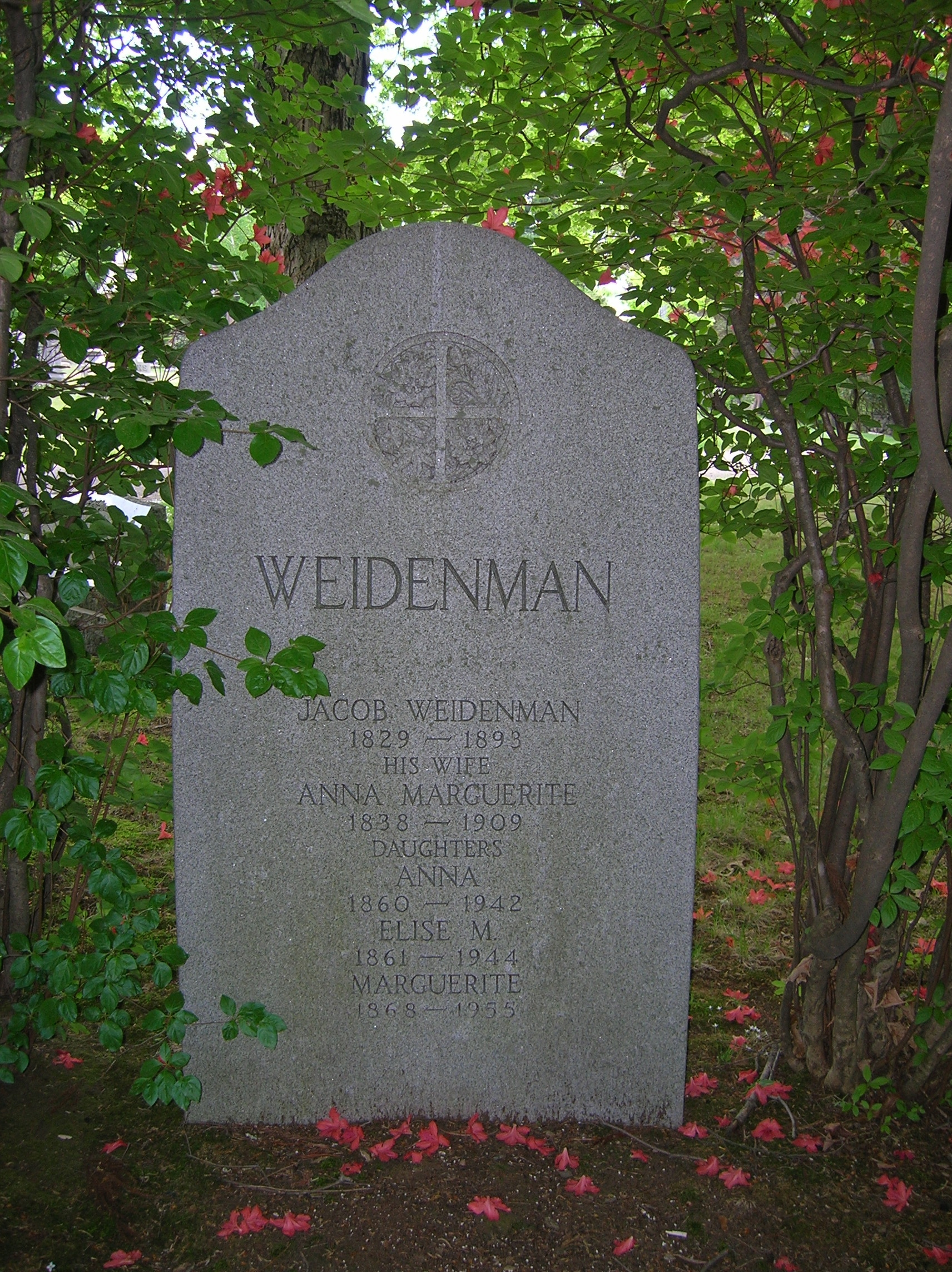
Weidenman family headstone

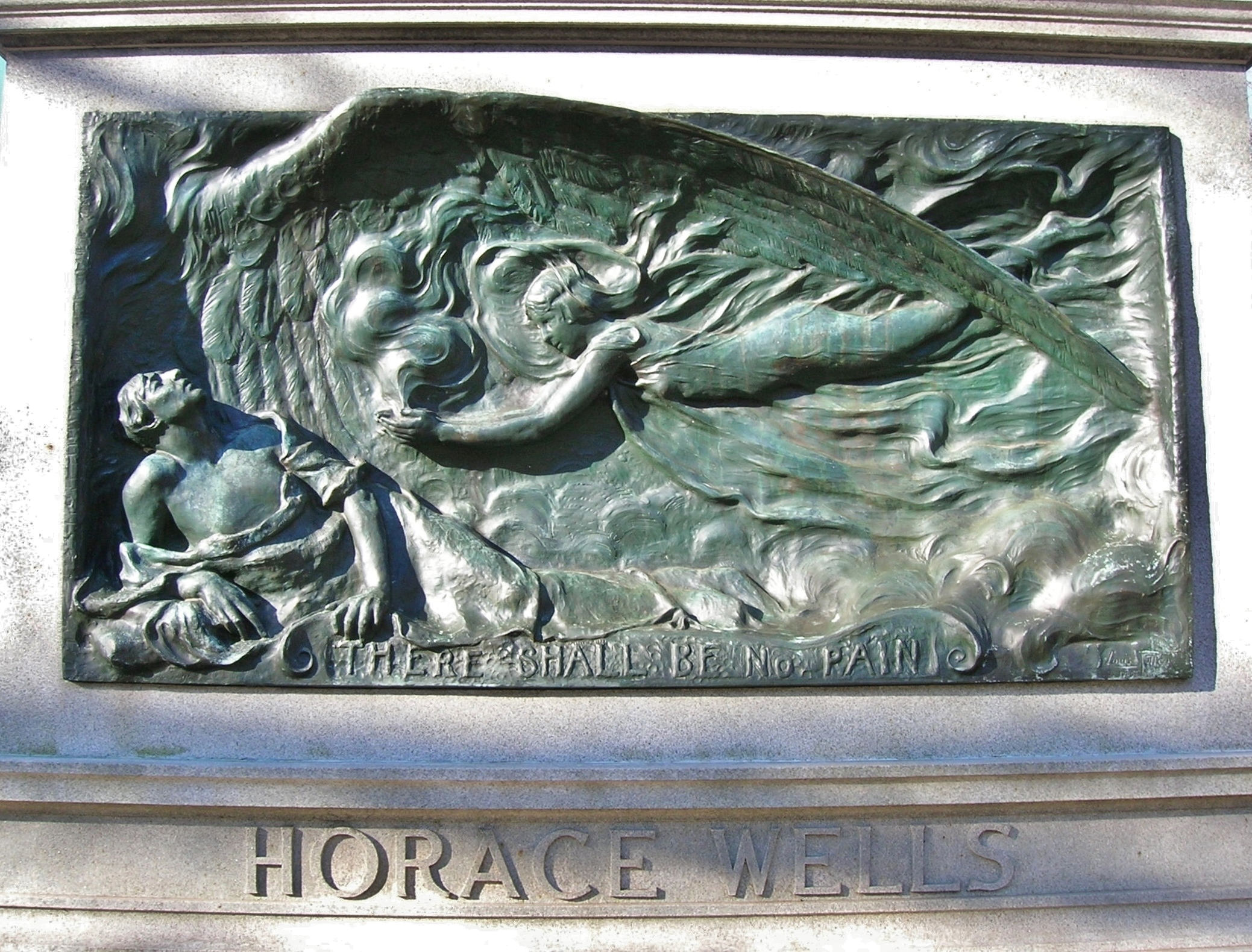
Horace Wells monument (1909), Louis Potter, sculptor

More than 30,000 people are buried at Cedar Hill Cemetery, including many notable people such as:

- Robert Downing Ames (1889–1931), actor
- Fern Andra (1893–1974), actress
- John Moran Bailey (1904–1975), Connecticut politician
- Henry Barnard (1811–1900), Connecticut educator
- James Goodwin Batterson, Connecticut businessman
- Charles E. Billings (1834–1920), engineer, inventor and businessman
- Thomas Church Brownell, founder of Trinity College
- John R. Buck, U.S. Congressman
- Francis M. Bunce, U.S. Navy rear admiral
- Eliphalet Adams Bulkeley, Connecticut businessman
- Morgan Gardner Bulkeley, Governor of Connecticut and member of the Baseball Hall of Fame
- Ernest Cady (1842–1908), 45th Lieutenant Governor of Connecticut
- George Capewell, Connecticut businessman
- Charles Chapman (1799–1869), U.S. Congressman
- William Closson, artist
- Emily Parmely Collins (1814–1909), suffragist, activist, writer
- Elizabeth Jarvis Colt, Connecticut business woman
- Samuel Colt, inventor of the Colt revolver
- Helen Curry (1896–1931), stage actress
- Katharine Seymour Day (1870–1964)
- Charles Bancroft Dillingham, Broadway producer
- James Dixon (1814–1873), U.S. Congressman and Senator
- Virginia Dox, frontier educator and popular lecturer
- Johnny Duke or Giulio Gallucci (1924–2006), professional boxer and coach
- Robert G. Erwin (1854–1906), lawyer
- Edward Miner Gallaudet, teacher
- Sophia Fowler Gallaudet, teacher
- Thomas Hopkins Gallaudet, educator of the deaf
- William James Glackens (1870–1938), artist
- Annie Warburton Goodrich, nurse, first dean of Yale University School of Nursing
- Charles Keeney Hamilton, aviator
- Joseph Roswell Hawley, Governor of Connecticut
- Katharine Hepburn (1907–2003), actress
- Katharine Houghton Hepburn (1878–1951), women's rights legal activist
- Isabella Beecher Hooker (1822–1907), women's rights legal activist
- Richard D. Hubbard (1818–1884), U.S. Congressman and 48th Governor of Connecticut
- Richard Jarvis (1829–1903), president of Colt Firearms
- Marshall Jewell (1825–1883), Connecticut businessman.
- Mary Goodrich Jenson, aircraft pilot
- John James McCook (1843–1927), professor and theologian
- Anne Morgan (1873–1952), philanthropist
- Edwin Denison Morgan (1811–1883), United States Senator
- Junius Spencer Morgan, financier
- John Pierpont Morgan Sr., financier
- Jane Norton Grew Morgan (1868–1925), socialite and wife of J.P. Morgan, Jr.
- Benjamin Wistar Morris (1870–1944), architect
- Frederick E. Olmsted (1872–1925), forester
- Peter Davis Oakley (1861–1920), U.S. Representative
- Francis Ashbury Pratt, inventor
- Henry Roberts (1853–1929), Governor of Connecticut from 1905 to 1907
- Thomas Henry Seymour, Governor of Connecticut
- Nathaniel Shipman (1828–1906), U.S. Circuit Judge
- Virginia Thrall Smith, children's rights legal advocate
- Griffin Alexander Stedman, United States Civil War general of the Battle of Fort Stedman. The General Stedman monument was sculpted by John M. Moffit.
- Wallace Stevens (1879–1955), poet
- Julius L. Strong (1828–1872), U.S. Congressman
- Allen Butler Talcott, artist
- Isaac Toucey, Secretary of the Navy
- Reverend Joseph Hopkins Twichell, theologian
- Robert Ogden Tyler, Civil War general
- Edward Sims Van Zile (1863–1931), author
- Loren P. Waldo (1802–1881), U.S. Congressman
- Charles Dudley Warner, writer
- Jacob Weidenmann (1829–1893), Switzerland-born landscape architect
- Gideon Welles (1802–1878), Secretary of the Navy under Abraham Lincoln
- Horace Wells, discoverer of anesthesia
- Amos Whitney, inventor
- Yung Wing (1828–1912), first Chinese graduate of Yale University

== Monuments ==
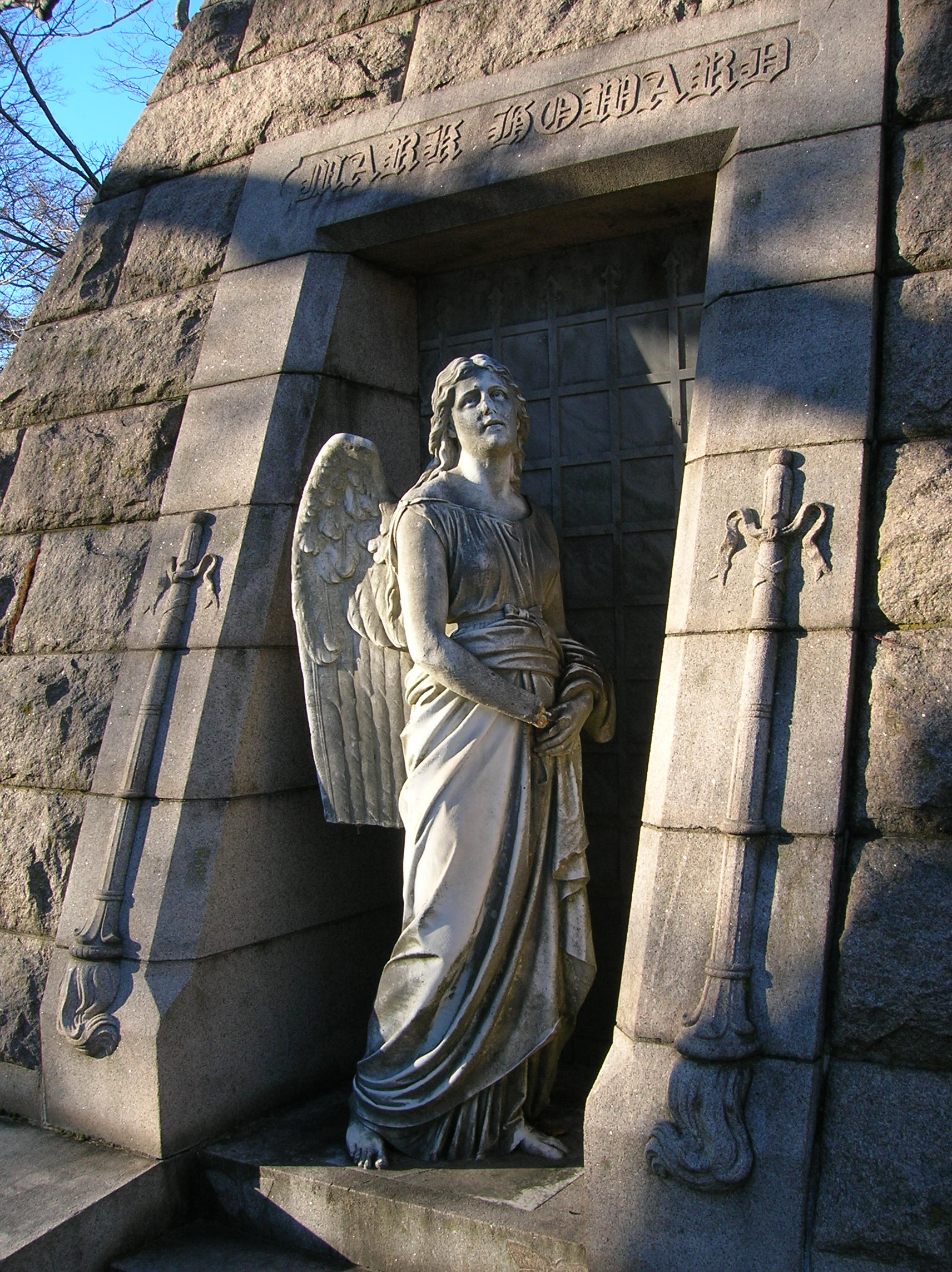
Angel sculpture, Mark Howard monument

Cynthia Talcott monument

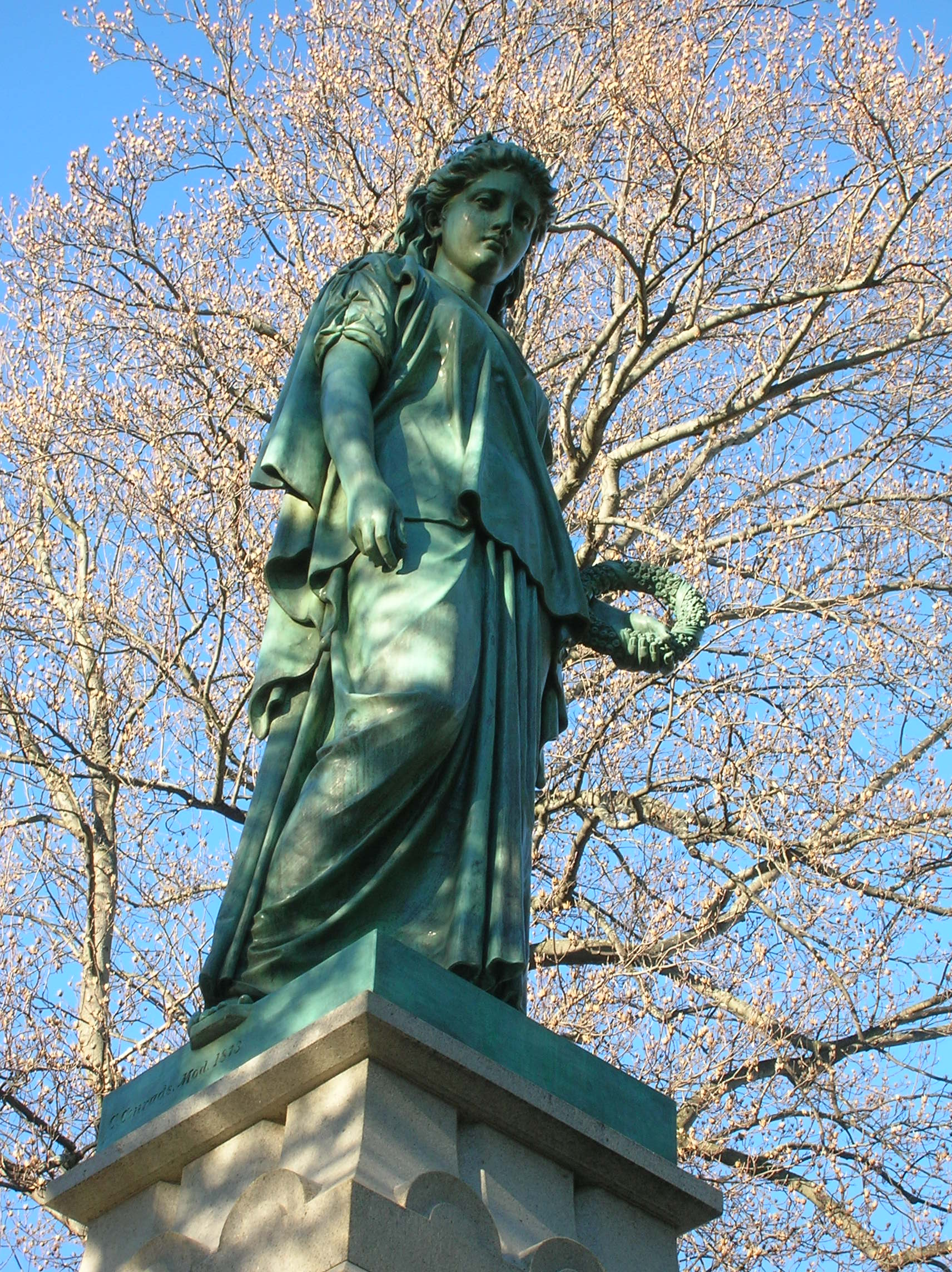
Statue atop Oswin Welles monument, sculpted by Carl Conrads (1873)

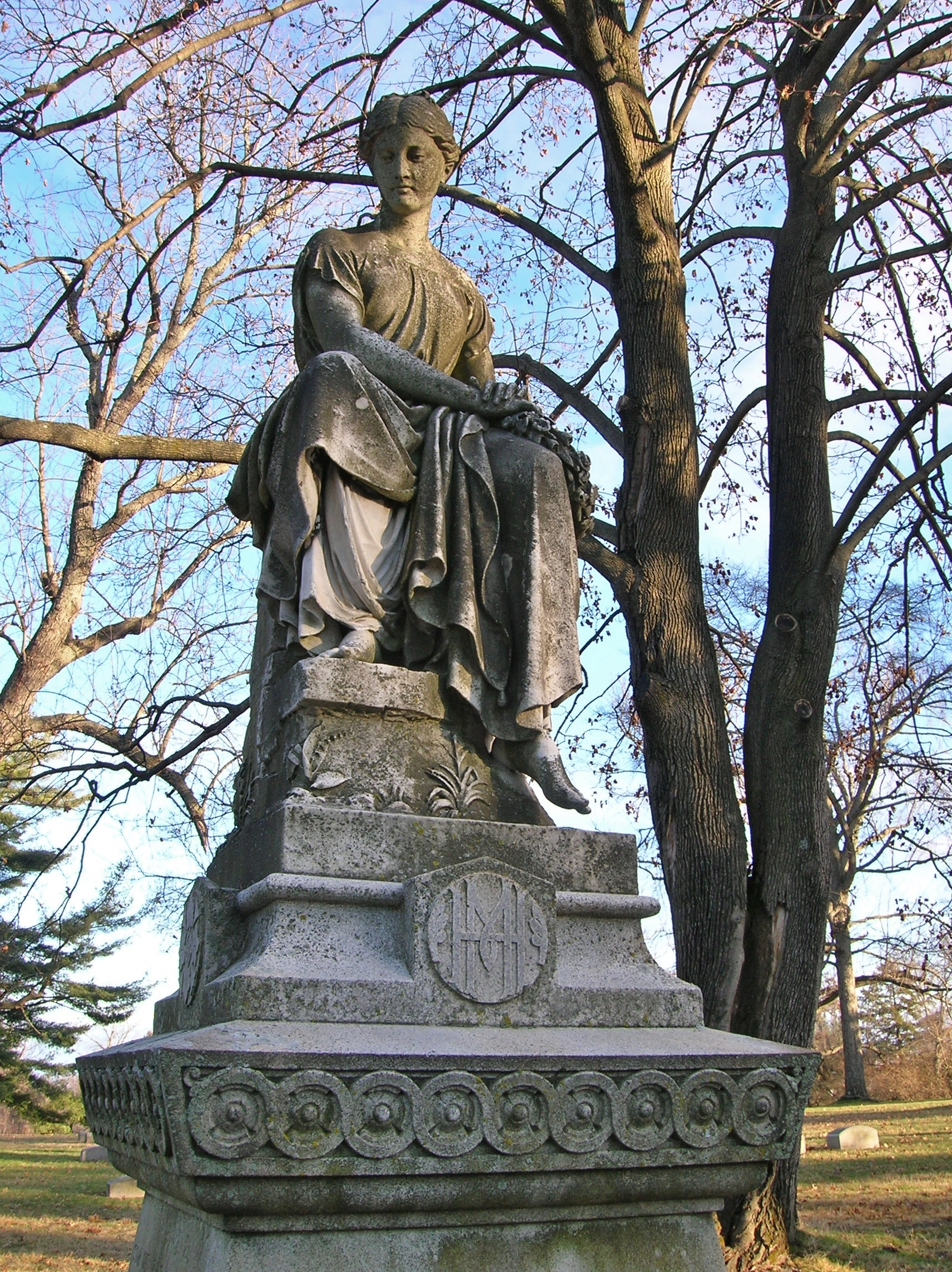
Hunt family monument, sculpted by Carl Conrads

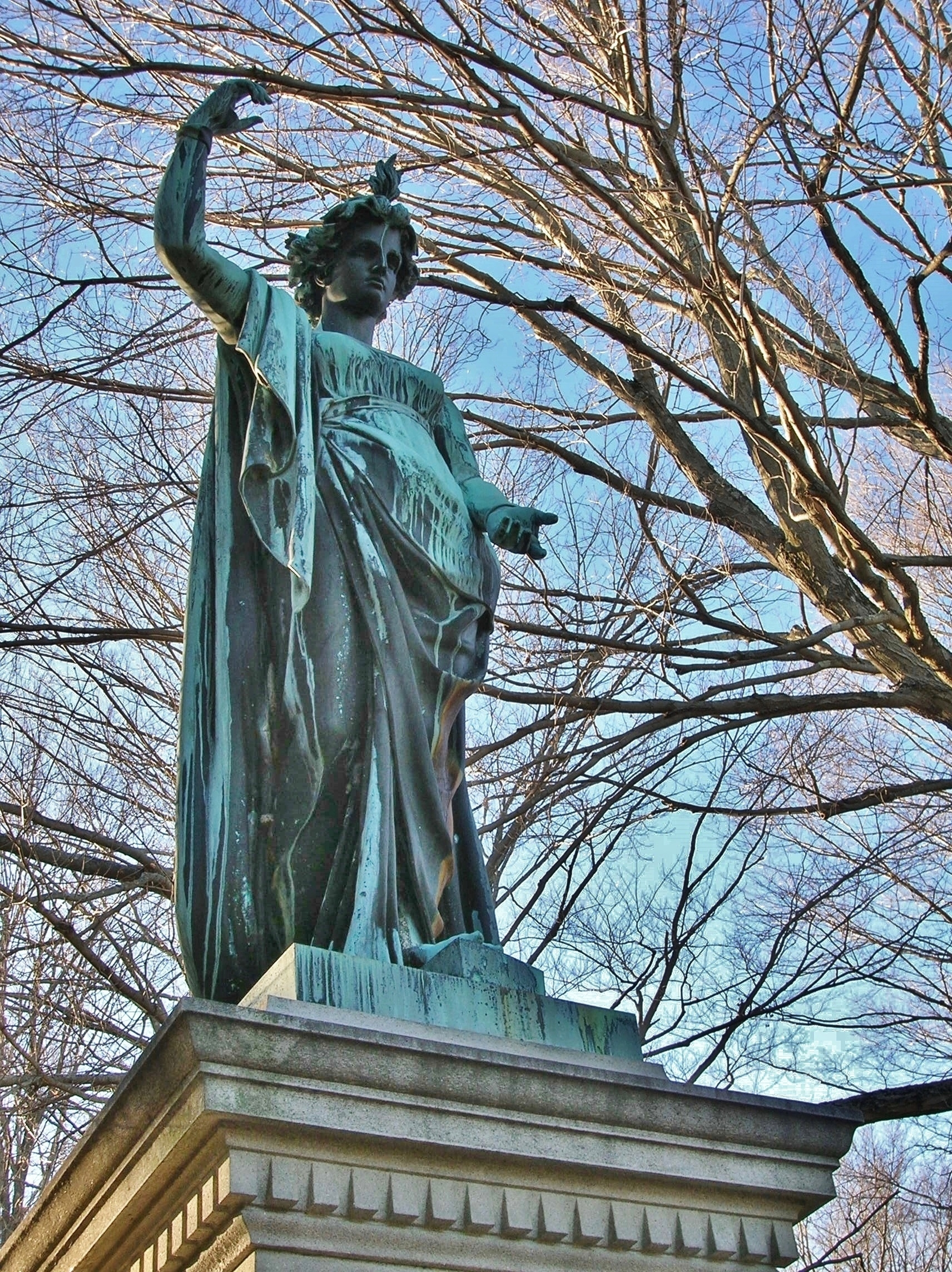
Statue atop Clark family monument, designed by Truman Howe Bartlett (1868) and sculpted by Ferdinand von Miller (1869)

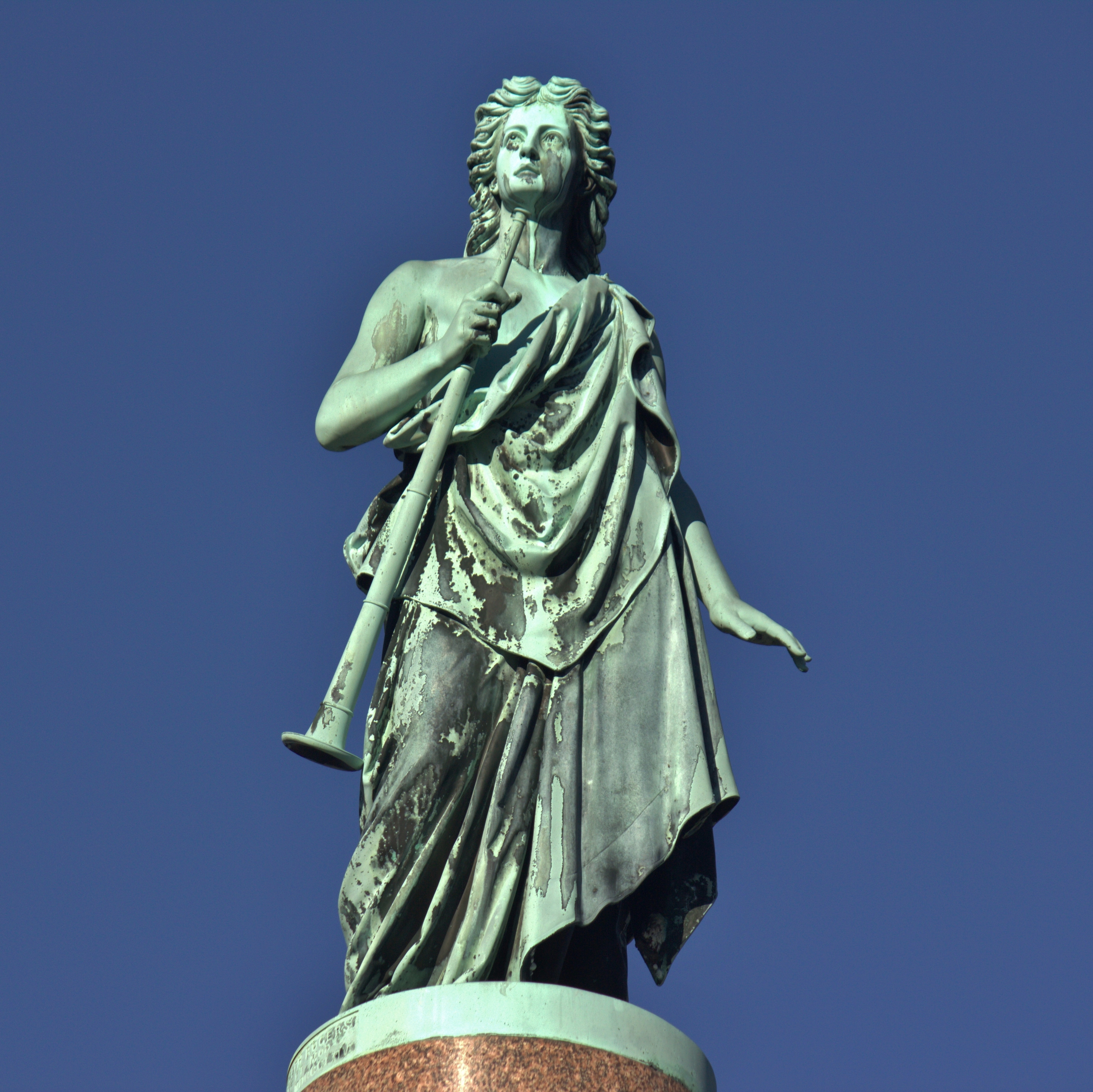
Angel of the Resurrection atop Colt family monument, sculpted by Randolph Rogers (1864)

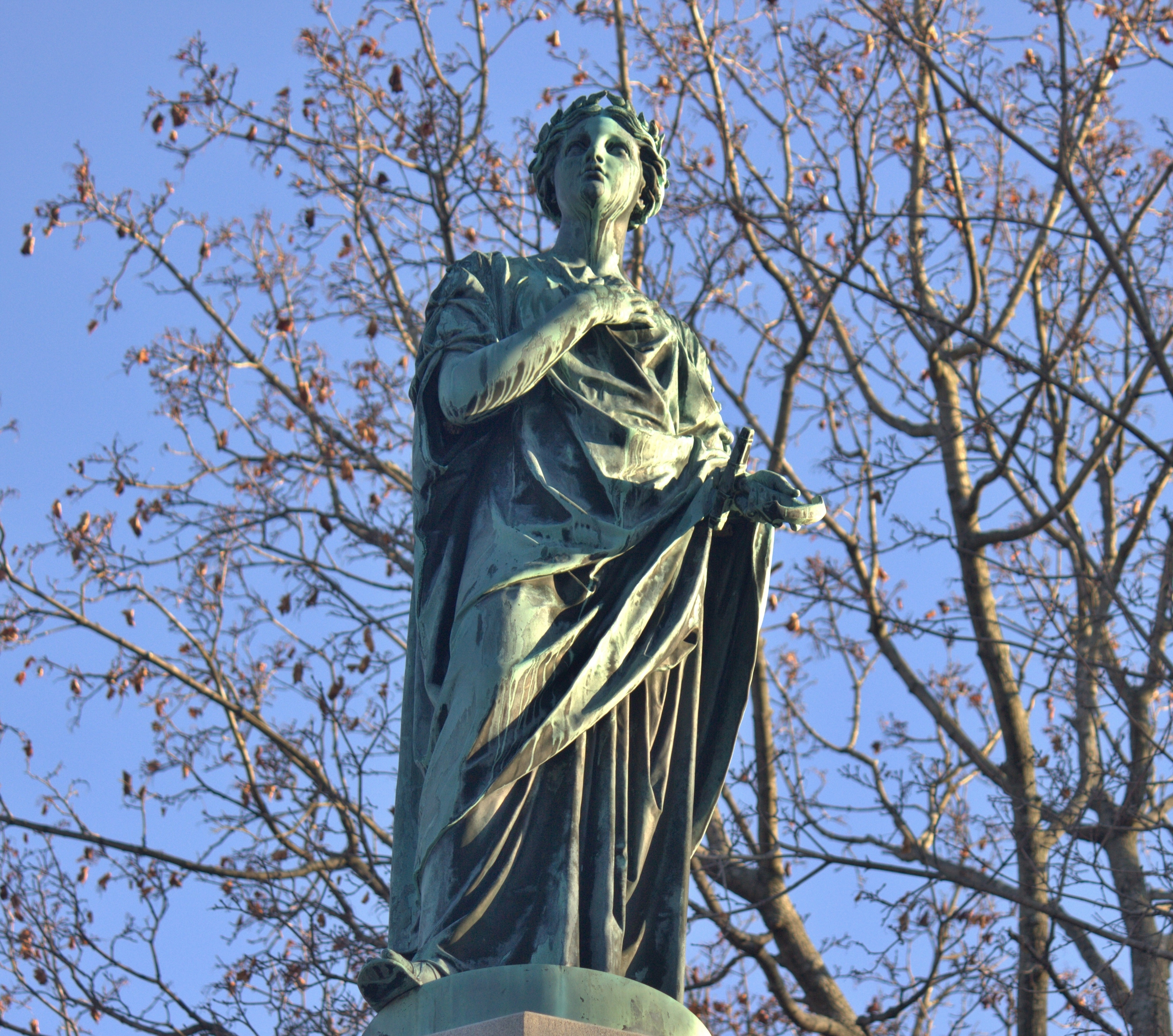
Statue atop Marshall Jewell monument, sculpted by Carl Conrads

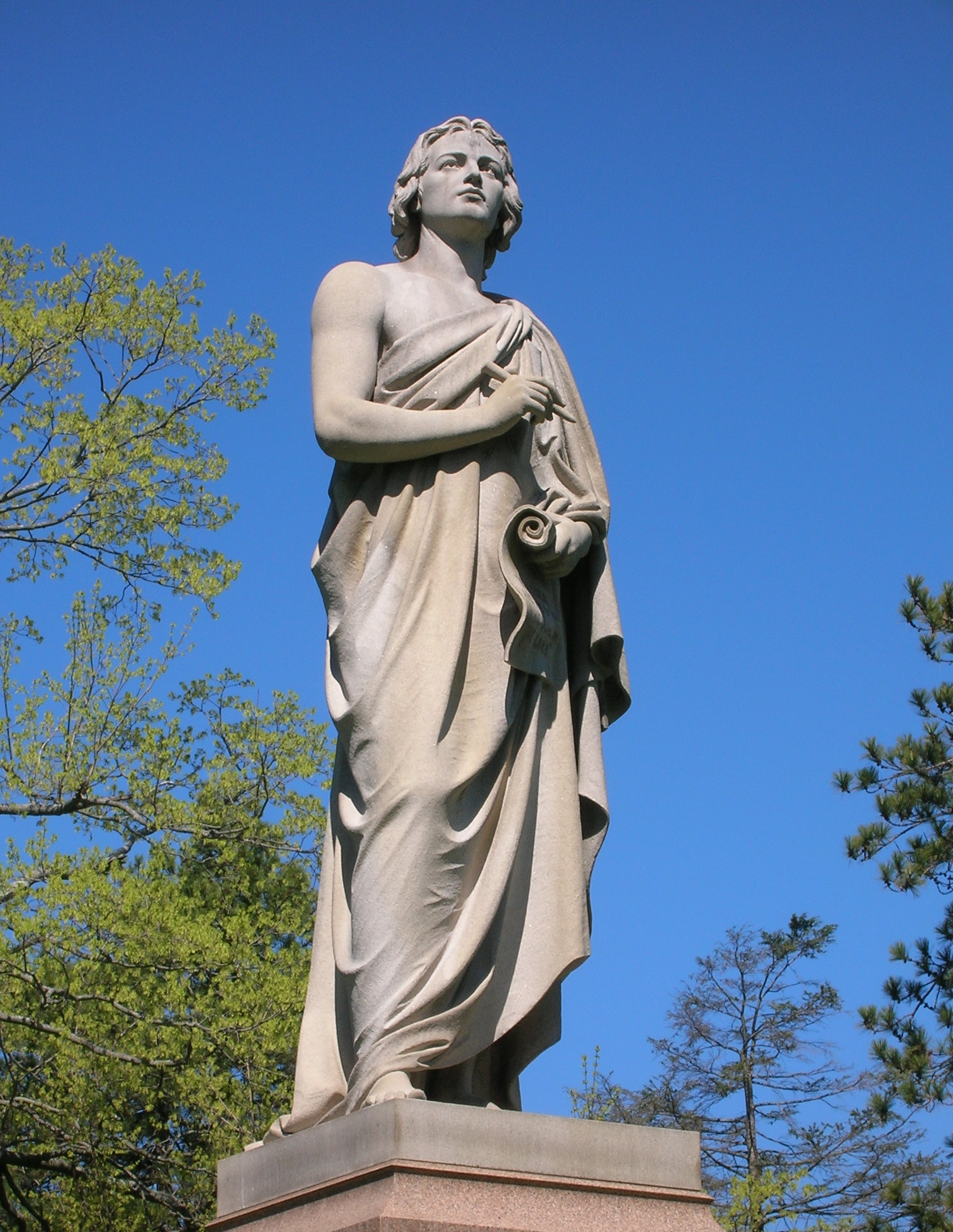
Statue atop John B. Windsor monument, sculpted by Carl Conrads (circa 1887–1905)

== See also ==
- National Register of Historic Places listings in Hartford, Connecticut
- National Register of Historic Places listings in Hartford County, Connecticut
