= Joseph R. Hawley =

American politician (1826–1905)

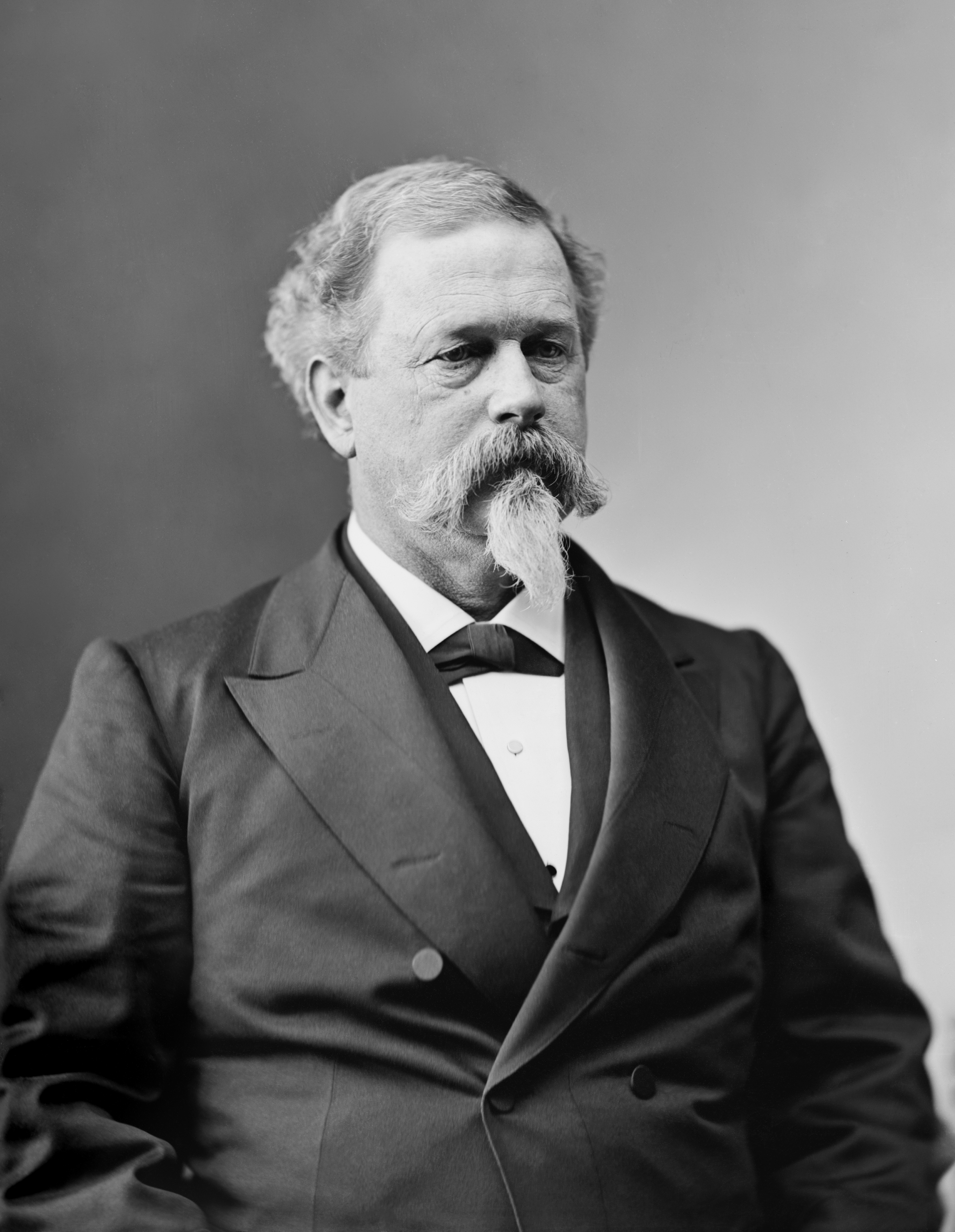
- Hawley, 1865–1880

United States Senator from Connecticut
- In office March 4, 1881 – March 3, 1905
- Preceded by: William W. Eaton
- Succeeded by: Morgan G. Bulkeley

42nd Governor of Connecticut
- In office May 2, 1866 – May 1, 1867
- Lieutenant: Oliver Winchester
- Preceded by: William A. Buckingham
- Succeeded by: James E. English

Member of the U.S. House of Representatives from Connecticut's 1st district
- In office December 2, 1872 – March 3, 1875
- Preceded by: Julius L. Strong
- Succeeded by: George M. Landers
- In office March 4, 1879 – March 3, 1881
- Preceded by: George M. Landers
- Succeeded by: John R. Buck

Personal details
- Born: Joseph Roswell Hawley; October 31, 1826 Stewartsville, North Carolina
- Died: March 18, 1905 (aged 78) Washington, D.C.
- Party: Republican
- Education: Hamilton College

Military service
- Branch/service: United States Army (Union Army)
- Rank: Brigadier general Brevet major general
- Battles/wars: See list: American Civil War; First Battle of Bull Run; Battle of Port Royal; Battle of Fort Pulaski; Siege of Charleston Harbor; Battle of Olustee; Bermuda Hundred Campaign; Siege of Petersburg; Battle of Wilmington

Joseph Roswell Hawley (October 31, 1826 – March 18, 1905) was the 42nd governor of Connecticut, a U.S. politician in the Republican and Free Soil parties, a Civil War general, and a journalist and newspaper editor. He served two terms in the United States House of Representatives and was a four-term U.S. senator.

== Early life and career ==
Hawley, a direct descendant of Joseph Hawley, first of the name in America, through Ebenezer, Joseph and Samuel, was born in Stewartsville, near Laurinburg, North Carolina, where Hawley's father, a native of Connecticut, was pastor of a Baptist church. He was born at the Stewart-Hawley-Malloy House; it was added to the National Register of Historic Places in 1975. His father returned to Connecticut in 1837 and Joseph attended and graduated from Hamilton College in New York in 1847. He was admitted to the bar in 1850 and practiced law in Hartford, Connecticut, for six years.

An ardent opponent of slavery, Hawley became a Free Soiler, was a delegate to the National Convention which nominated John Parker Hale for the presidency in 1852, and subsequently served as chairman of the party's State Committee and editor of the party's newspaper, the Charter Oak. In 1856, he took a leading part in organizing the Republican Party in Connecticut, and in 1857 became editor of the Hartford Evening Press, a newly established Republican newspaper.

== Civil War ==
Hawley served in the Federal army with distinction throughout the Civil War, rising from the rank of captain to that of brevet major general of volunteers. In April 1861, Hawley helped recruit and organize an infantry company. He was mustered into the three-month 1st Connecticut Infantry with the rank of captain of Company A on April 22. He first saw combat at the First Battle of Bull Run in July, receiving praise from his brigade commander, General Erasmus D. Keyes.

After mustering out, he then assisted Col. Alfred H. Terry in raising the 7th Connecticut Infantry, a three-year regiment, and was named as lieutenant colonel. He participated in the Port Royal Expedition in November, and commanded the forces assigned to garrison two captured forts. He was a part of the four-month siege that culminated in the capture of Fort Pulaski in April 1862. Again, he commanded the garrison force. With Colonel Terry's promotion to brigade command, Hawley succeeded him as commander of the 7th Connecticut, leading the regiment in the battles of James Island and Pocotaligo.

He was in Brannan's expedition to Florida in January 1863, and commanded the post at Ferandina, near Jacksonville. In April, he participated in an unsuccessful expedition to capture Charleston, South Carolina. In the summer, he commanded a brigade on Morris Island during the siege of Charleston, and was involved in the attacks on Fort Wagner in September. During the autumn, he procured enough Spencer breech-loading rifles to outfit his regiment with the rapid-fire weapon.

The following year, Hawley commanded a brigade under General Truman Seymour in the Battle of Olustee in Florida. He and his men were reassigned to the front lines in Virginia as a part of Terry's Division, X Corps, Army of the James. He was in the battles of Drewry's Bluff, Deep Run, Derbytown Road, and other actions near Bermuda Hundred and Deep Bottom. With openings created by battlefield losses and reassignments, Hawley commanded a division during the Siege of Petersburg and was promoted in September 1864 to brigadier general of volunteers. Concerned over keeping the peace during the November elections, Hawley commanded a hand-picked brigade shipped to New York City to safeguard the election process.

In January 1865, Hawley succeeded his mentor Alfred Terry as divisional commander when Terry was sent to command troops in the attacks on Fort Fisher. Hawley later joined him in North Carolina as chief of staff for the X Corps. After the capture of Wilmington, North Carolina, Hawley took over command of the forces in southeastern North Carolina. In June, following the surrender of the Confederate armies, Hawley rejoined Terry and served as chief of staff for the Department of Virginia, serving until October when he returned home to Connecticut. He was breveted as a major general in September 1865, and mustered out of the army on January 15, 1866.

== Postbellum ==
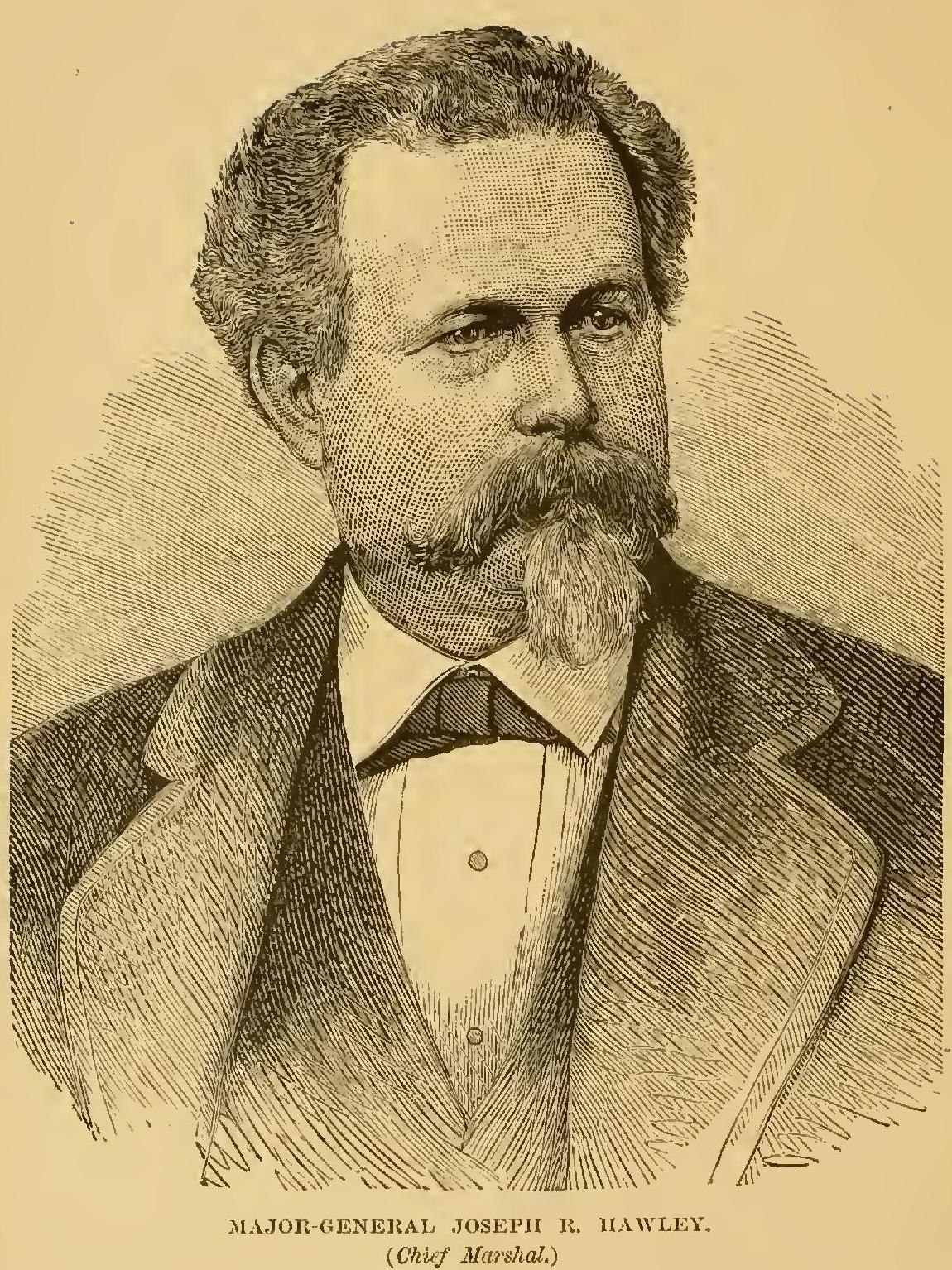
Hawley in 1880 art

After the war, Hawley served as governor of Connecticut from April 1866 to April 1867, but was defeated in the 1867 election. A few months after stepping down from that office, he bought the Hartford Courant newspaper, which he combined with the Press. Under his editorship, this became the most influential newspaper in Connecticut and one of the leading Republican papers in the country.

Hawley was the permanent chairman of the Republican National Convention in 1868, was a delegate to the conventions of 1872, 1876 and 1880. He represented Connecticut in the U.S. Congress from December 1872 until March 1875 and again in 1879–81, having lost the two elections in between. From 1873 to 1876, he served as president of the United States Centennial Commission, which planned and ran the Centennial Exhibition in Philadelphia. He was also a trustee of Hamilton College and received his LL. D. degree in 1875 (and another one from Yale in 1888).

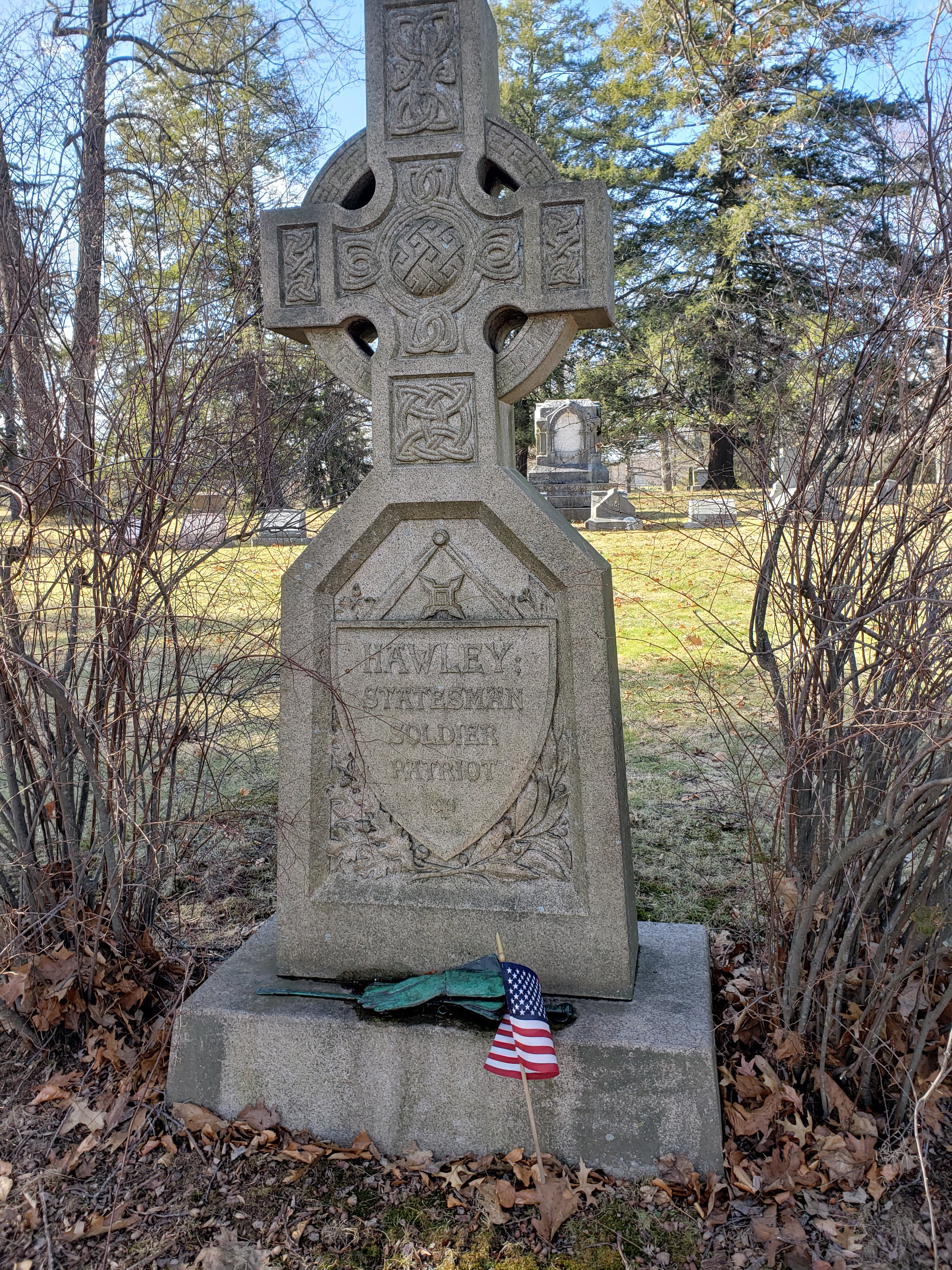
Hawley's gravestone in Cedar Hill Cemetery

Hawley was a United States senator from 1881 to 1905, being one of the key Republican leaders both in the House and the Senate. He was chairman of the committee on civil service, and vigorously promoted civil service reform legislation. He also chaired a special committee called to investigate the production of military ordnance and warships. In this capacity, he wrote a detailed report on the heavy steel industry and gun making in the United States and England.

He died in Washington, D.C., two weeks after stepping down from the Senate after his fourth term. At the time, he was the longest serving senator from Connecticut. A bronze bas relief representation of Hawley was commissioned from Herbert Adams, which was installed in the north portico of the Connecticut Capitol building and dedicated 18 October 1912. He was buried in Cedar Hill Cemetery in Hartford, Connecticut.

Hawley has a battery named in his honor at Fort Baldwin, in Phippsburg, Maine.

== Personal life ==
Hawley and his wife Harriet Foote Hawley adopted one of her nieces after the girl's parents died; as Margaret Foote Hawley she would go on to achieve some note as a painter of portrait miniatures. Harriet's sister Kate Foote Coe lived with the Hawleys while she was working as a newspaper correspondent in Washington.

== See also ==
- List of American Civil War generals (Union)

== Notes ==
Party political offices
Preceded by William Alfred Buckingham	Republican nominee for Governor of Connecticut; 1866, 1867	Succeeded by Marshall Jewell
U.S. House of Representatives
Preceded by Julius L. Strong	Member of the U.S. House of Representatives from Connecticut's 1st congressional district December 2, 1872 – March 3, 1875	Succeeded by George M. Landers
Preceded by George M. Landers	Member of the U.S. House of Representatives from Connecticut's 1st congressional district March 4, 1879 – March 3, 1881	Succeeded by John R. Buck
Political offices
Preceded by William A. Buckingham	Governor of Connecticut; 1866–1867	Succeeded by James E. English
U.S. Senate
Preceded by William W. Eaton	U.S. senator (Class 1) from Connecticut; 1881–1905; Served alongside: Orville H. Platt	Succeeded by Morgan G. Bulkeley
