= George M. Landers =

American politician (1813–1895)

George Marcellus Landers
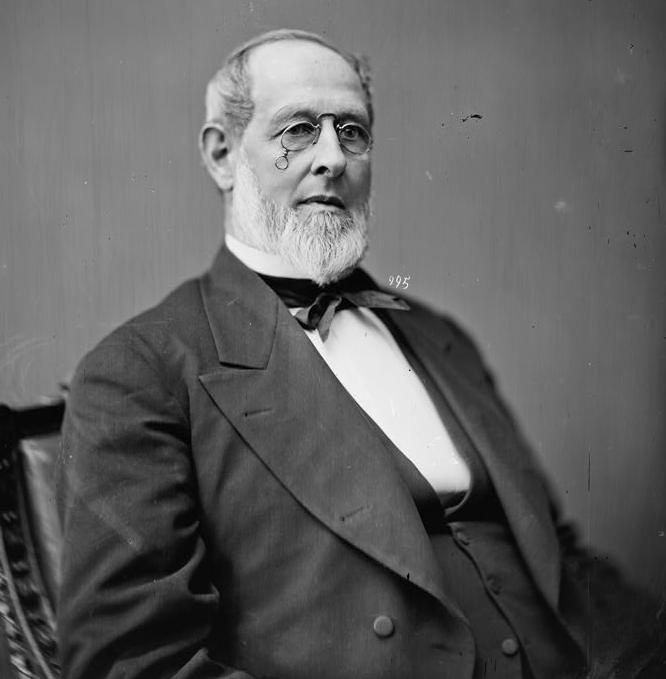

Member of the United States House of Representatives from Connecticut's 1st district
- In office March 4, 1875 – March 3, 1879
- Preceded by: Joseph Roswell Hawley
- Succeeded by: Joseph Roswell Hawley

President pro tempore of the Connecticut Senate

Member of the Connecticut Senate
- In office 1853; 1869; 1873

Member of the Connecticut House of Representatives
- In office 1851; 1867; 1874

Personal details
- Born: February 22, 1813
- Died: March 27, 1895 (aged 82)

George Marcellus Landers (February 22, 1813 – March 27, 1895) was a U.S. representative from Connecticut.

== Biography ==
Born in Lenox, Massachusetts, Landers attended public school. He moved to New Britain, Connecticut, in 1830 and engaged in the manufacture of hardware. He served as member of the Connecticut House of Representatives in 1851, 1867, and 1874. He served in the Connecticut Senate in 1853, 1869, and 1873. He served as President pro tempore of the Connecticut Senate. He was State bank commissioner in 1874.

Landers was elected as a Democrat to the Forty-fourth and Forty-fifth Congresses (March 4, 1875 – March 3, 1879). He died in New Britain, Connecticut, March 27, 1895. He was interred in Fairview Cemetery.

U.S. House of Representatives
Preceded by Joseph R. Hawley	Member of the U.S. House of Representatives from Connecticut's 1st congressional district March 4, 1875 – March 3, 1879	Succeeded by Joseph R. Hawley
