= William W. Eaton =

American politician (1816–1898)

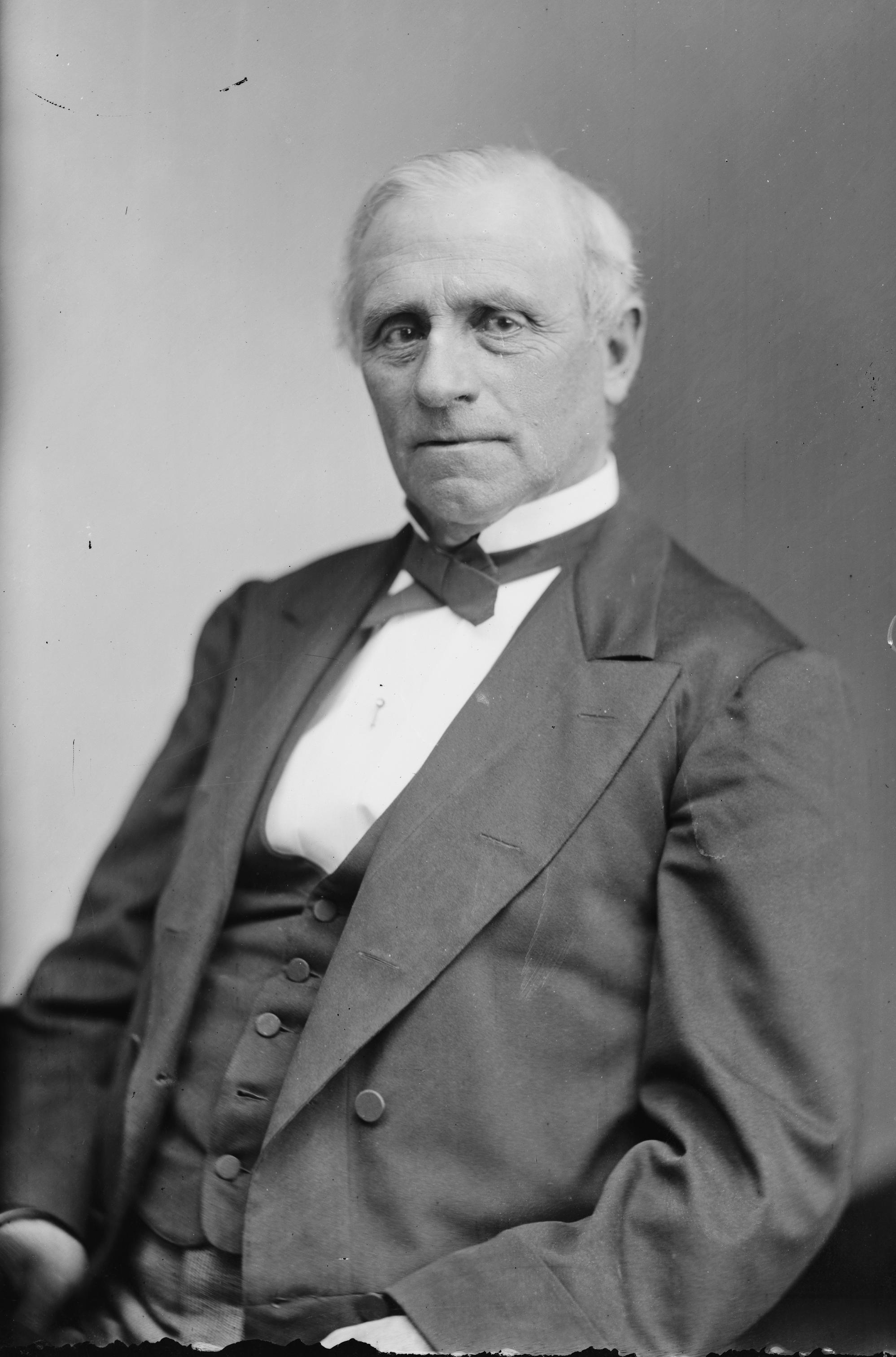
- Eaton c. 1865–80

United States Senator from Connecticut
- In office February 5, 1875 – March 3, 1881
- Preceded by: William A. Buckingham
- Succeeded by: Joseph R. Hawley

Member of the U.S. House of Representatives from Connecticut's 1st district
- In office March 4, 1883 – March 3, 1885
- Preceded by: John R. Buck
- Succeeded by: John R. Buck

Member of the Connecticut House of Representatives
- In office 1847-1848; 1853

Member of the Connecticut Senate
- In office 1850

Personal details
- Born: October 11, 1816 Tolland, Connecticut, US
- Died: September 21, 1898 (aged 81) Hartford, Connecticut, US
- Party: Democratic

William Wallace Eaton (October 11, 1816 – September 21, 1898) was a United States representative and United States senator from Connecticut.

== Biography ==
Born in Tolland, Connecticut, he was educated in the common schools and by private instruction. He moved to Columbia, South Carolina to engage in mercantile pursuits, then returned to Tolland, studied law, and was admitted to the bar in 1837, and began practice there.

== Career ==
A clerk of courts of Tolland County in 1846 and 1847, Eaton was a member of the Connecticut House of Representatives 1847–1848, then a member of the Connecticut state senate 20th District in 1850. In 1851, he moved to Hartford, and was clerk of courts of Hartford County in 1851 and 1854, as well as city attorney in 1857 and 1858. He was chief judge of the city court of Hartford in 1863 and 1864, and from 1867 to 1872, and was a delegate to Democratic National Convention from Connecticut in 1864 and 1868.

Eaton was again a member of the Connecticut House of Representatives in 1853, and again was a member of the Connecticut Senate in 1859. An unsuccessful Democratic candidate for the U.S. Senate in 1860, Eaton again served as a Representative in 1863, 1868, 1870–1871 and 1873–1874. He served as speaker in 1853 and 1873.

Appointed as a Democrat to the United States Senate to fill the vacancy caused by the death of William A. Buckingham, Eaton served from February 5, 1875, to March 3, 1875. Elected for the full term beginning March 4, 1875, he served until March 3, 1881. While in the Senate, he was chairman of the Committee on Foreign Relations (Forty-sixth Congress). He would prove the last Democratic Senator from Connecticut until Augustine Lonergan was elected in 1932.

Eaton was also elected as a Democratic Representative to the Forty-eighth Congress (March 4, 1883 – March 3, 1885), and was an unsuccessful candidate for reelection in 1884.

== Death ==
Eaton resumed the practice of law until he died in Hartford, on September 21, 1898 (age 81 years, 345 days). He is interred at Spring Grove Cemetery, Hartford, Connecticut.

U.S. Senate
Preceded by William A. Buckingham	U.S. senator (Class 1) from Connecticut; 1875–1881; Served alongside: Orris S. Ferry, James E. English, William H. Barnum, Orville H. Platt	Succeeded by Joseph R. Hawley
U.S. House of Representatives
Preceded by John R. Buck	Member of the U.S. House of Representatives from Connecticut's 1st congressional district March 4, 1883 – March 3, 1885	Succeeded by John R. Buck
