= John R. Buck =

American politician (1835–1917)

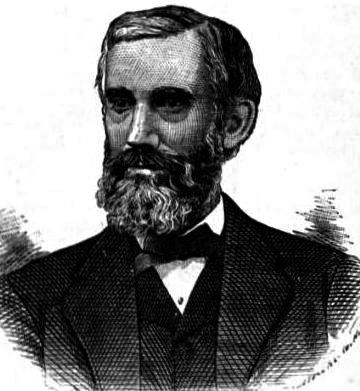

Member of the U.S. House of Representatives from Connecticut's 1st district
- In office March 4, 1885 – March 3, 1887
- Preceded by: William W. Eaton
- Succeeded by: Robert J. Vance
- In office March 4, 1881 – March 3, 1883
- Preceded by: Joseph R. Hawley
- Succeeded by: William W. Eaton

Personal details
- Born: December 6, 1835 Glastonbury, Connecticut, US
- Died: February 6, 1917 (aged 81) Hartford, Connecticut, US
- Resting place: Cedar Hill Cemetery
- Party: Republican

John Ransom Buck (December 6, 1835 – February 6, 1917) was a U.S. representative from Connecticut.

== Pre-congressional years ==
Buck was born in Glastonbury, Connecticut, to Halsey and Sarah Anne Buck. He attended Wilbraham Academy and Wesleyan University, located at Middletown, Connecticut, where he studied law.

In 1859, he entered the law office of Wells & Strong as a law student. He was admitted to the bar in 1862 and practiced in Hartford. Buck was assistant clerk of the state House of Representatives in 1864 and clerk in 1865. He was clerk of the Senate in 1866, president of the Hartford Court of Common Council in 1868, city attorney 1871 — 1873, treasurer of Hartford County 1873 — 1881 and a member of the Connecticut State Senate in 1880 — 1881.

On April 12, 1865, he married Mary A. Keeney of Manchester, Connecticut. They had two children.

== Elections ==
Buck was elected as a Republican to the Forty-seventh Congress (March 4, 1881—March 3, 1883) and to the Forty-ninth Congress (March 4, 1885—March 3, 1887). He was an unsuccessful candidate for re-election in 1882 to the Forty-eighth Congress and for the re-election in 1886 to the Fiftieth Congress.

== After Congress ==
He resumed the practice of law in Hartford, Connecticut. After a long battle with illness, Buck died on February 6, 1917. He was interred at Cedar Hill Cemetery.

U.S. House of Representatives
Preceded by Joseph R. Hawley	Member of the U.S. House of Representatives from Connecticut's 1st congressional district 1881–1883	Succeeded by William W. Eaton
Preceded by William W. Eaton	Member of the U.S. House of Representatives from Connecticut's 1st congressional district 1885–1887	Succeeded by Robert J. Vance
