= Edward Sims Van Zile =

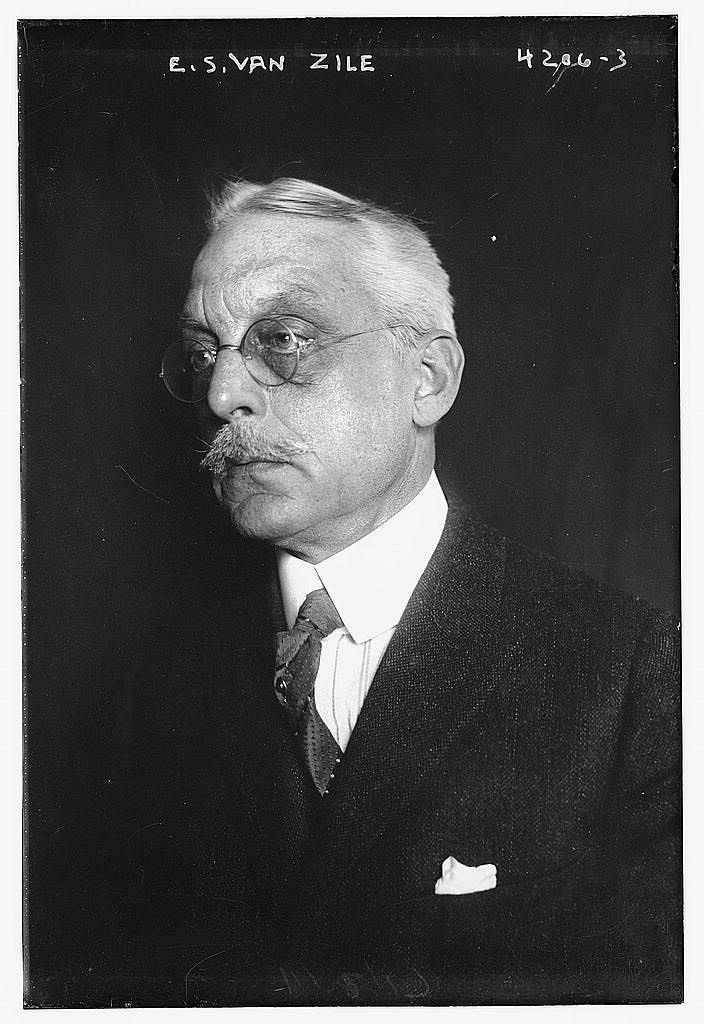
- (c.1917)
- Born: May 2, 1863; Troy, New York, US
- Died: May 29, 1931 (aged 68); Manhattan, New York City, US
- Education: Trinity College, Hartford, Connecticut
- Title: Doctor of Letters (honorary)

Edward Sims Van Zile (May 2, 1863 – May 29, 1931) was an American writer. He published fiction, non-fiction, biographies, a commentary on war, and a history of the early days of movies. In 1904, in an essay about him, Book News Biographies said "for the past ten years Mr. Van Zile has been known to the reading public through many short stories, novelettes and a few novels".

== Life and career ==
Van Zile was born on May 2, 1863, in Troy, New York to Oscar Edward Van Zile and the former Sarah Melinda Perry. He was a descendant of Hollanders who came to America in the 17th century. He graduated from Trinity College in Hartford, Connecticut in 1884. In 1904 the college gave him the honorary degree of Doctor of Letters. In addition to several books and articles, he wrote a libretto for a musical comedy.

In 1885 Van Zile began working for Joseph Pulitzer's New York World as the editor of a column called "Personal and Pertinent", which was one of the earliest daily columns concerned with the activities of the social elite of the New York City area.

On December 8, 1886, he married Mary Morgan Bulkeley. They had five children, four daughters, Mary "Molly" Van Zile (1887–1963), Sally Van Zile (1890–??), Harriet L. Van Zile (1892–??), Winifred Van Zile (1902–1902) and a son, Edward Bulkeley Van Zile (1888–1964).

Van Zile died on May 29, 1931, of a stroke at his home at 439 East 51st Street in Manhattan, New York City. He was buried in Cedar Hill Cemetery in Hartford, Connecticut.

== Stories ==
- The last of the Van Slacks; a story of to-day (1889)
- A magnetic man and other stories (1890)
- Don Miguel, and other stories (1891)
- The Manhattaners; a story of the hour (1900)
- A duke and his double (1903)
- Defending the bank (1903)
