= Jacob Weidenmann =

Swiss landscape architect (1829–1893)

Jacob Weidenmann (August 22, 1829 – February 6, 1893) was a landscape architect from Switzerland known for his design of rural cemeteries and public parks.

== Biography ==
Weidenmann was born in Winterthur, Switzerland on August 22, 1829. He was educated at the Akademie der bildenden Künste, Vienna, where he studied art, architecture, engineering, and botany.

After graduating, he worked in Munich, Paris, London, New York City, Panama, and Peru, before settling in the United States in 1856. In 1861 he was named first superintendent of parks in Hartford, Connecticut, where he designed Bushnell Park and Cedar Hill Cemetery. Beginning in 1874 he shared an office with Frederick Law Olmsted, and they subsequently collaborated on projects including Mount Royal Park in Montreal and the Washington, D.C. Capitol grounds.

Weidenmann's Hartford designs include grounds for the American School for the Deaf, Bushnell Park, the Butler-McCook Homestead gardens, Cedar Hill Cemetery, and the Institute of Living. His Midwest designs include the Iowa State Capitol grounds and Chicago's Mount Hope Cemetery. His national work includes landscape designs for the United States Capitol, U.S. Quartermaster Depot, Schuylkill Arsenal, and Hot Springs Reservation.

He died on February 6, 1893, and was interred at Cedar Hill Cemetery in Hartford, Connecticut.

== Legacy ==
Harvard University established the Jacob Weidenmann prize which is awarded annually to landscape architecture students who show outstanding ability and talent in landscape design.

== Bibliography ==
- Beautifying country homes, Orange Judd, New York, 1870. Reprinted as Victorian Landscape Gardening: A Facsimile of Jacob Weidenmann's Beautifying country homes, American Life Foundation for the Athenaeum Library of Nineteenth Century America, 1978. ISBN 0-89257-021-0.
- Modern cemeteries. An essay upon the improvements and proper management of rural cemeteries, The Monumental news, Chicago, c1888.
