= Robert J. Vance =

American politician (1854–1902)

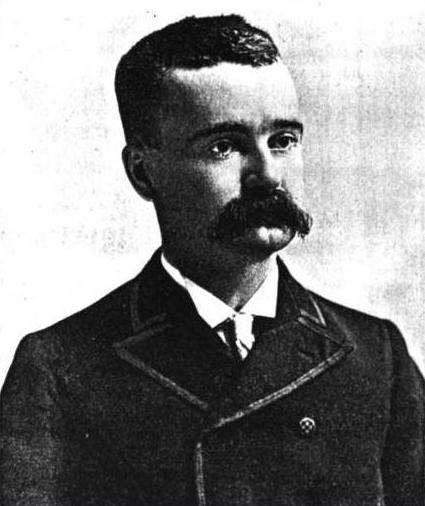

Member of the U.S. House of Representatives from Connecticut's 1st district
- In office March 4, 1887 – March 3, 1889
- Preceded by: John R. Buck
- Succeeded by: William E. Simonds

Personal details
- Born: March 15, 1854 New York City, New York
- Died: June 15, 1902 (aged 48) Montreat, North Carolina
- Party: Democratic

Robert Johnstone Vance (March 15, 1854 – June 15, 1902) was a U.S. representative from Connecticut.

Born in New York City, Vance attended the common schools. He moved to New Britain, Connecticut in 1870, where He attended high school. Vance was city clerk of New Britain from 1878 until his resignation in 1887, having been elected a Representative. He became editor and publisher of the New Britain Herald in 1881. He served as member of the Connecticut House of Representatives in 1886.

Vance was elected as a Democrat to the 50th United States Congress (March 4, 1887 – March 3, 1889). He was an unsuccessful candidate for reelection in 1888 to the 51st Congress, after which he resumed his former business pursuits. Vance was labor commissioner of Connecticut from 1893 to1895. He served as mayor of New Britain, Connecticut, in 1896 and 1897. He served as delegate to Connecticut's constitutional convention in 1902. He died in Montreat, North Carolina on June 15, 1902. He was interred in Fairview Cemetery, New Britain, Connecticut. He was the father of Robert C. Vance (1894-1959), Herald publisher from 1951 to 1959. Vance Village Elementary School in New Britain, Connecticut is named after him.

U.S. House of Representatives
| Preceded by John R. Buck | Member of the U.S. House of Representatives from Connecticut's 1st congressional district 1887-1889 | Succeeded by William E. Simonds |
