= 1866 Connecticut gubernatorial election =

- April 2, 1866
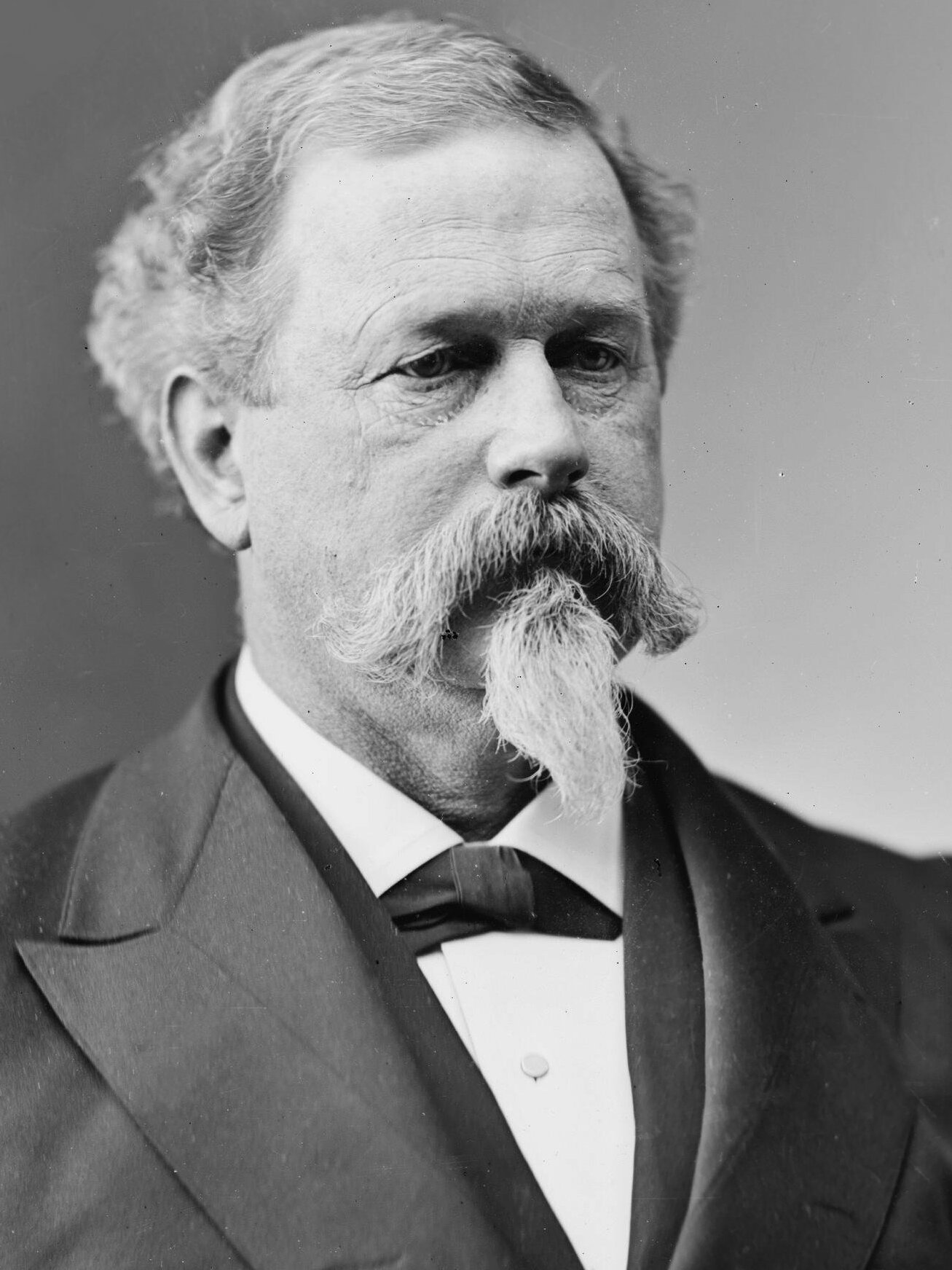

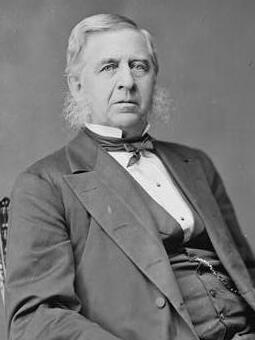
Nominee	Joseph Roswell Hawley	James E. English
Party	Republican	Democratic
Alliance	—	National Union
Popular vote	43,888	43,433
Percentage	50.26%	49.74%
- Hawley: 50–60% 60–70% 70–80% English: 50–60% 60–70% 70–80%
Governor before election
William Alfred Buckingham
National Union
Elected Governor
Joseph Roswell Hawley
Republican

The 1866 Connecticut gubernatorial election was held on April 2, 1866. Civil War general and Republican nominee Joseph Roswell Hawley defeated Democratic nominee James E. English with 50.30% of the vote.

The Republican–Union coalition split in 1866, as Union Party supporters of president Andrew Johnson abandoned their Republican coalition partners to support English and the Democratic state candidates. English's narrow defeat signaled the "perilous condition" of the Union coalition in New England.

== General election ==
=== Candidates ===
Major party candidates

- Joseph Roswell Hawley, Republican
- James E. English, Democratic–Union

=== Results ===
1866 Connecticut gubernatorial election
Party	Candidate	Votes	%	±%
Republican	Joseph Roswell Hawley	43,888	50.26%	
Democratic	James E. English	43,433	49.74%	
Other	Others	10	0.01%	
Majority		541		
Turnout				
Republican hold		Swing		

== Bibliography ==
- Dell, Christopher (1975). Lincoln and the War Democrats: The Grand Erosion of Conservative Tradition. Rutherford, NJ: Farleigh Dickenson University Press. ISBN 978-0-8386-1466-2.
- Dubin, Michael J. (2014). United States Gubernatorial Elections, 1861-1911: The Official Results by State and County. Jefferson, NC: McFarland and Company.
